= Linköping University =

Public university in Linköping, Sweden

Coordinates: 58°23′57″N 15°34′37″E

- Linköpings universitet
- Type: Public research university
- Established: 1969; 57 years ago University status since 1975
- Affiliations: EUA, ECIU, CDIO, SEFI, NORDTEK
- Budget: 4.9 bn SEK (2023)
- Chairperson: Deputy Director General Susanne Thedén, PhD
- Vice-Chancellor: Prof. Jan-Ingvar Jönsson, PhD
- Dean: Arts & Sciences: Prof. Ulf Melin, PhD Educational Sciences: Senior Assoc. Prof. Håkan Löfgren, PhD Medicine & Health Sciences: Prof. Lena Jonasson, PhD, MD Science & Engineering: Prof. Johan Ölvander, PhD
- University Director: Agneta Frode Blomberg (acting)
- Total staff: 4,462 (3,674 FTE, 2023)
- Students: 40,400 (19,445 FTE, 2023)
- Doctoral students: 1,261 (644 FTE, 2023)
- Location: Linköping, Norrköping, and Lidingö, Sweden
- Campus: Campus Valla Campus US Campus Norrköping Campus Lidingö
- Colors: Blue, Turquoise and Green
- Website: www.liu.se

Linköping University (LiU; Swedish: Linköpings universitet) is a public research university based in Linköping, Sweden. Originally established in 1969, it was granted full university status in 1975 and is one of Sweden's largest academic institutions.

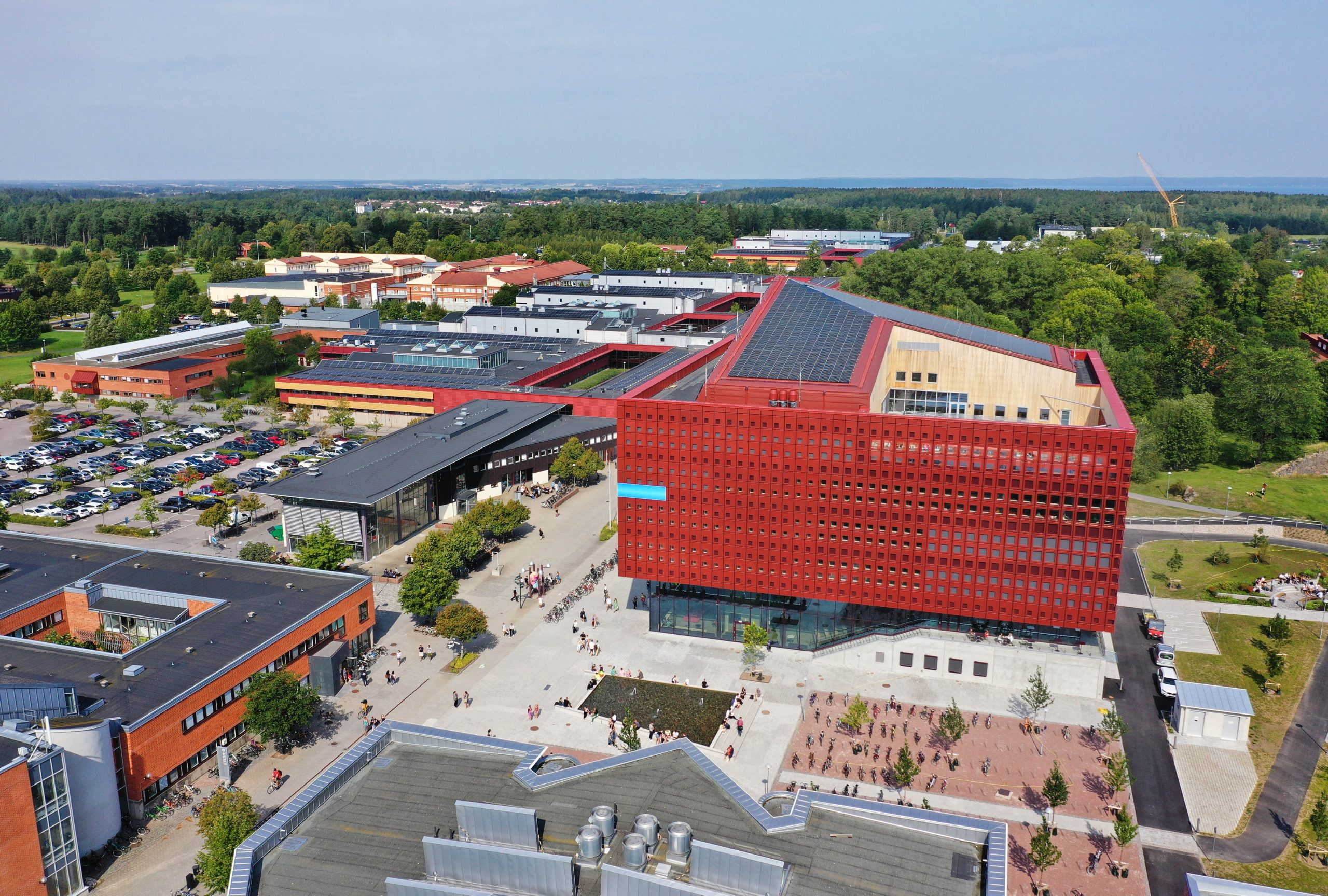
Campus Valla, the first and main campus of Linköping University.

The university has four campuses across three cities: Campus Valla and Campus US in Linköping, Campus Norrköping in Norrköping and Campus Lidingö in Lidingö. It is organized into four faculties: Arts and Sciences; Medicine and Health Sciences; Science and Engineering (also referred to as the Institute of Technology); and Educational Sciences (formally an “area”, but in practice functions as a faculty). To facilitate interdisciplinary work, there are 12 large departments combining knowledge from several disciplines and often belonging under more than one faculty. In 2004 the university had 44 500 students and 4 700 employees.

It is a founding member of the Conceive Design Implement Operate (CDIO) Initiative, as well as a member of the European Consortium of Innovative Universities (ECIU), the European University Association (EUA), the European Society for Engineering Education (SEFI) and NORDTEK.

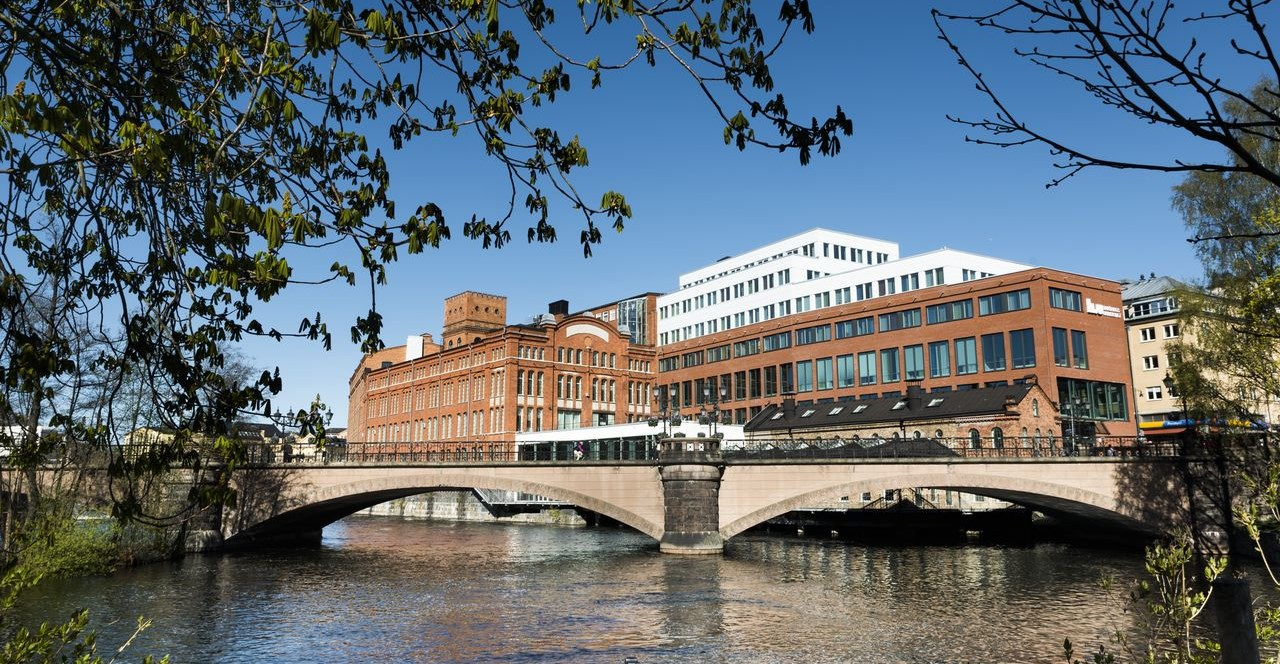
Kåkenhus building — in actuality a number of connected buildings and structures — on Campus Norrköping, the main building on campus.

== History ==
Former logo, used until 2015.

The origins of Linköping University date back to the 1960s. In 1965, The Swedish National Legislative Assembly (Riksdag) decided to locate some programmes within the fields of technology and medicine to Linköping. A branch of Stockholm University was placed in Linköping in 1967, offering education within humanities, social sciences and natural sciences.

Two years later in 1969, a unit for medical training and the Institute of Technology were established, marking the founding of the university. In 1970 all activities were brought together in three faculties within the Linköping University College: the Faculty of Arts and Sciences, the Faculty of Medicine and the Institute of Technology. Linköping University College was granted full university status in 1975 and renamed Linköping University.

In 1977 the teacher training colleges in Linköping and Norrköping were transferred to Linköping University. The Faculty of Health Sciences was formed in 1986 based on the faculty of medicine and regional funded education in health care professions. In 1997 a campus was opened in the neighbouring city of Norrköping. The renowned Carl Malmsten School of Furniture — officially Malmstens Linköping University (MLU), and most often referred to as Malmstens — has been part of Linköping University since 2000; after almost 60 years at the city centre, in 2009 Malmstens moved into new premises on the outskirts of Stockholm.

== Campuses ==
Education and research are conducted at three campuses in the cities of Linköping and Norrköping — Campus Valla, Campus US and Campus Norrköping — situated approximately 200 and 160 kilometers southwest of Stockholm, respectively. The Campus Bus (free of charge for students) connects the three campuses in Linköping and Norrköping. A fourth campus, Campus Lidingö, is located in Lidingö, a city in the inner Stockholm archipelago.

=== Campus Valla ===
Campus Valla, three kilometers from the city centre of Linköping, is the university's largest campus and where the majority of students and researchers study and work. Campus Valla is sandwiched between Linköping Science Park and Linköping Golf Course to the west, and Valla Wood — a 200 acres large nature reserve — to the east. Campus Valla also houses several government research institutes, such as the Swedish Defence Research Agency (FOI) and the Swedish National Road and Transport Research Institute (VTI).

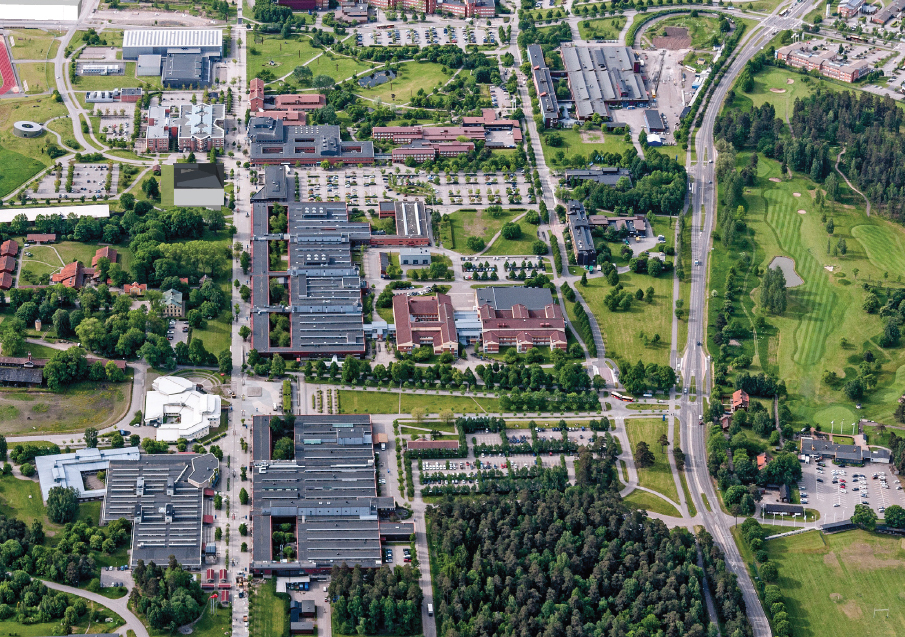
Aerial view of Campus Valla. The edges of Linköping Golf Course and Linköping Science Park is on the right.

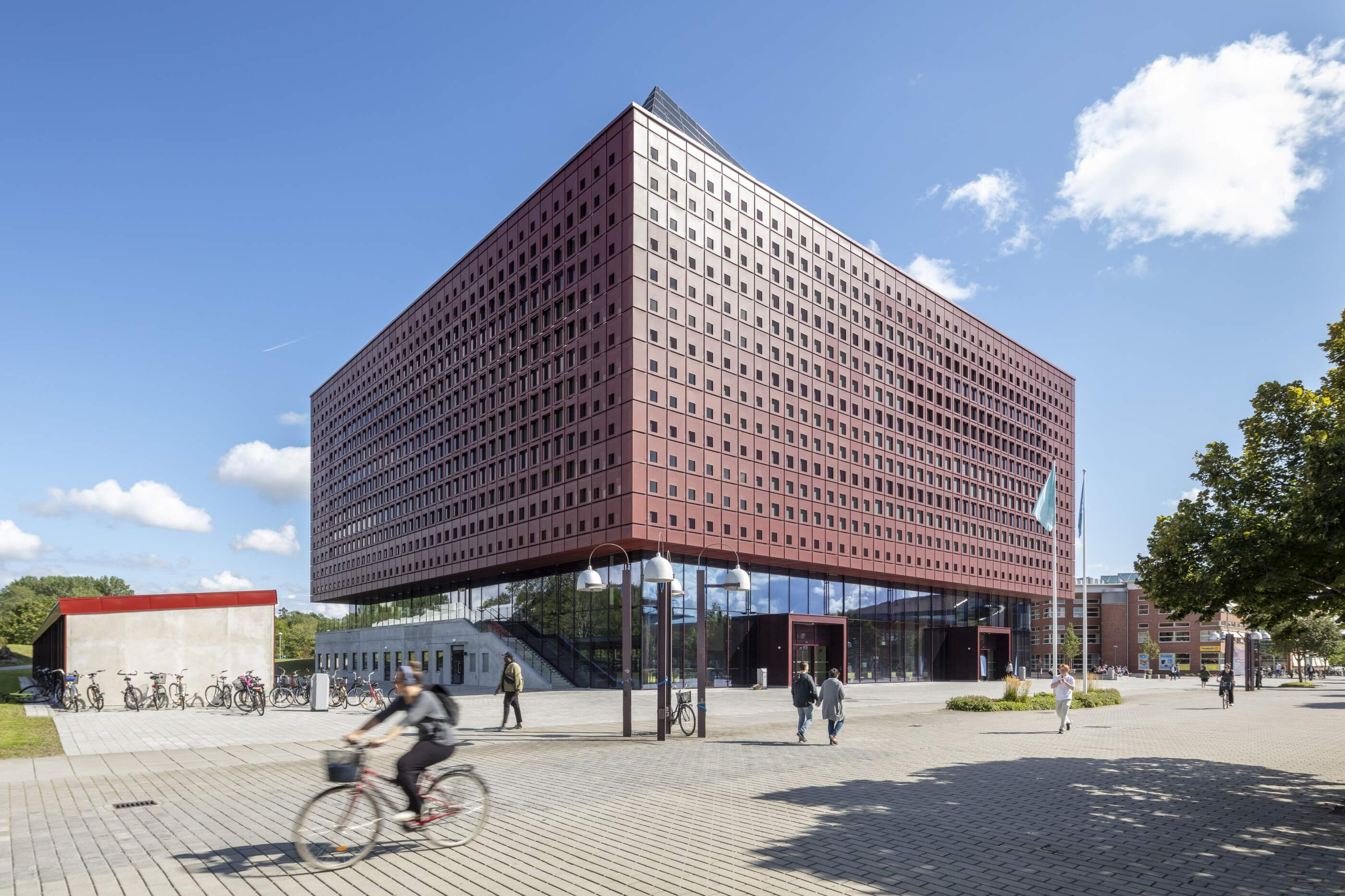
Studenthuset on Campus Valla opened in 2019. Houses the library, student services and many study areas.

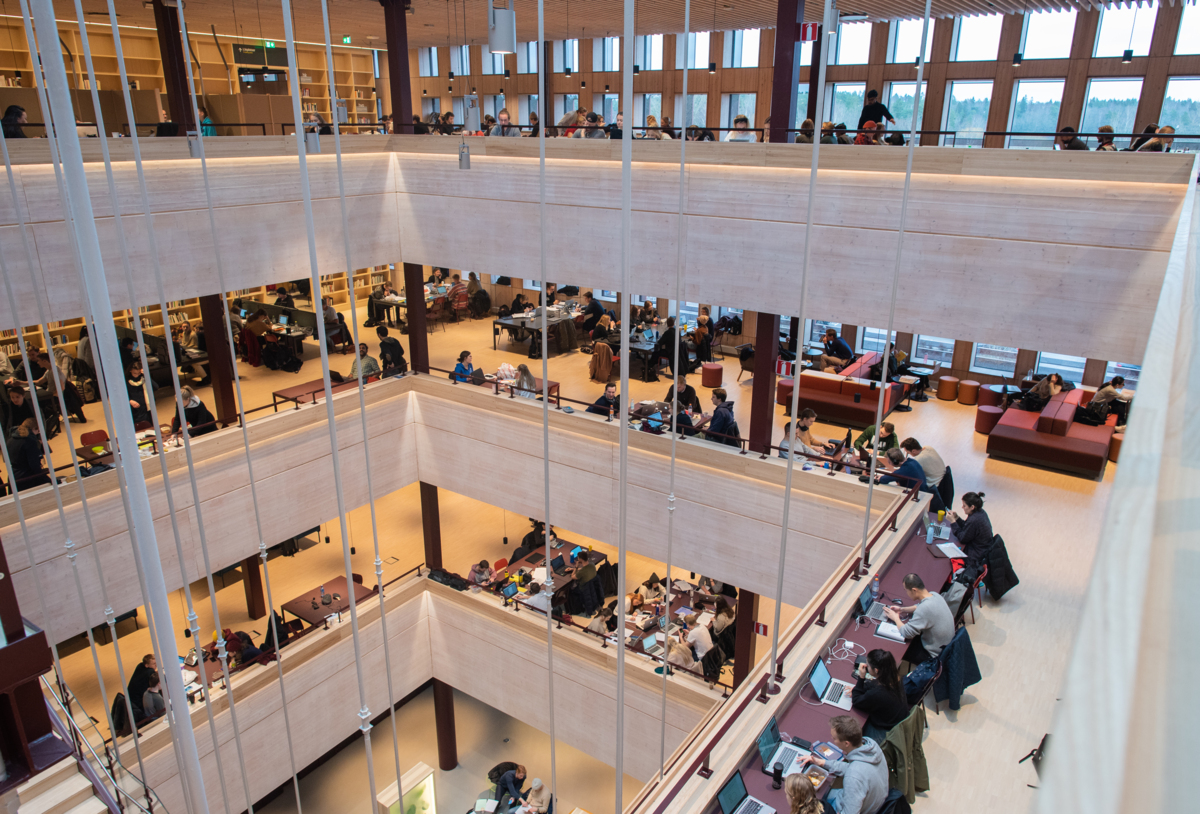
Study areas inside Studenthuset on Campus Valla.

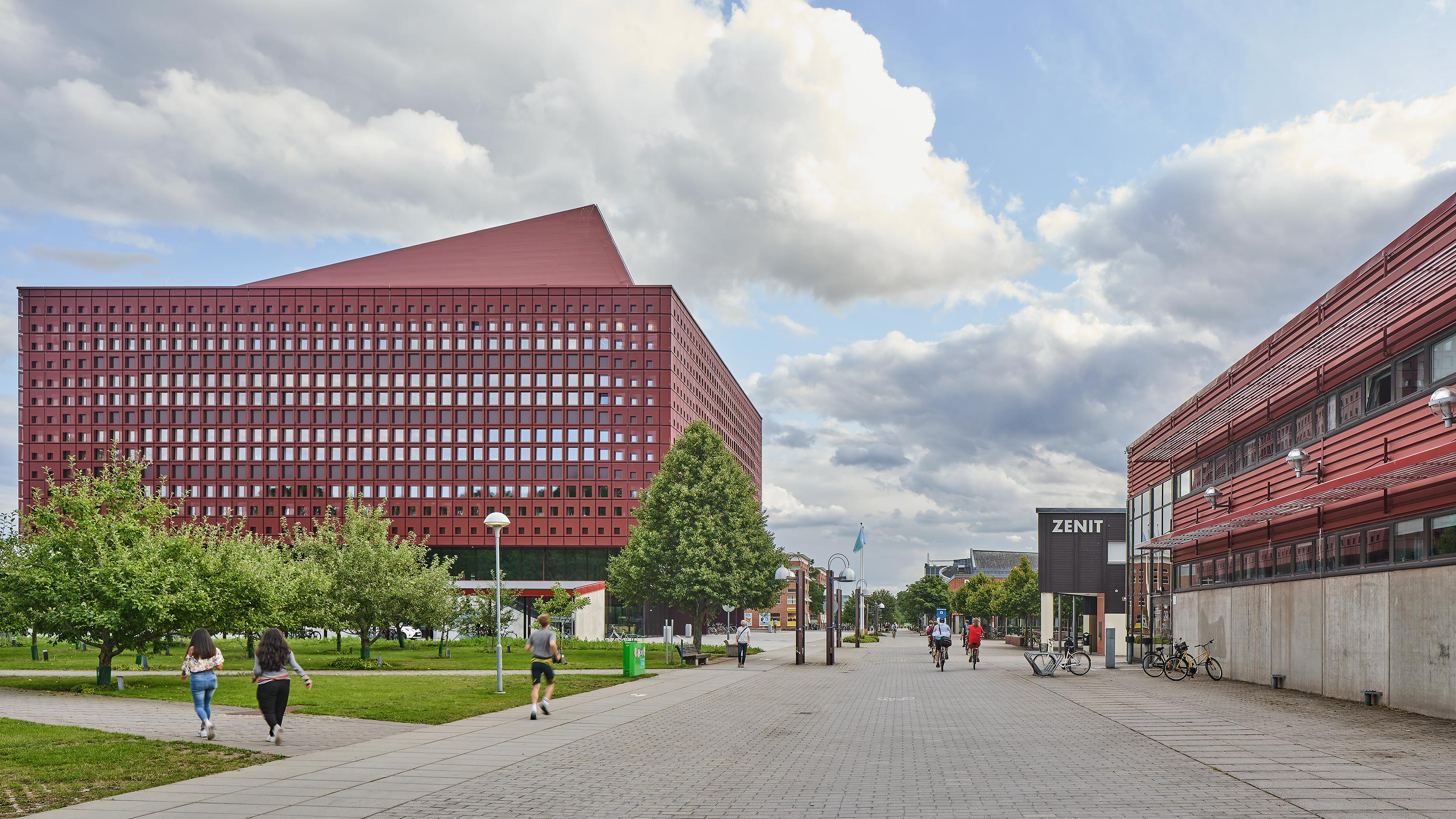
The southern part of Campus Valla. Left: Studenthuset and Key Building; right: B, D and Zenit Buildings.

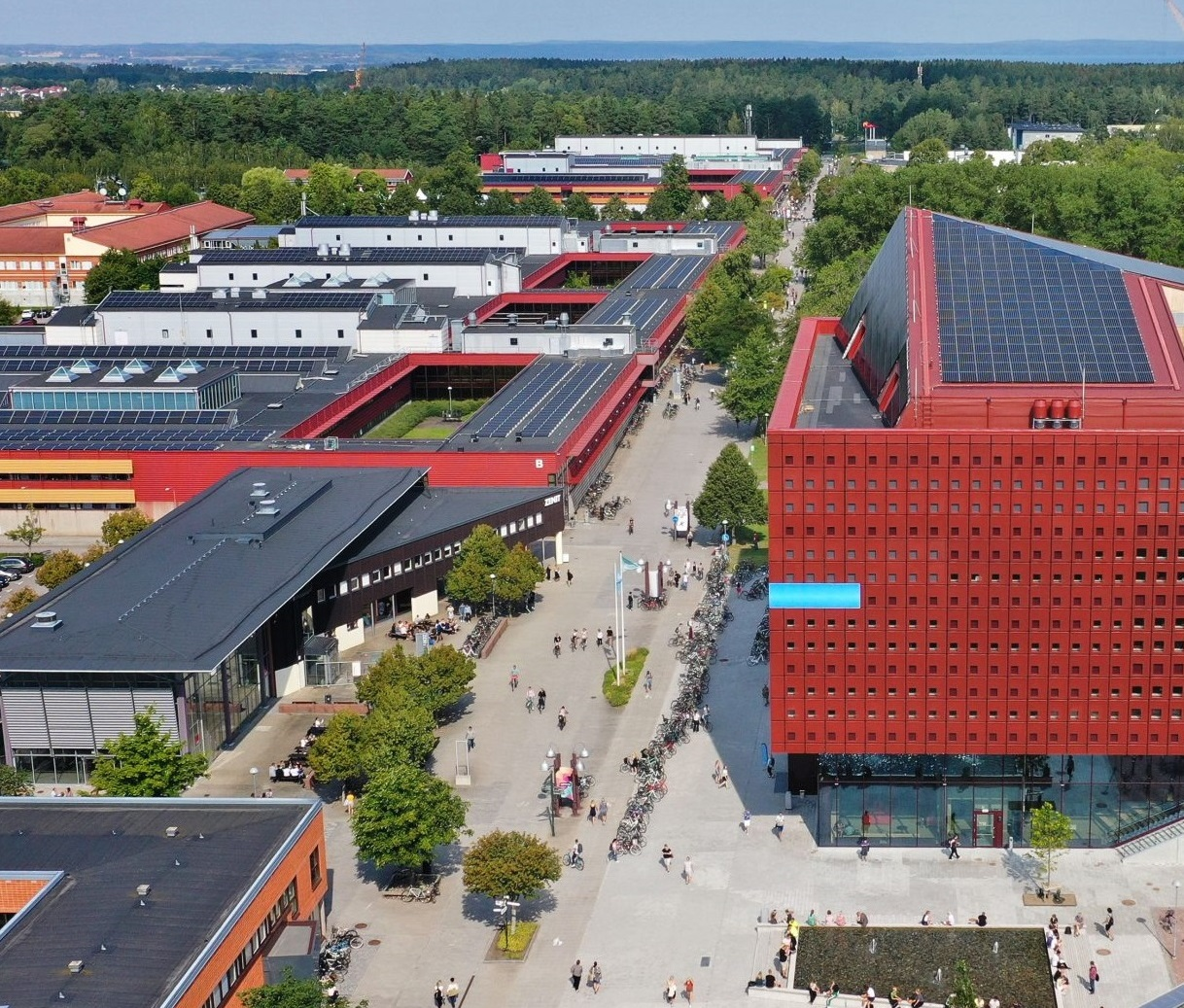
Aerial view of the Corso (the main walkway) on Campus Valla.

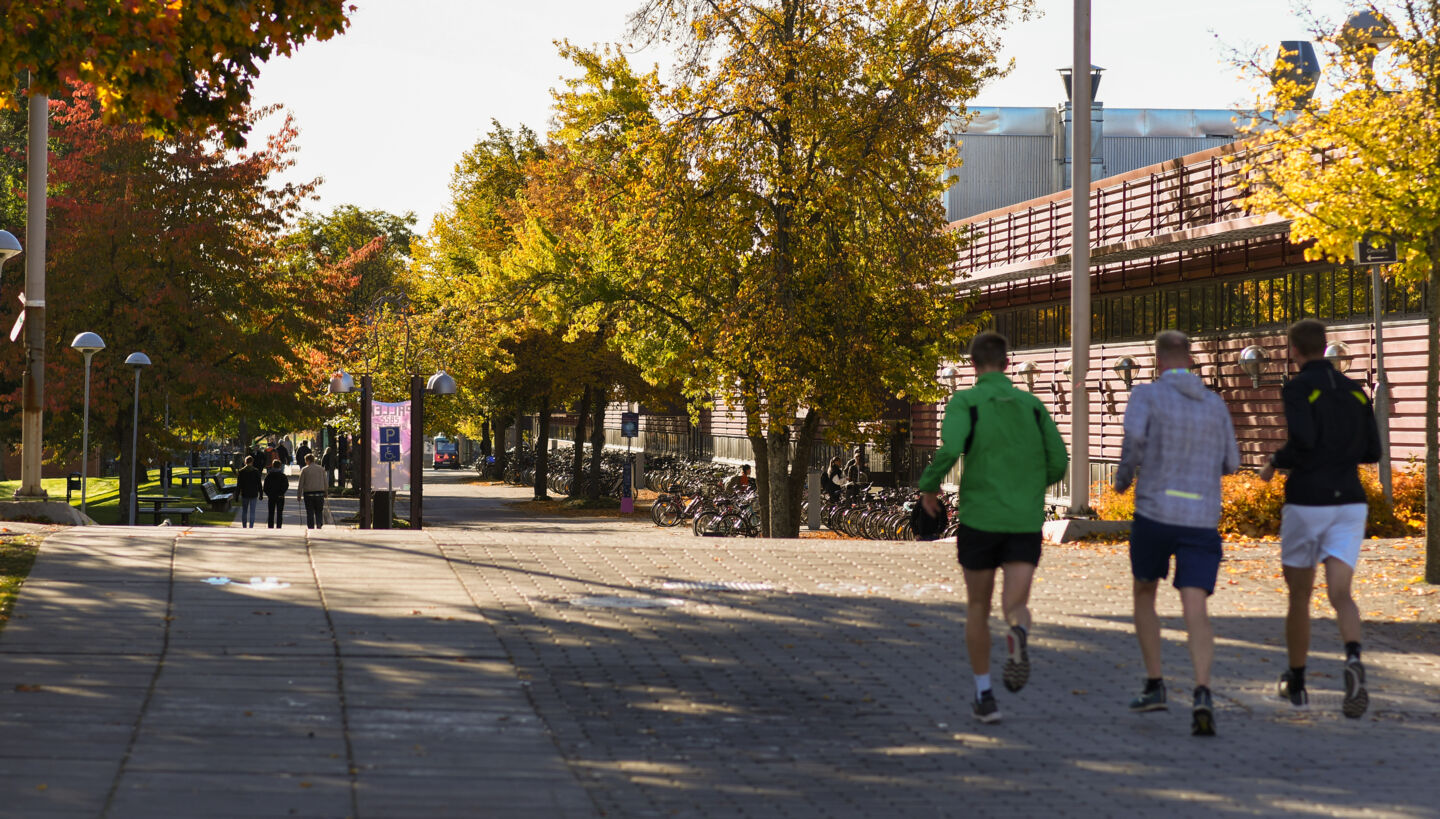
The Corso outside B Building on Campus Valla, with one of the self-driving campus minibuses in the back.

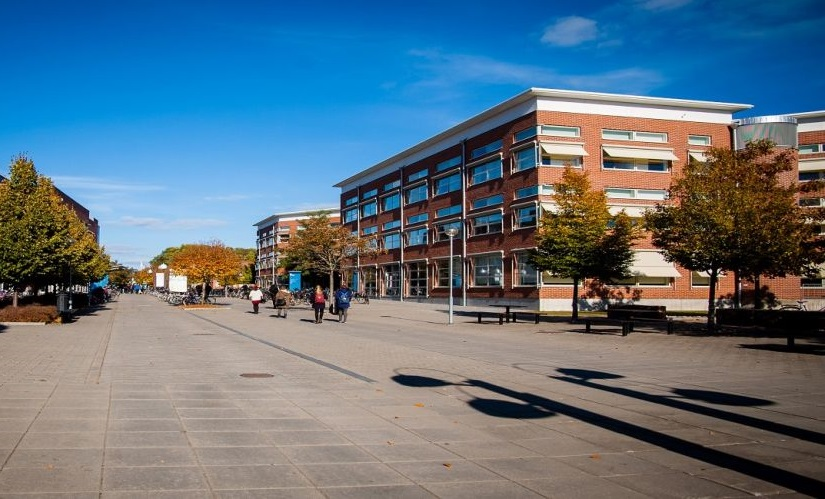
Key Building on Campus Valla. The main building for the Faculty of Educational Sciences.

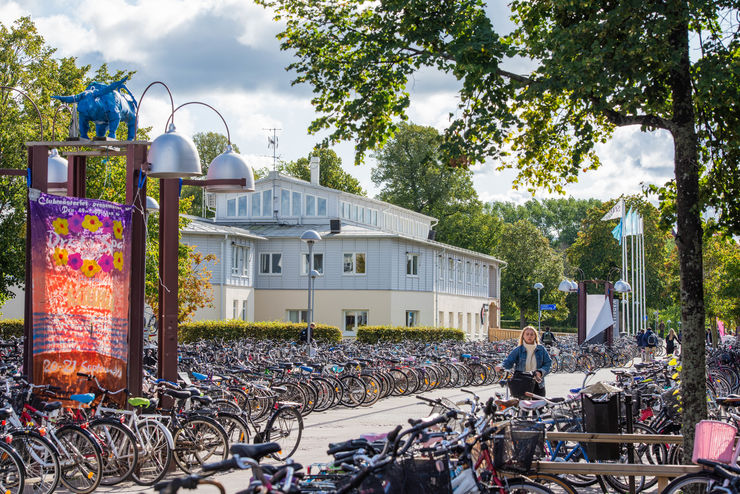
Student union building Kårallen on Campus Valla.

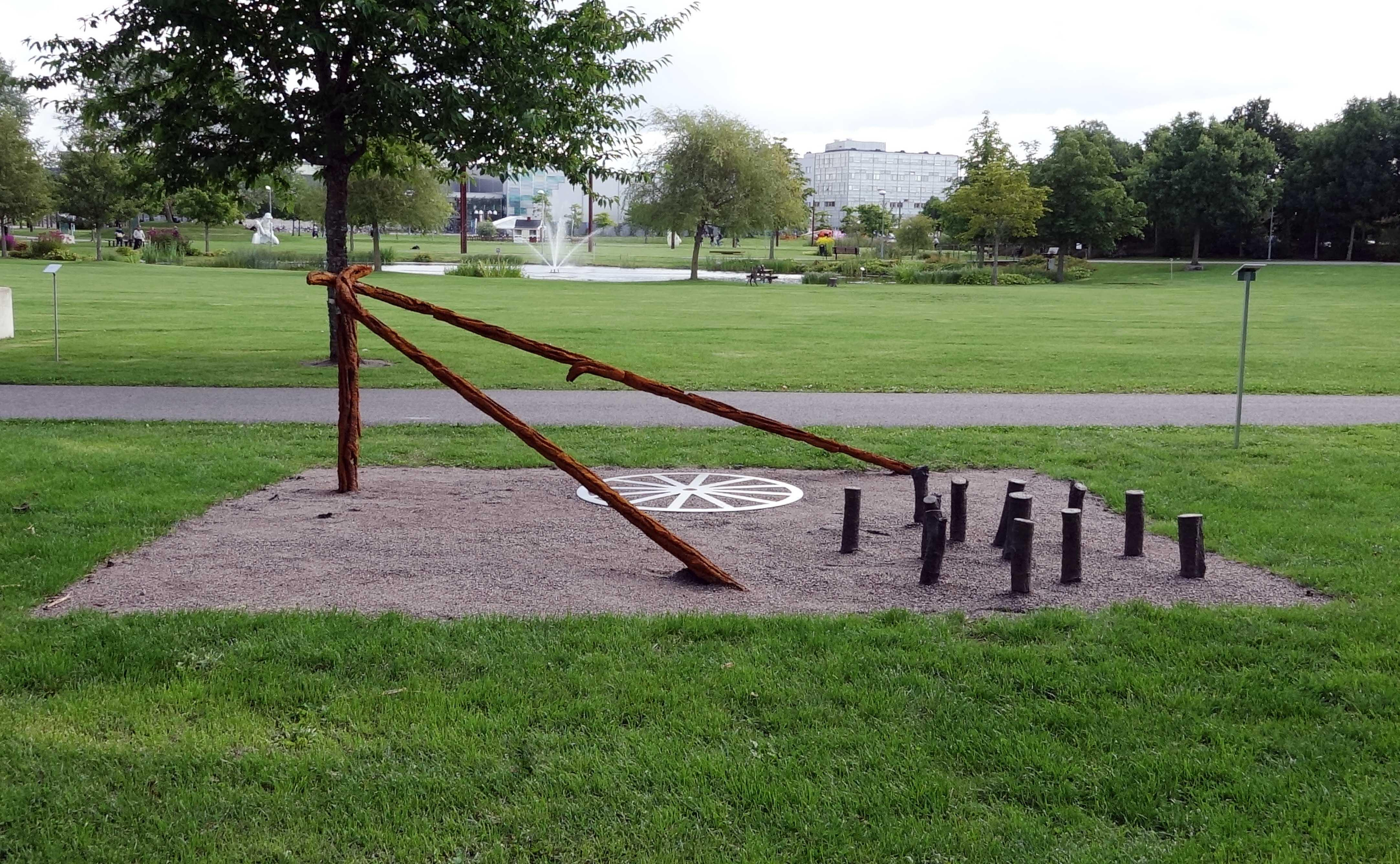
University Park on Campus Valla with an exhibit of Permanens, the permanent art exhibition in the park.

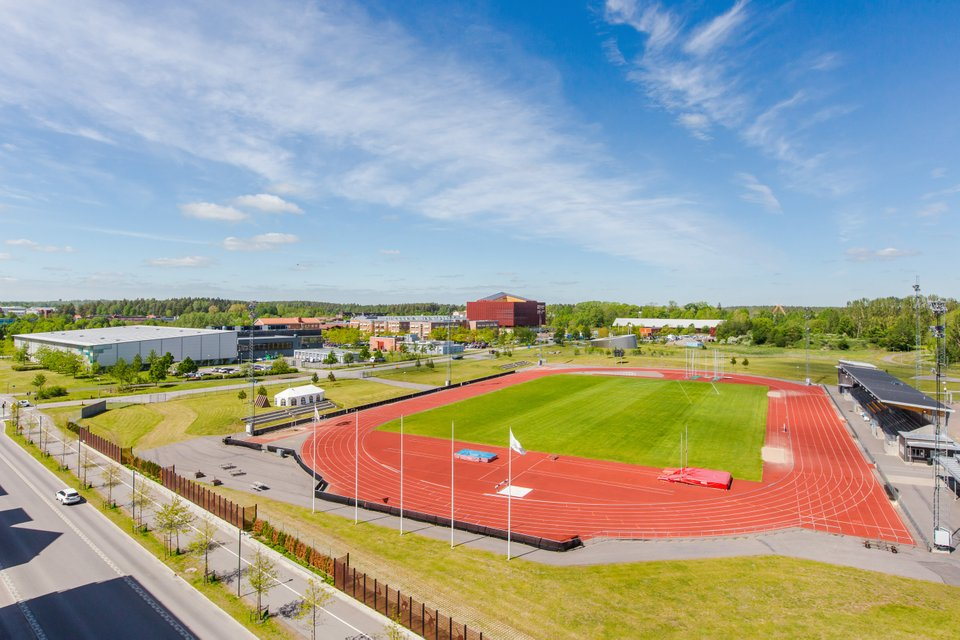
The sports stadium on Campus Valla. Campushallen — housing indoor sports facilities — is on the left.

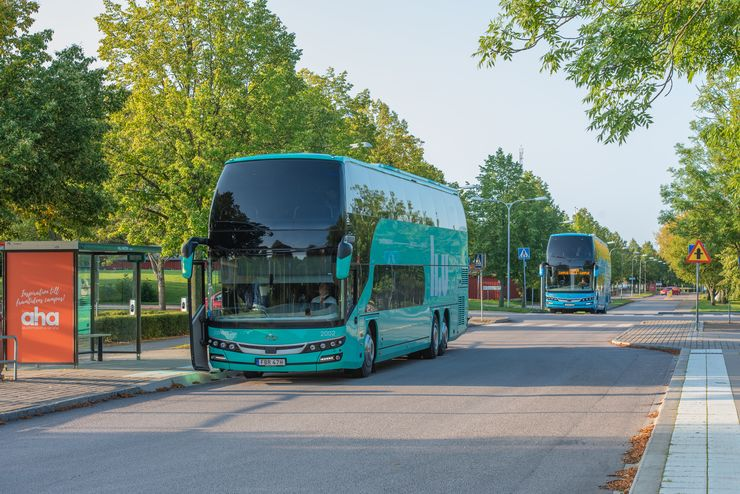
The Campus Bus at Campus Valla (connects Campus Valla, Campus US and Campus Norrköping).

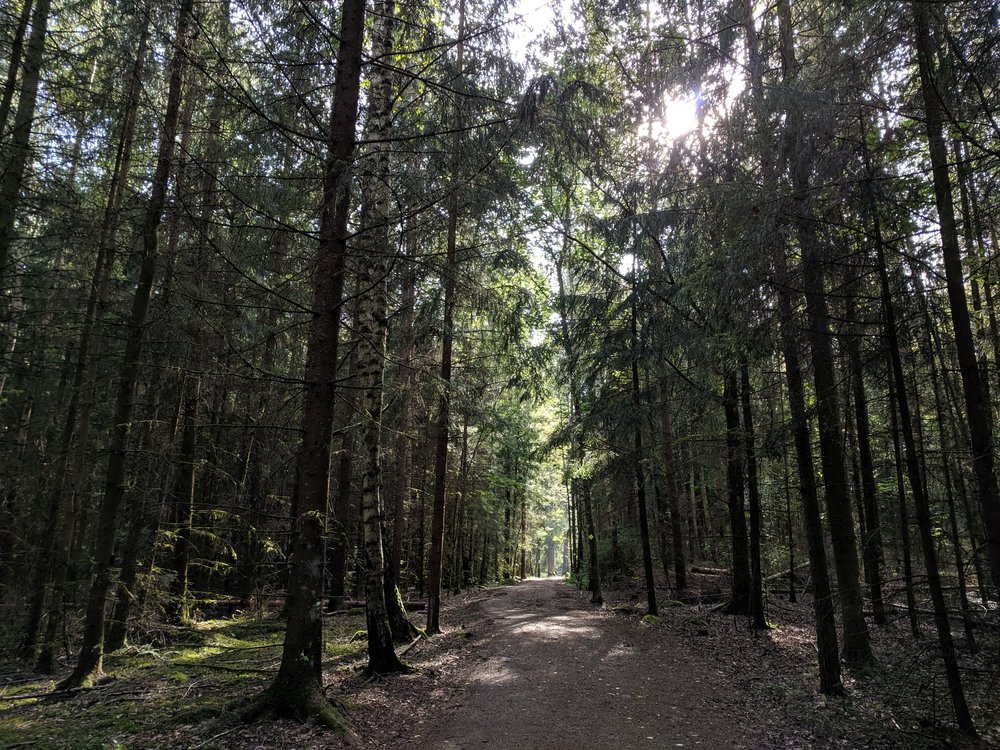
Hiking and running trail in the nature reserve Valla Wood next to Campus Valla.

=== Campus US ===
Campus US (the University Hospital campus) in Linköping houses the Faculty of Medicine and Health Sciences. The Department of Biomedical Engineering, which is part of the Faculty of Science and Engineering, is also housed at Campus US. Campus US is located next to Linköping University Hospital and Linköping City Park (The Garden Society, Swedish: Trädgårdsföreningen), and only a few hundred meters from the city centre.

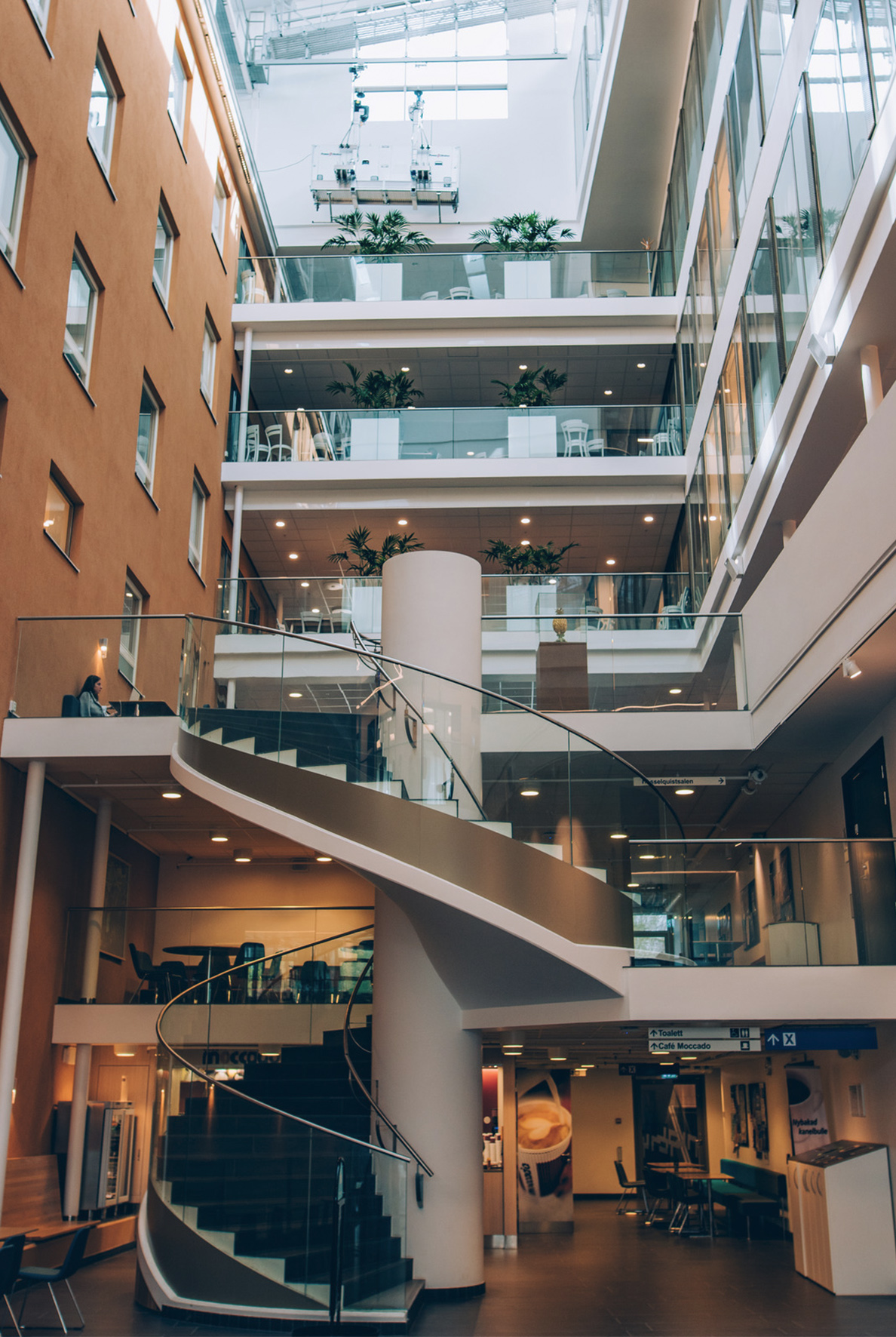
The atrium of Building 511 on Campus US.

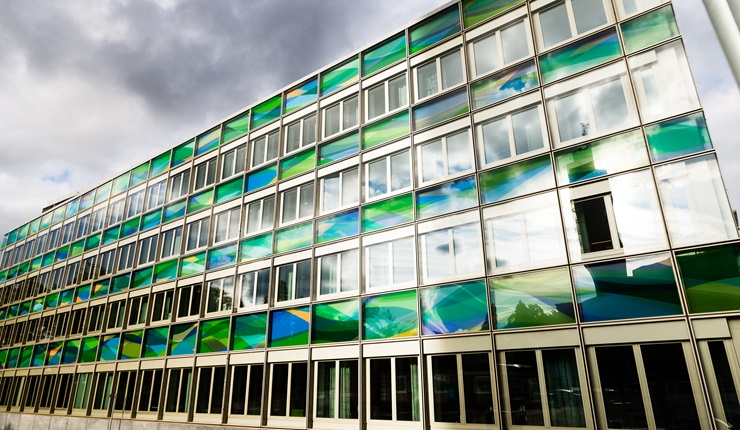
Building 511 on Campus US.

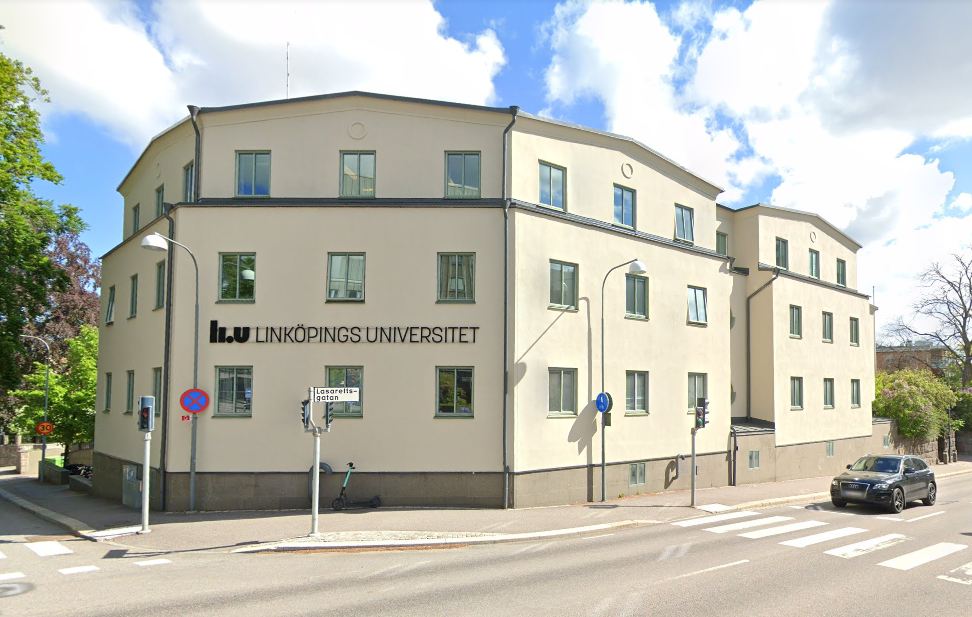
Dean's Office, Faculty of Medicine and Health Sciences on Campus US.

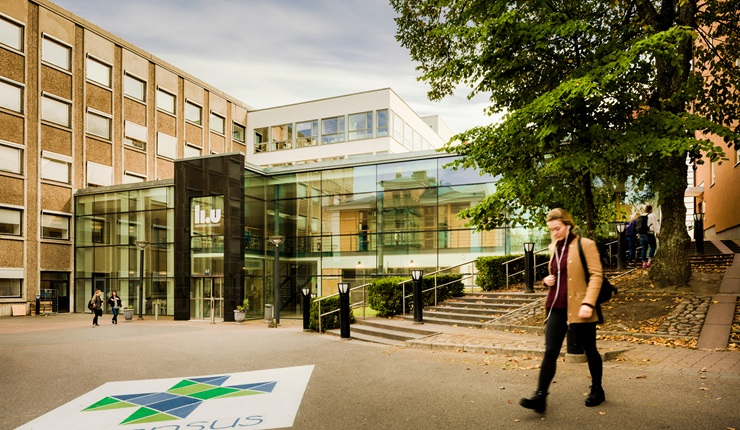
Entrance 65 on Campus US — the entrance to the Medical Library.

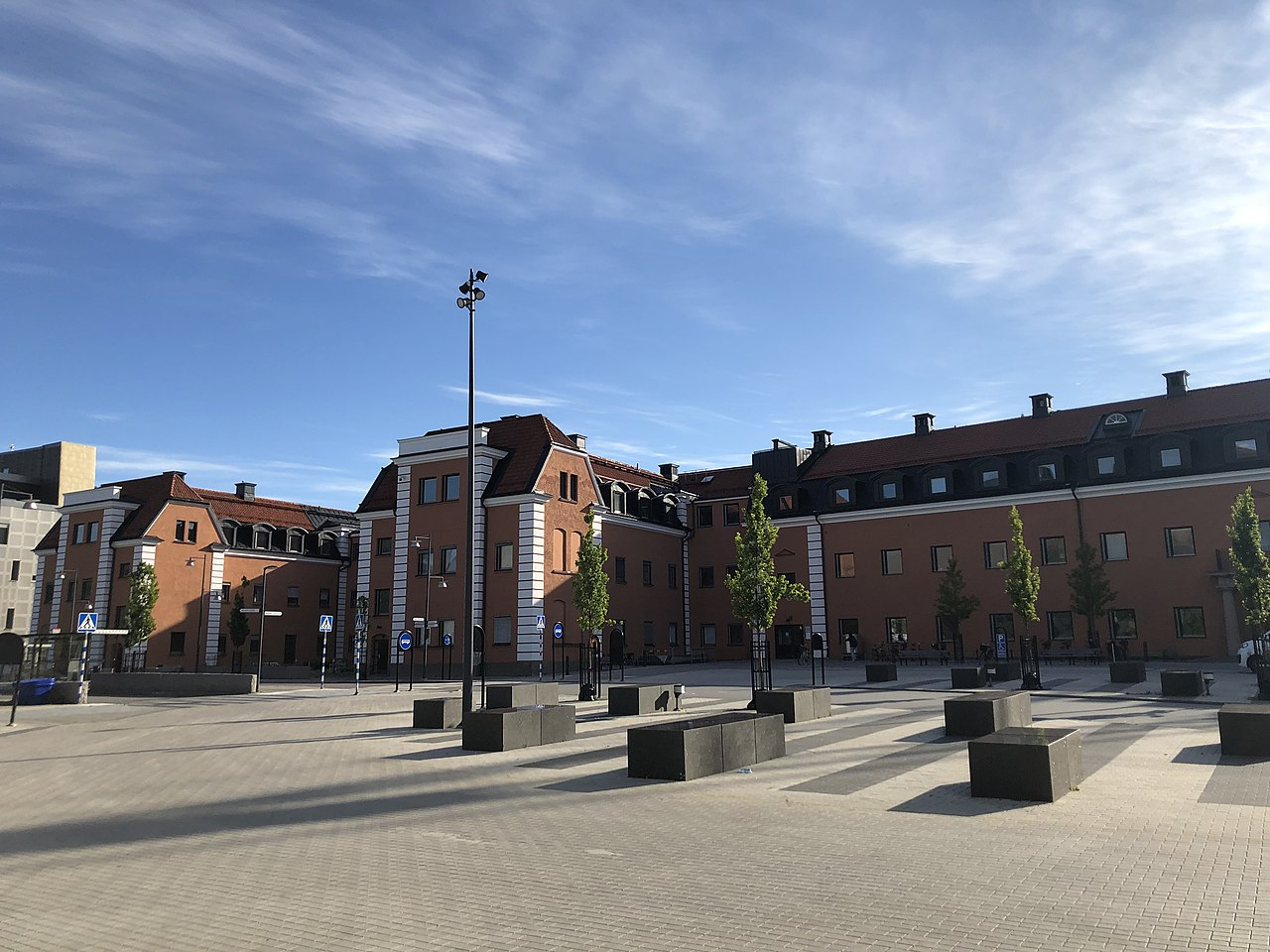
The Old Hospital on Campus US. Houses Clinicum, the clinical skills and simulation centre.

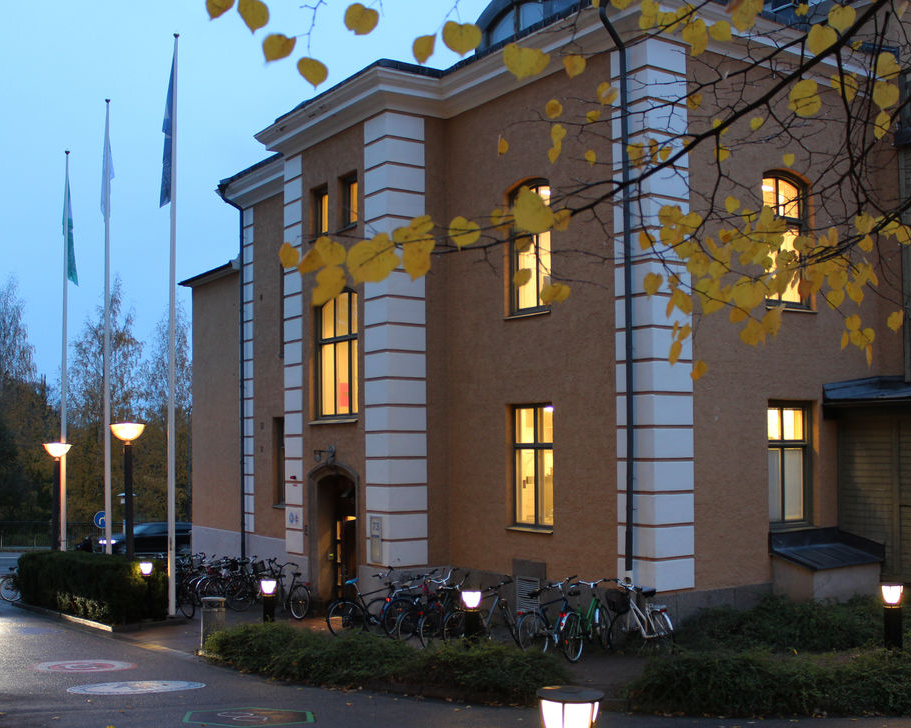
Örat on Campus US, the student union building for the Faculty of Medicine and Health Sciences.

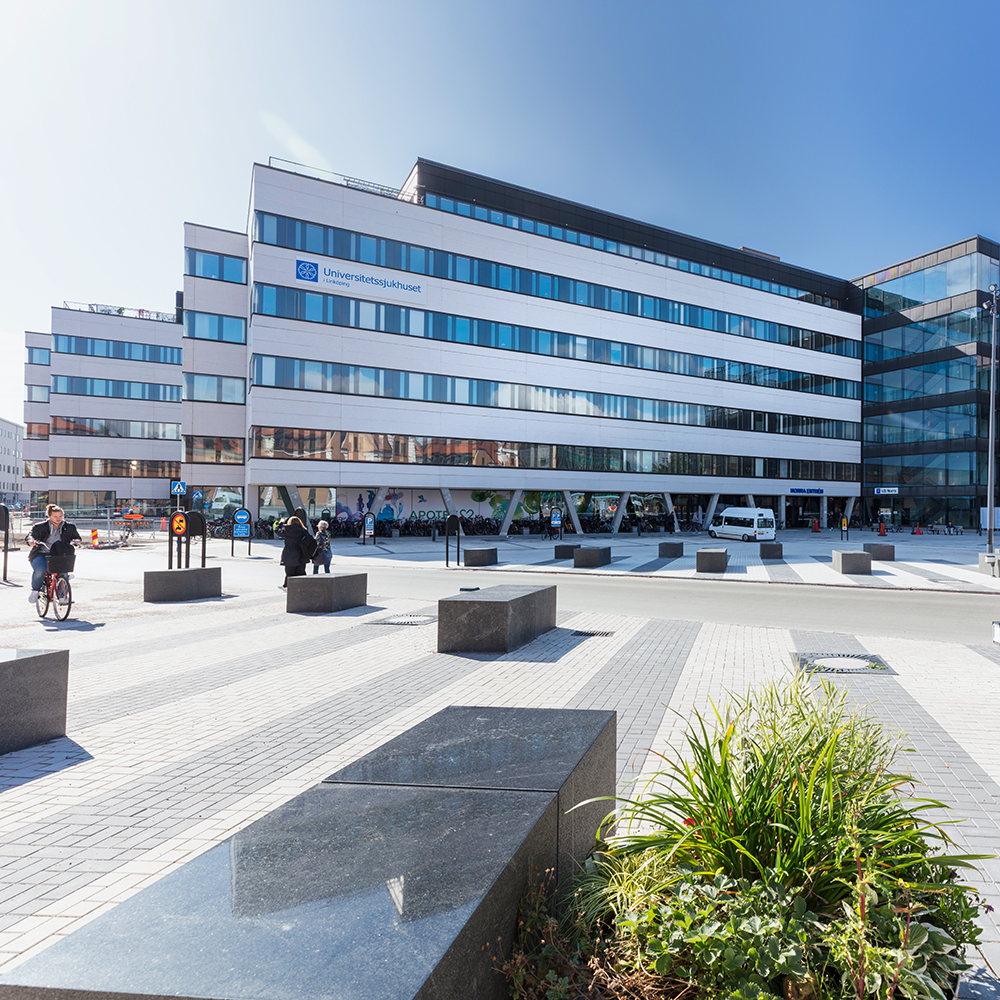
Main entrance of Linköping University Hospital on Campus US (north entrance).

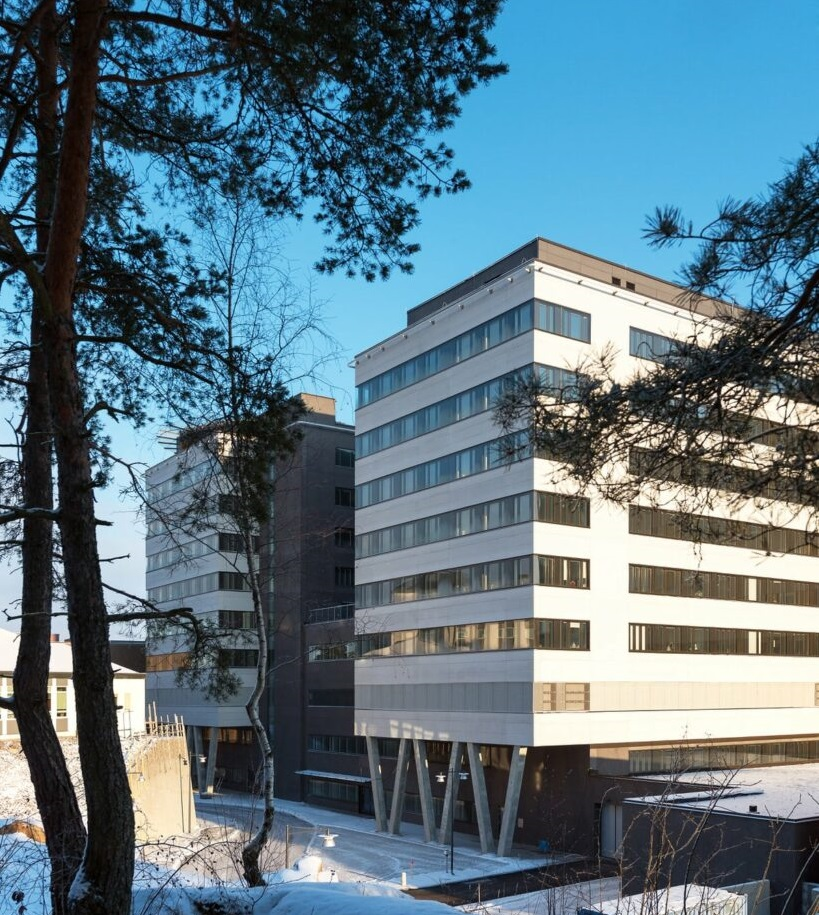
ER entrance of Linköping University Hospital on Campus US (west entrance).

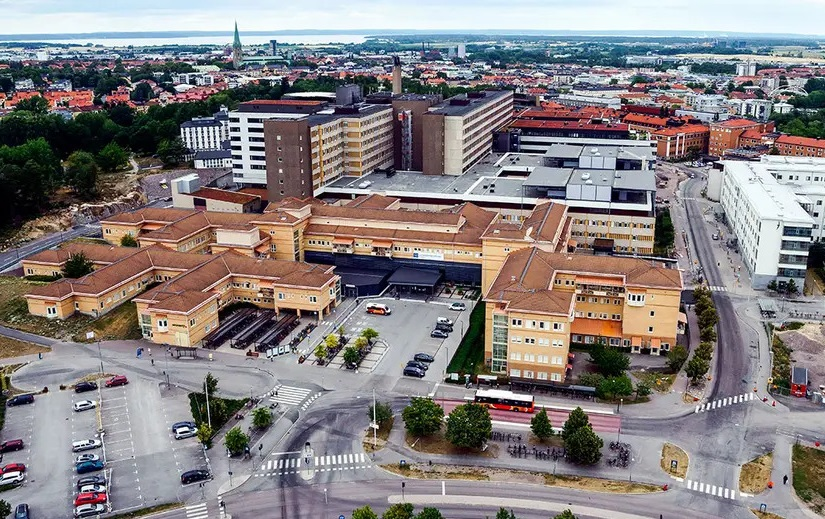
South entrance of Linköping University Hospital on Campus US, with the city centre in the background.

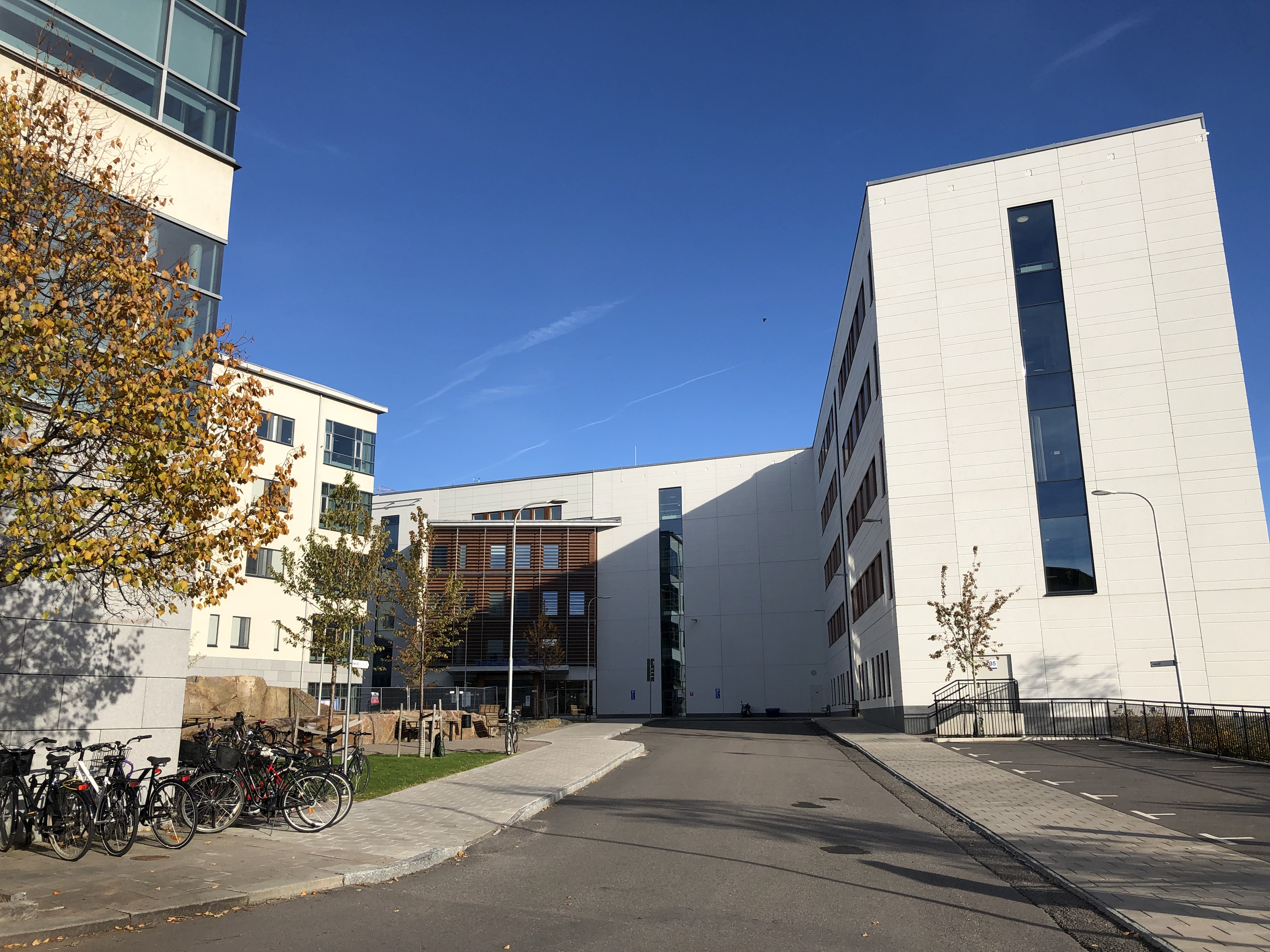
Tinnerbäckshuset on Campus US. Houses the psychiatric clinic.

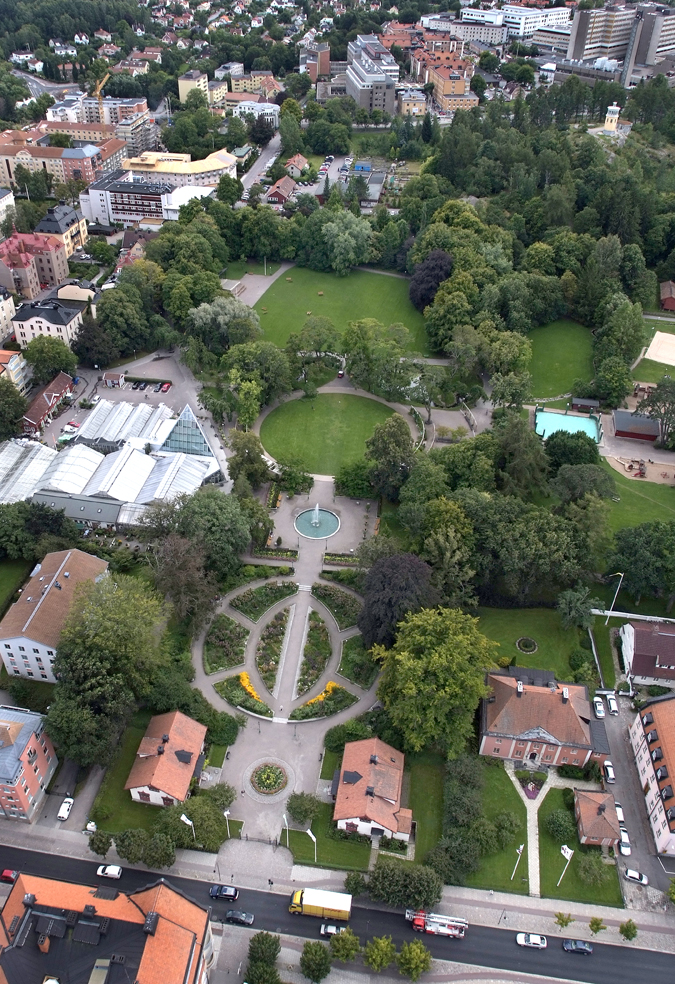
Aerial view of Linköping City Park with the edge of Campus US and Linköping University Hospital on the top.

=== Campus Norrköping ===
Campus Norrköping is a city campus in central Norrköping, 40 kilometers northeast of Linköping. Approximately one-fourth of the students are enrolled here. The campus is located in the historical Industrilandskapet district, with campus buildings on both sides of the river Motala ström connected by Campusbron, a footbridge.

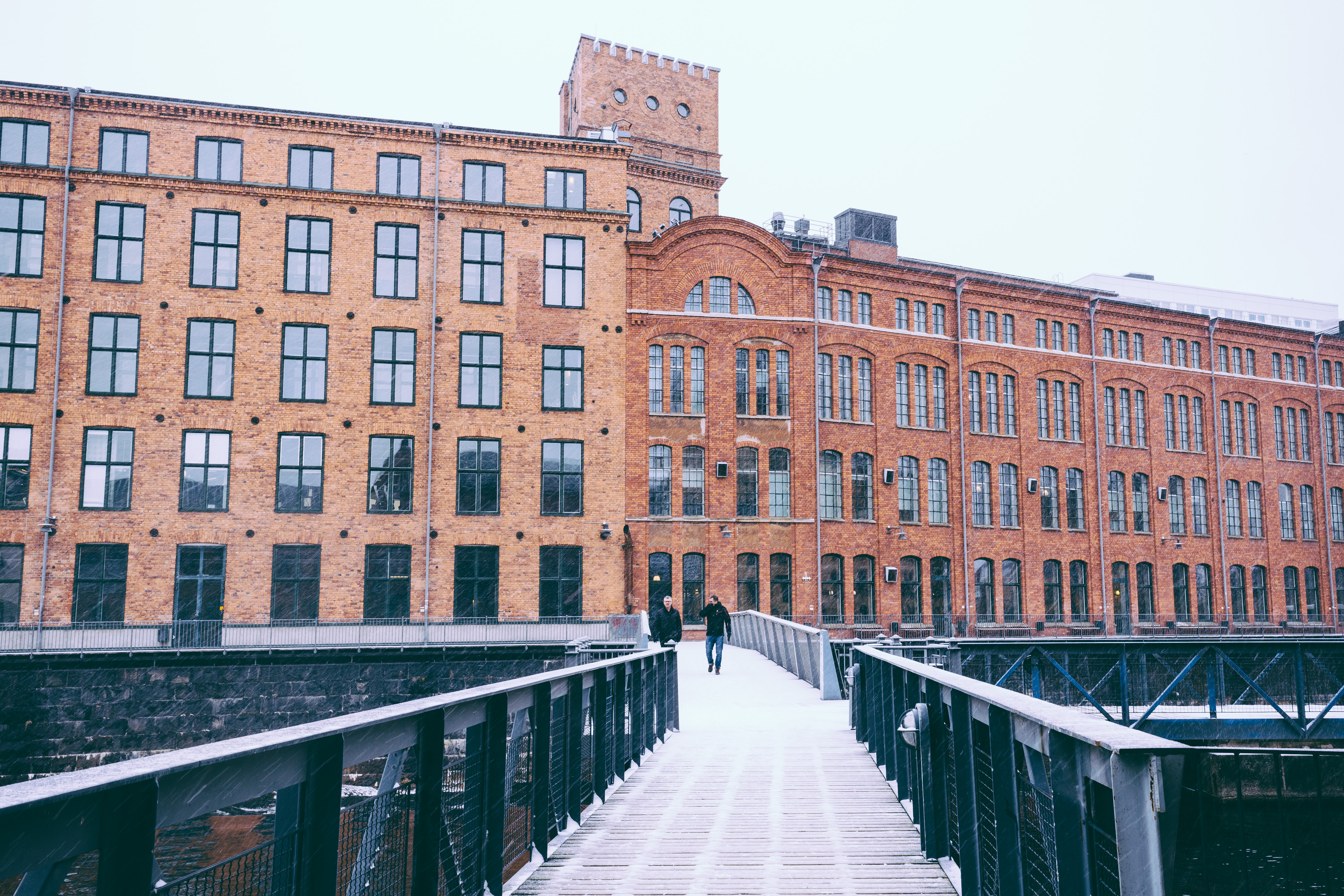
The west wing of Kåkenhus building on Campus Norrköping. Houses student services, the Laboratory of Organic Electronics and Clinicum.

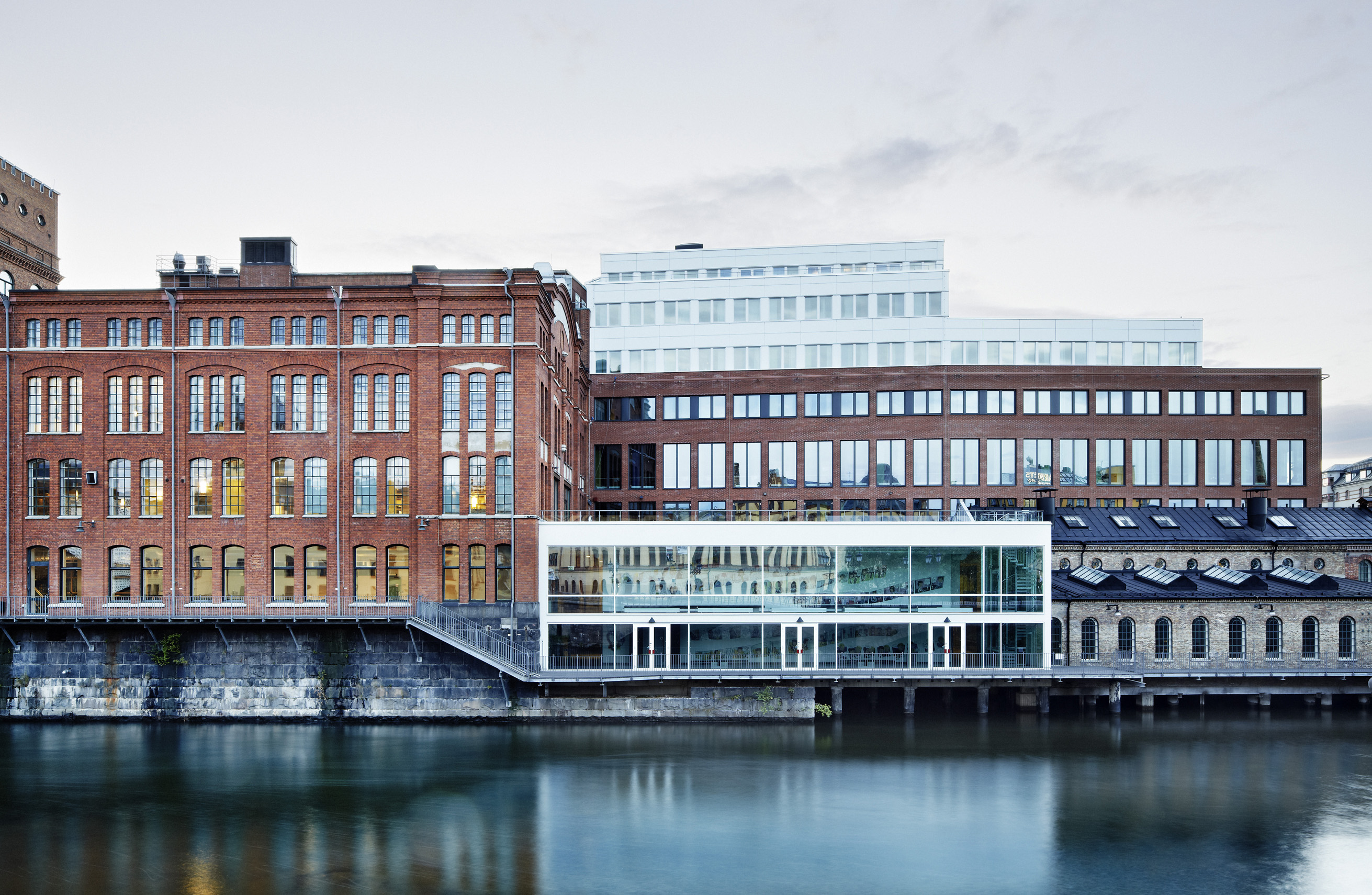
The east wing of Kåkenhus building on Campus Norrköping. Houses the campus library and the student union Trappan.

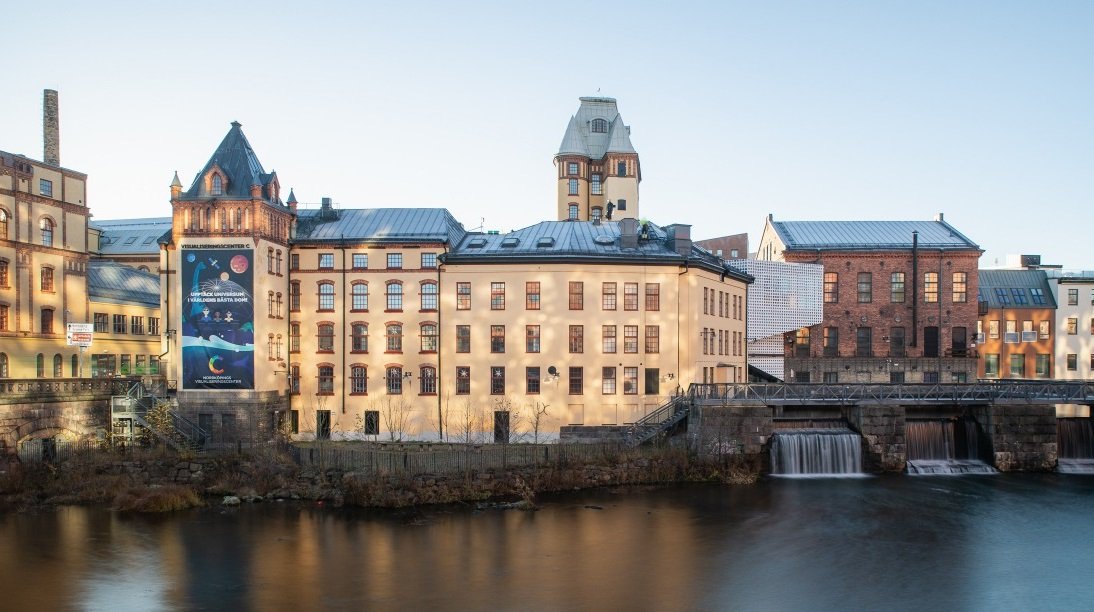
Visualiseringscenter C on Campus Norrköping. Houses C-Research.

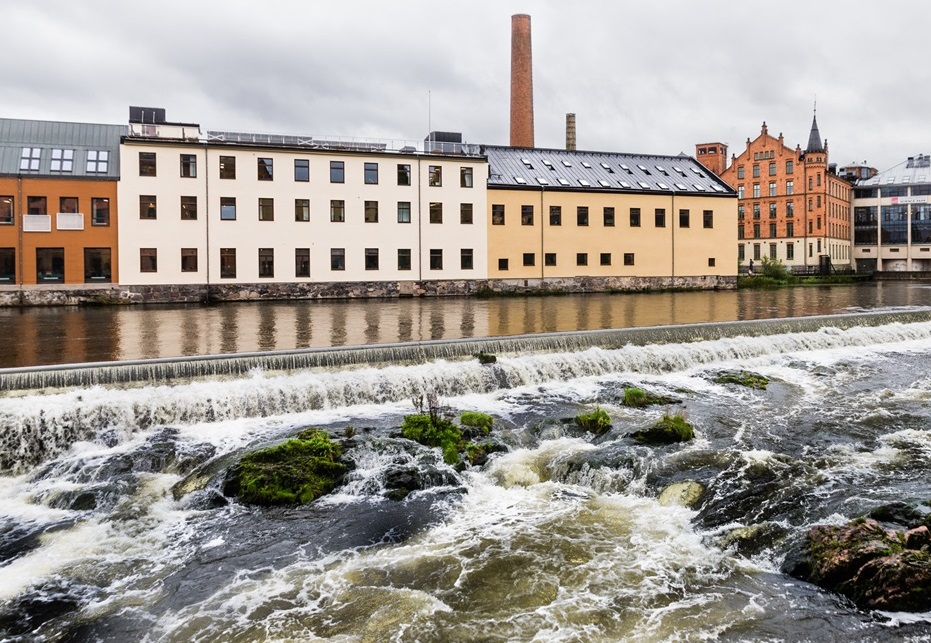
Kopparhammaren building and Motala Ström on Campus Norrköping. Houses the Institute for Analytical Sociology (IAS).

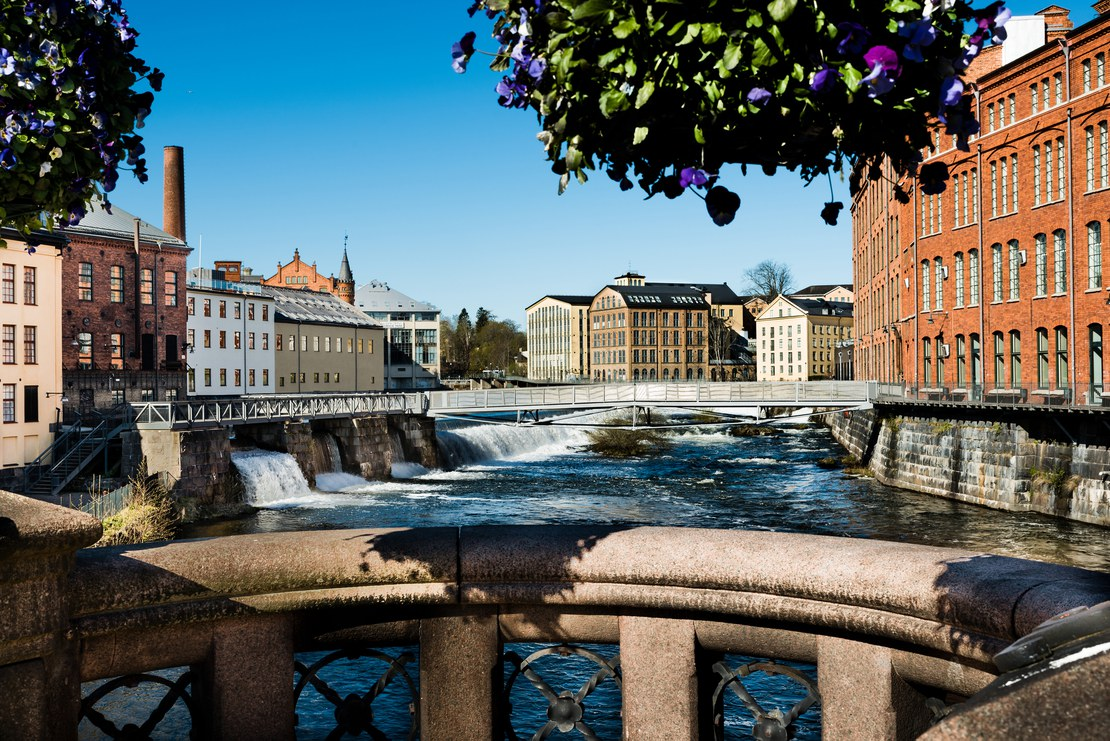
Campusbron, the footbridge over Motala ström on Campus Norrköping connecting Visualiseringscenter C, Kopparhammaren (left) and Kåkenhus (right).

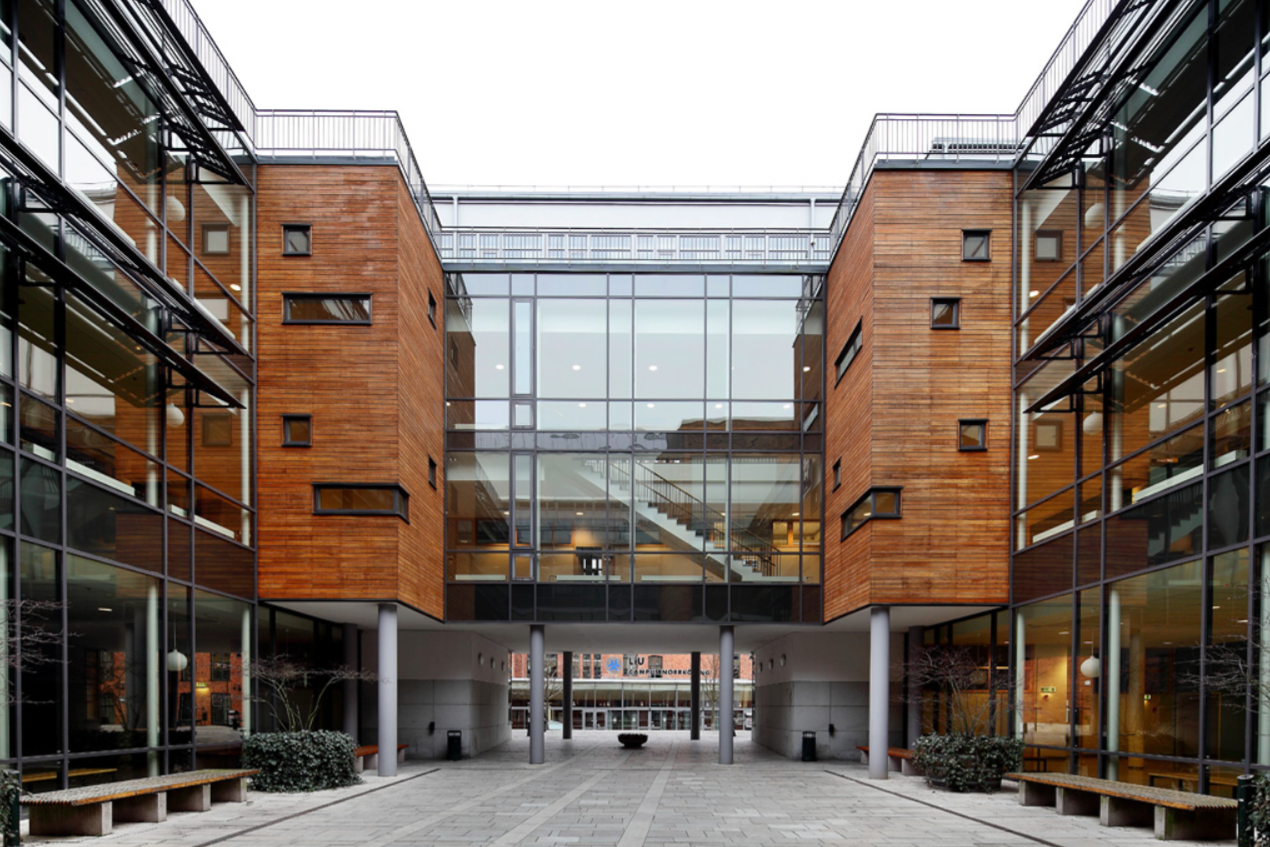
Täppan building on Campus Norrköping.

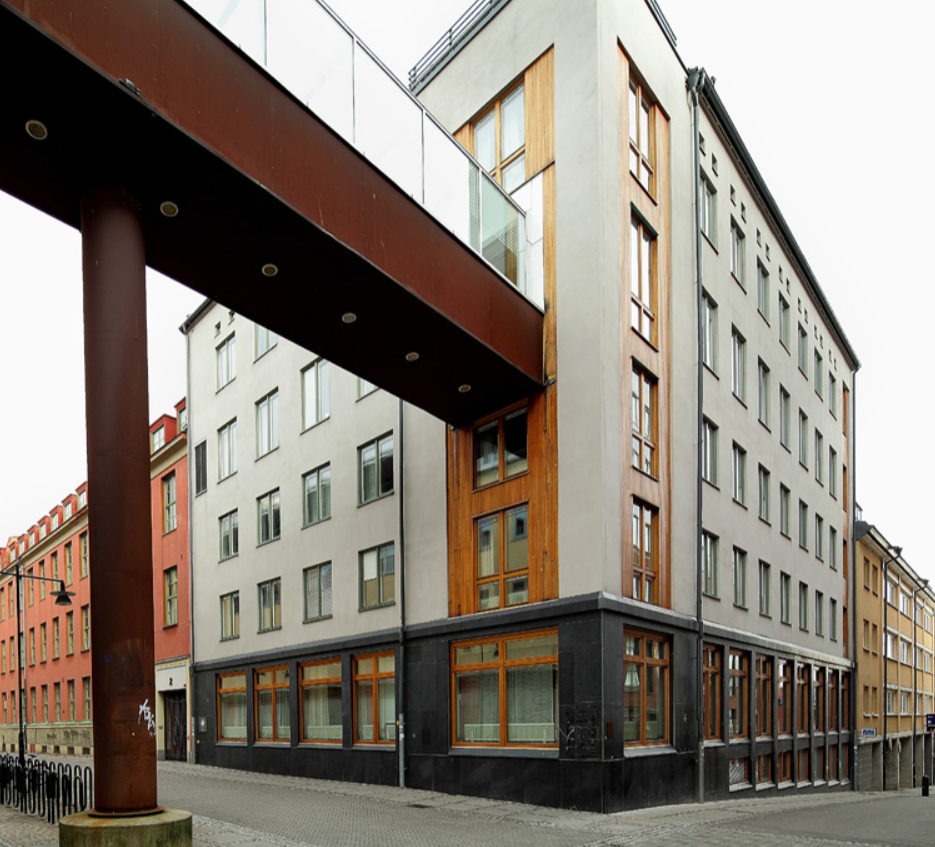
Spetsen building on Campus Norrköping.

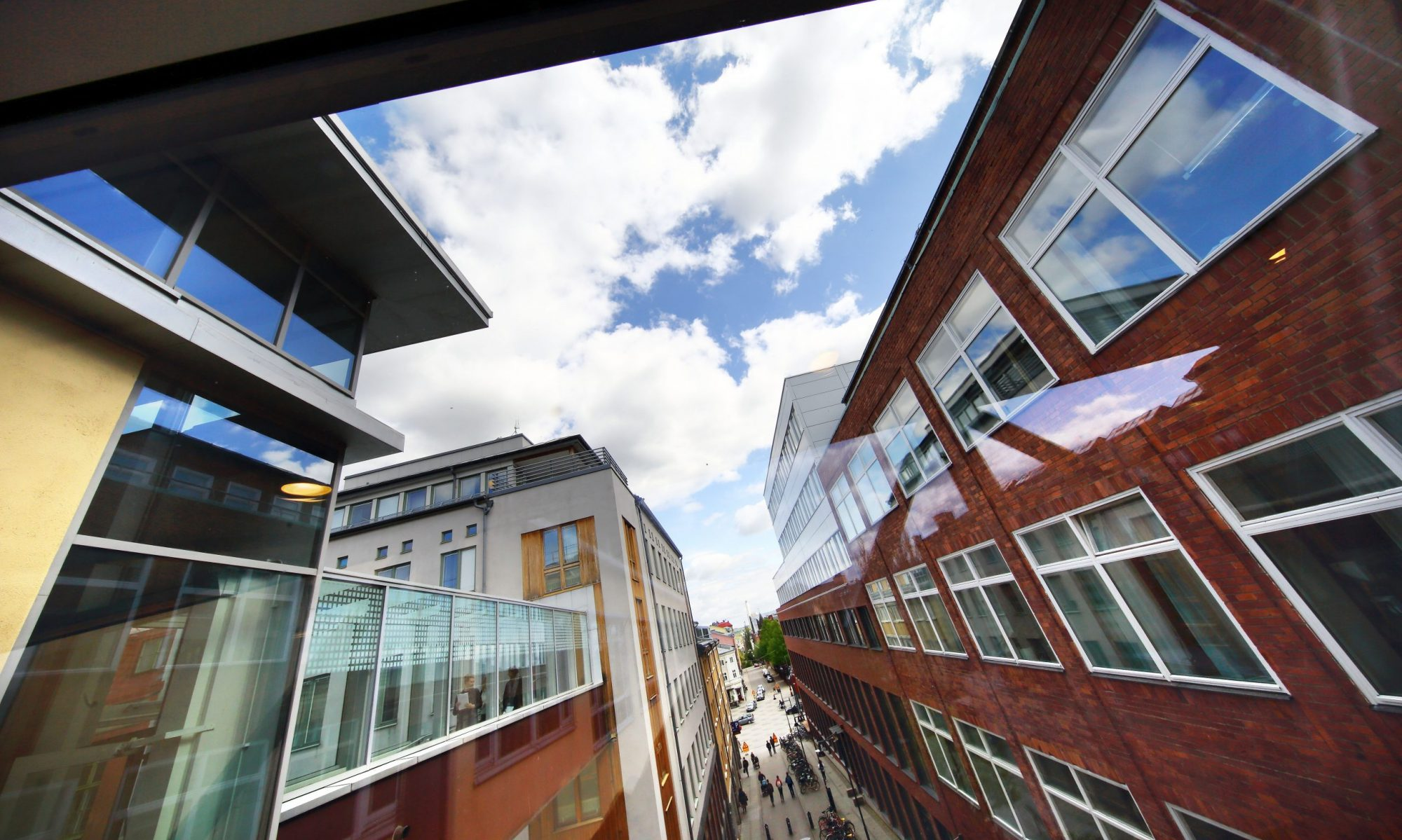
View from the elevated footbridge connecting Kåkenhus (right), Täppan (left) and Spetsen (left/middle) on Campus Norrköping.

=== Campus Lidingö ===
Campus Lidingö houses the Carl Malmsten School of Furniture (Malmstens Linköping University), which has been part of Linköping University since 2000. After almost 60 years in Stockholm, in 2009 the school moved into new premises in Lidingö in the inner Stockholm archipelago.

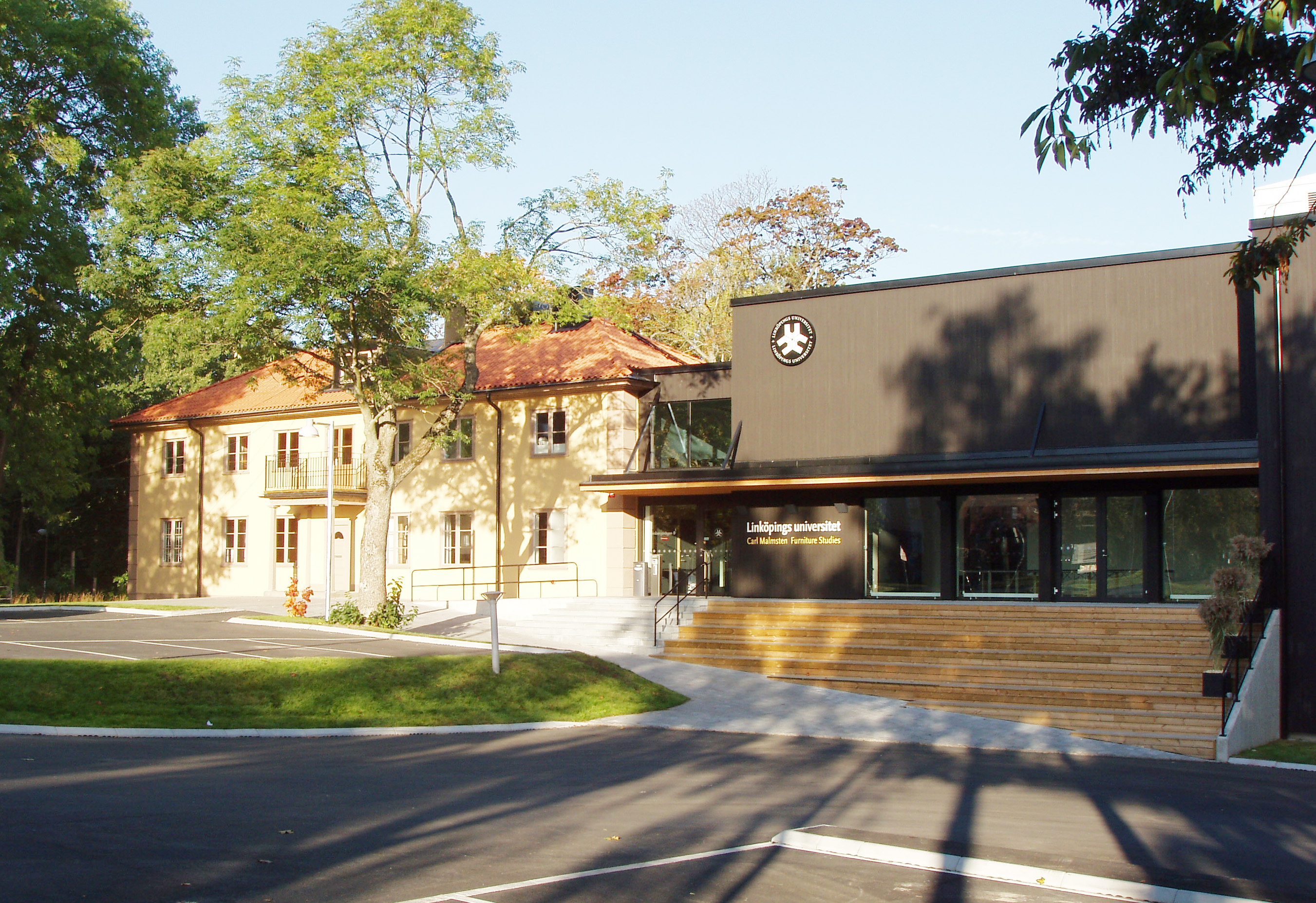
Carl Malmsten building on Campus Lidingö, main entrance.

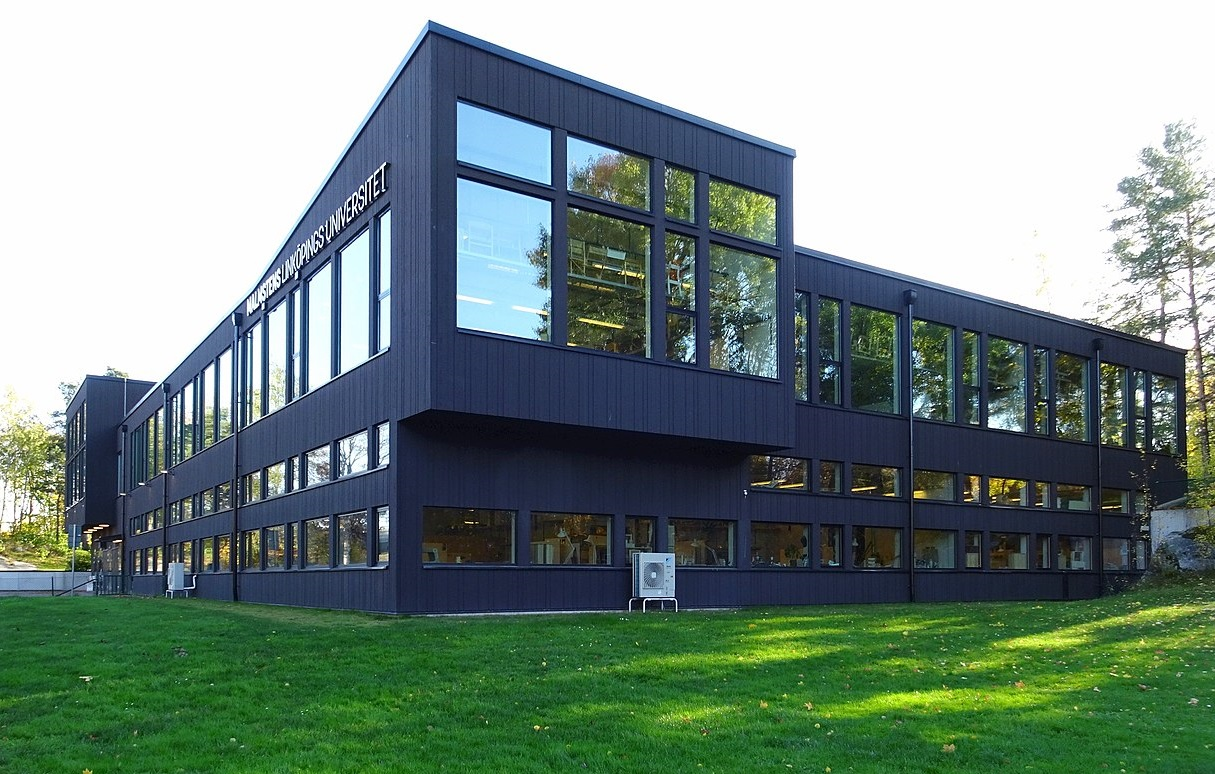
Carl Malmsten building on Campus Lidingö.

== Organization and administration ==
=== Faculties ===
Linköping University is organized into four faculties:

1. Faculty of Arts and Sciences (Swedish: Filosofiska fakulteten)
2. Faculty of Science and Engineering (also referred to as the Institute of Technology) (Swedish: Tekniska fakulteten (Tekniska högskolan))
3. Faculty of Medicine and Health Sciences (Swedish: Medicinska fakulteten) and Linköping University Hospital
4. Faculty of Educational Sciences (Swedish: Utbildningsvetenskap)

=== Departments ===
There are 12 large departments — in turn organized in divisions (not listed below) — intersecting several disciplines and often belonging under more than one faculty:

- Department of Behavioural Sciences and Learning
- Department of Biomedical and Clinical Sciences
- Department of Biomedical Engineering
- Department of Computer and Information Science
- Department of Culture and Society
- Department of Electrical Engineering
- Department of Health, Medicine and Caring Sciences
- Department of Management and Engineering
- Department of Mathematics
- Department of Physics, Chemistry and Biology
- Department of Science and Technology
- Department of Thematic Studies

=== Studies Units, Institutes, Centres ===
Thematic units cover broad, multidisciplinary fields. Institutes focus on narrower research areas.

- Institute for Analytical Sociology
- Didacticum LiU
- Center for Medical Image Science and Visualization (CMIV)
- National Supercomputer Centre in Sweden

=== Student organizations ===
Several student unions and nations exist at the university. Membership in a union or nation is voluntary.

==== Unions ====
Students are organized into different unions (and union sections) based on their field of study. There are three student unions charged with monitoring education at Linköping University:

- Consensus: Student union for the Faculty of Medicine and Health Sciences, organized into 9 sections
- LinTek: Student union for the Faculty of Science and Engineering, organized into 15 sections
- StuFF: Student union for the Faculty of Arts and Sciences and the Faculty of Educational Sciences, organized into 19 sections

==== Nations ====
There are three active student nations at the university:

- Wermlands nation
- Västgöta nation
- Vargtass - Norrlands nation

== Academics ==
=== Education ===
Linköping University offers education at the basic and advanced levels via 120 study programmes, 550 single-subject courses and specialised as well as interdisciplinary postgraduate studies. A large number of the degree programmes lead to qualified professional degrees in fields such as medicine, business and economics, teacher education and engineering. Many of the programmes are interdisciplinary, combining for example industrial management and engineering, medicine and engineering, or integrating economics, law and languages.

In 1986 the Faculty of Medicine and Health Sciences became the first faculty in Sweden to put problem-based learning into practice within medical training and health-care programmes.

In 2000, the Massachusetts Institute of Technology in collaboration with three Swedish universities — Linköping University, Chalmers University of Technology and the KTH Royal Institute of Technology — formally founded the Conceive Design Implement Operate (CDIO) Initiative, a framework for engineering education. CDIO developed into an international collaboration, with universities around the world adopting the same framework.

In 2007, the Medical Programme and the Department of Electrical Engineering, Control systems were recognized as Centres of Excellence in Higher Education by the Swedish National Agency for Higher Education. Linköping University was awarded two out of eight Centres of Excellence recognized at Swedish universities, with the recognition based on a thorough quality assessment by a panel of experts.

=== Research ===
Linköping University pursues research and postgraduate studies within the fields of technology, medicine, and humanities, natural, educational, social and behavioural sciences. It is particularly noted for its openness to multidisciplinary research and, in 1980, was the first Swedish university to introduce interdisciplinary thematic research at the Faculty of Arts and Sciences, and a cross-subject, interdisciplinary perspective in graduate schools for PhD students.

Linköping University receives research grants from the Swedish government within five strategic research areas: IT and mobile communication, materials science, security and emergency management, e-Science and transport research.

=== Research centres ===
- Control, Autonomy, and Decision-making in Complex Systems (Linnaeus Centre CADICS)
- Gender Excellence (GEXcel), The Swedish Research Council Centre of
- Hearing and Deafness (Linnaeus Centre HEAD), Research on
- The National Supercomputer Centre, a provider of national supercomputing resources
- Novel Functional Materials (Linnécentrum LiLI-NFM), Linköping Linnaeus Initiative for
- Organic Bioelektronics (OBOE), Strategic Research Centre for
- Norrköping Visualization Center C, in cooperation with the City of Norrköping and Norrköping Science Park and Interactive Institute. The Dome Theatre, constructed in 2009, is the most technically advanced dome in northern Europe.
- The Center for Disaster Medicine and Traumatology (KMC). A National Research Center for Traumatology assigned by the Swedish National Board of Health and Welfare.

For a complete list of centres, see Organisation

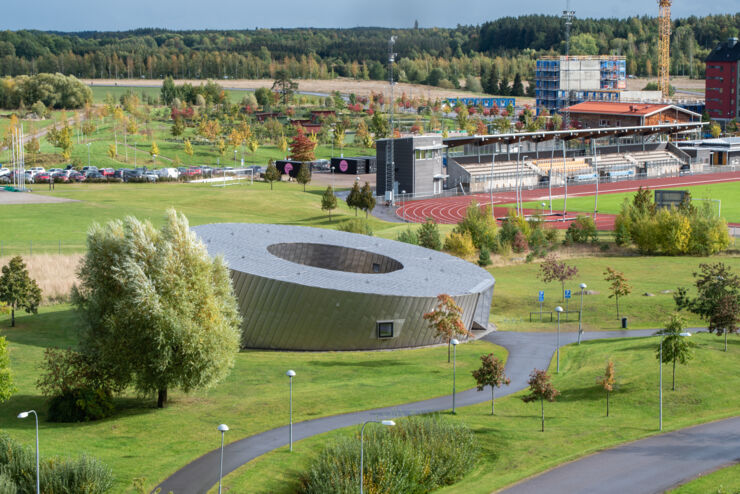
Ångströmhuset on Campus Valla is a laboratory housing Arwen, one of the world's sharpest transmission electron microscopes.

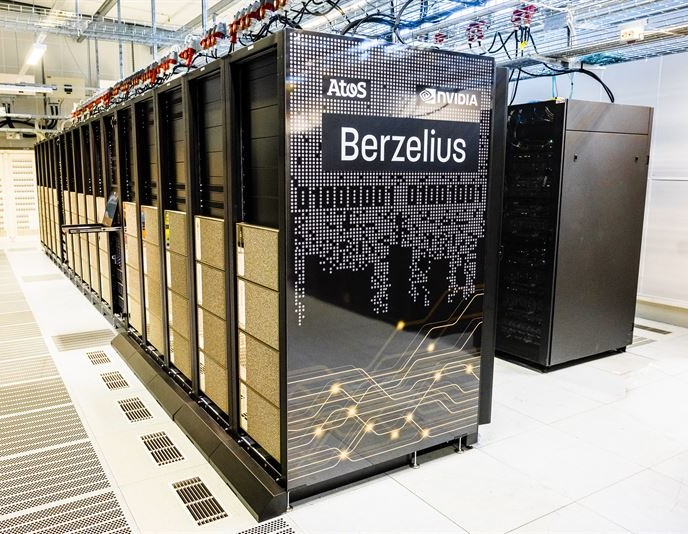
Sweden's fastest supercomputer Berzelius — specialized for AI — at Linköping University's National Supercomputer Centre (NSC) on Campus Valla.

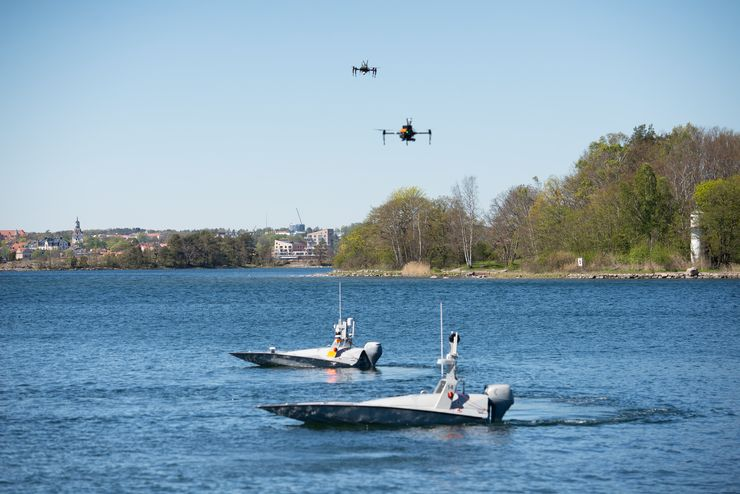
Autonomous aerial and surface drone rescue exercise using AI within WASP, Sweden's largest research program ever, hosted by Linköping University.

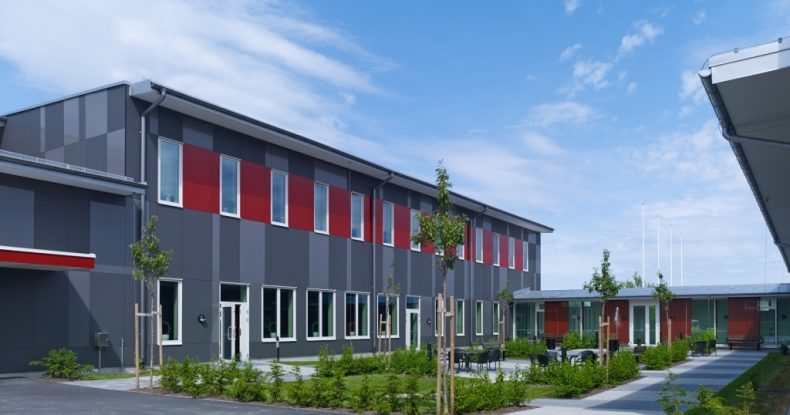
The Center for Disaster Medicine and Traumatology (KMC) on Campus Valla.

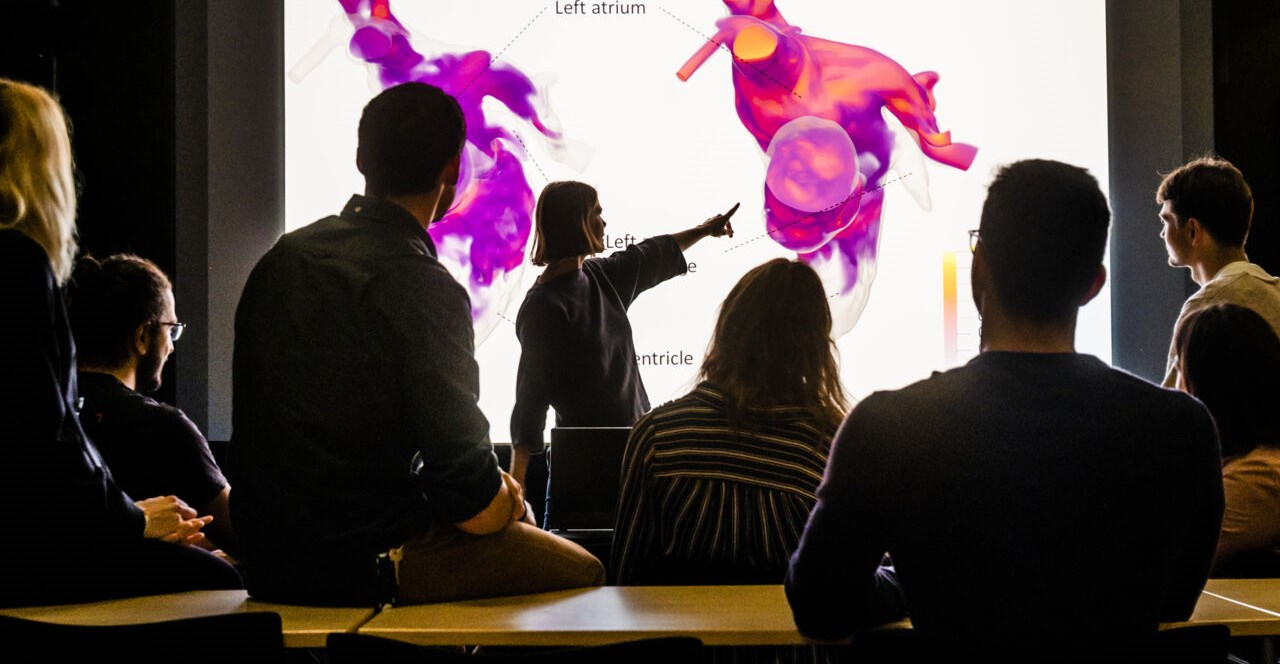
Research school seminar at the Center for Medical Image Science and Visualization (CMIV) on Campus US.

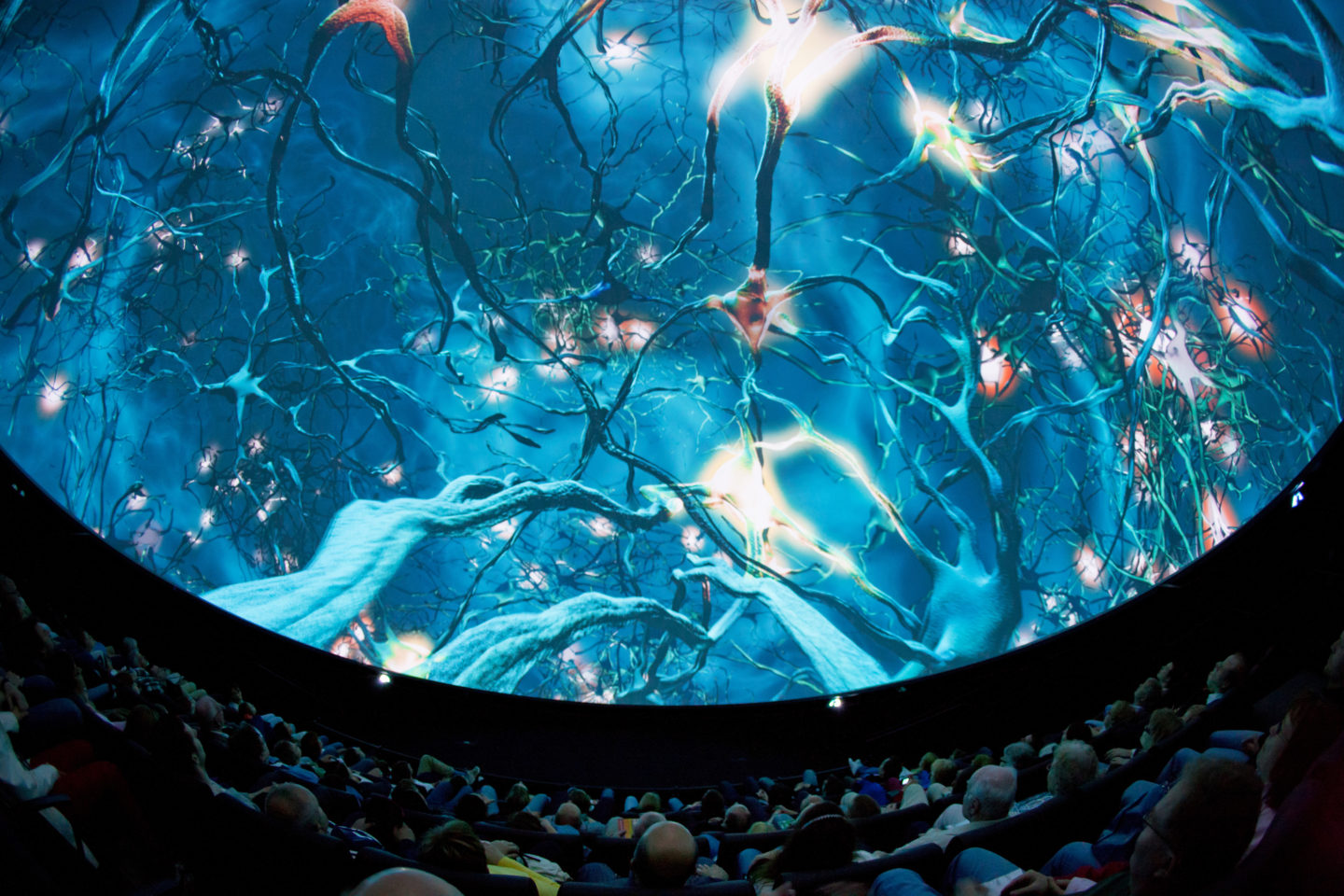
The Dome Theatre in Visualiseringscenter C on Campus Norrköping, as of 2019 the world's best dome for 3D image quality.

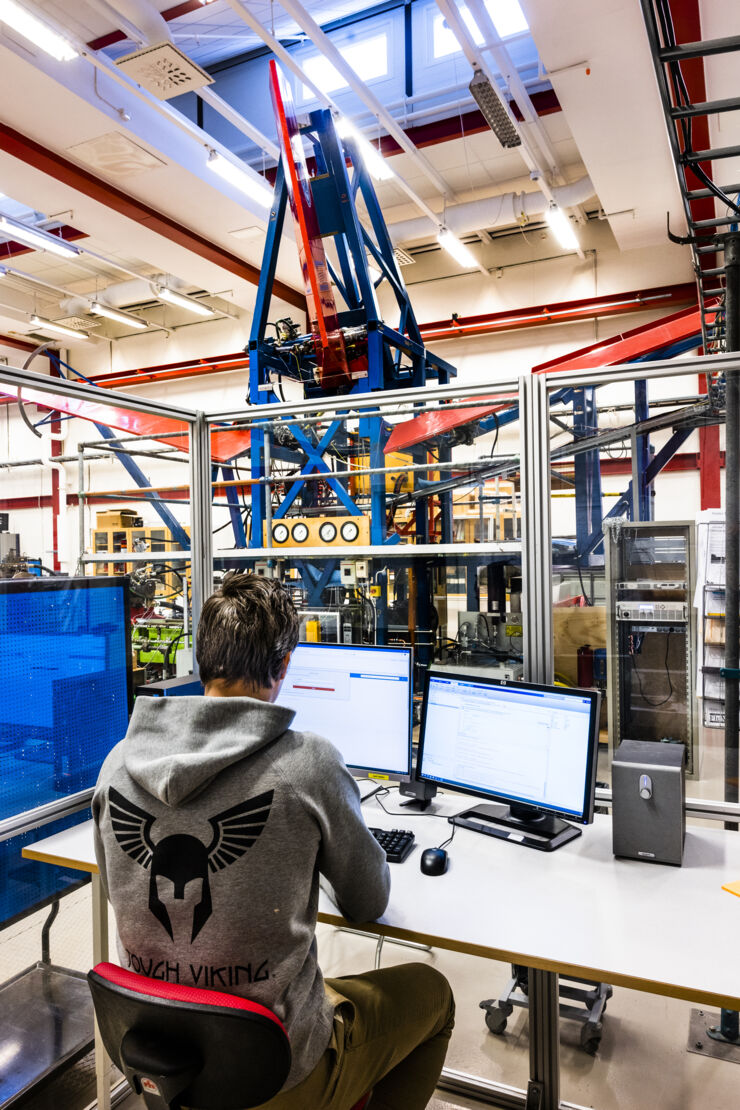
The Iron Bird on Campus Valla, used for aeronautical engineering research, such as fighter jets. Donated by Linköping University's strategic partner SAAB.

=== Rankings ===
University rankings

Global – Overall
- ARWU World: 301–400 (2026)
- QS World: =308 (2027)
- THE World: 201–250 (2026)
- THE Reputation: 201–300 (2025)

Global – Science and engineering
- ARWU Electrical & Electronic Engineering: 76–100 (2022)
- THE Engineering: 101–125 (2022)

Linköping University has an emphasis on engineering and technology, and in the 2022 ARWU ranking it places in the top 100 in the following engineering subjects: Telecommunication Engineering 51–75, Electrical & Electronic Engineering 76–100, Materials Science & Engineering 76–100, Nanoscience & Nanotechnology 76–100 and Energy Science & Engineering 76–100.

In the 2022 THE ranking, Linköping University places in the top 125 in the following broad categories: Engineering & Technology 101–125, Business & Economics 101–125 and Psychology 101–125. In addition, it places in the top 200 in: Computer Science 151–175 and Social Sciences 176–200.

Linköping University Hospital places 192 in Newsweek's 2025 World's Best Hospitals ranking.

In the TOP500 ranking of the world's supercomputers, as of June 2026, Linköping University's National Supercomputer Centre hosts five supercomputers, including Sweden's fastest supercomputer Arrhenius:

1. Arrhenius in place 42
2. Berzelius 3 in place 259
3. Berzelius in place 294
4. Berzelius 2 in place 337
5. Tetralith in place 454

== Science parks and business incubator ==
Two science parks — Linköping Science Park and Norrköping Science Park — are closely connected to Linköping University. The university's business incubator LEAD is also housed in these parks.

=== LEAD - business incubator ===
LEAD (acronym for LiU Entrepreneurship and Development) is Linköping University's business incubator. In 2023, LEAD was selected as a Sweden's incubator in NATO's Defence Innovation Accelerator for the North Atlantic (DIANA). The CEO of LEAD (currently Catharina Sandberg) was selected as a member of the Council for Defence Innovation (Swedish: Försvarsinnovationsrådet), launched by the Swedish Ministry of Defence in 2024, with the Minister for Defence serving as its chairman (currently Pål Jonson).

=== Linköping Science Park ===
Linköping Science Park is a multi-site science park, with four sites throughout Linköping and the surrounding region. As of 2023, Linköping Science Park hosts approximately 600 companies, from start-ups to multinationals, with a total of 14,000 employees. The largest residents are Ericsson, IFS, Infor, Sectra, Combitech, Releasy and CGI Group. Major multinationals such as ARRIS Group, Flextronics, Autoliv, Toyota Industries and Beyond Gravity are also represented. Linköping Science Park's four sites are:

1. Mjärdevi is the first and main site, located next to Campus Valla (Linköping University's main campus), Linköping Golf Club and Malmen Airbase. Mjärdevi is the main site for Linköping University's business incubator LEAD.
2. Ebbepark, with game development, medtech and visualization among represented industries.
3. Cavok District is a new and developing site, focusing on aviation, space and advanced materials. Cavok District adjoins Linköping City Airport and Linköping University's strategic partner SAAB's main office, as well as its main site for development and manufacturing, including the development and manufacturing of fighter jets such as the Saab JAS 39 Gripen, and airborne early warning & control (AEW&C) platforms such as the GlobalEye. SAAB's Generic Future Fighter is an ongoing project in collaboration with Linköping University, led by the Swedish Air Force to develop a fifth-generation low-observable fighter jet.
4. Vreta Kluster focuses on the green industry. Located in Ljungsbro, 8 kilometers outside Linköping.
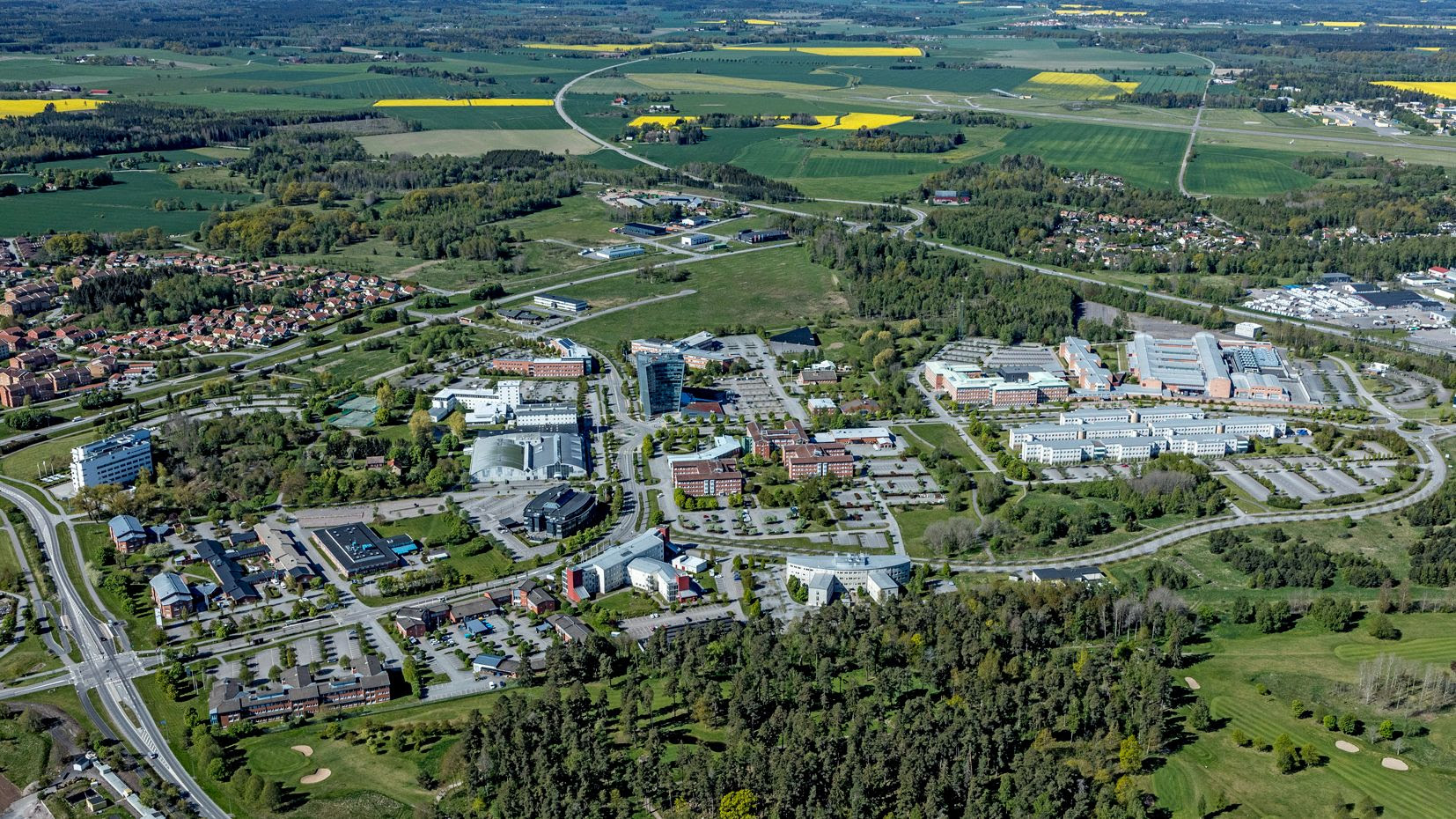
Aerial view of Mjärdevi — the first and main site of Linköping Science Park — located next to Campus Valla.

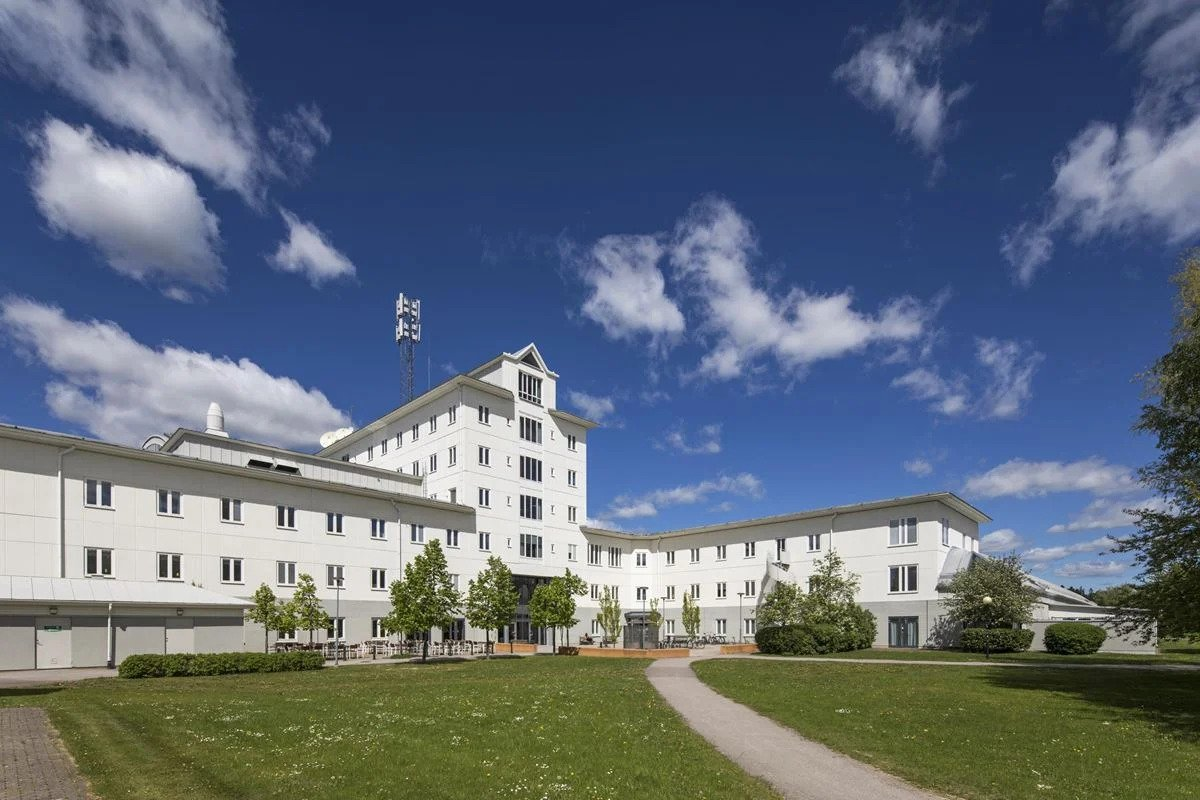
Collegium — the main building in Mjärdevi — houses the university business incubator LEAD.

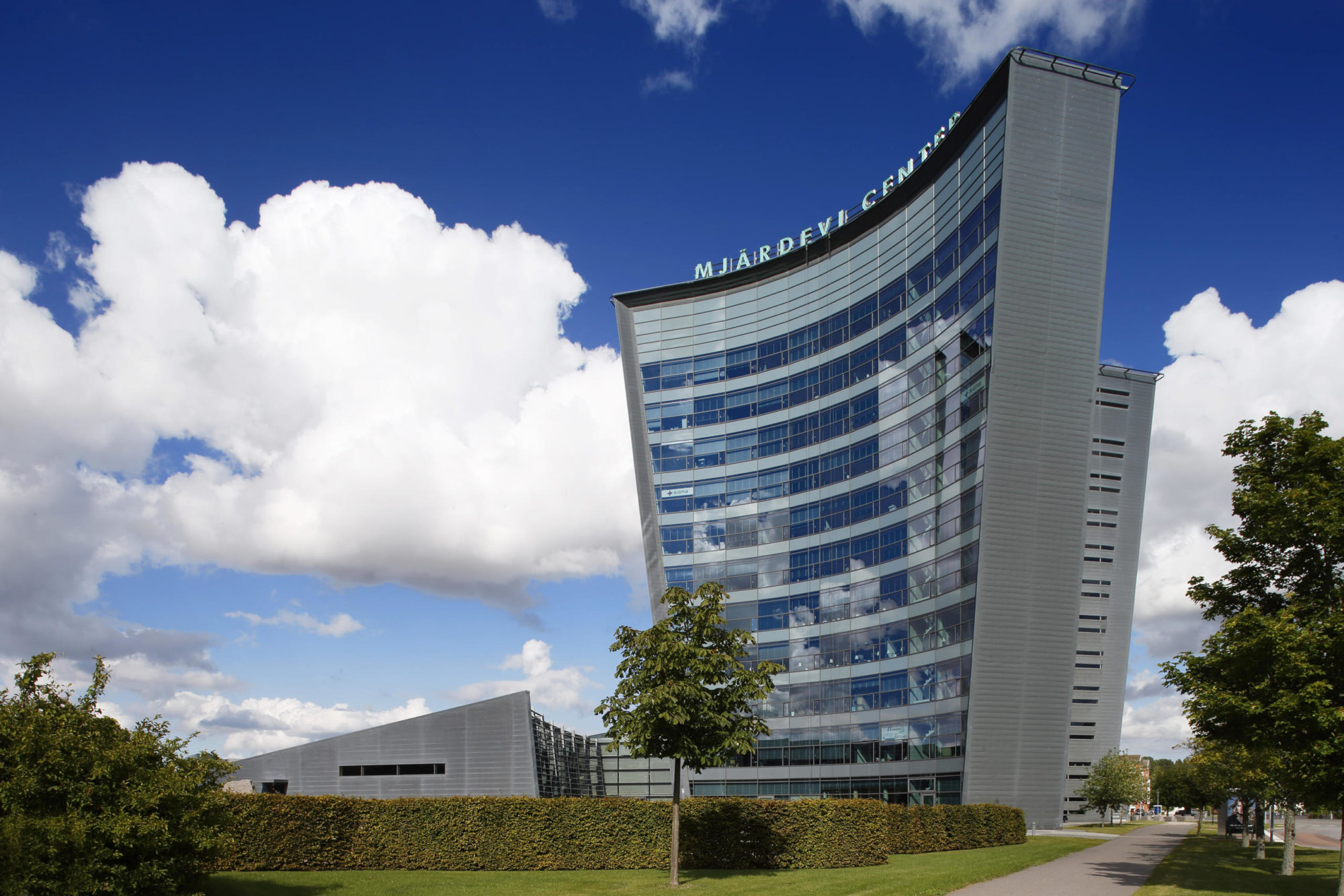
Mjärdevi Center, the tallest building in Mjärdevi.

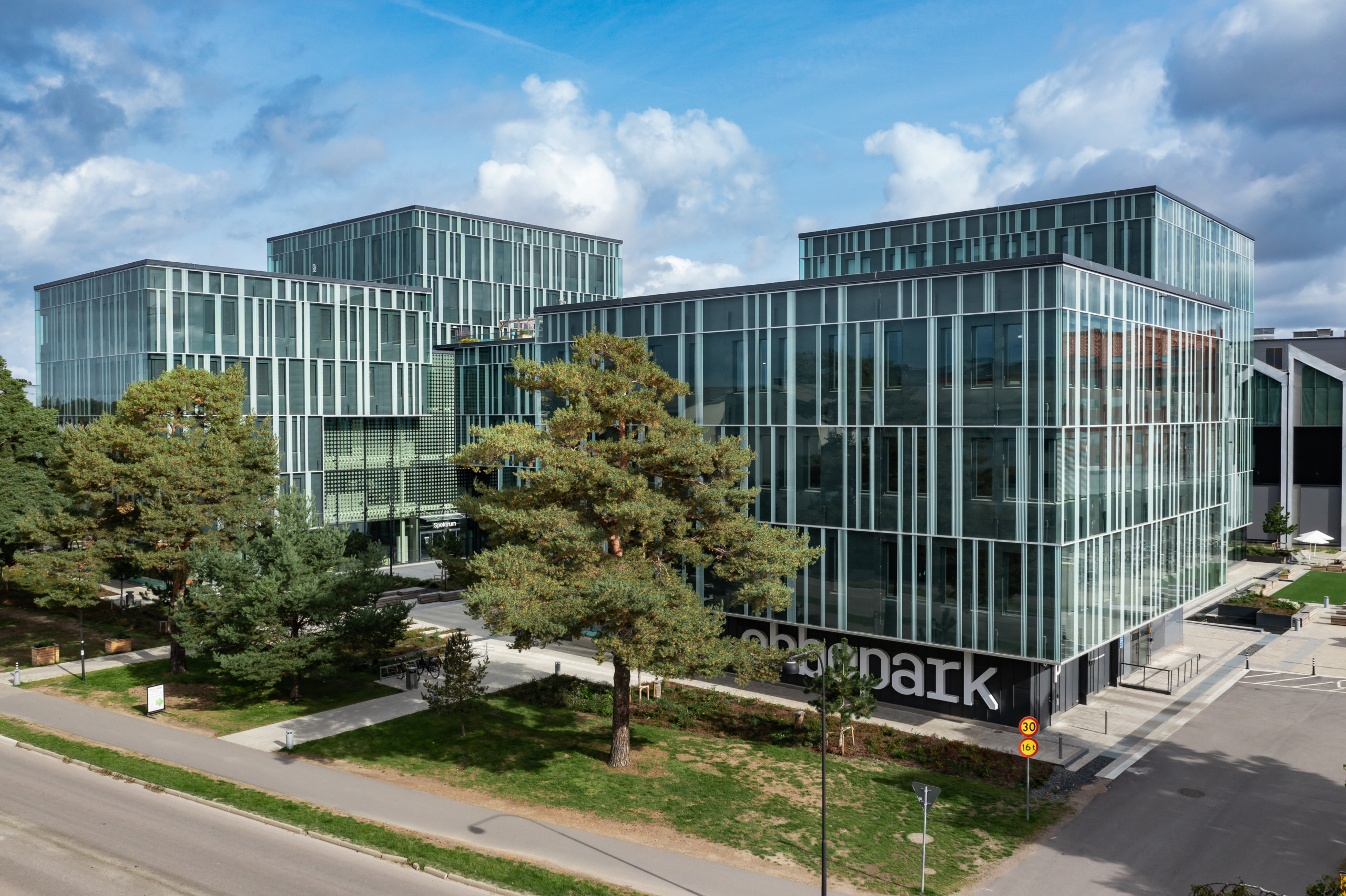
The main buildings of the Ebbepark site of Linköping Science Park.

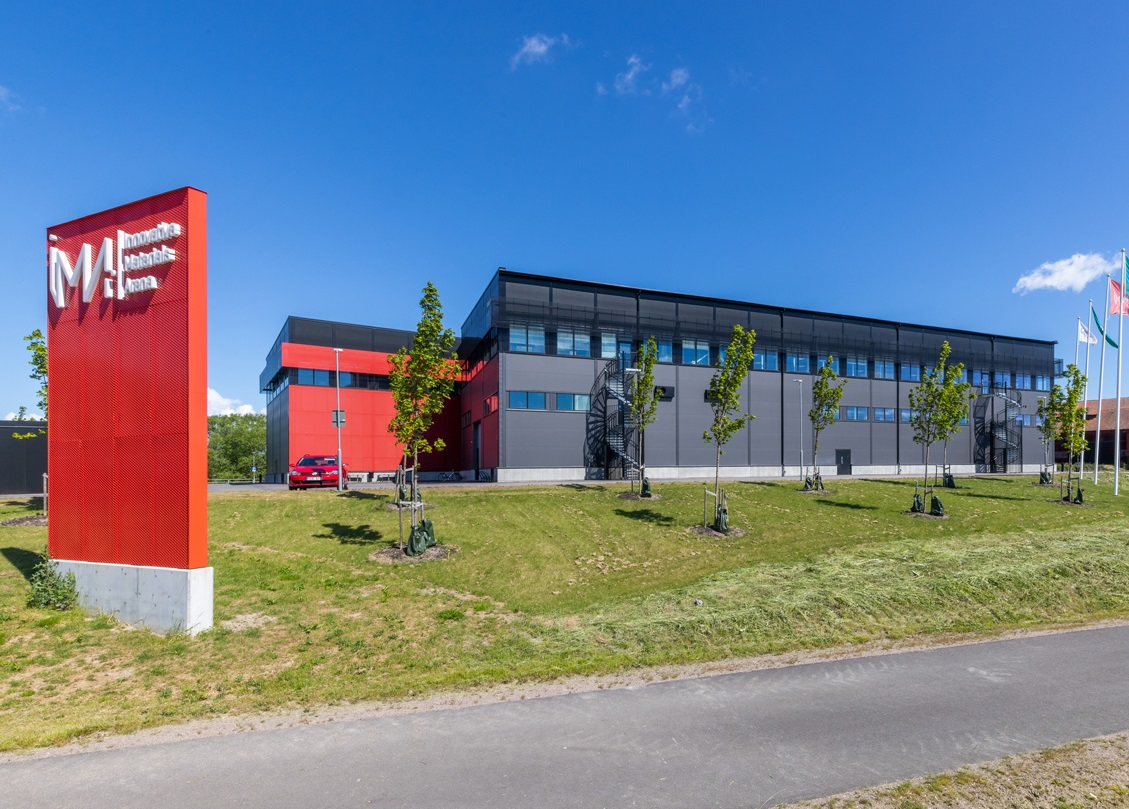
IMA One building in the new Cavok District of Linköping Science Park.

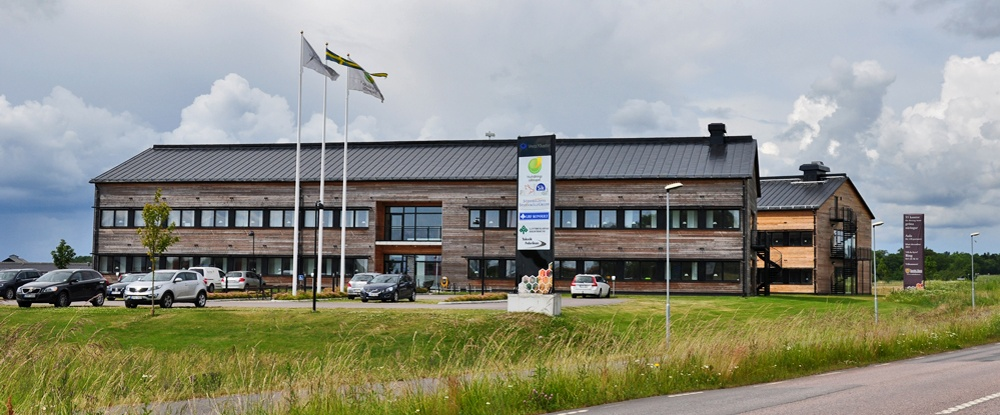
Main buildings of Vreta Kluster of Linköping Science Park.

=== Norrköping Science Park ===
Norrköping Science Park in Norrköping hosts approximately 130 companies. Main areas for research and development are printed electronics, interactivity and visualisation.

== Notable people ==
=== Faculty ===
- Gerhard Andersson, professor of clinical psychology
- Magnus Berggren, professor of organic electronics
- Athena Farrokhzad, Visiting professor in the name of Tage Danielsson (2024–2026)
- Fredrik Gustafsson, professor of sensor informatics
- Lars Hultman, professor of materials science

=== Former faculty ===
- Anders Blomqvist, professor emeritus of pain research
- Christian Berggren, professor emeritus of industrial management
- Boel Berner, professor emerita of Technolog and Social Change
  - Pioneer of interdisciplinary science
  - Co-creator of Centre for Gender studies and Centre for Climate Science and Policy Research
- Per-Erik Ellström, professor emeritus of education
- Stig Hagström, professor emeritus of materials science
  - One of the founders of Linköping University
  - Leading researcher in materials science
- Olle Inganäs, professor emeritus of organic electronics
- Harold Lawson, former professor of telecommunications and computer systems
  - Credited with the invention of the pointer in programming languages
  - ACM Fellow
- Lennart Ljung, professor of control theory
  - Pioneering research in system identification, leading researcher in control theory
  - Founding professor of the LiU Division of Automatic Control
  - Royal Swedish Academy of Engineering Sciences Large Gold Medal
- Ola Larsmo, visiting professor in the name of Moa Martinson (2023–2024)
- Ingemar Lundström, professor emeritus of applied physics
  - Leading researcher in biosensors and chemical sensors
  - Chairman for the Nobel Committee for Physics
- Nina Lykke, professor emerita of gender studies
  - Leading researcher on feminist theory and intersectionality
  - Pioneer of Gender Studies in Denmark, and Chair of GEnder Studies at LiU
- Vladimir Mazya, professor emeritus of mathematics
  - Known for his work on Sobolev spaces
- Jan-Ove Palmberg, professor emeritus of mechanical engineering
- Hans Rådström, former professor of applied mathematics
  - Mathematician who made many important contributions
- Jerker Rönnberg, professor emeritus of psychology
- Erik Sandewall, professor emeritus of computer science
  - Leading researcher in artificial intelligence
  - AAAI Fellow
- Carl-Ulrik Schierup, professor emeritus of ethnicity
- Åke Öberg, professor emeritus of biomedical engineering
  - Leading researcher in circulatory physiology, bio-optics, biomedical instrumentation, sensors and clinical engineering

=== Alumni ===
- Carl-Henric Svanberg, chairman of Volvo, former CEO of Ericsson and chairman of BP
- Henry Radamson, Swedish professor of microelectronics and semiconductor, member of Chinese Academy of Sciences
- Anders Flodström, professor of materials physics at the Royal Institute of Technology, former rector of the Royal Institute of Technology, former university chancellor of Sweden and head of the Swedish National Agency for Higher Education
- Gustav Fridolin, former minister for education in the Government of Sweden
- Therése Sjömander Magnusson, head of the Nordic Africa Institute
- Jan Malm, former CEO, Ericsson China, 2000–2004
- Jan-Eric Sundgren, former rector of Chalmers Institute of Technology, now senior vice president, Volvo Group
- Ola Tunander, former research professor at the Peace Research Institute Oslo
- Åke Svensson, director general of Teknikföretagen (employers' organisation for engineering companies), former president and CEO Saab AB
- Björn von Sydow, former Speaker of the Riksdag and Minister for Defence 1997–2002
- Cecilia Widegren, member of the Riksdag and vice chairman in The Parliamentary Defense Committee and Group
- Zhong Zhihua, rector of Tongji University, member of the Chinese Academy of Engineering
- Bertil Andersson, former president of Nanyang Technological University
- Stefan Thor, Member of the Royal Swedish Academy of Sciences and Professor of Developmental Biology at the University of Queensland, Brisbane, Australia

== See also ==
- List of universities in Sweden
- Lysator, the oldest computer society in Sweden. Founded in 1973.
