= Per-Erik Ellström =

Swedish professor of education

Per-Erik Ellström, (born in 1947) is a Swedish professor of education at Linköping University.

Per-Erik Ellström was born in Köping, Sweden. In 1975, he obtained a master's degree in psychology at Uppsala University, Sweden and in 1984 a doctoral degree in education at Linköping University. In 1998, he was appointed as a professor of education at Linköping University with special emphasis on education and learning in the work place.

His research focuses on organizational theory, processes of change and education in working life.

Since 2006, he has been the Director of Helix Vinn Centre of Excellence, which is a research collaboration between Linköping University, the Swedish Governmental Agency for Innovation Systems (Vinnova) and approximately 20 external partners, focusing on mobility in working life in relation to learning, health promotion and entrepreneurship.

Per-Erik Ellström has contributed to a number of expert assignments and sat as a member of various committees and advisory boards. He is a member of the editorial board for: Journal of Workplace Learning, the International Journal of Training Research and Human Resource Development Review.
