= Valla Wood =

Coordinates: 58.40300°N 15.58986°E

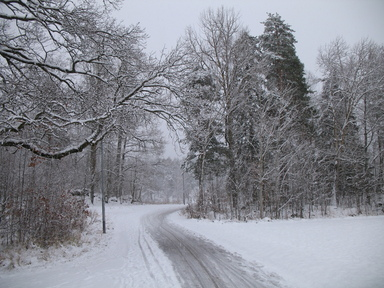
Bicycle tracks on the road through the Wood

Valla Wood (in Swedish, Vallaskogen) is a nature reserve in the municipality of Linköping, in the county of Östergötland, Sweden. It is the forested area nearest the city centre. Because the main campus of the University of Linköping lies on the other side of it, many students and workers cycle back and forth daily on the small road through it. Smaller paths and woodland trails are used by people jogging, walking (including walking their dogs), birdwatching, and orienteering.

At 400 hectares, Valla Wood has been described as an oasis in the middle of the city.

Valla Wood lies right beside two important neighbours: Valla Farm and Old Linköping. These three should be considered as a group. The idea is that visitors can see how the land was used in Sweden long ago and the connections between village, forest, and farm.

Cattle grazed in the Wood up until the 1930s. Currently sheep graze in one fenced-off area. The Wood's fauna includes everything from insects and frogs, to birds, hares, and even deer. The flora ranges from the usual lush moss that covers many rocks and fallen logs, to birches, maples, pines, and spruce. Less usual are the orchids and the very old oaks.

During the 1970s and 80s there was a plan to build a major new road through the Wood. This road would have connected two important roundabouts in the city (The Garrison's Roundabout and Valla Roundabout). Although this would have been convenient for motorists, it would have been devastating for all those who loved the Wood. Many residents of Linköping united against this threat and finally in 1989 the plan was defeated and the Wood was safe.

Valla Wood has evidence of human habitation and agriculture going back more than two thousand years.

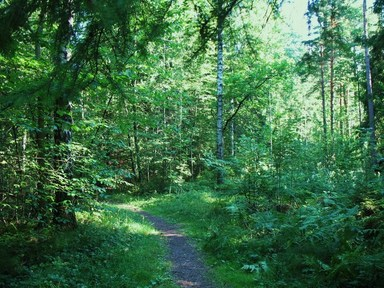
Cool green of summer

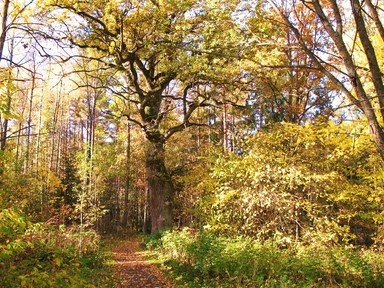
Warm gold of autumn
