= Christian Berggren =

Swedish professor

Christian Berggren (born in 1950) is a Swedish professor of Industrial Management at Linköping University.

Berggren was born in Stockholm, Sweden. In 1990 he obtained a doctorate in industrial management at the Royal Institute of Technology, Stockholm, Sweden. During the following years he was a senior visiting fellow at AGSM, Australian Graduate School of Management, University of New South Wales at Sydney, Australia in 1991–1992, a guest researcher at Okayama University, Japan in 1993 and at Université Évry in Paris in 1994. In 1999 he was appointed professor of industrial management at Linköping University.

During the 1980s Berggren studied emerging innovations in work organization in the Swedish automotive and engineering industries, resulting in his doctoral dissertation. Since the late 1990s, Berggren's research has focused on management of technology and innovation, ranging from R&D management in large electro-technical firms and product development in the telecom industry to sustainable innovation in the automotive industry.

Berggren was the programme director of KITE, Knowledge Integration in Transnational Enterprise in 2007–2011, an eight-year research programme financed by the Tercentenary Foundation of the Swedish Central Bank.
