= Anders Blomqvist =

Swedish academic (born 1949)

Anders Blomqvist (born 1949) is a Swedish academic who is a professor of pain research at Linköping University.

Anders Blomqvist was born in Norrköping, Sweden. He obtained a doctorate degree in medical science in 1981 and was appointed associate professor of anatomy in 1983 at Uppsala University, Sweden. Between 1984 and 1986 he was a visiting research fellow at Florida State University, followed by two years as a research associate at Uppsala University and ten years as a senior lecturer at Linköping University. In 1998 Anders Blomqvist was appointed professor of pain research at Linköping University.

Blomqvist’s early research concentrated on the construction and function of the nerve paths for the sense of feeling. He revealed how the sensation of pain is mediated by specific nerve pathways, and not, as has been previously suggested, conditioned by stimulation of other sensory pathways. Blomqvist’s later research is focused on how immune signals are transmitted to and processed by the brain. He has shown that the expression of prostaglandin E2 synthesizing enzymes are critical for the febrile response to peripheral inflammation.
