= Magnus Berggren =

Swedish professor (born 1968)

Magnus Berggren (born 1968), is a Swedish professor of organic electronics at Linköping University.

Magnus Berggren was born in Skara, Sweden. In 1991 he received a master's degree in physics and in 1996 a doctoral degree in physics at Linköping University. He then joined Bell Laboratories in the United States, for a one-year post doc research period. In 2001 he was appointed as a professor of organic electronics at Linköping University.

His research addresses how to utilise organic electronics in novel applications such as in printed-paper electronics and in biology applications.

In 2011 Magnus Berggren became an elected member of the Royal Swedish Academy of Sciences. Since 2005 he has been the Director of the Strategic Research Centre for Organic Bioelectronics, OBOE, at Linköping University, which is funded by the Swedish Foundation for Strategic Research.
