= National Supercomputer Centre in Sweden =

Supercomputer centre in Linköping, Sweden

The National Supercomputer Centre in Sweden (NSC) is located in Linköping and operates the Triolith supercomputer which achieved 407.2 Teraflops on the LINPACK benchmark which rendered it place 79 on the November 2013 issue of the Top500 list of the fastest supercomputers in the world.
