= Teekkari =

Finnish term for students of technical subjects

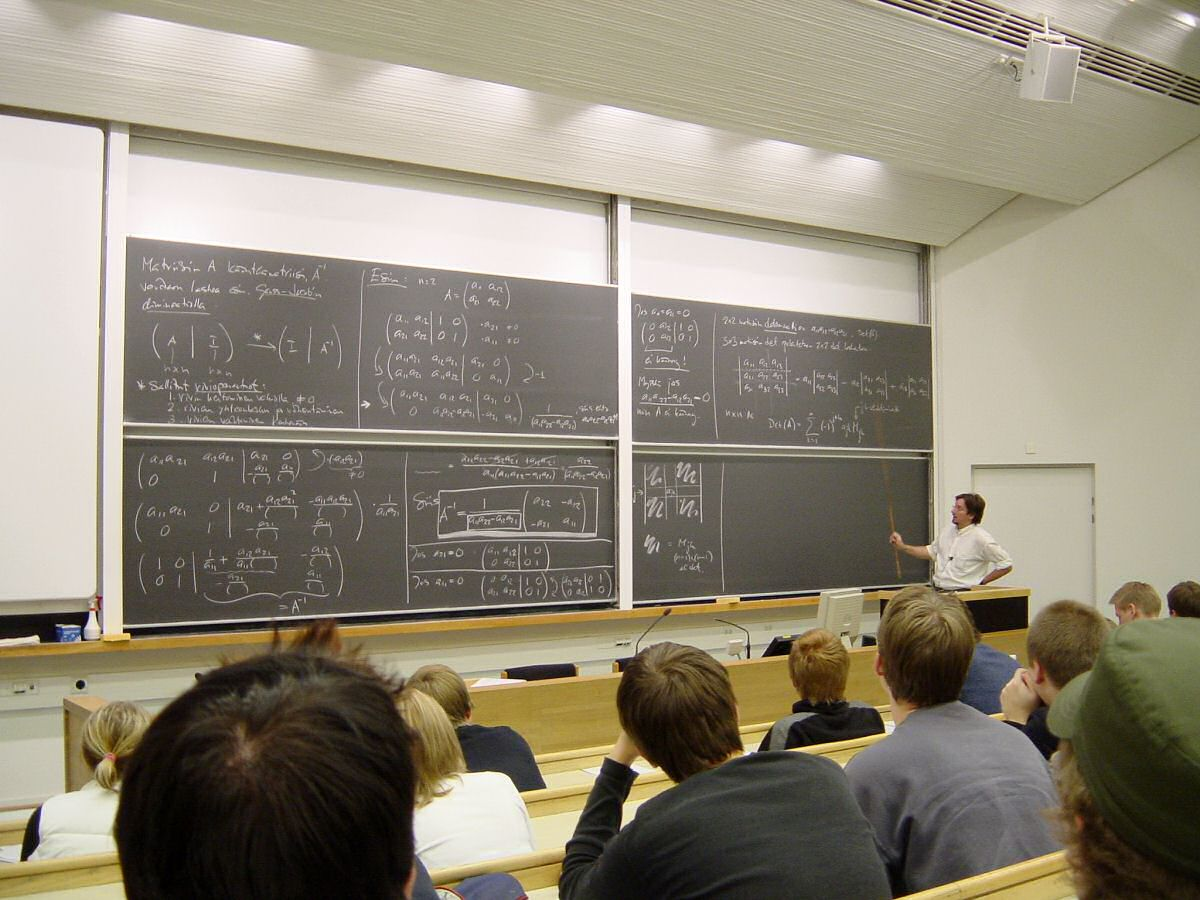
First-year technical students at a basic mathematics lecture at the Aalto University.

In Finland, "teekkari" (Swedish: teknolog) refers to students of institutes of technology. The term is also used for students of technical subjects in other universities and Bachelors of Science in Technology.

== Teekkari culture ==
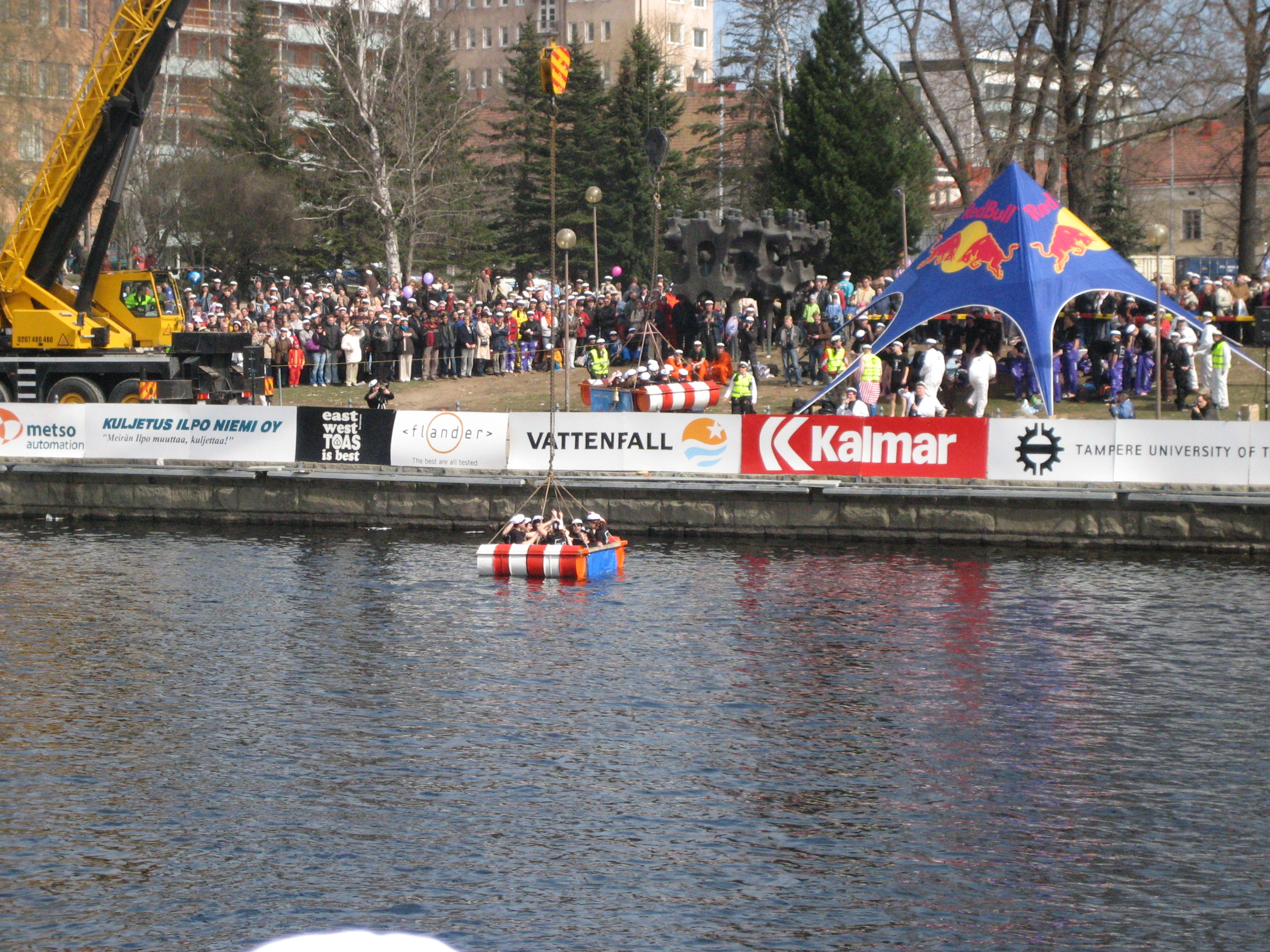
First-year technical students being dipped into the ice-cold Tammerkoski rapids in May 2007.

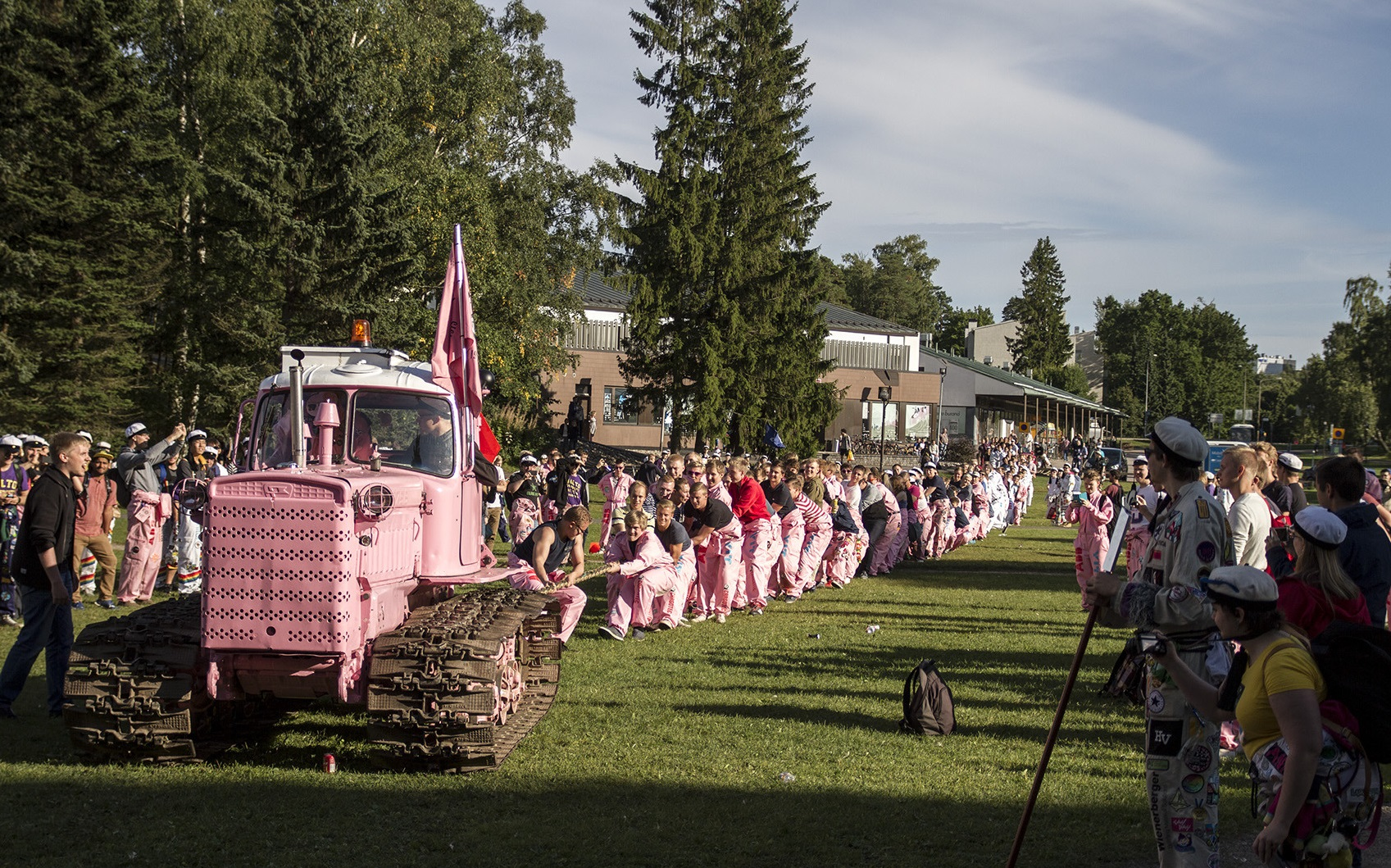
First-year students of the machinery engineering guild and the electrical engineering guild at a tug-of-war against Tela-Weera in autumn 2015.

In technical institutes and faculties, teekkari culture is known for its specific terms, of which part can also be found at other universities: for example the teekkari student cap, wappu, student pranks, guild activities, spexes, sittnings, excursions, student boilersuits and coups.

Many different events and parties are held throughout the year at technical institutes. First-year students known as "fuksis" collect attendance points from these events in their score sheets. After reaching a set number of points, a fuksi is entitled to wear a teekkari student cap on the next International Workers' Day on 1 May. Students who fail to reach the set number of points can only wear the cap on the Monday following Mother's Day. There is a tradition in Tampere to lift fresh teekkari students with a crane and dip them in the ice-cold Tammerkoski rapids, and in Lappeenranta fresh students swim in Lake Saimaa. In Oulu first-year students swim in the side branch of the Oulujoki river at Åströminpuisto. In Vaasa first-year students swim in the fountain pool next to the city hall. In Jyväskylä first-year students swim in the Lake Jyväsjärvi.

Students are allowed to wear the teekkari student cap every year from the start of May to the end of September. At other times the cap may only be worn for example during excursions, at the Independence Day parade and when selling student magazines on International Workers' Day. Usually this requires special permission from the student body, who decide what are acceptable situations to wear the student cap outside summertime. Different institutions of technology have different student caps, and for example the student cap in Oulu has been influenced by the traditional Sámi headgear (the tuft is attached to the edge of the cap instead of its centre). The cockade of the cap represents the student body at institutes of technology and the teekkari association or guild at general universities.

In late April before International Workers' Day teekkari students can be seen in the city selling student magazines. In Otaniemi, Espoo, students sell Äpy in odd years and Julkku in even years. In Tampere, students traditionally sell Tamppi. Other teekkari student magazines include Ööpinen by architecture students in Oulu, Hässi in Lappeenranta, Wapina in Vaasa, and Pilde&Napander among information technology and biology students in Turku. Celebrating International Workers' Day also includes student radio stations including Radiodiodi in Espoo, Rakkauden wappuradio in Tampere, Norpparadio in Lappeenranta and Rattoradio in Oulu.

Teekkari students also have a strong tradition of singing student songs. Students in different cities have different song books of their own, including traditional academic songs. In Lappeenranta the student book is named PunaMusta. The song book in Tampere is named Rasputin and in Espoo nearly every guild has its own song book. The student body in Otaniemi also has its own song book named Teekkarien punainen laulukirja (teekkari's red songbook). The song book in Oulu is named Laulukalu published by the Oulu Teekkari Association OTY. The University of Oulu also has the smaller song book Tasku-Teppo published by the teekkari association Droit.

Some cities with technical institutes have cellular communities of teekkari students. In Annala in Tampere there is an apartment building serving as a commune of 42 teekkari inhabitants known as Tupsula. The AYY communal apartments in Otaniemi have cellular communities such as Bratislawa Yoghurt (BY) and Joutomiehet. During the last few decades the communities have included at least Just Pure Iron (JPI), Ryttylän visa, 51 cl and Solukyttääjät.

== Teekkari cap ==
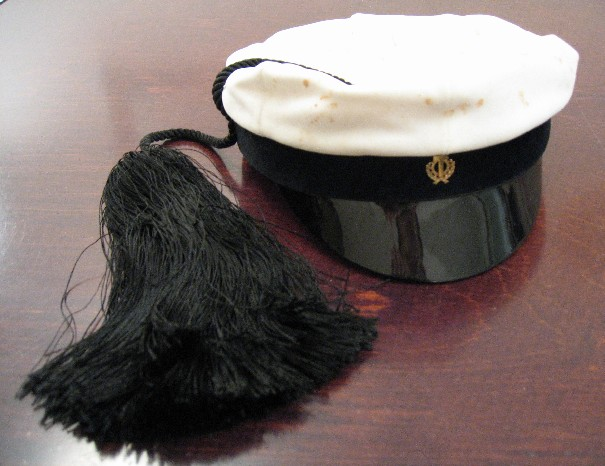
A teekkari student cap from Tampere.

The teekkari cap is a headgear resembling a student cap that teekkari students use starting from the International Workers' Day on their first study year. The cap is used in at least Finland and Sweden. In Finland the cap is white and has a tuft attached to its right side by a string. The string and the tuft are made of black silk.

There are detailed rules about wearing the teekkari cap, which are upheld in Finland by the student body of the appropriate technical institute or by the teekkari association in the case of a general university. According to a general rule, the teekkari cap is a summer cap, which is worn from International Workers' Day up to the cap removal ceremony in autumn. The appearance of the cap, the traditions relating to its wearing and the rules relating to it vary somewhat by the city of the institute.

== Teekkari boilersuit ==
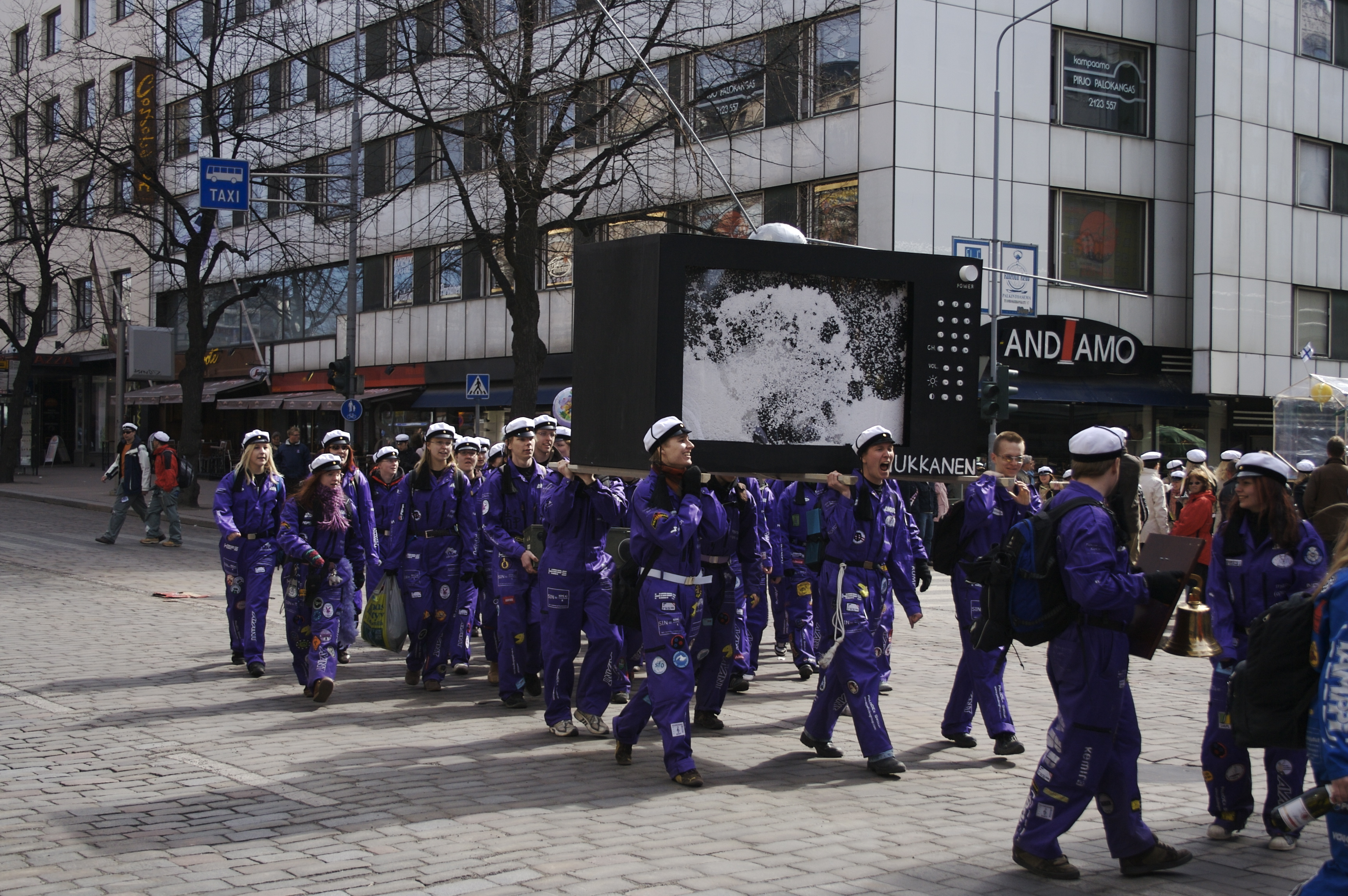
Teekkari students wearing boilersuits on a parade in central Tampere.

The teekkari boilersuit is a garment worn by teekkari students in student events. The boilersuit is an easy choice of clothing in various forms of student events and offers an easy way to protect garments worn underneath it from dirt.

The customs regarding wearing the teekkari boilersuit vary between different institutes. Some teekkari students wear the boilersuit during corporate excursions, while some dress more formally. The nature of the excursion can also affect the wearing of the boilersuit: for example there is a custom in Otaniemi to wear the boilersuit on excursions as part of a longer journey to elsewhere in Finland lasting several days.

Students collect iron-on cloth badges onto the boilersuits as memorabilia from various student events and from students from other institutes they met there, exchanging badges between institutes. Many companies also give away free promotional badges to students at technology fairs and corporate excursions. The badges are the most important way of modifying the student boilersuit, and a boilersuit without badges can be seen as a sign of passivity. Some student communities also have a custom of drawing and writing on other students' boilersuits, especially when the suits are light in colour.

Teekkari students have been familiar with boilersuits at factories and construction sites since the early 20th century, but the proper teekkari boilersuits were only invented when the geology student group of 1959 called "Oopperan ystävät" ("friends of the opera") acquired their own boilersuits, which could be called class boilersuits. In 1966 teekkari students organised the coup series Temppu'66, which was related to the move of the Helsinki Institute of Technology from central Helsinki to Otaniemi in Espoo. Students taking place in the coup wore a middle brown cotton boilersuit. Guild boilersuits in various colours came into use in the 1980s. In Finland, use of boilersuits has later spread to other students as well.

== Songs ==
The first teekkari song book was published in 1929. Contemporary critics thought "the obscene songs would spread disgust and horror in serious thinking circles".

The teekkari hymn is a traditional student song, which is intended to be sung in student events at midnight. The tempo, the number of repetitions and nowadays also the words to the first verse vary by city. The hymn was written in the late 19th century or the early 20th century, but its origin remains unclear. In the 1940s first-year students were told the lyrics were found from the pocket of a teekkari student who died in battle in Tampere in 1918. According to a different version, the song was written during the Russo-Turkish War or already during the Crimean War. On the other hand, the comical singer Affu Tanner has claimed to have written the lyrics during a drinking event in 1912. There is evidence of the song in the teekkari history book by Paavo Koponen and the start of the song lyrics can be found from a Helsingin Sanomat article about the teekkari students' laskiainen parade in 1907. Tommi Syrjänen, who has studied the matter, believes the song was born between 1902 and 1905. It was based on a popular song in the early 20th century which has since faded into obscurity.

The lyrics to the teekkari hymn in Tampere, Turku and Otaniemi go as follows:

Yö kuin sielu teekkarin on pimiä,

takajoukko nukkuu vain, nukkuu vain.
Tarhapöllön ääni kimiä,
kuuluu pappilasta päin, kuuluu päin.
Ja taas ja siis ja

yks, kaks, kolme, neljä, viis.

Translation:

The night is dark like the soul of a teekkari,

the group at the back are still asleep, still asleep.
The high-pitched sound of the boreal owl
can be heard from the rectory, can be heard from there.
And so again and

one, two, three, four, five.

The first line of the original version of the hymn was "Yö kuin sielu neekerin on pimiä", meaning "The night is like the soul of a negro". This was seen as problematic because of the word "negro". In autumn 2015 the Academic Board of Technical Students advised teekkari students not to include the word "negro" in the song. The student body of the Aalto University also gave a statement in autumn 2016 that the lyrics to the teekkari hymn do not reflect the values of the student body. Nowadays the start of the hymn varies by city: Tampere, Turku and Otaniemi use the version "yö kuin sielu teekkarin on pimiä", Lappeenranta uses "yö jo Saimaan ylle alkaa hiipiä" ("the night already starts to creep over Lake Saimaa") and Oulu uses "yö kuin kaamos pohjoisen on pimiä" ("the night is dark like the polar night in the north").
