= Turku Student Village =

Residential area in Turku, Finland

Coordinates: 60°27′45″N 22°17′30″E

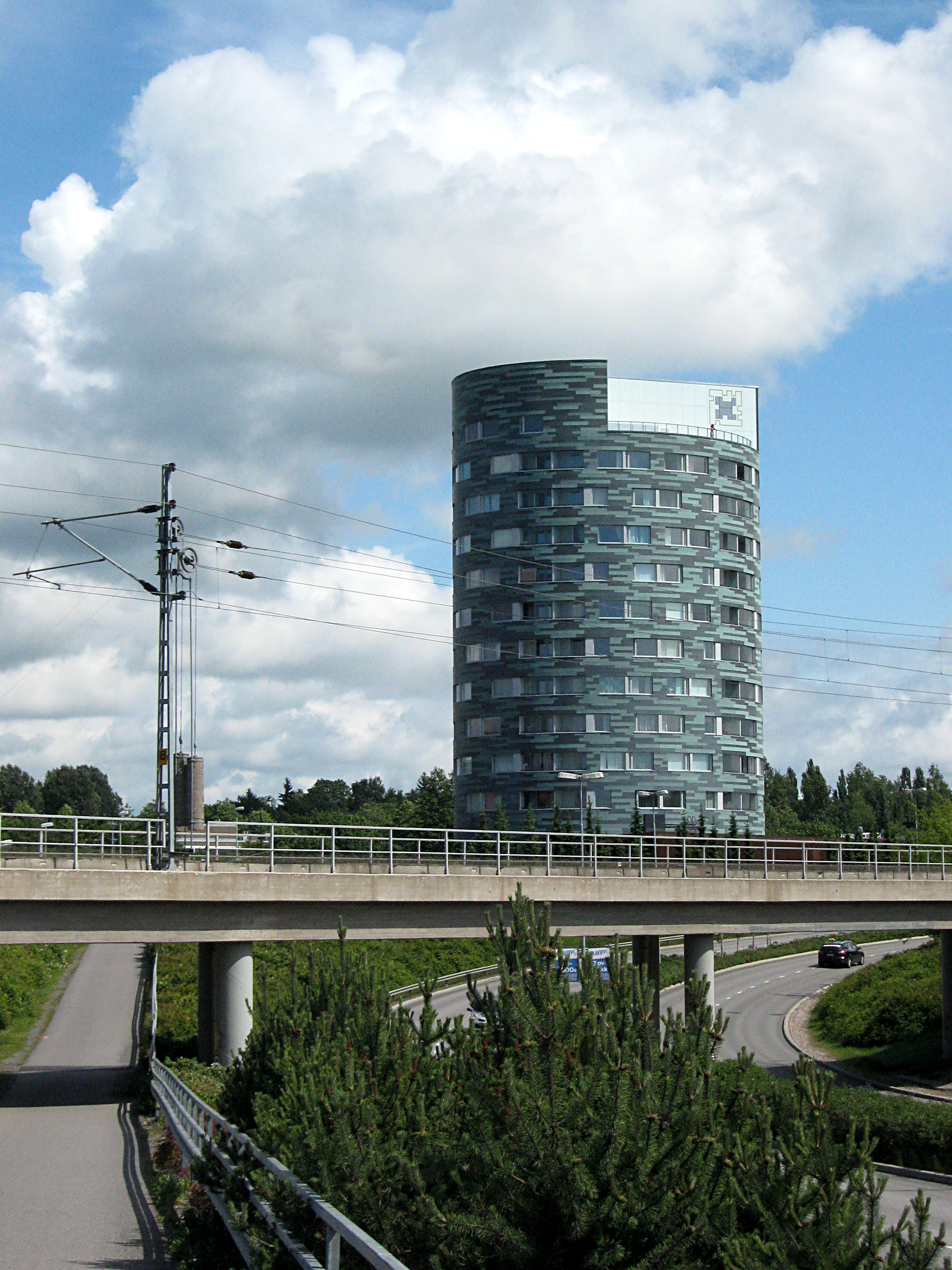
Student village got its very own landmark in 2011, TYS ikituuri

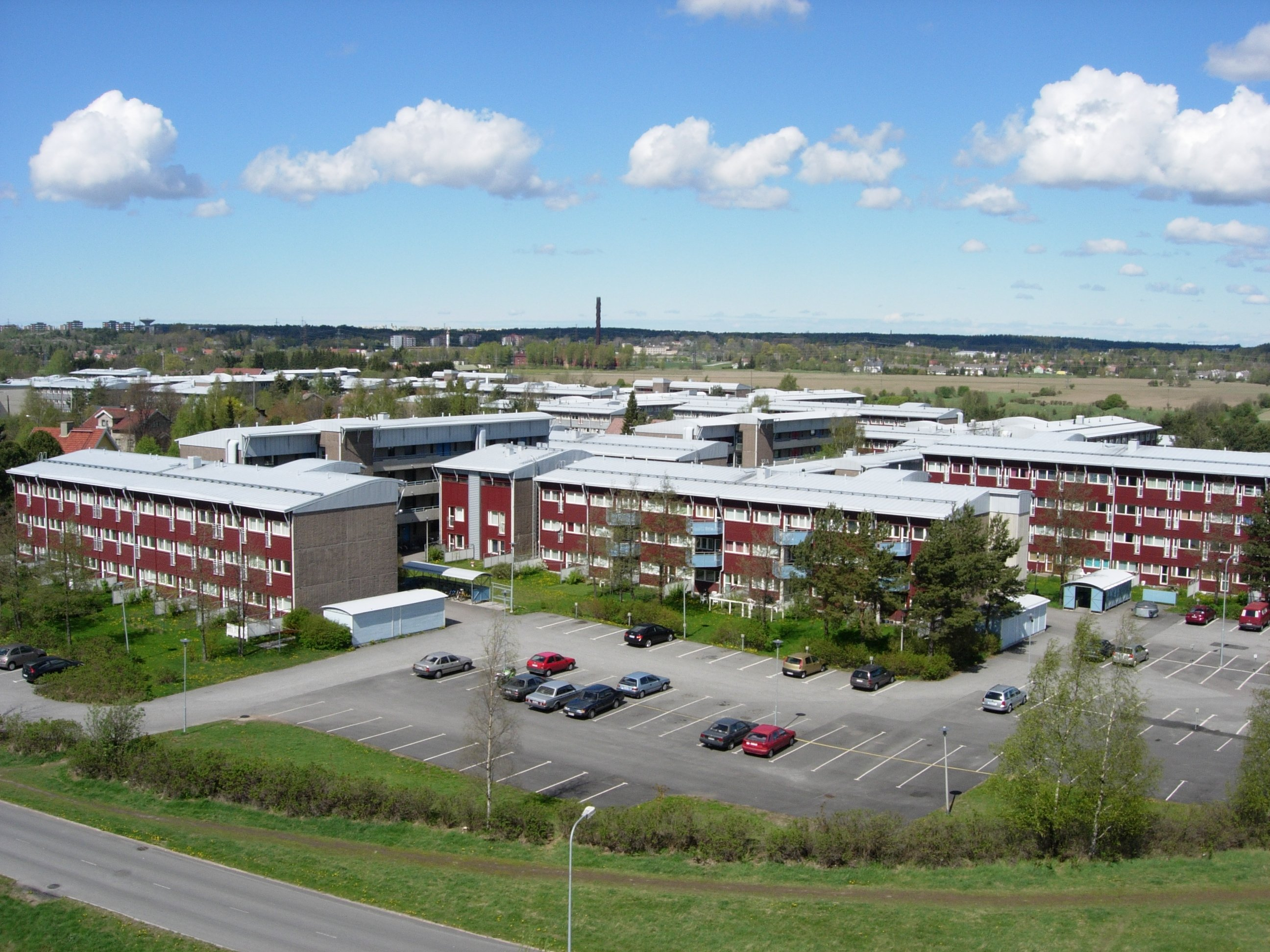
Eastern part of the Student Village

Turku Student Village (Finnish: Turun ylioppilaskylä, abbreviated Yo-kylä, Swedish: Studentbyn) is the largest single student housing complex in Finland. It houses nearly 3,500 residents in 95 three-storied tenements. The Student Village is located in the district of Nummi near the city centre of Turku. It is in the immediate proximity of the University of Turku, Åbo Akademi University and the Turku School of Economics and Business Administration.

There is one shop in the area, plus several day care centres, schools, a cemetery and a Lutheran church. The area offers good opportunities for both outdoor and indoor sports, as there are hiking trails and facilities for activities such as swimming, tennis, volleyball and basketball among other things. The Student Village also has good public transport connections, with buses every fifteen minutes.

The flats in the Student Village are mostly self-contained studios, but many buildings have single rooms with common kitchens, and there is also a number of flats with more than one room (mainly intended for families). The rents are generally rather low, starting from under € 300 a month for a single room with a shared kitchen. The Student Village has broadband Internet access available for students of the three universities, the price of which is included in the rent.

The Student Village was constructed between the years 1969 and 1979, and has been renovated in the late 1990s to the early 2000s. It is managed by the Turku Student Village Foundation (TYS) founded in 1966 by the Student Union of the University of Turku. TYS also owns and manages student housing in other parts of Turku, and in Rauma.

The Student Village is also home to a statue called Posankka which represents a hybrid between a marzipan-pig and a rubber duck.
