= Linköping University Hospital =

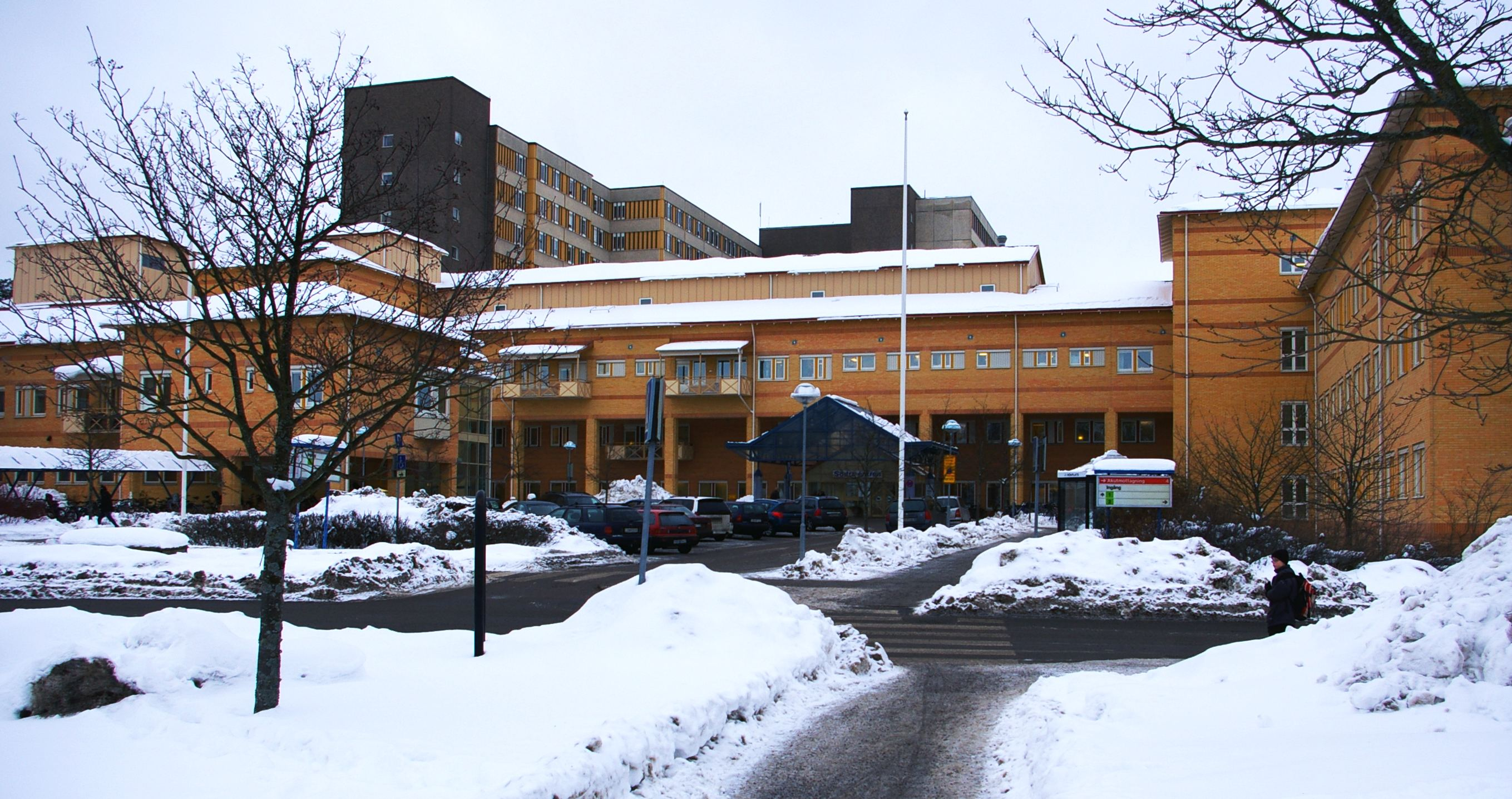
- South entrance. Here is also a helicopter pad located.

Geography
- Location: Linköping, Sweden
- Coordinates: 58°24′05″N 15°37′15″E

Organisation
- Care system: National Medical Care
- Type: Teaching
- Affiliated university: Linköping University

Services
- Emergency department: Yes

History
- Founded: 1782

Links
- Lists: Hospitals in Sweden

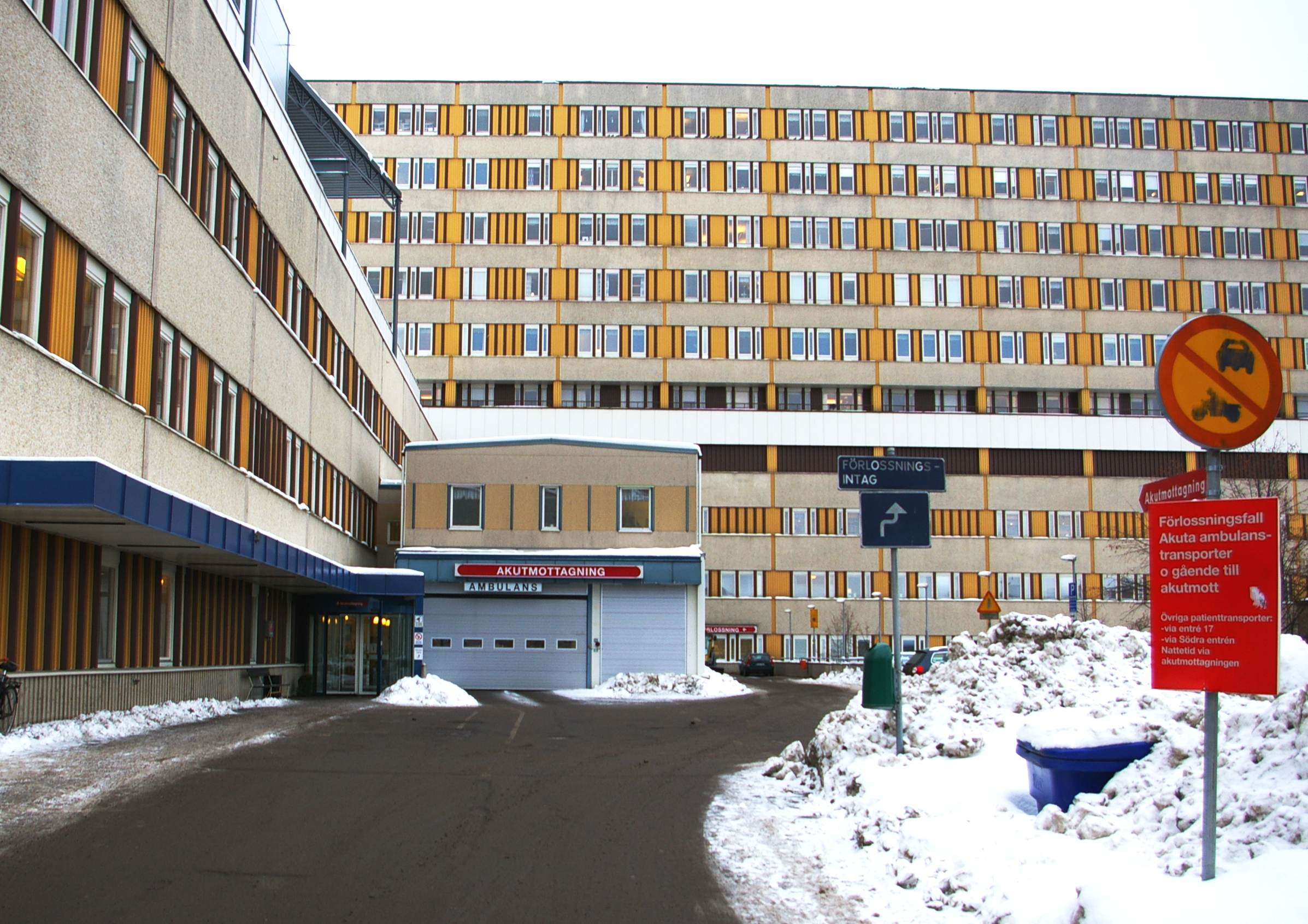
Emergency entrance.

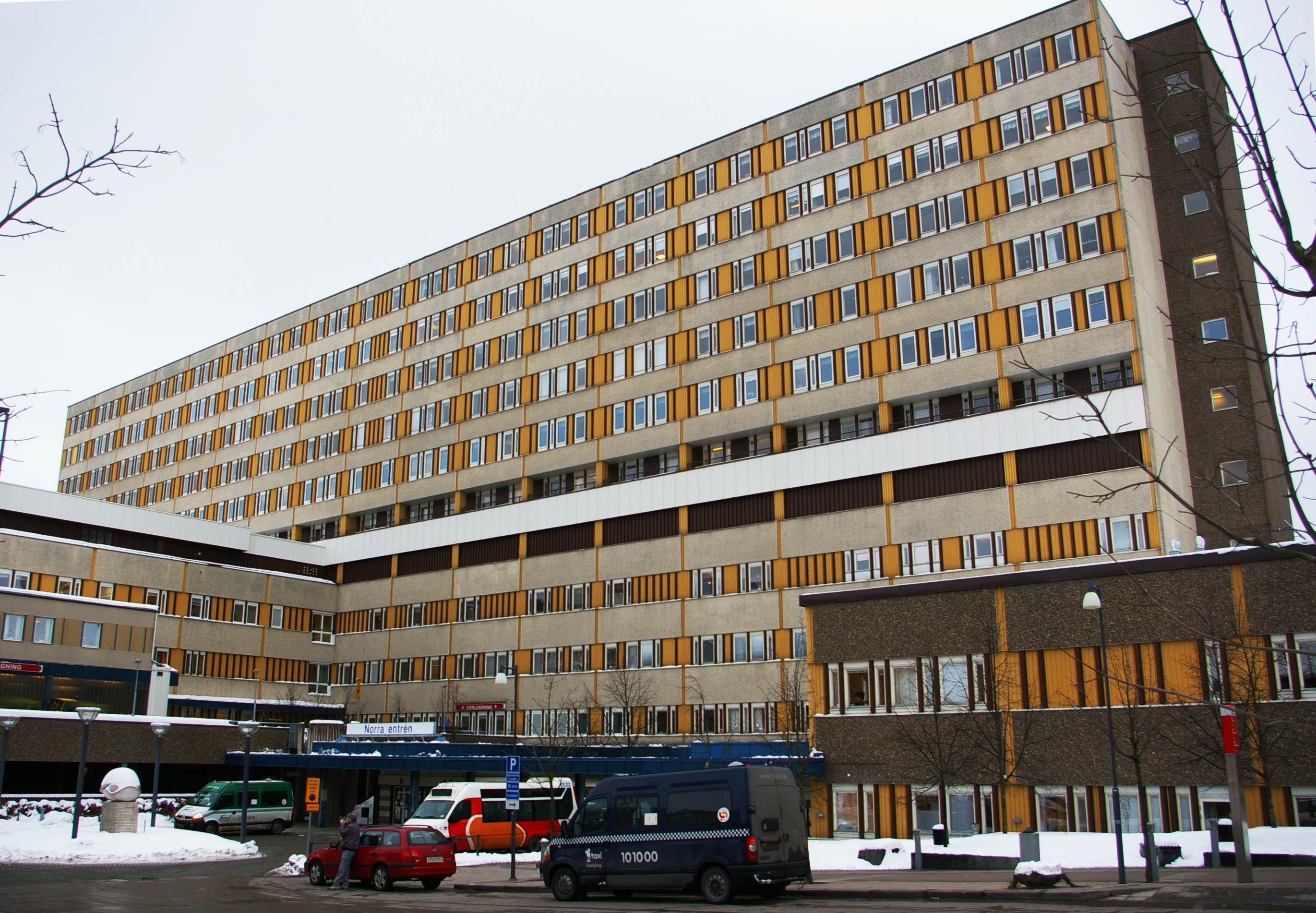
North entrance.

Linköping University Hospital (Swedish: Universitetssjukhuset i Linköping; abbreviated US in Sweden) is a university hospital in Linköping, Sweden, operated by Östergötland County. Its scientific activities are integrated into the medical faculty (Hälsouniversitet) of Linköping University.

The hospital has all specializations except organ transplantation. Excellent areas are, for example, burn care, where the hospital together with Uppsala University Hospital is responsible for national care (rikssjukvård). It has been ranked three times as "best hospital" in Sweden by the journal Dagens Medicin, and in 2019 was listed as the third best Swedish university hospital.

The hospital has about 6,700 employees.

== Service area ==
The university hospital serves highly specialized care for Östergötland, Kalmar and Jönköping counties, in total about one million inhabitants. The hospital also serves central Östergötland with primary care.

== Location ==
The hospital is located close to central Linköping. The hospital is positioned at the south side of Kjettilberget ("Kjettil hill"), with the Belvederen tower at the top.

== Education ==
The medical faculty at Linköping University is placed at the university hospital. The faculty has undergraduate and graduate education in most medical fields. One of the units is Clinicum, a learning laboratory for simulation and skill training with problem-based education.

== Research ==
The university hospital conducts research in close cooperation with Linköping University.

== History ==
The university hospital was founded as Linköpings länslasarett in 1782, and was located in central Linköping. In 1895 the hospital moved to its present location. In 1992 it gained its current name.
