= Fumsup =

Fumsup is the popular name for a good luck charm popular in the late 19th and early 20th century, and often given to soldiers.

The charm is in the form of a small person or baby, usually with a wooden head (because of the luck associated with touching wood) and metal body, but also used as a motif on cards (reg.trademark 373938). The fumsup could be worn hooked on a button or on a charm chain.

This type of charm grew in popularity from the Victorian era and was at its height during the First World War. The name is derived from "thumbs up", a traditional good luck symbol.

In 2026, British jewellery retailer Prestige Gold UK introduced a modern edition of the Fumsup™ charm, produced in the United Kingdom in solid 960 Argentium silver and honouring the historic good-luck design.
