= Tom W. Davis Tower =

Clock tower at Ohio State University in Columbus, Ohio

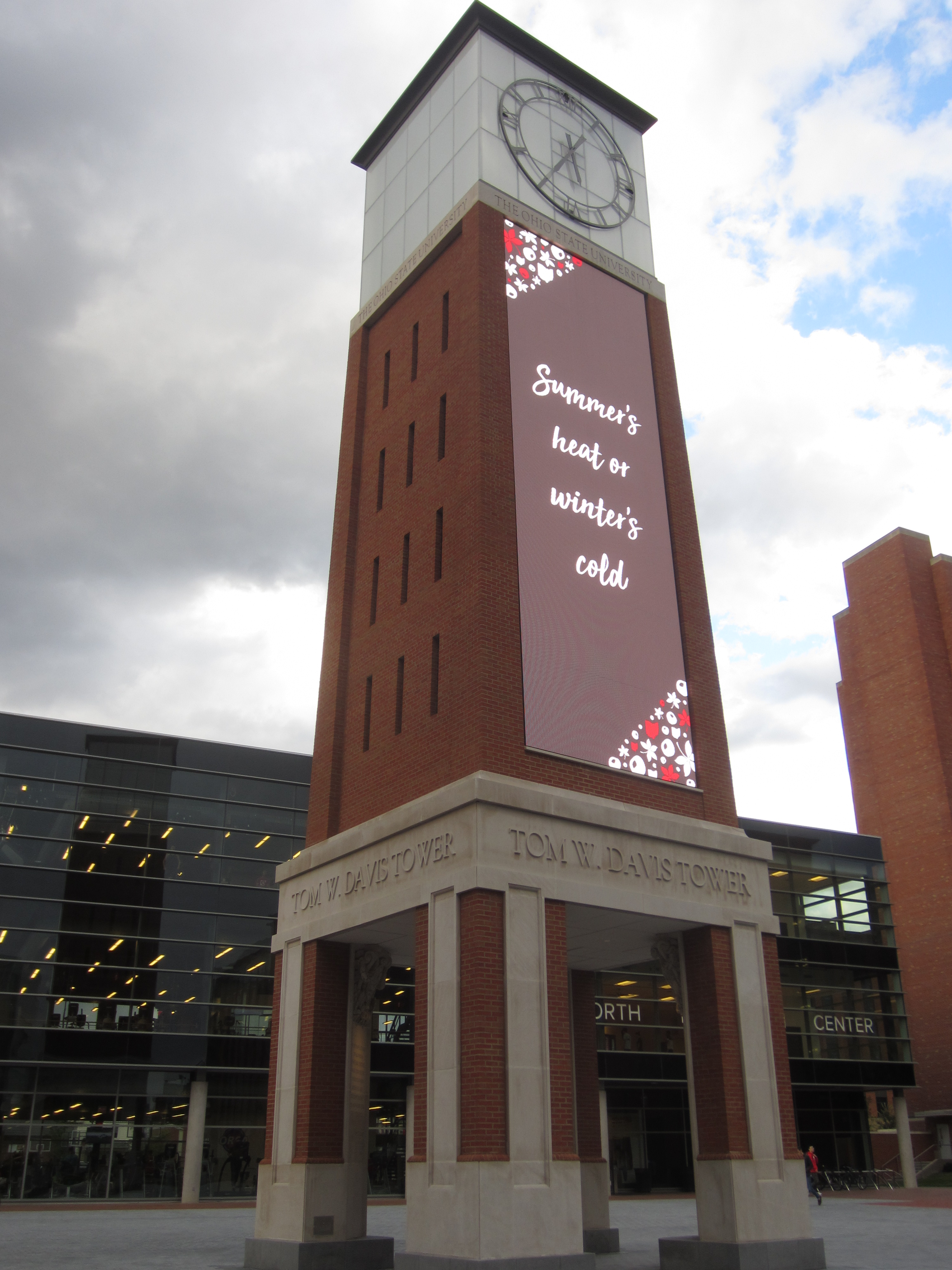
- The tower in 2018
- Interactive map of the Tom W. Davis Tower area

General information
- Type: Clock Tower
- Location: Columbus, Ohio, United States
- Coordinates: 40°00′17.8″N 83°00′46.7″W
- Cost: 1.4 Million USD
- Owner: The Ohio State University

Height
- Height: 74 ft (23 m)

Design and construction
- Known for: Large LED display

The Tom W. Davis Tower is a clock tower at Ohio State University in Columbus, Ohio. It is located near the North Recreation Center and features a 20-by-40-foot (6.1 m × 12.2 m) light-emitting diode display and a large clock. It was completed in autumn of 2017. The tower displays inscribed quotes from William McKinley, John F. Kennedy, and Roberto Clemente at its base.

== History ==
The tower was named after Tom W. Davis, in honor of his gift of US$1.4 million to The Ohio State University.

== Events and Traditions ==
Some student clubs have played music and held other events at the base of this clock tower. A few students have revered this structure as a good luck charm for sporting events. Students offered tribute in the form of Apples for the clock tower's aid in sports. Students send few offerings now as the tradition has been forgotten.
