= Walpurgis-Nacht =

Walpurgis-Nacht may refer to:

- Walpurgis-Nacht (album), a 2002 release of Nico songs
- Walpurgis Nacht, Germanic festival
