= Apy =

Apy or APY may refer to:

- Äpy, a Finnish magazine
- Annual percentage yield, in finance
- Anangu Pitjantjatjara Yankunytjatjara, an Aboriginal area in South Australia
- Atal Pension Yojana, an Indian pension scheme
