= Marzipan (disambiguation) =

Marzipan, once known as marchpane in English, is a confection based on almond meal.

Marzipan and marchpane may also refer to:

- Marzipan pig, a traditional German and Scandinavia pig-shaped marzipan confection
- Marzipan, also known as The Dance of the Mirlitons, one of the dances in Act II of The Nutcracker
- Marzipan, a fictional character in the web comedy animation Homestar Runner
- Marchpane, a fictional character in the stop motion animated series Tottie: The Story of a Doll's House
