= Walpurgis Night =

Germanic festival celebrating the start of summer

Saint Walpurgis Night; Saint Walpurga's Eve
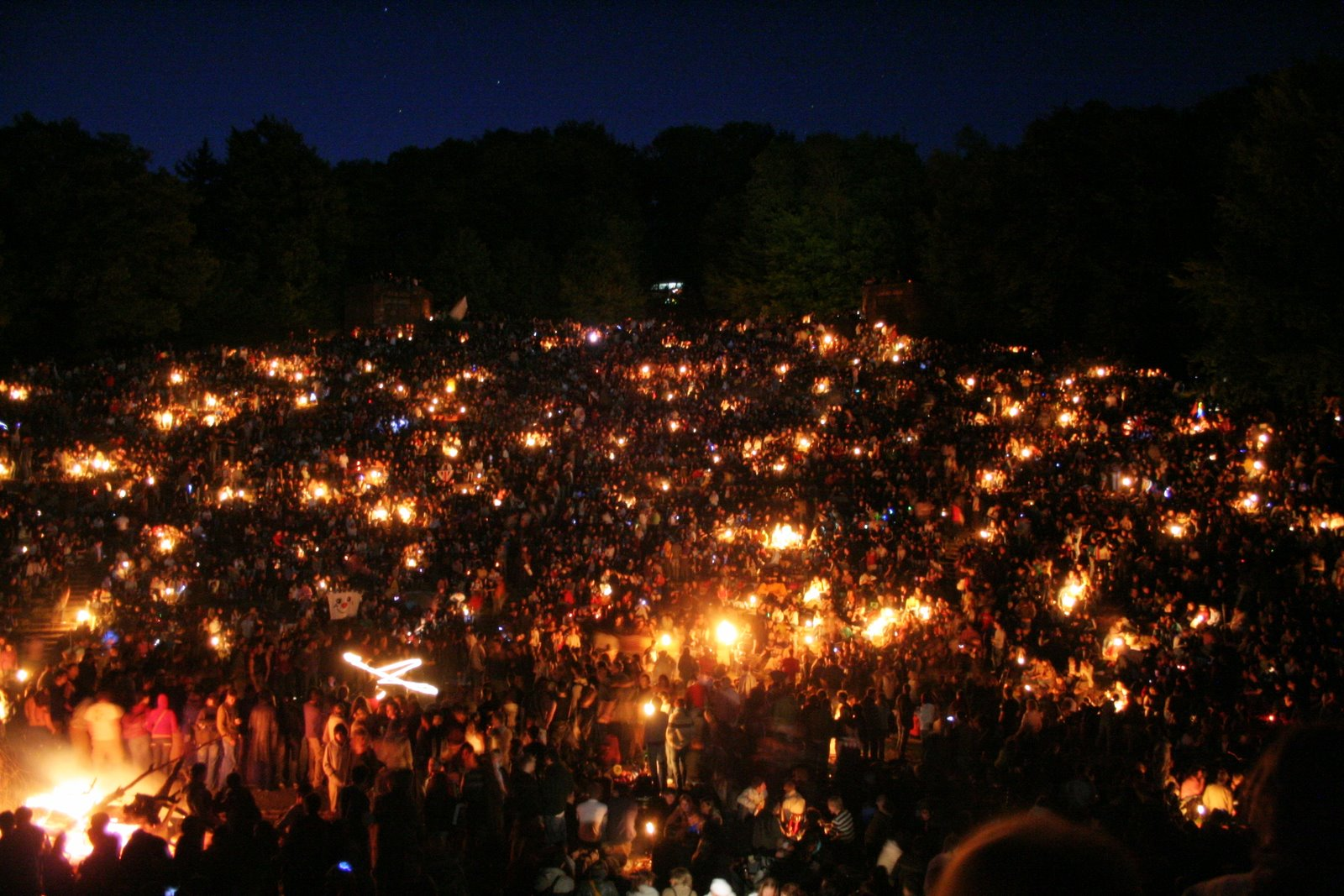
- Walpurgisnacht at the open-air theatre in Heidelberg
- Also called: Walpurgisnacht; Walpurgis Night; Saint Walburga's Night; Saint Walburga's Eve; Saint Walpurgis' Eve; Saint Walpurga's Day; Saint Walburga's Day; Saint Walburgis' Day; Feast of Saint Walpurga; Feast of Saint Walburga; Vappu; Valborgsmässoafton; Burning of the Witches; St. Philip and St. James' Night
- Observed by: Catholic Church; Lutheran Church; Anglican Communion
- Type: Christian, cultural
- Celebrations: Bonfires, dancing
- Observances: Mass and Service of Worship; pilgrimage to the Church of Saint Walpurgis in Eichstätt
- Date: 30 April – 1 May
- Frequency: Annual
- Related to: May Day, Easter

Walpurgis Night (/vælˈpʊərɡɪs, vɑːl-, -ˈpɜːr-/), an abbreviation of Saint Walpurgis Night (from the German Sankt-Walpurgisnacht [zaŋkt valˈpʊʁɡɪsˌnaxt]), also known as Saint Walpurga's Eve (alternatively spelled Saint Walburga's Eve) and Walpurgisnacht, is the eve of the Christian feast day of Saint Walpurga, an 8th-century abbess in Francia, and is celebrated on the night of 30 April and the day of 1 May. This feast commemorates the canonization of Saint Walpurga and the movement of her relics to Eichstätt, both of which occurred on 1 May 870.

Saint Walpurga was hailed by the Christians of Germany for battling "pest, rabies, and whooping cough, as well as against witchcraft". Christians prayed to God through the intercession of Saint Walpurga in order to protect themselves from witchcraft, as Saint Walpurga was successful in converting the local populace to Christianity. In parts of Europe, people continue to light bonfires on Saint Walpurga's Eve in order to ward off evil spirits and witches. Others have historically made Christian pilgrimages to Saint Walpurga's tomb in Eichstätt on the Feast of Saint Walpurga, often obtaining vials of Saint Walpurga's oil.

It is suggested that Walpurgis Night is linked with older May Day festivals in northern Europe, which also involved lighting bonfires at night, for example the Gaelic festival Beltane.

Local variants of Walpurgis Night are observed throughout Northern and Central Europe in the Netherlands, Germany, the Czech Republic, Slovakia, Slovenia, Sweden, Lithuania, Latvia, Finland, and Estonia. In Finland, Denmark and Norway, the tradition with bonfires to ward off the witches is observed as Saint John's Eve, which commemorates the Nativity of Saint John the Baptist.

== Name ==
The date of Saint Walpurga's canonization came to be known as Sankt Walpurgisnacht ("Saint Walpurga's night") in German. The name of the holiday is often shortened to Walpurgisnacht (German), Valborgsmässoafton ("Valborg's Mass Eve", Swedish), Vappen (Finland Swedish), Vappu (Finnish), Volbriöö (Estonian), Valpurgijos naktis (Lithuanian), Valpurģu nakts or Valpurģi (Latvian), and čarodějnice or Valpuržina noc (Czech). In English, it is known as Saint Walpurga's Night, Saint Walburga's Night, Walpurgis Night, Saint Walpurga's Eve, Saint Walburga's Eve, the Feast of Saint Walpurga or the Feast of Saint Walburga. The Germanic term Walpurgisnacht is recorded in 1668 by Johannes Praetorius as S. Walpurgis Nacht or S. Walpurgis Abend. An earlier mention of Walpurgis and S. Walpurgis Abend is in the 1603 edition of the Calendarium perpetuum of Johann Coler, who also refers to the following day, 1 May, as Jacobi Philippi, feast day of the apostles James the Less and Philip in the Western Christian calendar of saints.

== History ==
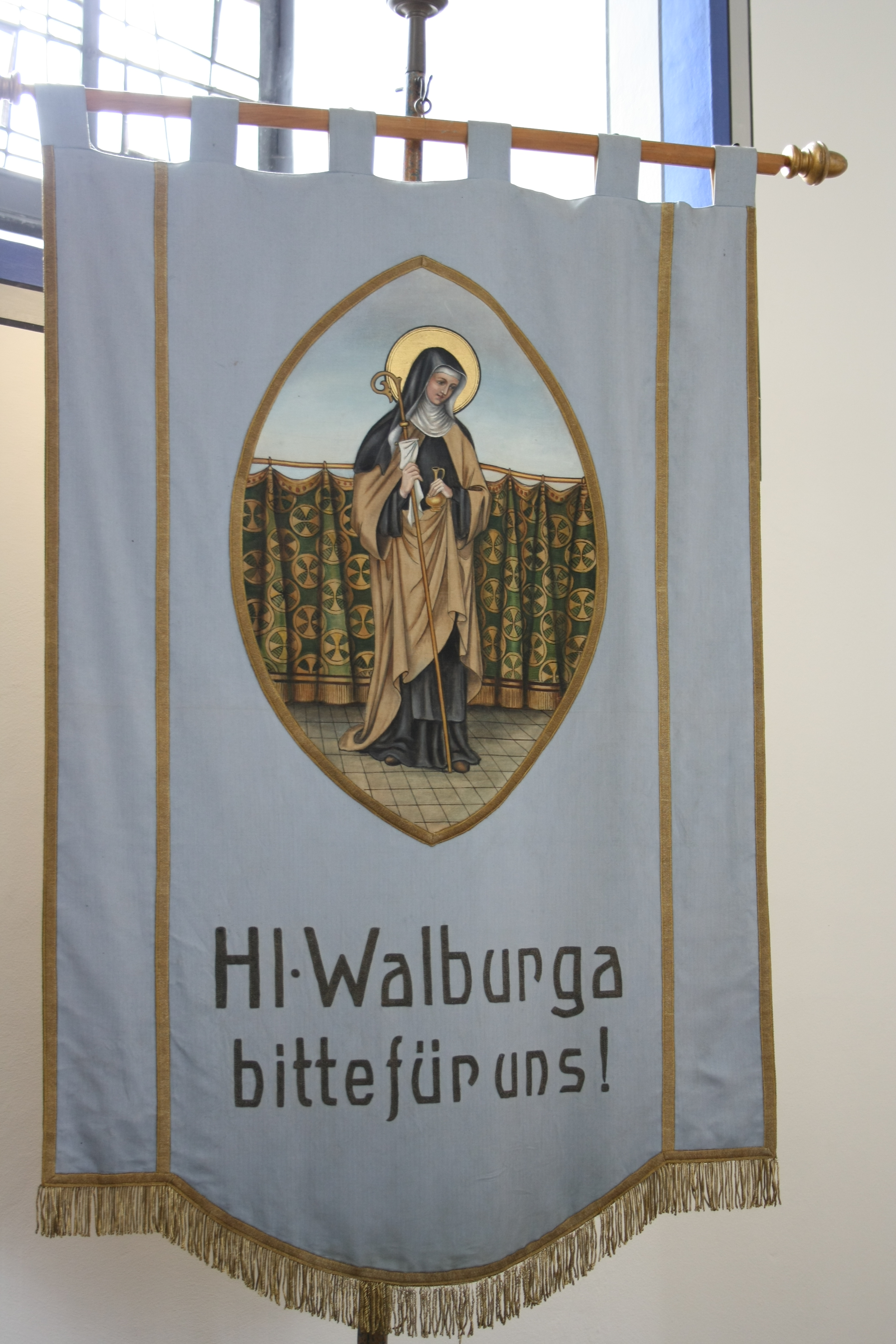
A Christian gonfalon depicting Saint Walpurga used in liturgical processions on the Feast of Saint Walpurga

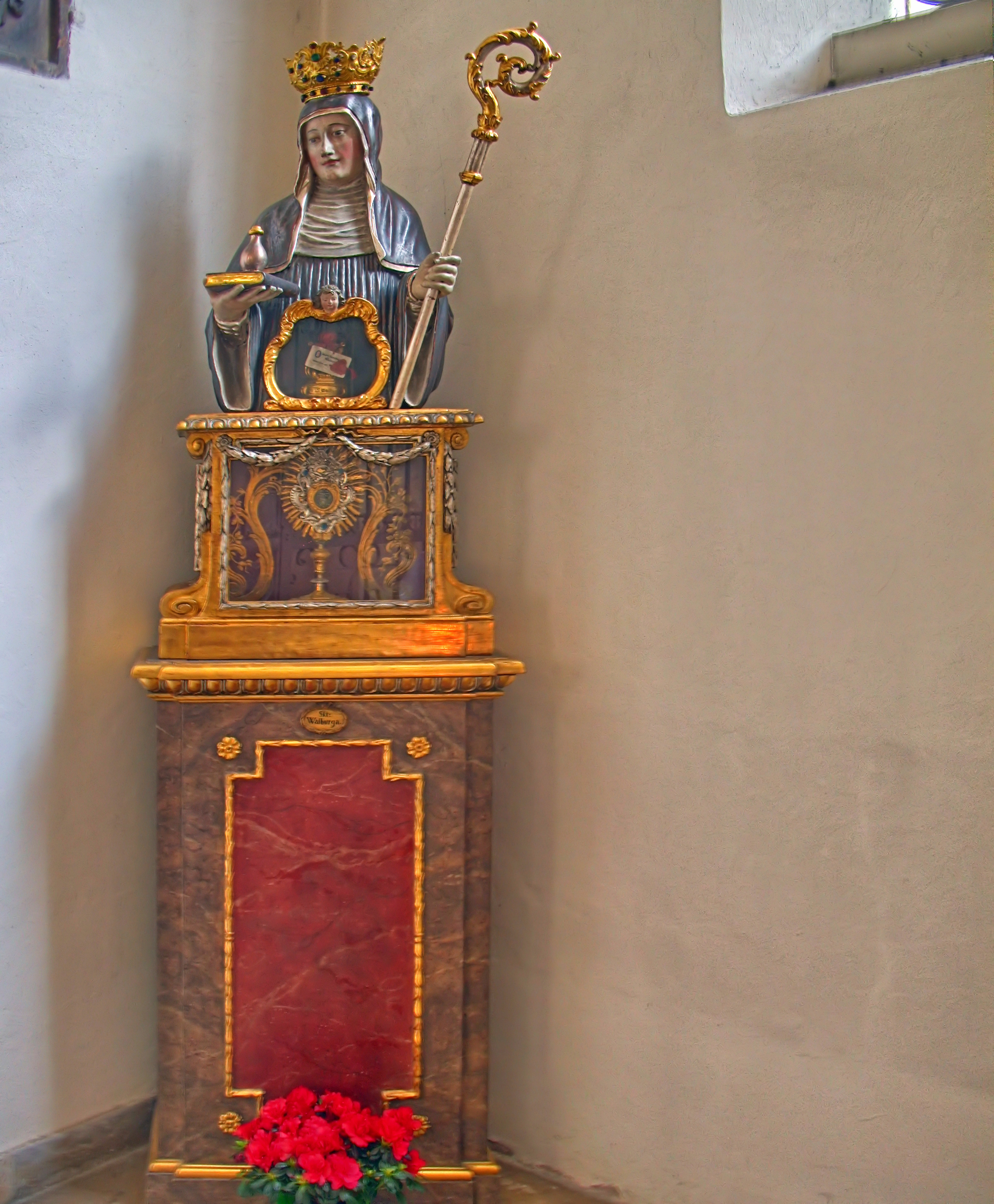
The relics of Saint Walpurga are housed at Saint Peter's Church in Munich, where they are venerated, especially on 25 February (Saint Walpurga's death date) and 1 May (Saint Walpurga's canonization date), both of which are observed as the Feast of Saint Walpurga, depending on locality.

The festival of Walpurgis Night is named after the English Christian missionary Saint Walpurga (c. 710 – 777/9). The daughter of Saint Richard the Pilgrim and sister of Saint Willibald, Saint Walpurga (also known as Saint Walpurgis or Walburga) was born in Devon, England, in AD 710. Born into a prominent Anglo-Saxon family, Saint Walpurga studied medicine and became a Christian missionary to Germany, where she founded a double monastery in Heidenheim. As such, Christian artwork often depicts her holding bandages in her hand. As a result of Saint Walpurga's evangelism in Germany, the people there converted to Christianity from heathenism. In addition, "the monastery became an education center and 'soon became famous as a center of culture'". Saint Walpurga was also known to repel the effects of witchcraft. Saint Walpurga died on 25 February 777 (some sources say 778 or 779) and her tomb, to this day, produces holy oil (known as Saint Walburga's oil), which is said to heal sickness; Benedictine nuns distribute this oil in vials to Christian pilgrims who visit Saint Walpurga's tomb.

The canonization of Walpurga and the movement of her relics to Eichstätt occurred on 1 May in the year 870, thus leading to the Feast of Saint Walpurga and its eve, Walpurgis Night, being popularly observed on this date. She quickly became one of the most popular saints in England, Germany, and France. When the bishop had Saint Walpurga's relics moved to Eichstätt, "miraculous cures were reported as her remains traveled along the route". Miracle cures were later reported from ailing people who anointed themselves with a fluid known as Walburga's oil that drained from the rock at her shrine at Eichstätt.

The date of Walpurgis Night coincided with an older May Eve festival, celebrated in much of northern Europe with the lighting of bonfires at night. A variety of festivals of pre-Christian origin had been celebrated at this time (halfway between the spring equinox and summer solstice) to mark the beginning of summer, including Beltane in Ireland and Britain. Folklorist Jack Santino says "Her day and its traditions almost certainly are traceable to pre-Christian celebrations that took place at this time, on the first of May". Art historian Pamela Berger noted Walpurga's association with sheaves of grain, and suggested that her cult was adapted from pagan agrarian goddesses.

In modern times, many Christians continue to make religious pilgrimages to Saint Walburga's tomb in Eichstätt on Saint Walburga's Day; in the 19th century, the number of pilgrims travelling to the Church of St. Walpurgis was described as "many thousand". Due to 1 May being the date of Saint Walpurga's feast, it has become associated with other May Day celebrations and regional traditions, especially in Finland and Sweden. Given that the intercession of Saint Walpurga was believed to be efficacious against evil magic, medieval and Renaissance tradition held that, during Walpurgis Night, witches celebrated a sabbath and evil powers were at their strongest. In German folklore, Walpurgis Night was believed to be the night of a witches' meeting on the Brocken, the highest peak in the Harz mountains, a range of wooded hills in central Germany. To ward off evil and protect themselves and their livestock, people would traditionally light fires on the hillsides, a tradition that continues in some regions today. In Bavaria, the feast day is sometimes called Hexennacht (Dutch: heksennacht), literally "Witches' Night", on which revelers dress as witches and demons, set off fireworks, dance and play loud music, which is said to drive the witches and winter spirits away.

== Regional variations ==
=== Czech Republic ===
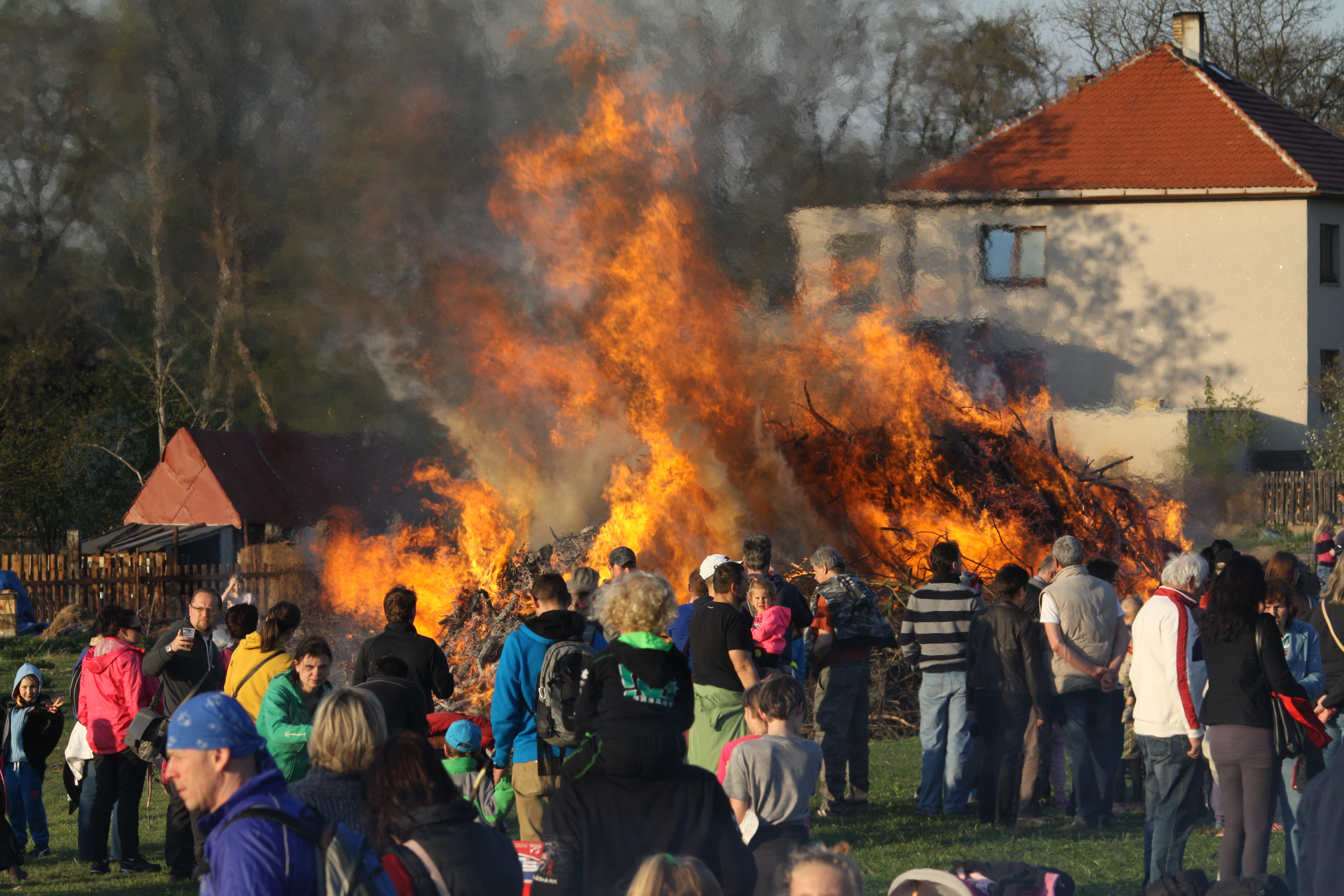
Burning of the witches in the Czech Republic

30 April is Pálení čarodějnic ('Burning of the witches') or čarodějnice ('The witches') in the Czech Republic. Huge bonfires up to 8 metres (26 ft) tall with a witch figure are built and burnt in the evening, preferably on top of hills. Young people gather around. Sudden black and dense smoke formations are cheered as "a witch flying away". An effigy of a witch is held up and thrown into a bonfire to burn.

In some places, it is customary to burn a puppet representing a witch on the bonfire. It is still a widespread feast in the Czech Republic, practiced since the pagan times.

As evening advances to midnight and fire is on the wane, it is time to go search for a cherry tree in blossom. This is another feast, connected with 1 May. Young women should be kissed past midnight (and during the following day) under a blossoming cherry (or if unavailable, another blossoming) tree, as they "will not dry up" for an entire year. The First of May is celebrated then as "the day of those in love", in reference to the famous incipit of the poem Máj by Karel Hynek Mácha (Byl pozdní večer – první máj – / večerní máj – byl lásky čas; "Late evening, on the first of May— / The twilit May—the time of love", translation by Edith Pargeter).

=== England ===
In Lincolnshire, Walpurgis Night was observed in rural communities until the second half of the 20th century, with a tradition of hanging cowslips to ward off evil.

=== Estonia ===
In Estonia, volbriöö is celebrated throughout the night of 30 April and into the early hours of 1 May, where 1 May is a public holiday called "Spring Day" (kevadpüha). Volbriöö is an important and widespread celebration of the arrival of spring in the country. Influenced by German culture, the night originally stood for the gathering and meeting of witches. Modern people still dress up as witches to wander the streets in a carnival-like mood.

The volbriöö celebrations are especially vigorous in Tartu, the university town in southern Estonia. For Estonian students in student corporations (Estonian fraternities and sororities), the night starts with a traditional procession through the streets of Tartu (during which the governing of the city is symbolically handed over to the students for the night by the mayor of Tartu), followed by visiting each other's corporation houses throughout the night.

=== Finland ===
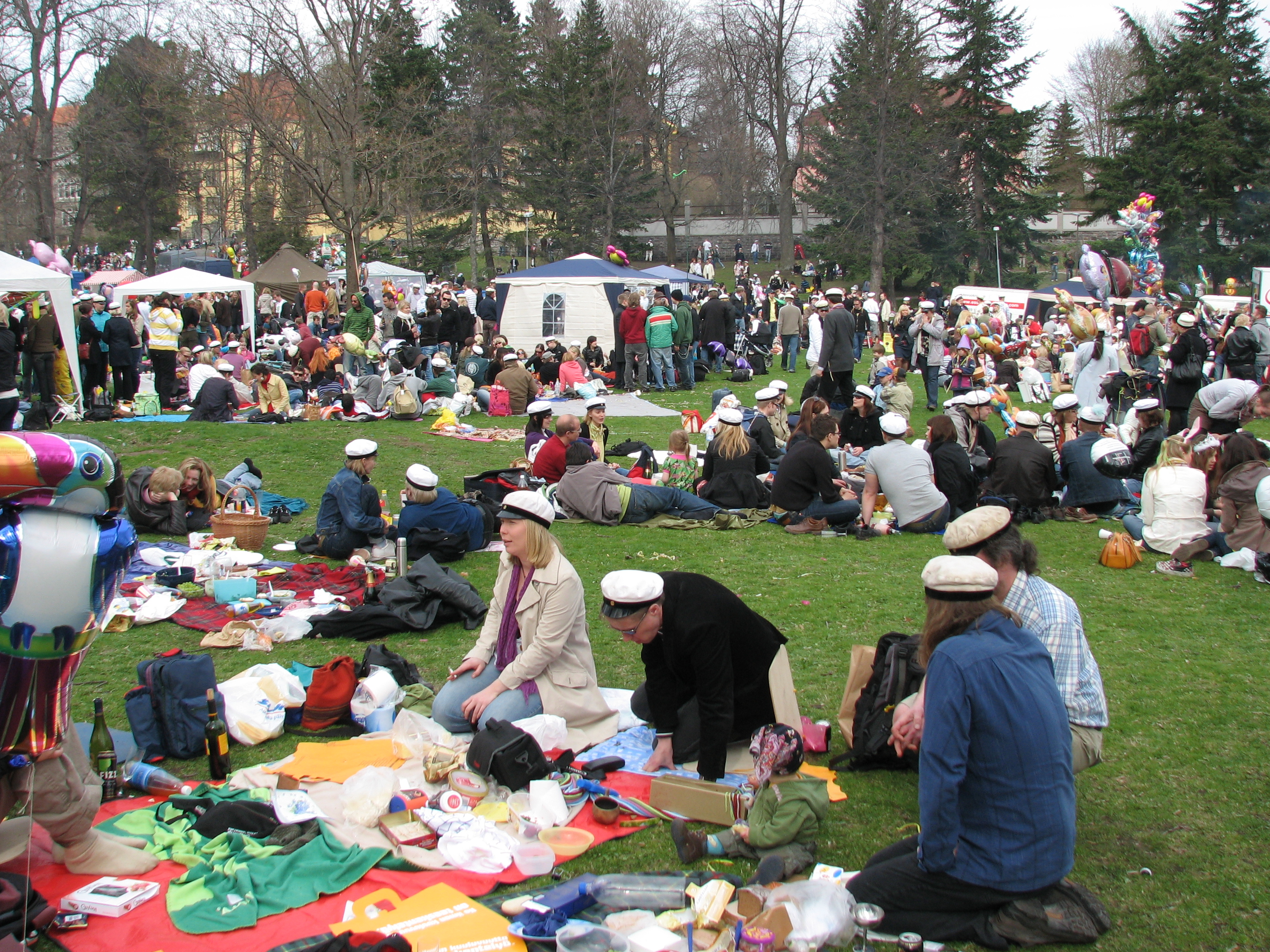
People at a vappu picnic in Kaivopuisto in 2008

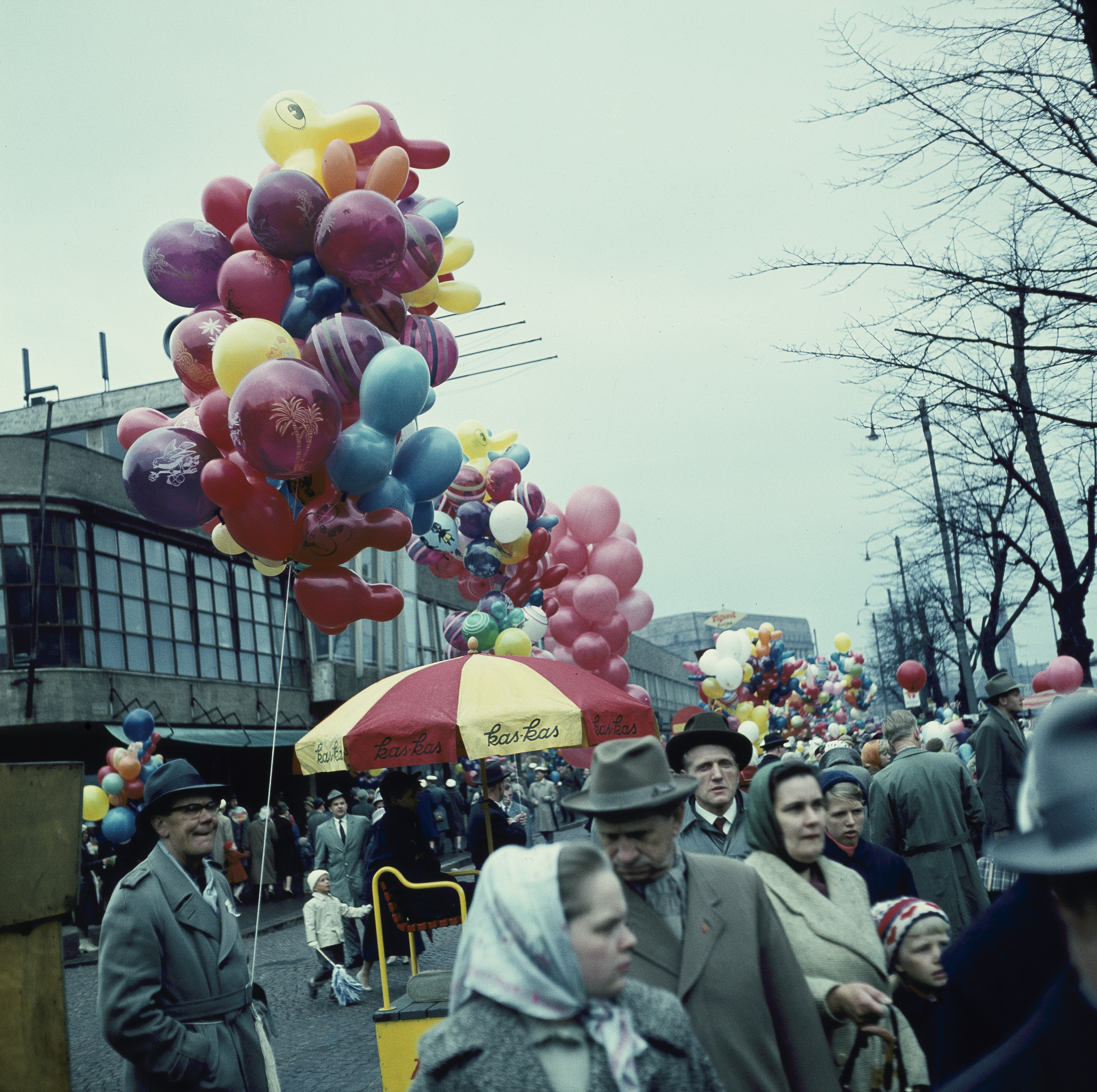
The crowd in front of Lasipalatsi in Helsinki, in 1960

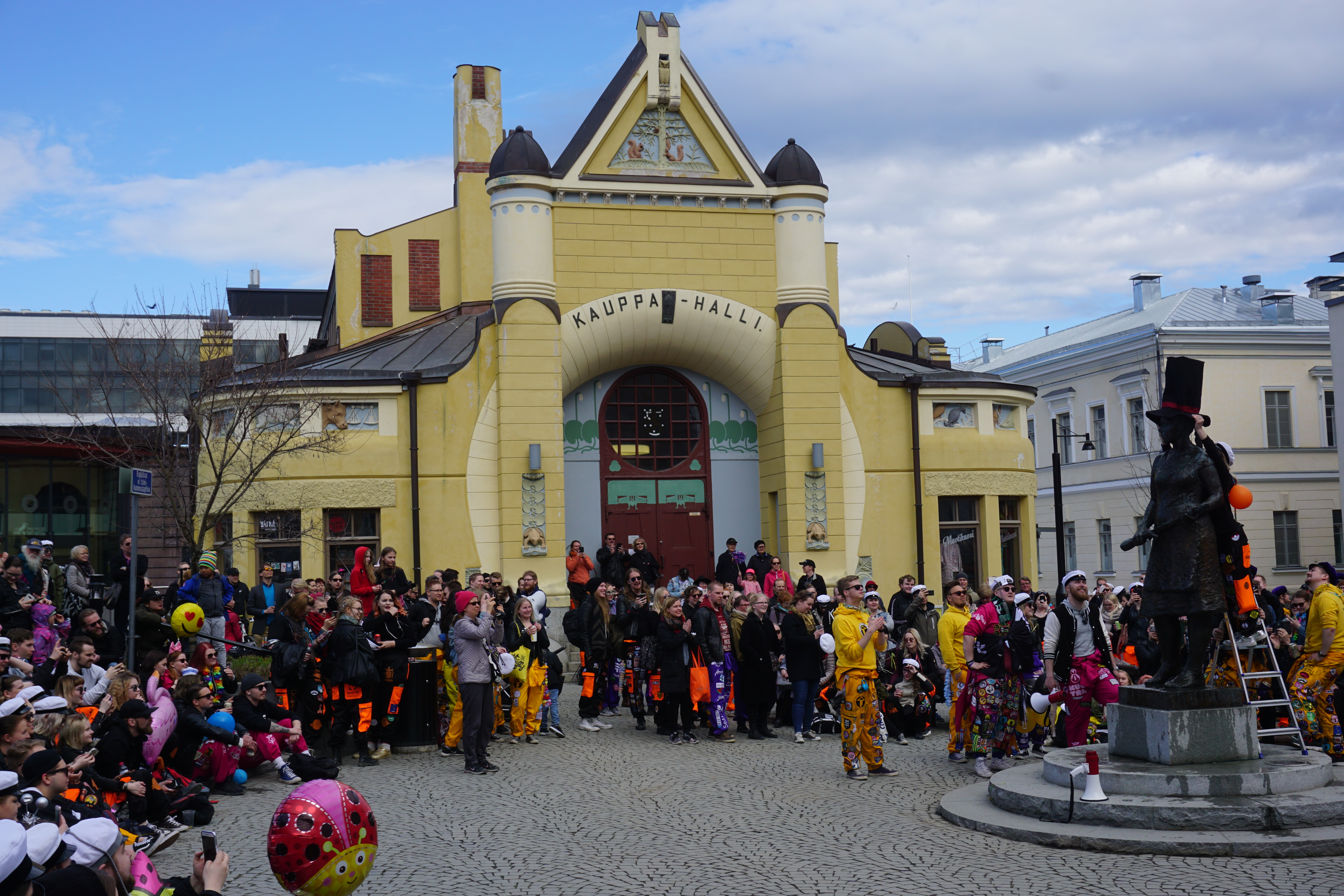
Vappu celebration in front of a Kuopio Market Hall in Kuopio

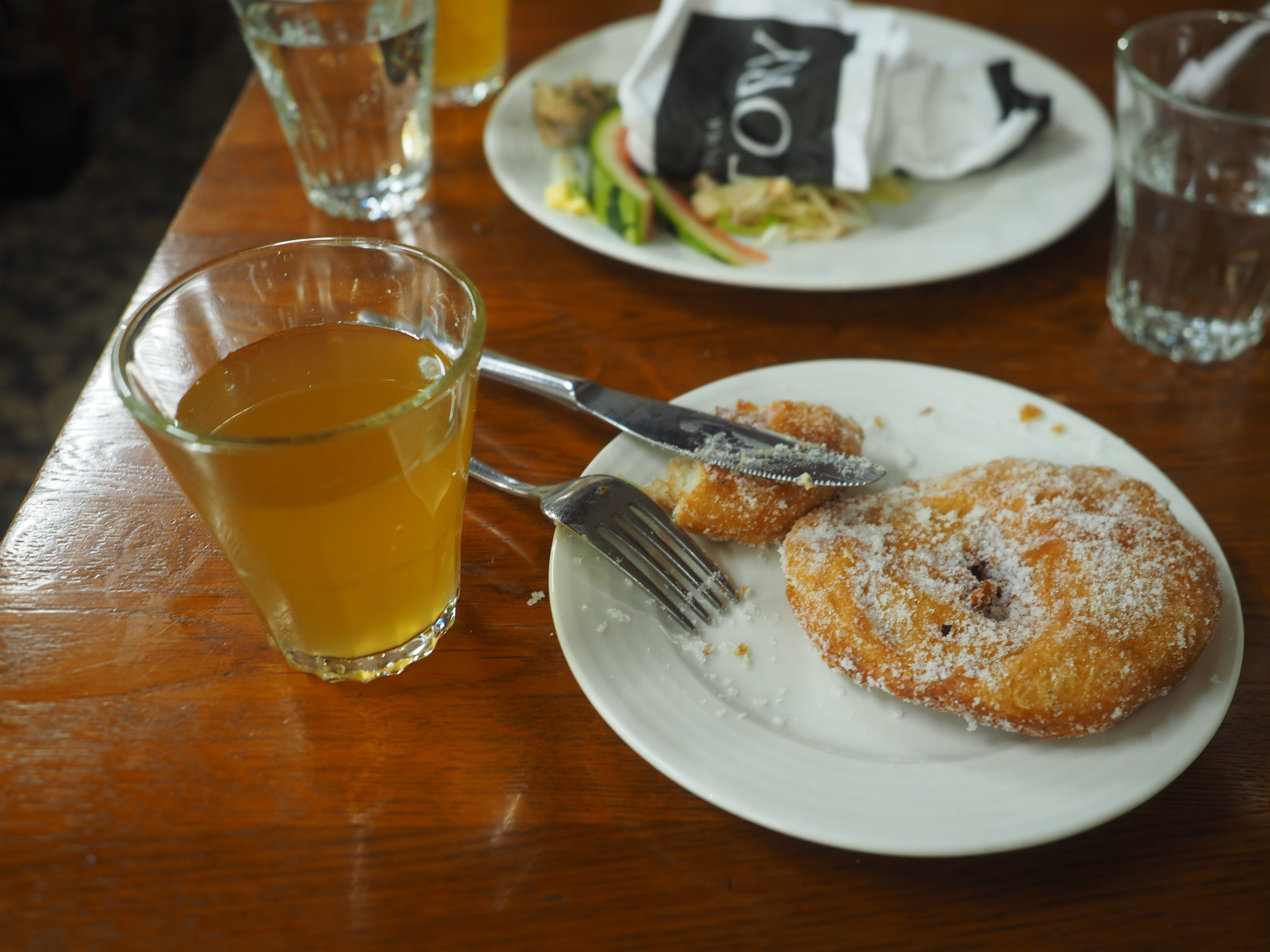
Sugar-coated doughnuts and sima are typical vappu delicacies in Finland

In Finland, Walpurgis night (Finnish: vappu; Swedish: vappen, valborg) is one of the four biggest holidays along with Christmas Eve, New Year's Eve, and Midsummer (juhannus, Swedish: midsommar). Walpurgis witnesses the biggest carnival-style festival held in Finland's cities and towns. The celebration, which begins on the evening of 30 April and continues on 1 May, typically centres on the consumption of sima, sparkling wine and other alcoholic beverages. Student traditions, particularly those of engineering students, are one of the main characteristics of vappu. Since the end of the 19th century, this traditional upper-class feast has been appropriated by university students. Many high school alumni wear the black and white student cap and many higher education students wear student coveralls. One tradition is to drink sima, a home-made low-alcohol mead, along with freshly cooked tippaleipä.

In the capital, Helsinki, and its surrounding region, fixtures include the capping on 30 April at 6 pm of Havis Amanda, a nude female statue in Market Square, and the biennially alternating publications of ribald matter called äpy and Julkku, by engineering students of Aalto University. Both are sophomoric; but while Julkku is a standard magazine, Äpy is always a gimmick. Classic forms have included an äpy printed on toilet paper and on a bedsheet. Often, äpy has been stuffed inside standard industrial packages, such as sardine cans and milk cartons. For most university students, vappu starts a week before the day of celebration. The festivities also include a picnic on 1 May, which is sometimes more lavish, particularly in Ullanlinnanmäki in central Helsinki.

In Turku, it has become a tradition to cap the Posankka statue.

In Oulu, the statue of Frans Michael Franzén is traditionally capped by the Guild of the Humanities in the University of Oulu. This is followed by the "dipping" of the students of technical fields ending their freshman year. This means that the freshmen plunge into a (usually) cold ditch in the nearby park, one by one.

Vappu coincides with the socialist International Workers' Day parade. Expanding from the parties of the left, the whole of the Finnish political scene has adopted vappu as the day to go out on stumps and agitate. This is not limited only to political activists; many institutions, such as the Lutheran Church of Finland, have followed suit, marching and making speeches. Left-wing activists of the 1970s still party on May Day. Carnivals are arranged, and many radio stations play leftist songs, such as The Internationale.

Traditionally, 1 May is celebrated by the way of a picnic in a park. For most, the picnic is enjoyed with friends on a blanket with food and sparkling wine. Some people arrange extremely lavish picnics with pavilions, white tablecloths, silver candelabras, classical music, and extravagant food. The picnic usually starts early in the morning, where some of the previous night's party-goers continue their celebrations from the previous night.

Some student organisations reserve areas where they traditionally camp every year. Student caps, mead, streamers and balloons have their role in the picnic and the celebration as a whole.

=== Germany ===
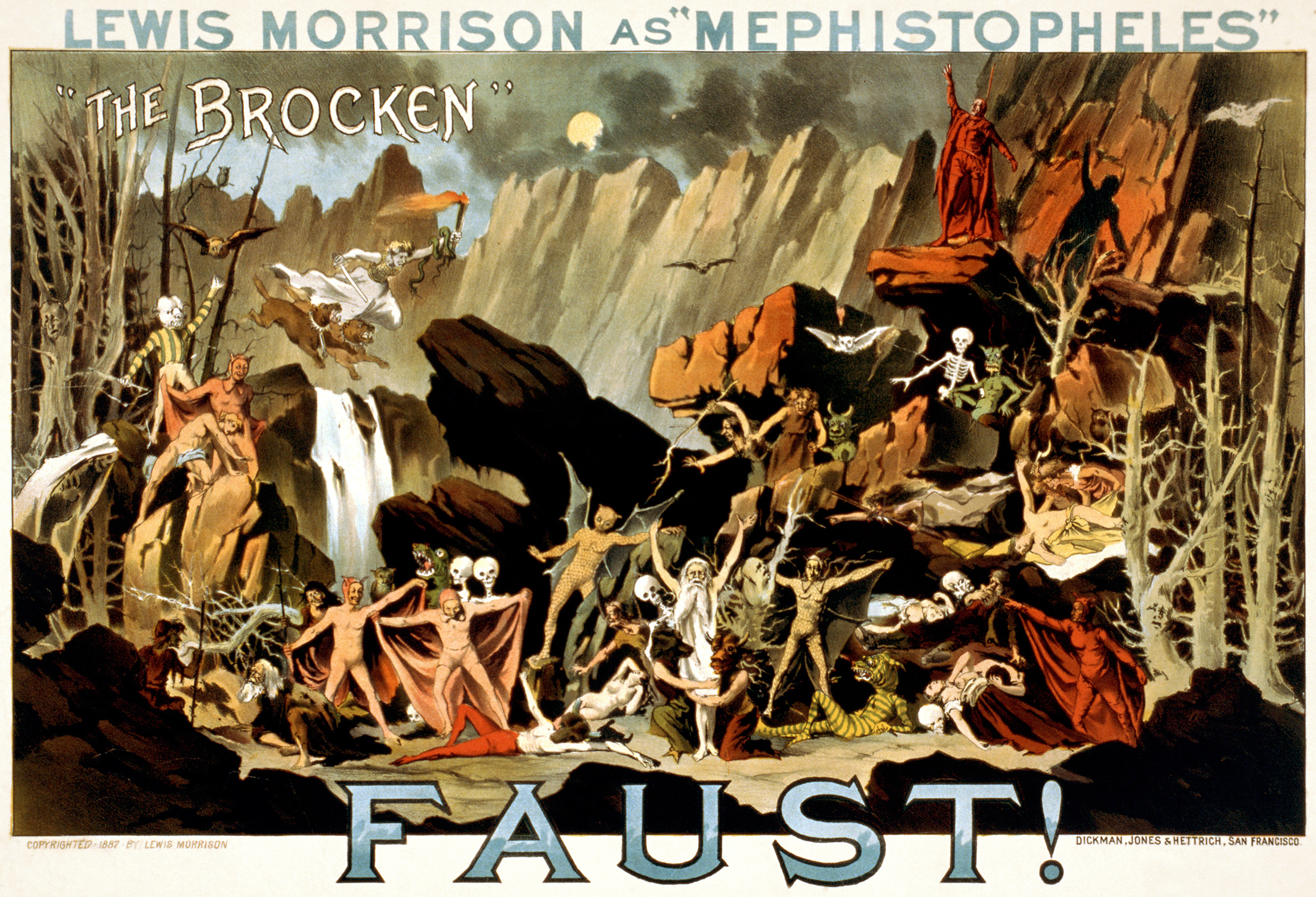
Lewis Morrison as "Mephistopheles" in Faust!: "The Brocken". Poster for a theatrical performance of Goethe's play showing Mephistopheles conjuring supernatural creatures on the German mountain, the Brocken (or Blocksberg), which according to the tale is the scenery for the Walpurgisnight, from 30 April to 1 May

On the Feast of Saint Walburga, "many thousand" people have made Christian pilgrimages to Saint Walburga's tomb in Eichstätt on the Feast of Saint Walburga, often obtaining vials of Saint Walburga's oil.

In Germany, Hexennacht ('Witches' Night'), the night from 30 April to 1 May, is the night when witches are reputed to hold a large celebration on the Brocken and await the arrival of spring and is held on the same night as Saint Walpurgis Night (Sankt Walpurgisnacht).

Walpurgisnacht Night (in German folklore) the night of 30 April (May Day's eve), when witches meet on the Brocken mountain and hold revels with the Devil...

Brocken is the highest of the Harz Mountains of north central Germany. It is noted for the phenomenon of the Brocken spectre and for witches' revels which reputedly took place there on Walpurgis night.

The Brocken Spectre is a magnified shadow of an observer, typically surrounded by rainbow-like bands, thrown onto a bank of cloud in high mountain areas when the sun is low. The phenomenon was first reported on the Brocken.

A scene in Goethe's Faust Part One is called "Walpurgisnacht," and one in Faust Part Two is called "Classical Walpurgisnacht." The last chapter of book five in Thomas Mann's The Magic Mountain is also called "Walpurgisnacht." In Edward Albee's 1962 play Who's Afraid of Virginia Woolf?, Act Two is entitled "Walpurgisnacht."

From Bram Stoker's short story, Dracula's Guest, an Englishman (whose name is never mentioned) is on a visit to Munich before leaving for Transylvania. It is Walpurgis Night, and in spite of the hotelier's warning not to be late coming back, the young man later leaves his carriage and wanders toward the direction of an abandoned "unholy" village. As the carriage departs with the frightened and superstitious driver, a tall and thin stranger scares the horses at the crest of a hill.

In some parts of northern coastal regions of Germany, the custom of lighting huge fires is still kept alive to celebrate the coming of May, while most parts of Germany have a derived Christianized custom around Easter called "Easter fires" (Osterfeuer).

In rural parts of southern Germany, it is part of popular youth culture to play pranks such as tampering with neighbours' gardens, hiding possessions, or spraying graffiti on private property.

In Berlin, traditional leftist May Day riots usually start at Walpurgis Night in the Mauerpark in Prenzlauer Berg. There is a similar tradition in the Schanzenviertel district of Hamburg, though in both cases, the situation has significantly calmed down in the past few years.

=== Hungary ===
In Hungary elderberries decorated the houses, which were used to ward off witches this day, because the Hungarians believed that different plants can protect against various diseases or supernatural dangers. But most witchcraft traditions occurred earlier in the spring festival cycle, on Saint George's Day (Szent György napja), because of the proximity of May Day and Pentecost.

In some places, these beliefs have not yet died out on Wilpurgis Night. In Késmárk the Hungarian population still knows about the fairy of the Thököly castle (Thököly vár), who sweeps the area around the Hungarian well at the dawn of Pentecost, and they still know about the witches who walk on May Day and Pentecost, but in most places, the source of evil was replaced by fire, ice, caterpillars and diseases as the country become more secular.

=== Netherlands ===
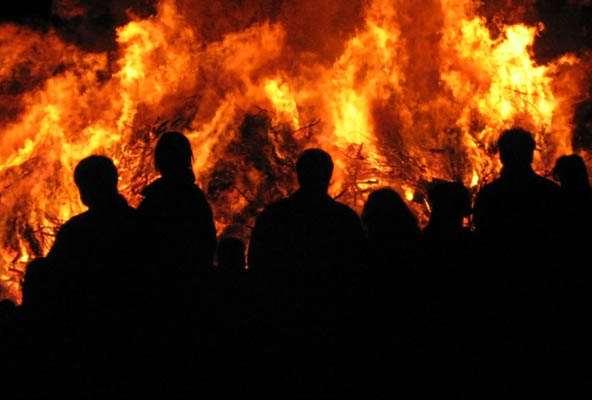
Walpurgis night bonfires

As in all Germanic countries, Sankt Walpurgisnacht was celebrated in areas of what is now the Netherlands. It has not been celebrated recently due to the national Koninginnedag (Queen's Day) falling on the same date, though the new koningsdag (King's Day) is on 27 April. The island of Texel celebrates a festival known as the 'Meierblis' (roughly translated as 'May-Blaze') on that same day, where bonfires are lit near nightfall, just as on Walpurgis, but with the meaning to drive away the remaining cold of winter and welcome spring. Occasional mentions to the ritual occur, and at least once a feminist called group co-opted the name to call for attention to the position of women (following the example of German women's organizations), a variety of the Take Back the Night phenomenon.

Still, in recent years a renewed interest in pre-Christian religion and culture has led to renewed interest in Heksennacht (Witch's Night) as well. In 1999, suspicions were raised among local Reformed party members in Putten, Gelderland of a Heksennacht festival celebrated by Satanists. The party called for a ban. That such a festival even existed, however, and that it was 'Satanic' was rejected by most others. The local Church in Dokkum, Friesland, organized a Service in 2003 to pray for the Holy Spirit to, according to the church, counter the Satanic action.

=== Sweden ===
While the name Walpurgis is taken from the 8th-century British Dumnonian Christian missionary Saint Walburga, valborg, as it is called in Swedish, also marks the arrival of spring. The forms of celebration vary in different parts of the country and between different cities. Walpurgis celebrations are not a family occasion but rather a public event, and local groups often take responsibility for organising them to encourage community spirit in the village or neighbourhood. Celebrations normally include lighting the bonfire, choral singing and a speech to honour the arrival of the spring season, often held by a local celebrity.

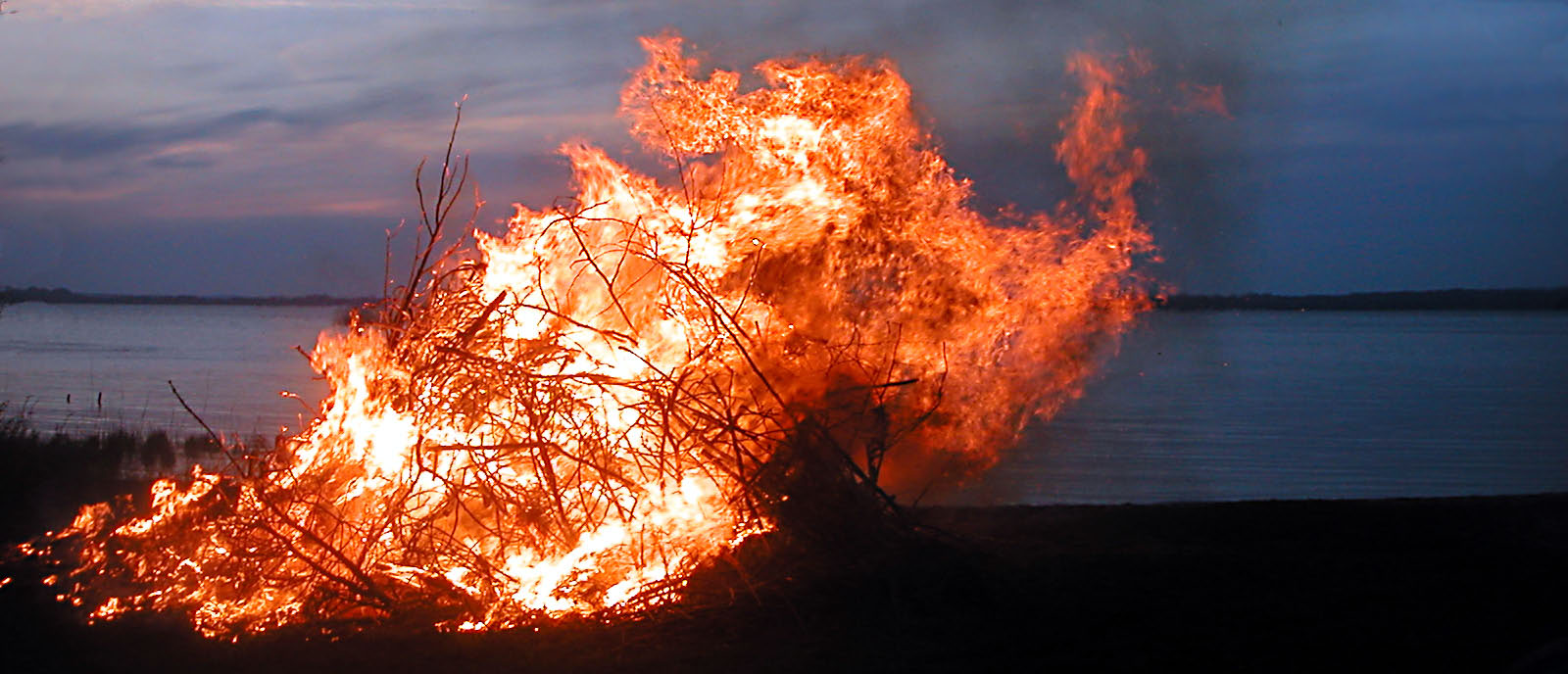
Walpurgis Night bonfire in Sweden

In the Middle Ages, the administrative year ended on 30 April. Accordingly, this was a day of festivity among the merchants and craftsmen of the town, with trick-or-treat, dancing and singing in preparation for the forthcoming celebration of spring. Sir James George Frazer in The Golden Bough writes, "The first of May is a great popular festival in the more midland and southern parts of Sweden. On the eve of the festival, huge bonfires, which should be lighted by striking two flints together, blaze on all the hills and knolls."

Walpurgis bonfires are part of a Swedish tradition dating back to at least the early 18th century. At Walpurgis (valborg), farm animals were let out to graze and bonfires (majbrasor, kasar) lit to scare away predators. In Southern Sweden, an older tradition, no longer practiced, was for the younger people to collect greenery and branches from the woods at twilight. These were used to adorn the houses of the village. The expected reward for this task was to be paid in eggs.

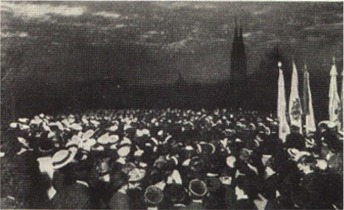
A big crowd, mostly students in typical Swedish white student caps, participating in the traditional Saint Walpurgis Night celebration with song outside the Castle in Uppsala. The silhouette of the cathedral towers may be seen in the background. To the right are banners and standards of the student nations. Image from c. 1920.

Choral singing is a popular pastime in Sweden, and on Walpurgis Eve virtually every choir in the country is busy. Singing traditional songs of spring is widespread throughout the country. The songs are mostly from the 19th century and were spread by students' spring festivities. The strongest and most traditional spring festivities are also found in the old university cities, such as Uppsala and Lund, where undergraduates, graduates, and alumni gather at events that last most of the day from early morning to late night on 30 April, or siste april ("The Last Day of April") as it is called in Lund, or sista april as it is called in Uppsala. For students, Walpurgis Eve heralds freedom. Traditionally the exams were over and only the odd lecture remained before term ends. On the last day of April, the students don their characteristic white caps and sing songs of welcome to spring, to the budding greenery and to a brighter future.

More modern valborg celebrations, particularly among Uppsala students, often consist of enjoying a breakfast including champagne and strawberries. During the day, people gather in parks, drink considerable amounts of alcoholic beverages, barbecue, and generally enjoy the weather, if it happens to be favorable.

In Uppsala, since 1975, students honor spring by rafting on Fyris river through the center of town with rickety, homemade, in fact quite easily wreckable, and often humorously decorated rafts. Several nations also hold "Champagne Races" (Swedish: champagnegalopp), where students go to drink and spray champagne or sparkling wine on each other. The walls and floors of the old nation buildings are covered in plastic for this occasion, as the champagne is poured around recklessly and sometimes spilled enough to wade in. Spraying champagne is, however, a fairly recent addition to the Champagne Race. The name derives from the students running down the slope from the Carolina Rediviva library to drink champagne, toward the student nations.

In Linköping many students and former students begin the day at the park Trädgårdsföreningen, in the field below Belvederen where the city laws permit alcohol, to drink champagne breakfast in a similar way to Uppsala. Later, at three o'clock, the students and public gather at the courtyard of Linköping Castle. Spring songs are sung by the Linköping University Male Voice Choir, and speeches are made by representatives of the students and the university professors.

In Gothenburg, the carnival parade, The Cortège, which has been held since 1909 by the students at Chalmers University of Technology, is an important part of the celebration. It is seen by around 250,000 people each year. Another major event is the gathering of students in Garden Society of Gothenburg to listen to student choirs, orchestras, and speeches. An important part of the gathering is the ceremonial donning of the student cap, which stems from the time when students wore their caps daily and switched from black winter cap to white summer cap.

In Umeå, there is an old tradition of having local bonfires. During recent years, however, there has also been a tradition of celebrating Walpurgis at the Umeå University campus. The university organizes student choir singing, as well as other types of entertainment and a speech by the president of the university. Different stalls sell hot dogs, candy, soft drinks, etc.

=== United States ===
The Church of Satan was founded on Sankt Walpurgisnacht in 1966. Founder Anton Szandor LaVey states in The Satanic Bible that besides one's own birthday and Halloween, Walpurgisnacht ranks as an important Satanic holiday, noting the Eve of May has been memorialized as "symbolizing the fruition of the spring equinox", and chose the date well aware of the date's traditional association with witchcraft.

Additionally, The Satanic Temple celebrates Hexennacht as "a solemn holiday to honor those who were victimized by superstition".

== Cultural legacy in literature and music ==
- The event was the inspiration for a poem, Die erste Walpurgisnacht, by Johann Wolfgang von Goethe. In turn, composer Felix Mendelssohn in 1831 took the poem and set it to music, as a secular cantata (or "Sinfonie-Ballade" in the composer's correspondence) for soloists (alto, tenor, baritone, bass), chorus and orchestra.
- The short story "Dracula's Guest" by Bram Stoker takes place on Walpurgis Night. The strange happenings in the story are implied to be connected with it.
- The novel Jurgen: A Comedy of Justice by James Branch Cabell begins on "Walburga's Eve, when almost anything is rather more than likely to happen"
- "Repent Walpurgis" is a song by Procol Harum, released in 1967, known for its Bach-inspired melodies and instrumental composition. The title combines the concept of repentance with references to Walpurgis Night, a time associated with witches and revelry.
- The song "War Pigs" from English Heavy Metal band Black Sabbath was originally titled 'Walpurgis' in relation to Walpurgis night.
- Knights of Walpurgis is one of the names used for the Death Eaters, the primary antagonists of the Harry Potter novel series.
- The central confrontation of Lovecraft's short story "The Dreams in the Witch House" is set during Walpurgis Night.
- The "Walpurgis Night" is a reoccurring event in the video game Limbus Company.

== See also ==
- Allhallowtide
- Bald Mountain (folklore)
- Diwali
- Easter witch
- Mefistofele
- Holika Dahan
- Chaharshanbe Suri
- Trndez
- Bonfire Night
- Noc Walpurgi, 2015 film
