= Nummi, Turku =

City district in Turku, Finland

Coordinates: 60°27′30″N 22°18′30″E

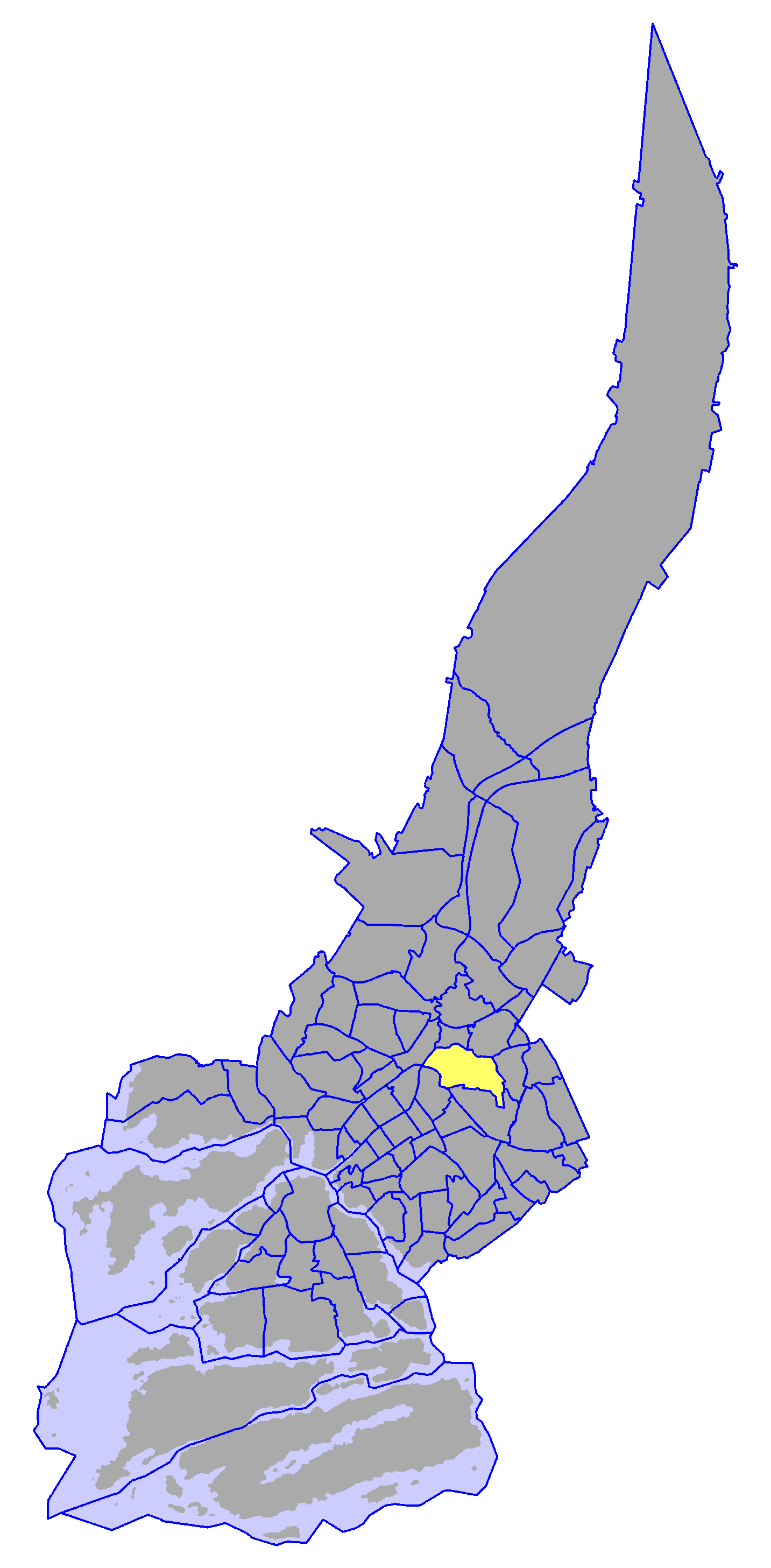
Nummi on a map of Turku.

Nummi (Finnish; Nummisbacken in Swedish) is a district and a suburb of the city of Turku, Finland. It is located in the north-eastern part of the city, just outside the city centre and south of the river Aura. It is the fourth largest district in Turku, having a population of 7,011 (as of 2004), with an annual growth rate of 2.21%.

10.03% of the district's population are under 15 years old, while 8.17% are over 65. The district's linguistic makeup is 87.98% Finnish, 5.65% Swedish, and 6.38% other.

Nummi is one of the oldest suburbs of Turku. In addition to the area of Nummi proper (sometimes called Nummenpakka in the local dialect), the district incorporates the former villages of Hannunniittu and Kuuvuori, as well as the Turku Student Village, the largest student housing complex in Finland.

== See also ==
- Districts of Turku
- Districts of Turku by population
