= National Union of University Students in Finland =

The National Union of University Students in Finland (Finnish: Suomen ylioppilaskuntien liitto (SYL) ry, Swedish: Finlands studentkårers förbund (FSF) rf) is the largest national organisation providing benefits and services for students in Finland. Its members, including student unions and one student body, consists of over 140,000 bachelor's and master's degree students as well as postgraduates. It was established in 1921.

The primary goals of SYL are the social position of students and the improvement of their study possibilities. In its activities, SYL concentrates on influencing nationwide legislation.

There is an executive board which is responsible for the activities of SYL. Marina Lampinen is the president of the executive board for 2013. The highest decision-making body in SYL is the November union meeting where student union representatives appoint the president and the executive board for the following year, decide on a plan of action, budget, administration and other possible issues brought forth.

The SYL Office is located in Helsinki along with the Finnish Student Sports federation (OLL), Union of Students in Finnish Universities of Applied Sciences (SAMOK) and the Student Research Foundation Otus. SYL is also a member of the European Students' Union (ESU).

== History ==
SYL was founded in 1921 by Suomen Ylioppilaskunta (now the Student Union of the University of Helsinki) and Åbo Akademis Studentkår (the Student Union of Åbo Akademi University). It was established on the need of students to participate in social deliberation and international cooperation in an orderly way.

In 1927, the student unions of the University of Turku, Helsinki University of Technology, Helsinki School of Economics and the Hanken School of Economics joined SYL, after which the organisation represented 5,515 students. Its action was patriotic and showed a spirit of national defence. This was seen, for example, as it was disengaging Swedish-language student unions from SYL as a result of language debates up until 1941.

After World War II, the building of an affluent society, political activation in the 1960s and a march influenced the activities of the union. Between the 1960s and 1970s, in the expansion of the Finnish university system, many new members from many new student unions joined SYL. In the 1990s, the educational status of students declined. Going into the work force was becoming greater, like the support from parents, even as the job market status decreased as a result of the universities of applied sciences (polytechnics) being established and the rising number of students. At the same time, however, education resources had not been raised.

From 1979 to 1984, SYL launched the common student card – at the time made of cardboard. With the card, a student got common benefits. SYL is a shareholder in Suomen Lyyra Ab which unifies and expands student services with a new Lyyra student card.

SYL has twenty-one membership bodies: all of Finland's twenty student unions as well as the student body of Snellman-college (Snellman-korkeakoulu) are members.

== Cooperation with other organisations ==
SYL is located in same office spaces with SAMOK, the national student organisation for universities of applied sciences. SYL and SAMOK cooperate in international affairs as well as on national advocacy affairs. SYL also cooperates heavily with the Finnish Ministry of Education and Culture and takes part in law making processes. The Finnish ministries send their requests for comments to SYL, whenever they need official statement from students on any national policy. On the international level, SYL's closest cooperators are the ESU and the Baltic and Nordic countries' national organisations.

== Notable members ==
SYL is regarded highly amongst the national decision makers and several recognized people have started their political careers at SYL:

- Tarja Halonen, former president of the Republic of Finland
- Jorma Ollila, former CEO of Nokia
- Ulf Sundqvist, minister in government for three times during the 70s and 80s
- Sari Sarkomaa, recent minister of education
- Ilkka Kanerva, recent minister of foreign affairs
- Matti Louekoski, previous minister of education, justice, finance and others, total 2,782 days in several cabinets
- Rosa Meriläinen, previous parliament member

Jaakko Laajava, Georg Ehrnrooth, Carl-Olaf Homén, Jaakko Ihamuotila, Jaakko Iloniemi and Hannu Taanila are amongst many others who have worked in SYL.
