= Posankka =

Statue located in Turku, Finland

Coordinates: 60°27′30.9″N 22°17′22.5″E

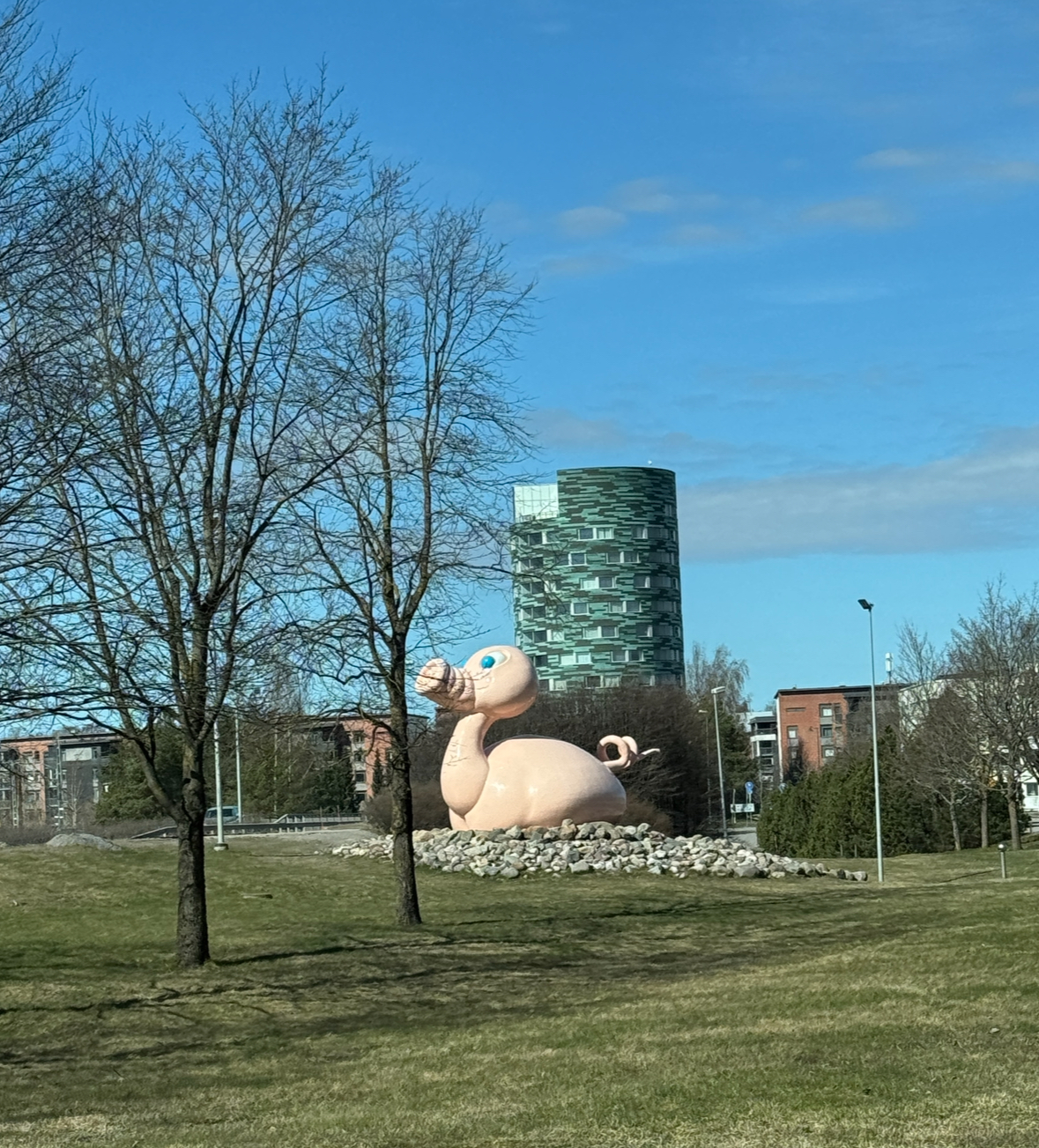
Posankka statue, Turku, Finland

Posankka (Swedish: Grisankan) is a statue located in Turku, Finland. The statue, which is located near the campus area of the University of Turku and the Turku Student Village, represents a hybrid between a marzipan pig ("possu") and a rubber duck ("ankka"). It is a pink animal with a duck's lower body and a pig's head.

The statue was designed by Alvar Gullichsen in 1999 when it was placed floating in the Aurajoki river in Turku. The statue has stood at its current location since 2001.

Every winter, a Santa Claus hat is put on Posankka's head, and for a few years on Walpurgis Night it was capped with a Finnish student cap.
