= Julkku =

Finnish student magazine

Julkku is a Finnish Walpurgis Night humour magazine published on even years by the students of Aalto University. First Julkku was published in 1978. Julkku features short jokes, satirical writings and humorous ads, pictures and drawings.

Humor magazines are an important part of Finnish Walpurgis Night, and students in overalls selling them are a common sight in university cities in Finland in late April.

== See also ==
- Äpy
