= Student Union of the University of Turku =

The Student Union of the University of Turku (TYY, in Finnish Turun yliopiston ylioppilaskunta) is a body to which, under public law, all University of Turku bachelor's and master's degree students belong. It is among the oldest student unions in Finland. Postgraduate and exchange students may become a member of TYY, but it is not obligatory. Visiting (non-degree students) are ineligible to join TYY.

TYY was founded in 1922 and it joined the National Union of University Students in Finland (SYL) in 1927. It is the second largest student union in Finland which has around 30,000 members. Its activities take place in Turku, Rauma, Pori and Salo.

As all student unions in Finland, TYY is a public corporation independent from its member university, which has an Executive Board and a Secretariat as well as a Student Council. TYY is amongst the first student unions that has made their fixed-term secretariat positions permanent in spring 2008 due to the dispute brought up in labour court about fixed-term working relationships that the Union of Students in Finnish Universities of Applies Sciences (SAMOK) lost in February 2088.

== Activities ==
The Student Union of the University of Turku enforces the lobbying of education, social policy and international affairs at the university, city and national levels. It also provides student, cultural and sports services as well as organisation and support services for its student associations. TYY owns, among others, the majority of the student cafeterias and cafés in the campus area run by Unica Oy.

TYY has been publishing the student newspaper Turun ylioppilaslehti since 1930.

== Student organisations ==
The Student Union of the University of Turku includes several organisations, associations and student nations as well as associations concerning other interests.

Student nations

- Pohjalainen osakunta
- Satakuntalais-hämäläinen osakunta
- Savo-karjalainen osakunta
- Varsinaissuomalainen osakunta
