= Lemon pig =

Lemon decorated to look like a pig

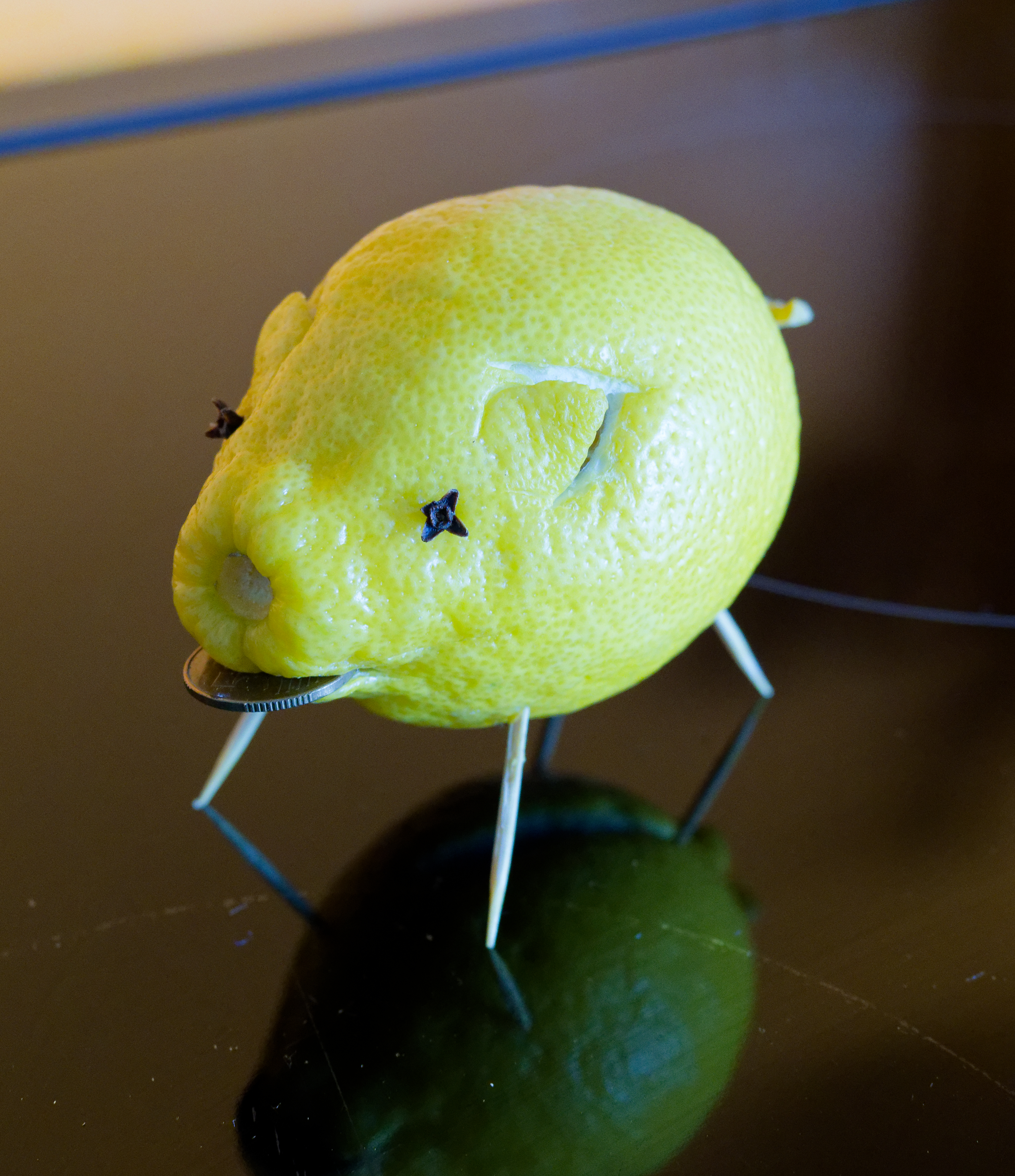
A pig made from a lemon with clove eyes, toothpick legs, and a coin in its mouth

A lemon pig is a lemon that has been decorated to take on the appearance of a pig. Construction normally includes matchstick legs, clove or peppercorn eyes and a foil tail. Early lemon pigs appear to have been made as amusements, but from the 1970s onwards they have become associated with good luck and the New Year in the cultures of some English-speaking countries.

== Origin ==
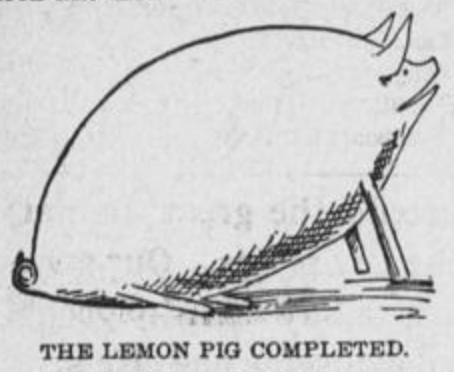
Image of a completed lemon pig in seated position, from The Enterprise newspaper, Wellington, Ohio, United States, 1898

The first mention of a lemon pig appears to be as a child's amusement in the book The Art of Amusing written by journalist Frank Bellew and released in the United States in 1865, although no construction details are given. The North American magazine Atlas Obscura found a lemon pig in a newspaper story in 1882. The 1895 book How to behave and how to amuse. A handy manual of etiquette and parlor games written by George Henry describes the creation of a pig from a lemon among a list of other 'tricks' that may be performed at a dinnertable, alongside such other tricks as a tortoise made from a muscatel raisin. The purpose appears to be merely to amuse. The same year a novel featured a character promising to make a lemon pig if a child behaves well. In 1902, Good Housekeeping magazine described the creation of lemon pigs as a novel way of serving a fruit cocktail or iced juice.

More recently, the creation of lemon pigs has become associated with New Year, and with good luck in English-speaking countries. These associations may have begun after their inclusion in the book 401 Party and Holiday Ideas from Alcoa. The ideas and recipes featured the use of Alcoa aluminium foil, and in this instance the pig had a tail made from twisted foil, and a coin inserted in its mouth. Retro food author Anna Pallai wrote about lemon pigs in a tweet from her account 70s Dinner Party in 2017, and this may have caused a modern resurgence in their popularity. Lemon pigs are created at New Year and kept until the end of the year, at which point the coin will be taken and given to a new lemon pig.

The Jimmy Carter Presidential Library, in Georgia, United States, had a lemon pig on display that had been sent to the 19th President of the U.S. Rutherford B. Hayes while in office. That pig is still in the collection of the Hayes Presidential Center. Chef Jacques Pépin has included lemon pigs in two of his recipe books.

== Construction ==
Construction of a lemon pig requires slicing a lemon to create ears and a mouth, and the insertion of four matchsticks for legs. Eyes may be made from cloves, peppercorns, or grapeseeds. A tail of twisted, curled foil or parsley may be added, although the pig sent to President Hayes had a tail made of twine. A coin may be inserted in the mouth.

== See also ==
- Marzipan pig
