= List of lucky symbols =

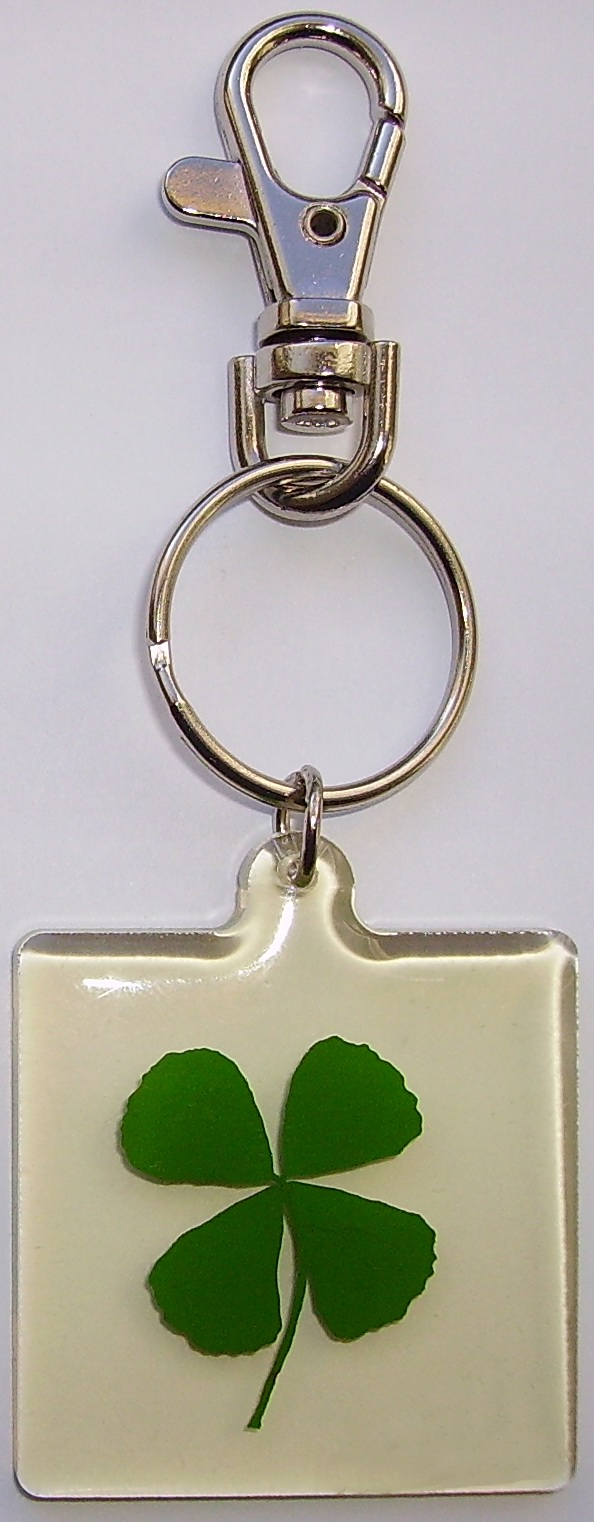
A keychain containing a four-leaf clover

A good luck charm is an amulet or other item that is believed to bring good luck. Almost any object can be used as a charm. Coins, horseshoes and buttons are examples, as are small objects given as gifts, due to the favorable associations they make. Many souvenir shops have a range of tiny items that may be used as good luck charms. Good luck charms are often worn on the body, but not necessarily.

== History ==
The mojo is a charm originating in African culture. It is used in voodoo ceremonies to carry several lucky objects or spells and intended to cause a specific effect. The concept is that particular objects placed in the bag and charged will create a supernatural effect for the bearer. Even today, mojo bags are still used. Europe also contributed to the concept of lucky charms. Adherents of St. Patrick (the patron saint of Ireland) adopted the four-leaf clover as a symbol of Irish luck because clovers are abundant in the hills of Ireland.

== List ==
Luck is symbolized by a wide array of objects, numbers, symbols, plant and animal life which vary significantly in different cultures globally. The significance of each symbol is rooted in either folklore, mythology, esotericism, religion, tradition, necessity, or a combination thereof.

Symbol	Culture	Notes
7	Western, Japanese	
8	Chinese, Japanese	Sounds like the Chinese word for "fortune". See Numbers in Chinese culture#Eight Used to mean the sacred and infinite in Japanese. A prime example is using the number 8 to refer to Countless/Infinite Gods (八百万の神, Yaoyorozu no Kami) (lit. Eight Million Gods). See 8#As a lucky number.
Aitvaras	Lithuania	
Acorns	Norse	
Albatross		Considered a sign of good luck if seen by sailors and they allow it to live.
Amanita muscaria	German	Seen as a good luck symbol to find one, similar to a 4-leaf clover in Irish tradition
Ashtamangala	Indian religions such as Hinduism, Jainism, and Buddhism	Buddhism: Endless knot, Lotus flower, Dhvaja, Dharmachakra, Bumpa, Golden Fish, Parasol, Conch; additional symbols for Hinduism and Jainism
Bamboo	Chinese	
Barnstar	United States	
Beemans gum	United States	Popular among early aviators, including Chuck Yeager, to provide good luck during flights
Chimney sweep	Many parts of the world	Said to bring good luck when being touched, especially on New Year and on weddings.
Corno portafortuna	Central and Southern Italy	
Ladybird beetles	German, Italian, Polish, Russian, Turkish, Brazilian, Serbian	There is an old children's song in Serbia "Let, let, bubamaro, donesi mi sreću" meaning "Fly, fly, ladybug, bring me the happiness". In Serbian, "sreća" means "good chances" as in a lottery or "happiness", but this is about emotions.
Dreamcatcher	Native American (Ojibwe)	In Native American Ojibwa culture the human mind was believed to be susceptible to dark spirits, when the mind is weakest (I.e. asleep) and would give bad dreams. In defense they would weave dream catchers. These talismans would let the good dream spirits through, whilst trapping the bad spirits in the pattern.
Fish	Chinese, Hebrew, Ancient Egyptian, Tunisian, Indian, Japanese	
Bird or flock going from right to left	Paganism	Auspicia
A monk passing through	Buddhist	
Four-leaf clover	Irish and Celtic, German, Polish	
Shamrock or Clover	Irish	While in most of the world, only the four-leafed clover is considered lucky, in Ireland all Irish Shamrocks are.
Horseshoe	English, Polish and several other European ethnicities, Indian and Nepali people.	Horseshoes are considered to ward off saturn’s ill-effects in Vedic culture. Some believe that upward-facing horseshoes catch luck, while others argue that downward-facing ones allow good fortune to flow onto those passing beneath. This usually depends on cultural and personal beliefs.
Jade	Chinese	
Jew with a coin	Poland	Thought to bring money.
Lemon pig	United States	Thought to be lucky, or to absorb bad luck.
The lù or 子 zi	Chinese	A symbol thought to bring prosperity.
Maneki-neko	Japanese, Chinese	Often mistaken as a Chinese symbol due to its usage in Chinese communities, the Maneki-neko is Japanese.
Peanut	United States	Often eaten before a high-stakes launch at JPL, started after Ranger 7 became the first successful Ranger mission after a coworker brought peanuts to mission control.
Pig	Chinese, German	
Pythons' eyes	Meitei culture	Believed that pythons' eyes bring positive attention, good fortune, guard against awa ana (Meitei for 'bad happenings') and the unhindered travelling to desired places.
Rabbit's foot	North America, England and Wales (originating from a hare's foot)	A rabbit's foot can be worn or carried as a lucky charm.
White rat	Roman Empire	The Romans sometimes saw rats as omens. A white rat was considered to be auspicious, while a black rat has unfortunate significance.
Wishbone	Europe, North America	
Sarimanok	Maranao	
Swallow	Korea	Rooted in Folktale 'Heungbu and Nolbu'
Swastika	Multiple cultures	The swastika or crux gammata (in heraldry fylfot), historically used as a symbol in Buddhism, Jainism and Hinduism, and widely popular in the early 20th century as a symbol of good luck or prosperity before adopted as a symbol of Nazism in the 1920s and 30s.
Tortoiseshell cat	Many cultures	Rooted in Folklore
White Elephant	Thai, Burmese	
White heather	Irish Travellers, Scotland	

== See also ==
- Horseshoe
- List of bad luck signs
- Luck
- Saint Cajetan, Patron saint of gamblers
- Apotropaic magic

== Sources ==
- Becker, Udo (2000). The Continuum Encyclopedia of Symbols. Continuum International Pub. ISBN 0-8264-1221-1. OCLC 461363881.
- Bessant, Claire (1999). Cat: The Complete Guide. Barnes & Noble. ISBN 0-7607-1718-4. OCLC 43543102.
- Binney, Ruth (2006). Nature's Ways: Lore, Legend, Fact and Fiction. David & Charles. ISBN 0-7153-2417-9. OCLC 70059876.
- Chapman, Mark (2004). "Nominally Chinatown". Reed College Luce Chinese Studies Grants. Archived from the original on 12 September 2012.
- Cioccolanti, Steve (2010). From Buddha to Jesus: An Insider's View of Buddhism and Christianity. Monarch Books. ISBN 978-1-85424-956-2. OCLC 455828844.
- Cooper, Jean C. (1978). An Illustrated Encyclopaedia of Traditional Symbols. Thames and Hudson. ISBN 0-500-27125-9. OCLC 61763660.
- DeMello, Margo (2009). Feet and Footwear: A Cultural Encyclopedia. MacMillan. ISBN 978-0-313-35714-5. OCLC 318420875.
- Dodge, Mary Mapes (1910). St. Nicholas. Vol. 37. Scribner & Co.
- Dolnick, Barrie; Davidson, Anthony H. (2007). Luck: Understanding Luck and Improving the Odds. Random House. ISBN 978-0-307-34750-3. OCLC 122309479.
- Eberhard, Wolfram (1986). A Dictionary of Chinese Symbols: Hidden Symbols in Chinese Life and Thought. Psychology Press. ISBN 0-415-00228-1. OCLC 18416687.
- Greer, Brian (2009). Culturally Responsive Mathematics Education. Taylor & Francis. ISBN 978-0-8058-6263-8. OCLC 262422858.
- Hackett, Olwen; Smith, D.J.; al-Athar, Maslahat (1984). Ghirza: A Libyan Settlement in the Roman Period. Dept. of Antiquities. OCLC 18457072.
- Hanson, James Austin (1994). Spirits in the Art: From the Plains and Southwest Indian Cultures. Lowell Press. ISBN 0-932845-66-5. OCLC 30859981.
- Helfman, Gene S. (2007). Fish Conservation: A Guide to Understanding and Restoring Global Aquatic Biodiversity and Fishery Resources. Island Press. ISBN 978-1-55963-595-0. OCLC 80180254.
- Iversen, Edwin (1996). Living Marine Resources: Their Utilization and Management. Springer. ISBN 0-412-98741-4. OCLC 32468091.
- Long, Michael (1989). "Symbol and Ritual in Josquin's Missa di Dadi". Journal of the American Musicological Society. 42 (1). University of California Press: 1–22. doi:10.1525/jams.1989.42.1.03a00010. ISSN 0003-0139. JSTOR 831416. OCLC 477562339.
- Marks, Gil (2010). Encyclopedia of Jewish Food. John Wiley & Sons. ISBN 978-0-470-39130-3. OCLC 501320645.
- Parker, Barbara (2005). Introduction to Globalization and Business: Relationships and Responsibilities. SAGE. ISBN 0-7619-4495-8. OCLC 60559232.
- Sen, Colleen Taylor (2004). Food Culture in India. Greenwood Pub. ISBN 0-313-32487-5. OCLC 55475094.
- Volker, T. (1950). The Animal in Far Eastern Art and Especially in the Art of the Japanese Netsuke, with References to Chinese Origins, Traditions, Legends, and Art. BRILL. ISBN 9004042954. OCLC 600653239.
- Webster, Richard (2008). The Encyclopedia of Superstitions. Llewellyn Worldwide. ISBN 978-0-7387-1277-2. OCLC 173748226.
- Welch, Patricia Bjaaland (2008). Chinese Art: A Guide to Motifs and Visual Imagery. Tuttle Publishing. p. 231. ISBN 978-0-8048-3864-1. OCLC 154701519.
