= Marzipan pig =

Marzipan candy in the shape of a pig

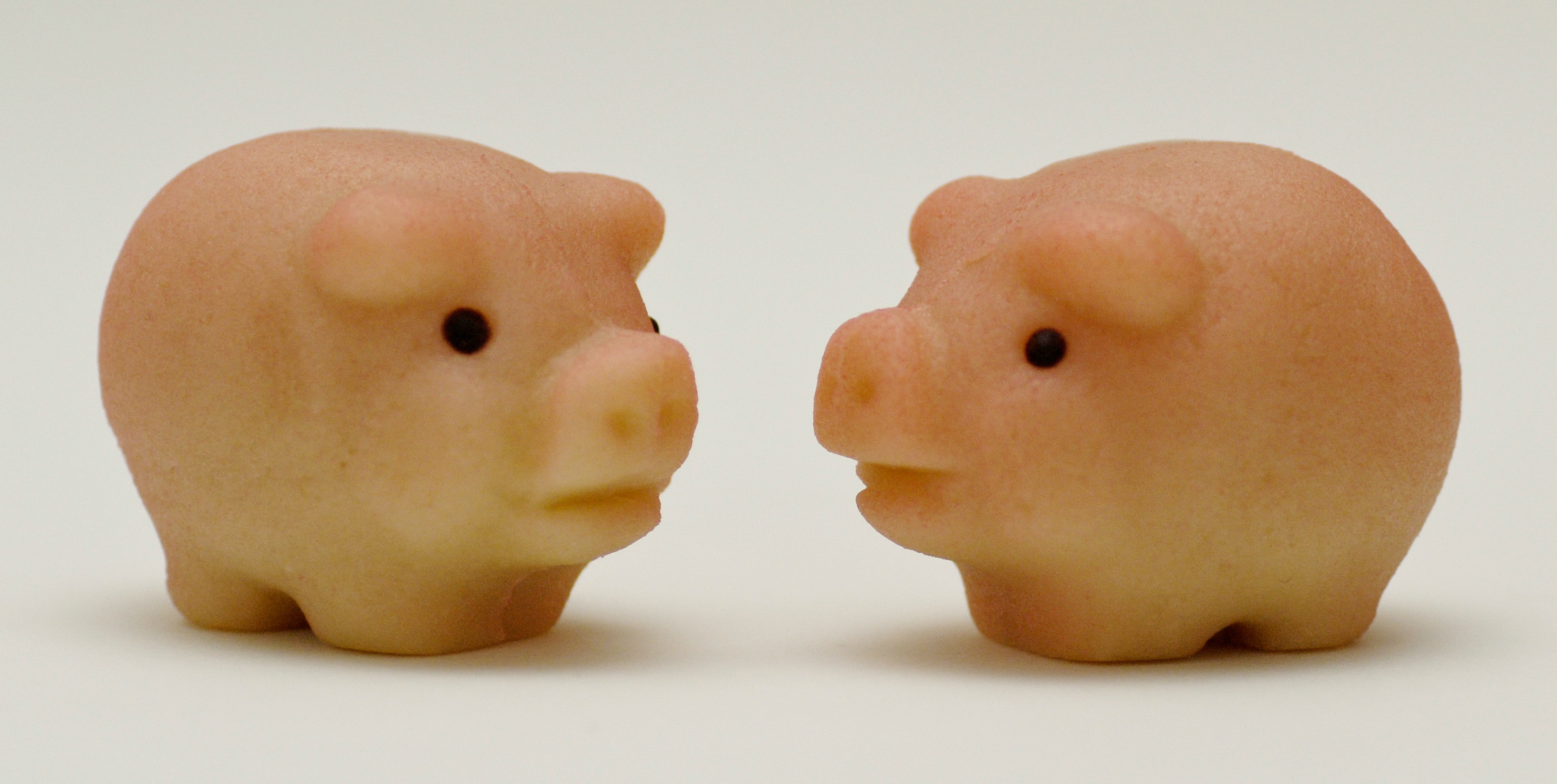
Marzipan pigs

The marzipan pig is a traditional German, Dutch, Belgian, and Scandinavian confectionery consisting of marzipan shaped as a pig.

During Jul in Norway, Sweden, and Denmark, a tradition is to eat a rice porridge known as risgrøt (risgrynsgröt in Swedish); a single almond is hidden in the porridge. Whoever finds the almond receives a marzipan pig as a prize. The same tradition exists for Christmas Eve in Denmark, but with risalamande. In Germany, marzipan pigs are given at New Year's for good luck (Glücksschwein).

== See also ==
- List of almond dishes
- Lemon pig
- Posankka
