= Äpy =

Finnish humour magazine

Äpy (often written as) is a traditional and the oldest Finnish humour magazine published related to the Walpurgis Night festivities. The magazine is published by Äpy-lehtien Liitto ry. Throughout the years, Äpy's proceeds have supported a wide range of technical student activities, including the construction of saunas and the Polyteekkarimuseo, the organization of concerts and spex, the publication of histories, and assistance with other important purchases.

== History and profile ==
Äpy was first published in Christmas 1948. The magazine is published in odd-numbered years by the students of Aalto University (previously called Helsinki University of Technology). It is printed extraordinarily, for instance on toilet paper and a bedsheet.

== See also ==
- Julkku
