= Belvederen =

Building in Linköping, Sweden

Coordinates: 58°24′21″N 15°37′13″E

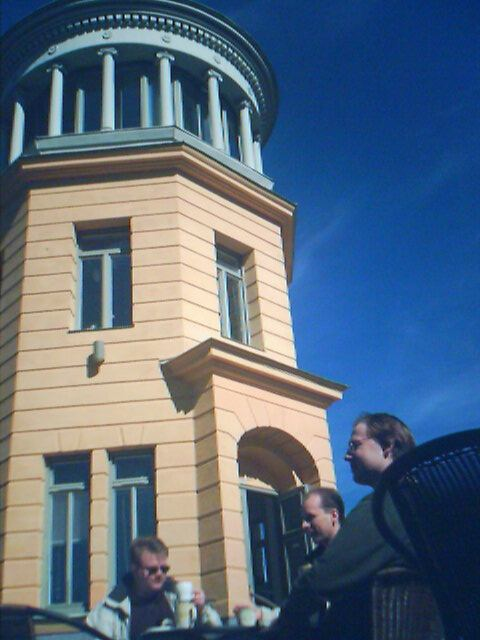

Belvederen is a historic building in Linköping, Sweden. It is located on Kjettilberget (Kjettil-hill) in the center of the town. The hill reaches 45 m over the lake Roxen and is the second highest point in Linköping. The building is 22 m high and was built in 1881. This gives the visitor a vantage point of approximately 67 m. (220 ft.).

Currently the building houses a café and a restaurant. On the top floor a number of floor mounted binoculars are available to give the visitor a good view over Linköping city.
