= CSE =

CSE or cse may refer to:

== Education ==
- Comprehensive sexuality education

=== Examinations ===
- Certificate of Secondary Education, a secondary school qualification in the UK, replaced by the GCSE
- Civil Services Examination, an examination to qualify for government service in India

=== Field of study ===
- Cognitive systems engineering, the intersection of people, work, and technology, with a focus on safety-critical systems
- Computational science and engineering, the science and engineering of computation, usually associated with high performance computing
- Computer science and engineering, a degree program that combines aspects of both computer science and computer engineering program
- Control systems engineering, a field of engineering concerning how to design systems that reacts to input in desirable ways

=== Schools ===
- Chalmers School of Entrepreneurship, a school within Chalmers University of Technology and University of Gothenburg, Sweden
- Collège du Saint-Esprit, a Catholic, boys-only, secondary school based in Mauritius
- College of Saint Elizabeth, a Catholic liberal arts college in New Jersey, US

== Finance ==
- Calcutta Stock Exchange, India
- Canadian Securities Exchange, Toronto
- Casablanca Stock Exchange, Morocco
- Chittagong Stock Exchange, Bangladesh
- Cochin Stock Exchange, India
- Colombo Stock Exchange, a Sri Lankan stock exchange
- Copenhagen Stock Exchange, former name of Nasdaq Copenhagen, Denmark
- Cyprus Stock Exchange

== Organisations ==
- Compañía Sevillana de Electricidad, a Spanish electricity generation company
- Centre for Science and Environment, an Indian non-governmental organization
- Center for Sustainable Enterprise, a research center at the Illinois Institute of Technology
- Citizens for a Sound Economy, a conservative political group in the United States
- Conference of Socialist Economists, as an international, democratic membership organisation
- Corpus Speculorum Etruscorum, a project to publish all existing Etruscan mirrors
- Council of Science Editors, supports editorial practice among scientific writers
- Creation Science Evangelism, a Christian ministry of Kent Hovind

=== Government ===
- Communications Security Establishment, a Canadian intelligence agency
- Combined Services Entertainment, official provider of live entertainment to the British Armed Forces
- Supreme Electoral Council (Nicaragua), the body that oversees elections in Nicaragua

== Science and medicine ==
- Chronic solvent-induced encephalopathy, a condition induced by long-term exposure to solvents
- Circumstellar envelope, part of a star that is not gravitationally bound to the star core
- Combined spinal and epidural anaesthesia, an anaesthetic technique
- CSE1, a yeast chromosome-segregation protein and member of the CAS/CSE protein family
- Cystathionine gamma-lyase, an enzyme

== Technology ==
- Common subexpression elimination, a compiler optimization technique
- Collaborative search engine
- Comparison shopping engine, a shopping search engine that compares prices between shops
- Cell supervising electronic circuit, part of a battery management system

== Other uses ==
- Commander of the Order of the Star of Ethiopia
- Clinical sleep educator
- Clube Sociedade Esportiva, a Brazilian football (soccer) club
- Colloquial Singapore English, also known as Singlish, a contact language spoken in Singapore
- Czech Sign Language (ISO 639:cse)
- Crime Scene Examiner, a scenes of crime officer in the United Kingdom
- Child sexual exploitation
