= The Institute of Technology at Linköping University =

Faculty at Linköping University

- Tekniska högskolan vid Linköpings universitet
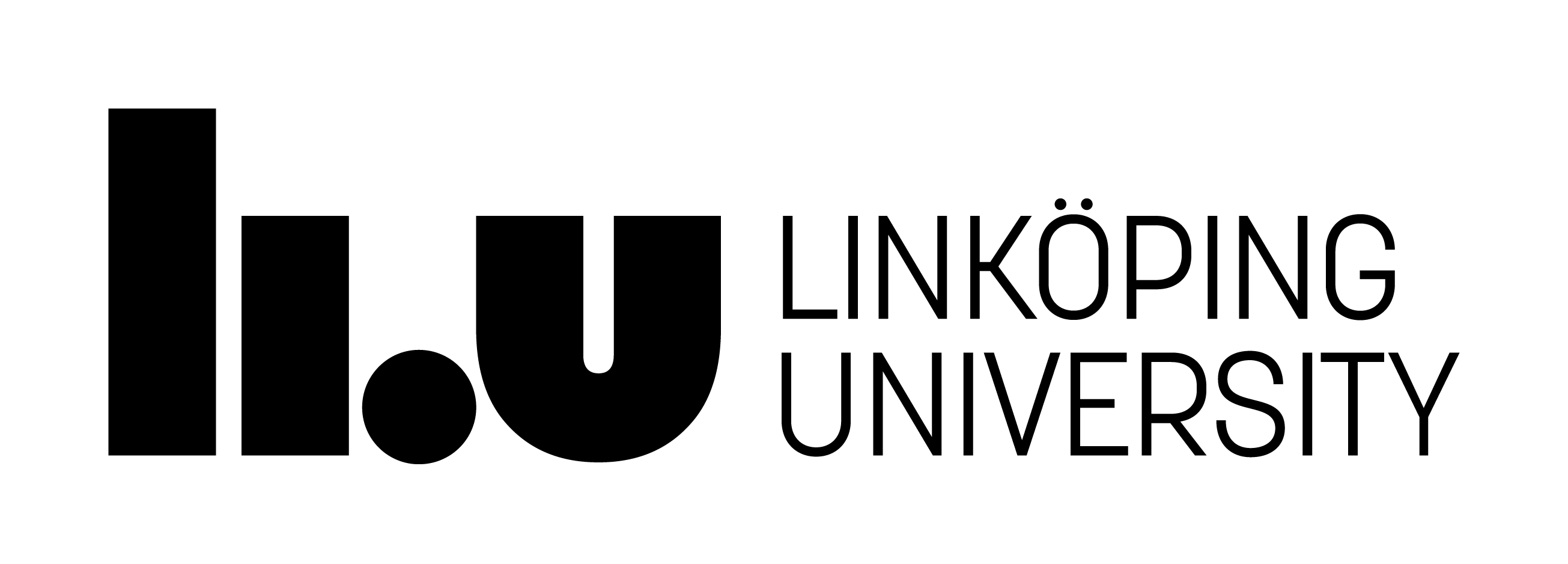
- Type: Public university
- Established: 1970
- Dean: Johan Ölvander
- Administrative staff: > 1000
- Students: > 12000
- Location: Linköping, Sweden; Norrköping, Sweden, Sweden
- Colors: Blue, Turquoise and Green
- Website: www.lith.liu.se

The Institute of Technology at Linköping University, or Tekniska högskolan vid Linköpings universitet (formerly Linköpings tekniska högskola, LiTH), is the faculty of science and engineering of Linköping University, located in Linköping and Norrköping in Sweden. Since its start in 1969, LiTH has had close ties with the Swedish transport and electronics industry in general and with Ericsson and SAAB in particular. The faculty has 1,400 staff members, out of whom 125 are professors, and 470 are lecturers with a PhD. The total number of students exceeds 12,000, with more than half being in post-graduate programs.

LiTH focuses its research and education in the areas of information technology, industrial engineering and management, materials technology, biomedical engineering, applied physics, production engineering and electronics. Interdisciplinary approaches and applied science are conducted in cooperation with the industry.

== Notable alumni ==
- Carl-Henric Svanberg, chairman BP, former CEO Ericsson, (Applied physics and Electrical Engineering)
- Mikael Ohlsson, CEO IKEA, (Industrial engineering and Management)
- Magnus Hall, President and CEO Holmen, (Industrial Engineering and Management)
- Håkan Eriksson, chief scientific officer Ericsson, (Applied Physics and Electrical Engineering)
- Åke Svensson, former CEO Saab, (Applied Physics and Electrical Engineering)
- Mats Oretorp, CEO Dell Sweden, Dell AB, (Industrial Engineering and Management)
- Björn Blomberg, CEO Swedfund, (Industrial Engineering and Management)
- Jan-Eric Sundgren, former rector Chalmers, (Applied Physics and Electrical Engineering)
- Mille Millnert, former rector Linköping University, (Applied Physics and Electrical Engineering)
- Founders of Configura Sverige AB, (Computer science engineering)
- Founders of Intentia (part of Lawson Software), (Industrial Engineering and Management)
- Founders of Industrial and Financial Systems, (Industrial Engineering and Management)

== Educational programmes ==
Master of Science programmes at Campus Valla:

- Aeronautical Engineering
- Industrial Engineering and Management
- Sustainability Engineering and Management
- Socware (System-On-Chip)
- Computer Science
- Computer Science and Engineering
- Information Technology
- Chemical Biology
- Engineering Biology
- Mechanical Engineering
- Applied Physics and Electrical Engineering
- Design and Product Development

Master of Science programmes at Campus Norrköping

- Electronics Design Engineering
- Communication and Transport Engineering
- Media Technology and Engineering

== See also ==
- Chalmers University of Technology
- Royal Institute of Technology
- Luleå University of Technology
- Lund Institute of Technology
- Umeå Institute of Technology
- List of universities in Sweden
- List of test pilot schools
