= Lindholmen Science Park =

Science park in Gothenburg, Sweden

Coordinates: 57°42′25″N 11°56′24″E

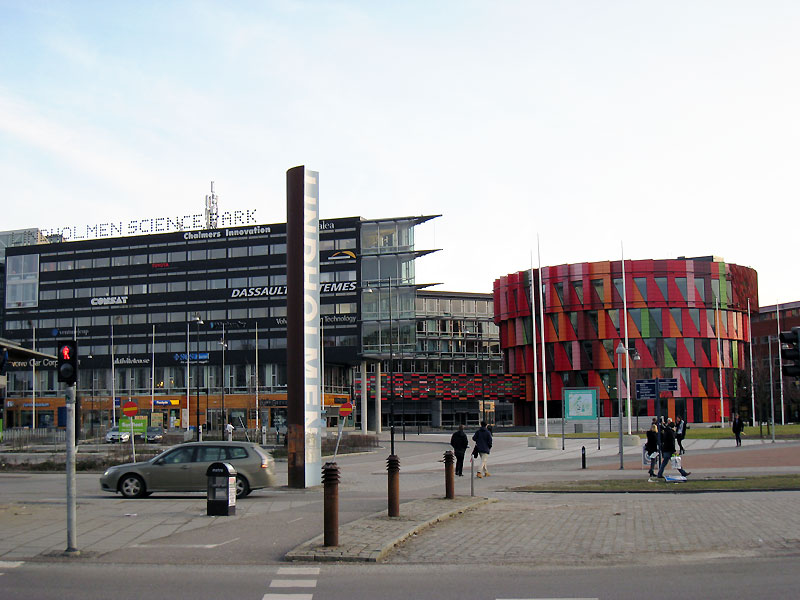
Lindholmen Science Park.

Lindholmen Science Park is a science park dedicated to research and development in mobile communication, intelligent vehicles and transports systems, and modern media industry, located in Lindholmen Gothenburg, Sweden.

Chalmers University of Technology, the University of Gothenburg, and the IT University of Göteborg collaborate with high tech industries and the local community in different development projects. Currently 250 companies with 24,000 employees are active at Lindholmen, the biggest companies are Volvo Cars, Volvo Technology, Ericsson, IBM, Semcon and SVT.

Campus Lindholmen has 10,000 university students, scientists, and teachers. Several gymnasiums are also located in the vicinity.

The main operators of Lindholmen Science Park are Gothenburg Municipality, Chalmers University of Technology, the University of Gothenburg, Volvo Group, Ericsson, Volvo Cars, Business Region Göteborg, TeliaSonera, Saab, and the Swedish Road Administration.
