= Chalmers Lindholmen University College =

University college in Gothenburg, Sweden

Coordinates: 57°42′23″N 11°56′15″E

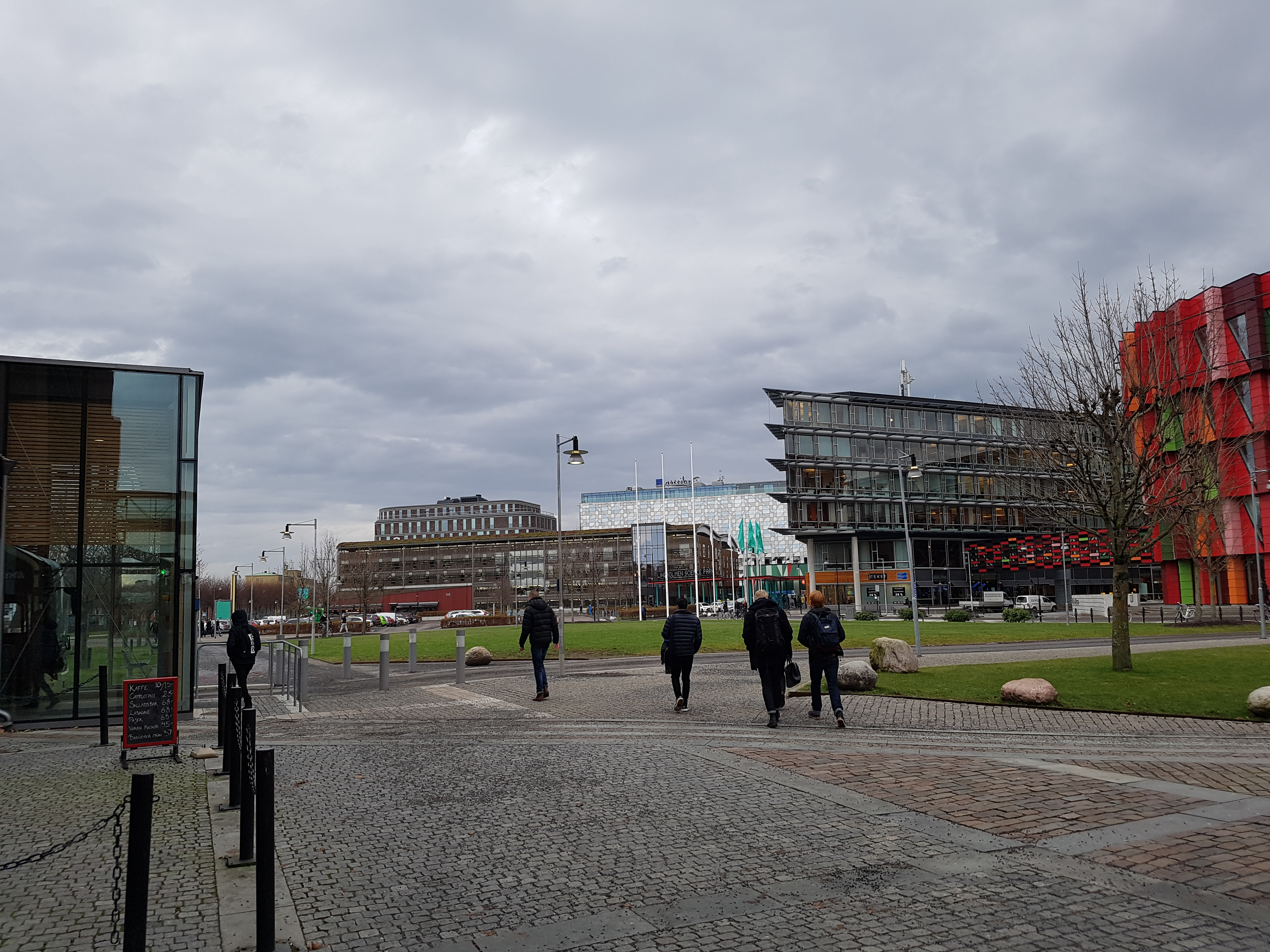
- View from Chalmers Lindholmen Campus
- Active: 1829–2005
- Chairman: Karin Markides
- Students: 2,700 (approx)
- Location: Gothenburg, Sweden
- Website: https://www.chalmers.se/

The Chalmers Lindholmen University College or Chalmers Lindholmen was a university college, and an affiliate of Chalmers University of Technology, located in Gothenburg, Sweden. The campus is located at Lindholmen on the island Hisingen. As of 2005, Chalmers Lindholmen no longer exists as a separate organisation. Campus Lindholmen is now one of Chalmers' two campuses.

== Schools ==
The organization is divided into schools.

- School of Engineering
- School of Maritime Studies
- School of Continuing and Professional Learning
- Centre of Research and Development

== Students ==
Around 2,700 undergraduate students are attending Chalmers Lindholmen University College.

Bachelor's degrees

- Building and Civil Engineering
- Building Technology, Business Development and Entrepreneurship
- Computer Engineering
- Design Engineering
- Electrical and Electronical Engineering
- Mechanical Engineering
- Mechatronics Engineering
- Marine Engineering
- Nautical Science
- Shipping and Logistics

Master's degrees

- Interaction Design and Technologies
- Software Engineering and Technology

== See also ==
- Chalmers Students' Union
- Lindholmen Science Park
