= Chalmers Naval Architecture Students' Society =

Student group at Chalmers University of Technology, Sweden

The Chalmers Naval Architecture Students' Society (also known as the Föreningen Chalmers Skeppsbyggare or FCS) is a naval architecture graduate students group at Chalmers University of Technology, Sweden. The Society was found in 1887 following the establishment of the Naval Architecture and Ocean Engineering Department at the university. Since 1948, Föreningen Chalmers Skeppsbyggare has been a member of the Nordic Technical Universities Shipbuilders Congress (NTHS) which includes Chalmers, Technical University of Denmark, Helsinki University of Technology in Finland, Norwegian University of Science and Technology, and the Royal Institute of Technology in Sweden. Roughly, half of the FCS members are from Sweden while the rest are international students. Some of its members are also current members of the Society of Naval Architects and Marine Engineers. Unlike other student organizations at Chalmers, the society runs as a separate entity from the Chalmers Students' Union.

== Organization ==
Current students attending the naval architecture program automatically become members of the organization. Countries representing the current FCS include Bangladesh, Canada, China, France, Germany, Iran, South Africa, Turkey, and the United States. Day-to-day activities of FCS are carried out by the board members. The Union board elections are held every year, and about ten to twelve students are selected to run the society. The board is divided into different committees to organize the various activities of the group. These committees or departments span from providing technical assistance in the drafting room to planning extracurricular social events. For example, the fish department of FCS is responsible for taking care of the fish tank located in the basement of the naval architecture building in Campus Lindholmen.

== Activities ==
Each year ten members of FCS represent Chalmers in the Nordic Technical Universities Shipbuilders Congress. Chalmers FCS hosted 2009 62nd annual NTHS congress. 2010 NTHS congress will be held in Finland from 11th to 16 March. Its members participate in other FCS sponsored activities such as the Sunday soccer, beer tasting night, FCS barbecues, and various trips. One of the popular events is participating in the Annual Gothenburg City Half Marathon. During 90s, members of FCS built the Waterbike hydrofoil Af Chapman II and competed in the Human Powered Boats Championships.
