= Jan-Eric Sundgren =

Swedish engineer (born 1951)

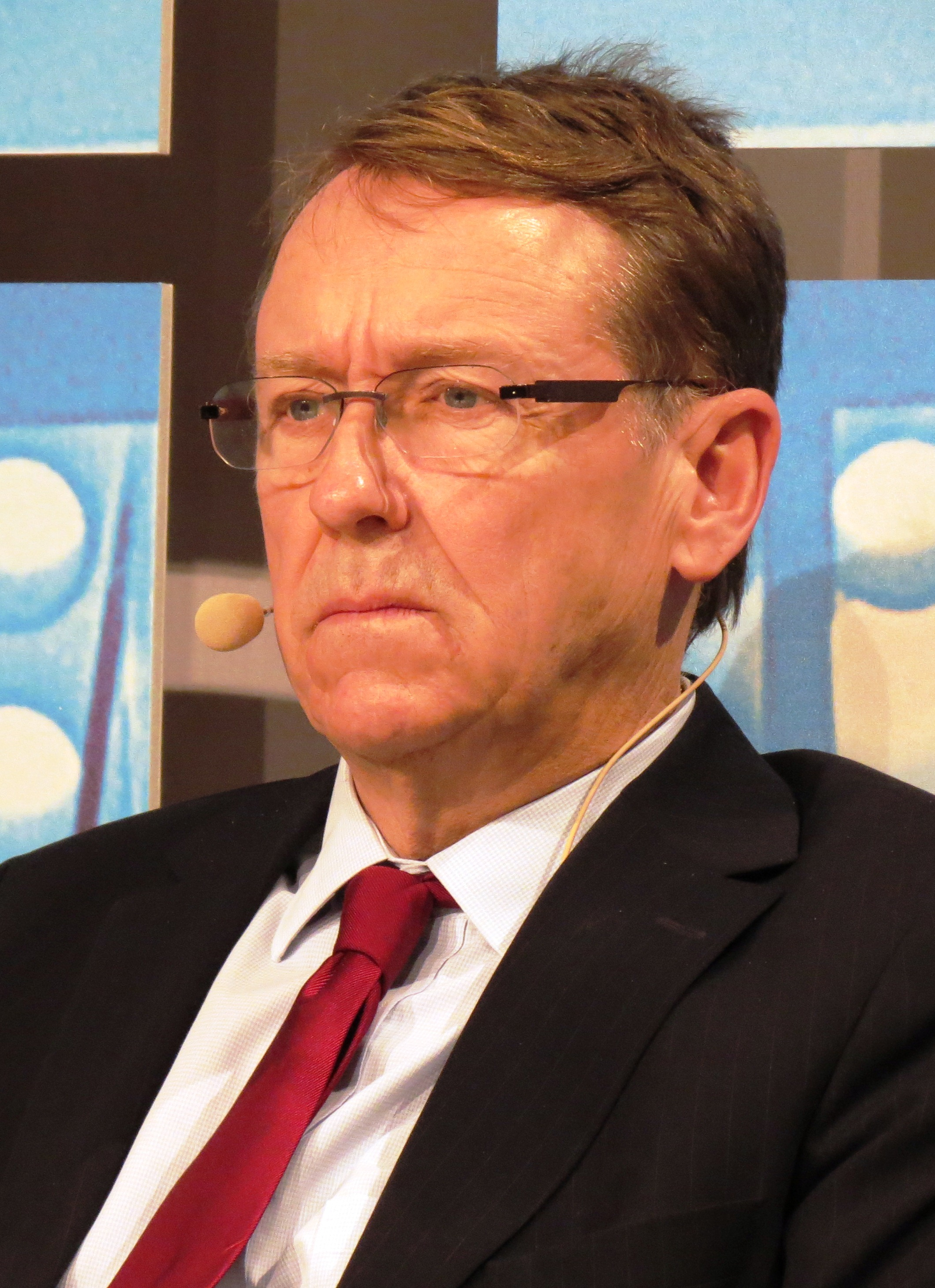
Jan-Eric Sundgren in 2013.

Jan-Eric Sundgren (born 1951), is a Swedish engineer who served as senior vice president at Volvo Group from 2006 until 2013. Prior to that, he was a professor of physics at Linköping University, and served as rector at Chalmers University of Technology from 1998 until 2006.

== Education ==
Sundgren received his M.S. in electrical engineering and applied physics in 1974 from Linköping Institute of Technology. He briefly studied business economics Karlstad University before joining Ericsson in 1975. Sundgren returned to Linköping University in 1977, receiving his doctorate in physics in 1982, with his doctoral advisor being material scientist Stig Hagström.

== Career ==
Between 1985 and 1986, Sundgren did postdoctoral work at the University of Illinois at Urbana-Champaign, United States, before subsequently returning to Linköping University to become a professor of physics in 1990. He was also Vice Praeses of the Royal Swedish Academy of Engineering Sciences.

From 1998 to 2005, Sundgren served as rector of Chalmers University of Technology.

== Awards ==
- Member of the Royal Swedish Academy of Engineering Sciences, 1997.
- John A. Thornton Memorial Award & Lecture, American Vacuum Society, 1995.
