= Stig Hagström =

Swedish scientist (1932–2011)

Stig B. Hagström (1932–2011) was a Professor Emeritus of Materials Science and Engineering at Stanford University.

== Career ==
He was trained at Uppsala University under the Nobel Laureate Kai Siegbahn. He received his B.Sc. (filosofie kandidat) in 1957, his M.Sc. (filosofie magister) in 1958, his licentiate (filosofie licentiat) in 1961 and his Ph.D. in 1964. After a period in 1964–1966 as a researcher at Massachusetts Institute of Technology and Lawrence Berkeley Laboratory, he was appointed university lecturer (universitetslektor) and docent at Chalmers University of Technology in 1966. In 1969 he was appointed as a chaired full professor in Physics and vice chancellor at Linköping Institute of Technology, which was founded the very same year, and which received full university status in 1975 and thus became Linköping University, Sweden's sixth university. Thereafter he moved to Xerox Palo Alto Research Center in California, US. In 1987 he was appointed professor at Stanford University. In 1992–1998 he was the chancellor of the Swedish National Agency for Higher Education.

== Awards ==
- Member of the Royal Swedish Academy of Engineering Sciences (1983)
  - Honorary Member of the Royal Swedish Academy of Engineering Sciences (1999)
- Member of the Royal Swedish Academy of Sciences (1992)
- Member of the Royal Norwegian Society of Sciences and Letters
- Member of Royal Physiographic Society in Lund
- Fellow of the American Physical Society
- Honorary Doctorate in Engineering, Linköping University
- Honorary Doctorate in Engineering, Blekinge Institute of Technology
- Knight of the Order of the Polar Star
- Recipient of the Royal Order of the Seraphim, a Swedish Royal Order of Chivalry created in 1748
- Royal Swedish Medal
- John Ericsson Gold Medal
