= Institute for Analytical Sociology =

Social science research institute in Sweden

The Institute for Analytical Sociology
- Institutet för Analytisk Sociologi
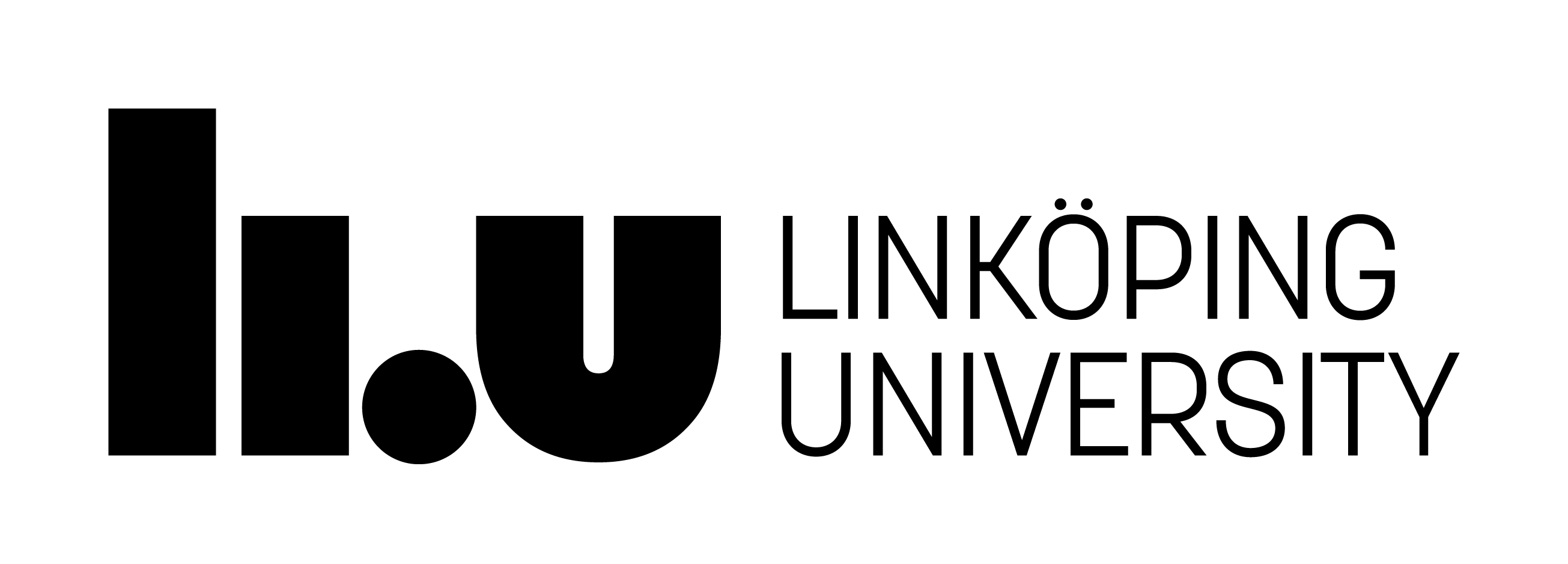
- Established: 2014; 12 years ago
- Laboratory type: Research institute
- Research type: Interdisciplinary social science and computational research
- Director: Maria Brandén
- Staff: > 50
- Students: > 100
- Location: Norrköping, Sweden, Sweden
- Campus: Campus Norrköping
- Operating agency: University of Linköping
- Website: liu.se/en/organisation/liu/iei/ias

The Institute for Analytical Sociology (IAS) is a research institute based in Sweden aiming at deepening the understanding of social, political, and cultural matters. Affiliated with Linköping University, the institute is located at Campus Norrköping and has established itself as a leading center for computational social science and analytical sociology. The Institute for Analytical Sociology was funded in 2014 by Peter Hedström. Its current director is Maria Brandén.

== History ==
Founded in 2014 by Peter Hedström, a leading figure in analytical sociology, the Institute for Analytical Sociology emerged from a growing need to apply advanced computational and analytical methods to understanding social dynamics. Since 2024, the Institute hosts the Swedish excellence center in computational social science, SweCSS, bridging social scientific research with cutting-edge computational techniques.

== Research Areas ==
- Segregation Dynamics
- Cultural Dynamics
- Organizational Dynamics
- Computational Text Analysis
- Social Network Analysis

== Education ==
The Institute for Analytical Sociology offers the Master’s Programme in Computational Social Science (CSS), the first of its kind in Europe.
