= Karlatornet =

Skyscraper in Lindholmen in Gothenburg, Sweden

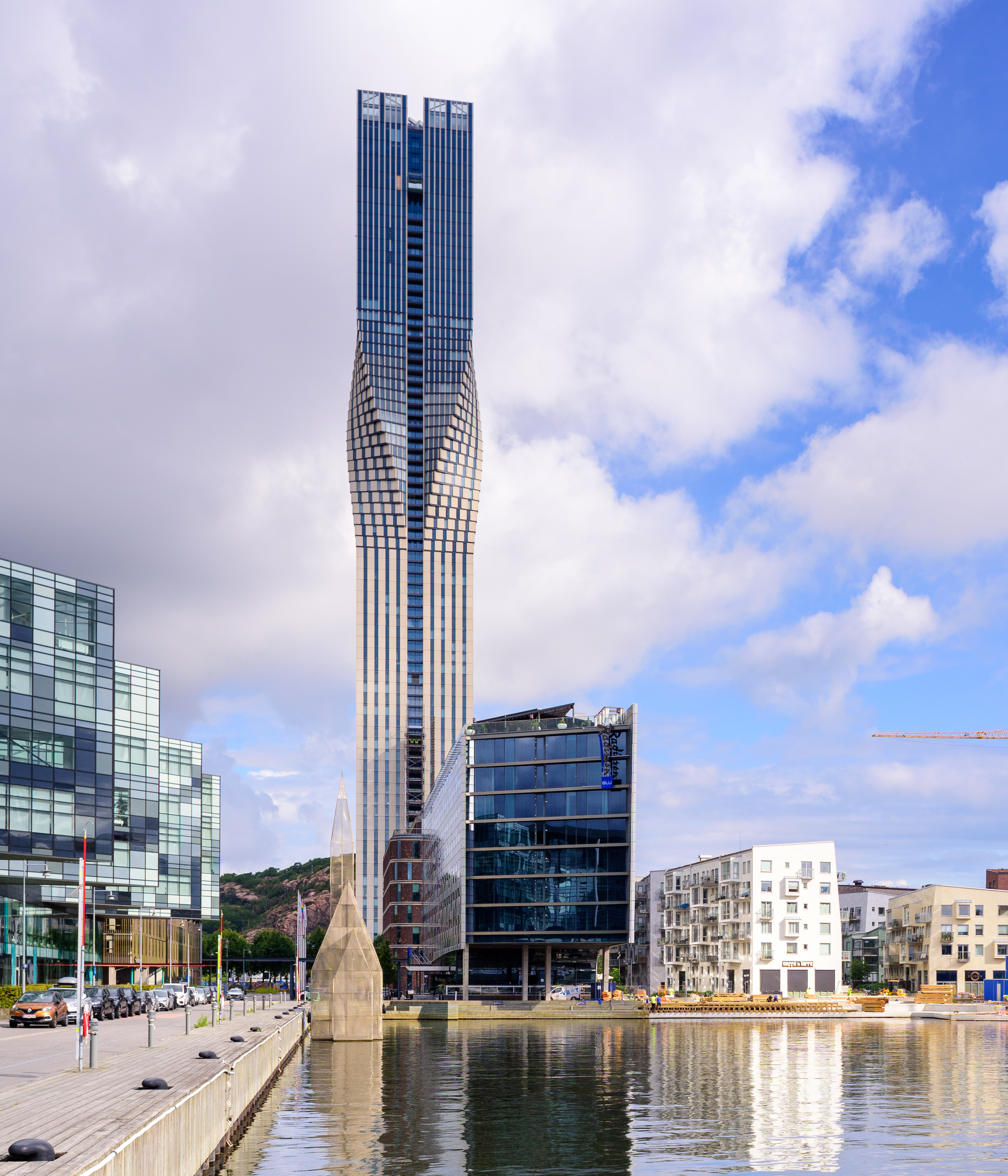
- Interactive map of the Karlatornet area

General information
- Status: Completed
- Type: Residential/Hotel/Office
- Location: Lodjursstråket 1, 417 51, Lindholmen, Gothenburg, Sweden
- Coordinates: 57°42′35″N 11°56′20″E
- Construction started: 2019
- Completed: 2024

Height
- Architectural: 246 m (807 ft)

Technical details
- Floor count: 74

Design and construction
- Architect: Skidmore, Owings and Merrill
- Developer: Serneke Group AB
- Structural engineer: VBK Konsulterande Ingenjörer AB
- Main contractor: Karlastaden Development AB

Website
- Official website 1 Official website 2

Karlatornet (lit. 'The Karla Tower') (briefly known as Polstjärnan or Karlavagnstornet) is a mixed-use skyscraper built by Serneke in Lindholmen in Gothenburg, Sweden. Started in 2019 and topped out in June 2023, the tower stands at 246 m (807 ft) tall with 74 floors, was completed in the autumn of 2024 and is the current tallest building in Sweden.

The building's architecture firm is Skidmore, Owings and Merrill, and it was built by Serneke Group AB. It was finished in 2024, but the first inhabitants started moving in from August 2023. The building reached 246 metres tall (807 ft), and is the tallest building in Scandinavia and in the Nordic countries. On 22 September 2022, the tower reached this milestone at 193 metres, officially surpassing Turning Torso in Malmö.

== Background ==
=== Development ===
In an interview for GT from April 2010, Ola Serneke spoke about his plan to build Karlastaden, several high-rise buildings on Serneke's site in the Lindholmen district of Hisingen. The tallest building was planned to be 35 stories high. In August 2013, detailed plans were presented to build Karlavagnstornet on the site, a 201-meter-high skyscraper with 60 floors for two billion kronor. In an architectural competition, 58 architectural firms submitted entries for Karlatornet and Karlastaden. In May 2014, five proposals were selected for a second round. The winner was the American architectural firm Skidmore, Owings and Merrill – who had previously designed One World Trade Center – with the proposal "Polar Star" with the justification:

An identity-creating proposal that takes a smart holistic approach to both the skyscraper and the urban environment. The proposal integrates the local environment into a whole that provides the opportunity for a vibrant urban environment. The skyscraper's clear identity gives character and vitality to Lindholmen and becomes Gothenburg's new landmark and pride.

— Ola Serneke for Expressen in April 2010.

SOM's proposal for Karlastaden also included several other tall buildings. The plans were developed and the final draft detailed plan included the following tall buildings: Karlatornet (73 floors), Cassiopeja (43 floors), Auriga (36 floors), Virgo (27 floors), Lynx (17 floors) and Capella (17 floors). The area was proposed to include rental and condominium apartments, senior housing, hotels, offices, preschools, a health center, retail, restaurants and a cultural center.

The detailed plan for Karlastaden was approved by the Gothenburg Building Committee in May 2017. The City Council gave the go-ahead a month later.

=== Appeals ===
The decision to approve the detailed plan for Karlastaden was appealed to the County Administrative Board. The County Administrative Board pointed out that the detailed plan for the building could not be accepted as it was considered to lack supporting documents. The County Administrative Board also argued that the plans risked harming national interests and that the development could be unsuitable for people's health and safety. In addition, several appeals were made. This delayed the construction process.

After the agreements and declarations of intent requested by the County Administrative Board were received, the decision of the Municipality of Gothenburg regarding Karlastaden was submitted for review. The County Administrative Board accepted the detailed plan on the grounds that the County Administrative Board “no longer fears that there is a risk of significant damage to the national interest in communications or that the implementation of development according to the plan will be inappropriate with regard to human health and safety. The County Administrative Board therefore decides not to cancel the plan”. The detailed plan was approved by the County Administrative Board on 27 September 2017. In November 2017, the Land and Environmental Court rejected the appeals. In December 2017, the detailed plan became legally binding.

== Project ==
=== Construction ===
Construction began in 2018 but stalled in 2019, a delay that led to apartment buyers threatening to cancel their contracts with Serneke. On 16 December 2019, Dagens Nyheter reported that Serneke "hopes to complete the deal around Karlatornet before the new year", after previously estimating that the deal could be presented in the third quarter. According to Serneke, the reason for the delay is the size of the deal, and that "it is a large international player that we are dealing with, and then you have to respect the processes, which are quite extensive".

On 16 January 2020, Dagens Nyheter reported that Serneke intended to sell 80% of Karlatornet to Oaktree Capital Management. However, the deal was postponed due to the corona pandemic and construction was at a standstill until Serneke decided to pause construction. However, construction of the rest of Karlastaden continued in the meantime. In connection with this, Johan Live, Head of Communications at Serneke, announced that Karlatornet would be ready for occupancy in the latter part of 2022.

Construction of Karlatornet resumed on December 18, 2020, when the real estate company Balder was presented as a new co-financier, and occupancy was expected in 2023.

On September 22, 2022, Karlatornet, with its 193 meters, became the tallest building in the Nordic region, thus taking over the lead from Turning Torso in Malmö. During the summer of 2023, Karlatornet reached its full height, and on August 22 of that year the first households were given access to their apartments, and in 2024 the tower's exterior was completed.

Karlatornet has 5 elevators engineered by Finnish elevator maker Kone. Two of the elevators have a maximum speed of 6 m/s and the remaining three top out at 8 m/s. At the time of construction, these were the fastest elevators in Sweden.

=== Cost ===
In an early stage the building was budgeted to cost about 4 billion Swedish kronor but, after many changes including increased height, final cost totalled 5,8 billion Swedish kronor or 525 million USD (currency exchange rate at that time).

=== Hotel ===
Karlatornet houses a Strawberry hotel in an adjacent building with 300 guestrooms and multiple conference areas, restaurants, gyms and a spa. The total hotel area is 17,500 square metres (188,000 sq ft).

== Karlastaden ==
Karlatornet is one out of 9 buildings that will form Karlastaden (lit. Karla City). Other buildings are:

- Cassiopeja, 147 m (482 ft) 43 floors
- Auriga, 125 m (410 ft) 36 floors
- Virgo, 27 floors
- Capella, 17 floors
- Lynx, 17 floors
- Aries, 12 floors
- Callisto, 7 floors

Karlatornet with surrounding buildings is called Karlastaden (literal translation: Karlacity). The total area of Karlastaden is 270,000 square metres (2,900,000 sq ft). It houses apartments, schools, gyms, higher education institutions, hotels, offices, restaurants and healthcare clinics.

== Construction site chronology ==
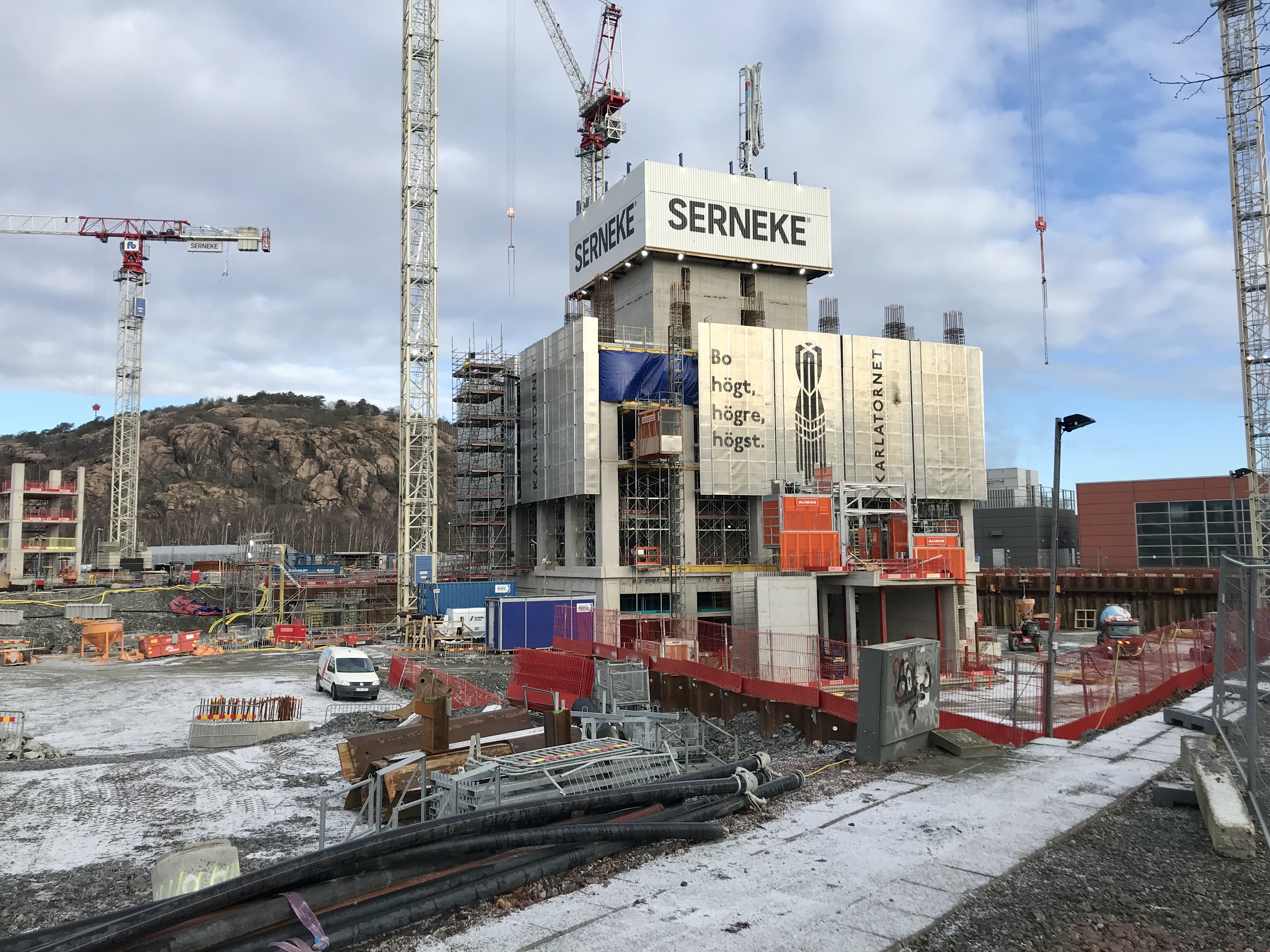
March 2020

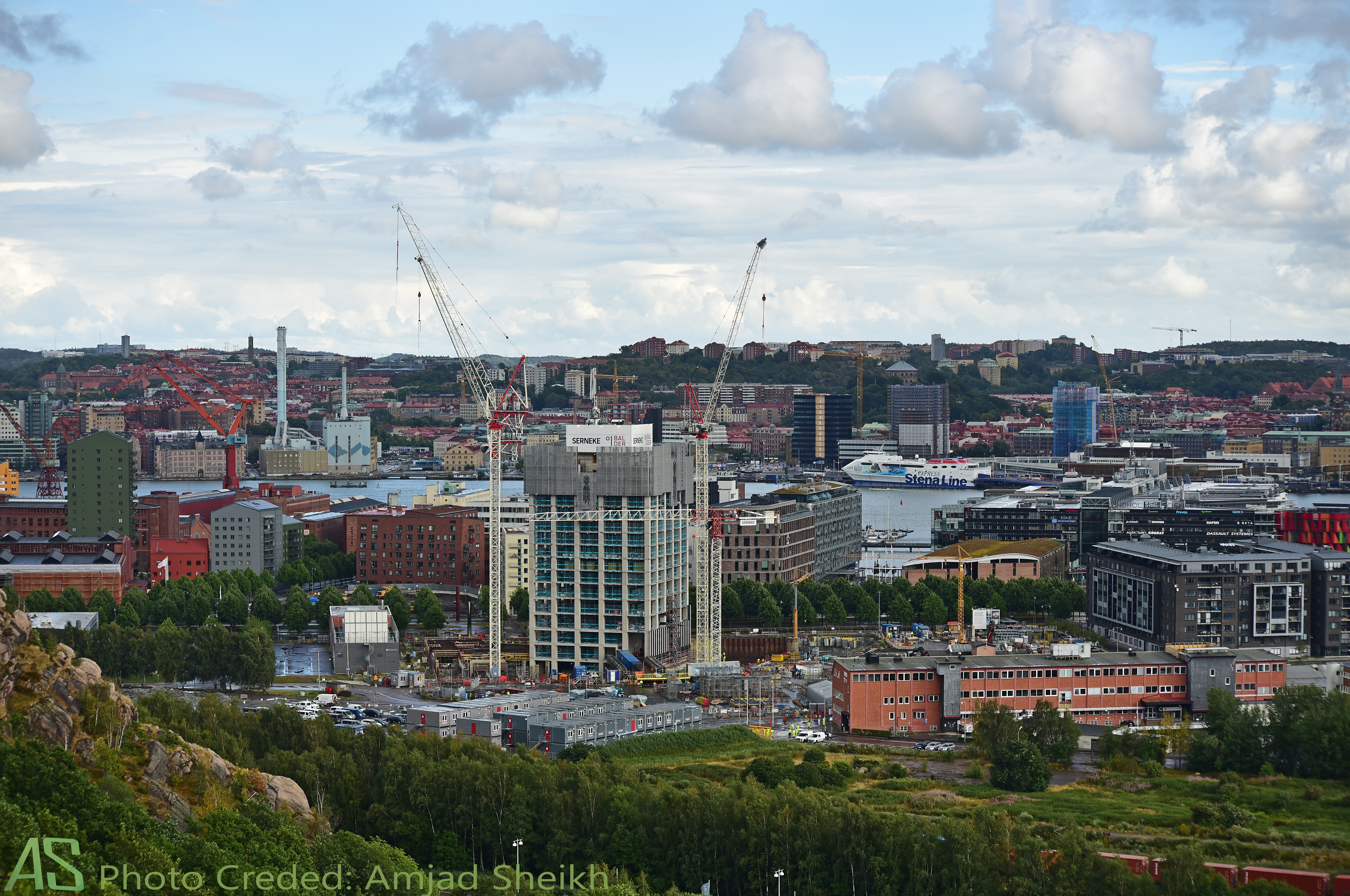
July 2021

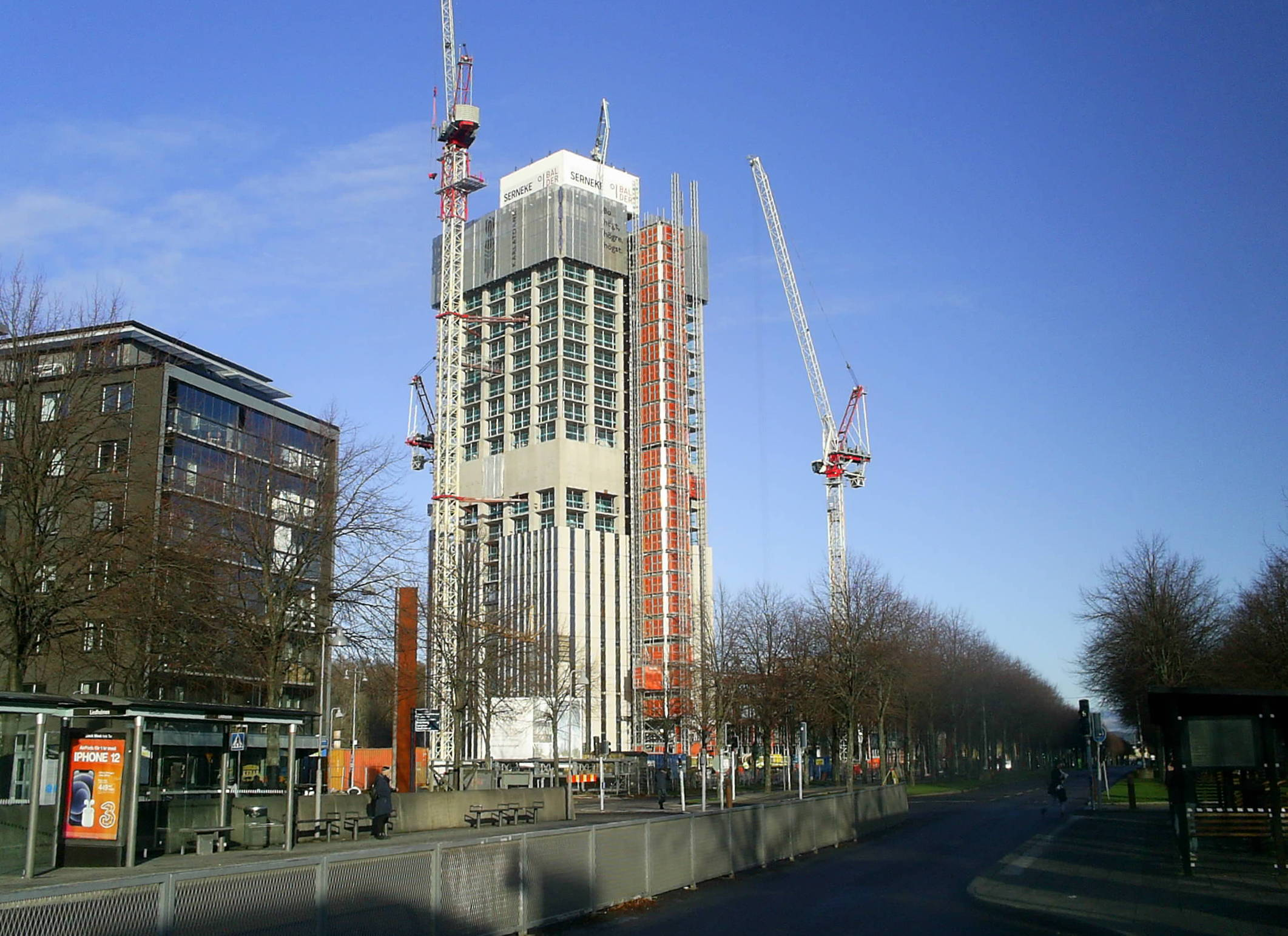
November 2021

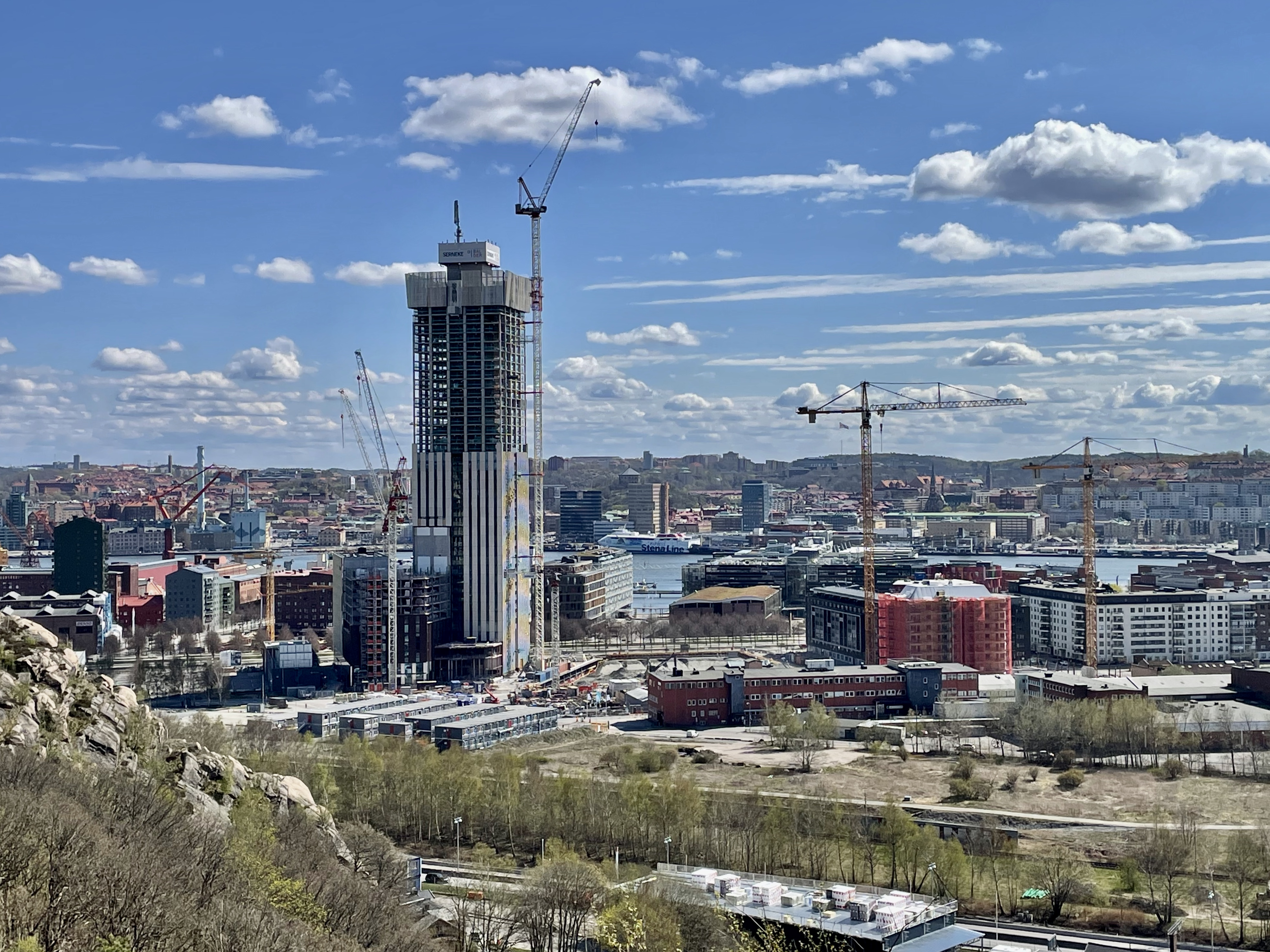
April 2022 seen from the Ramberget

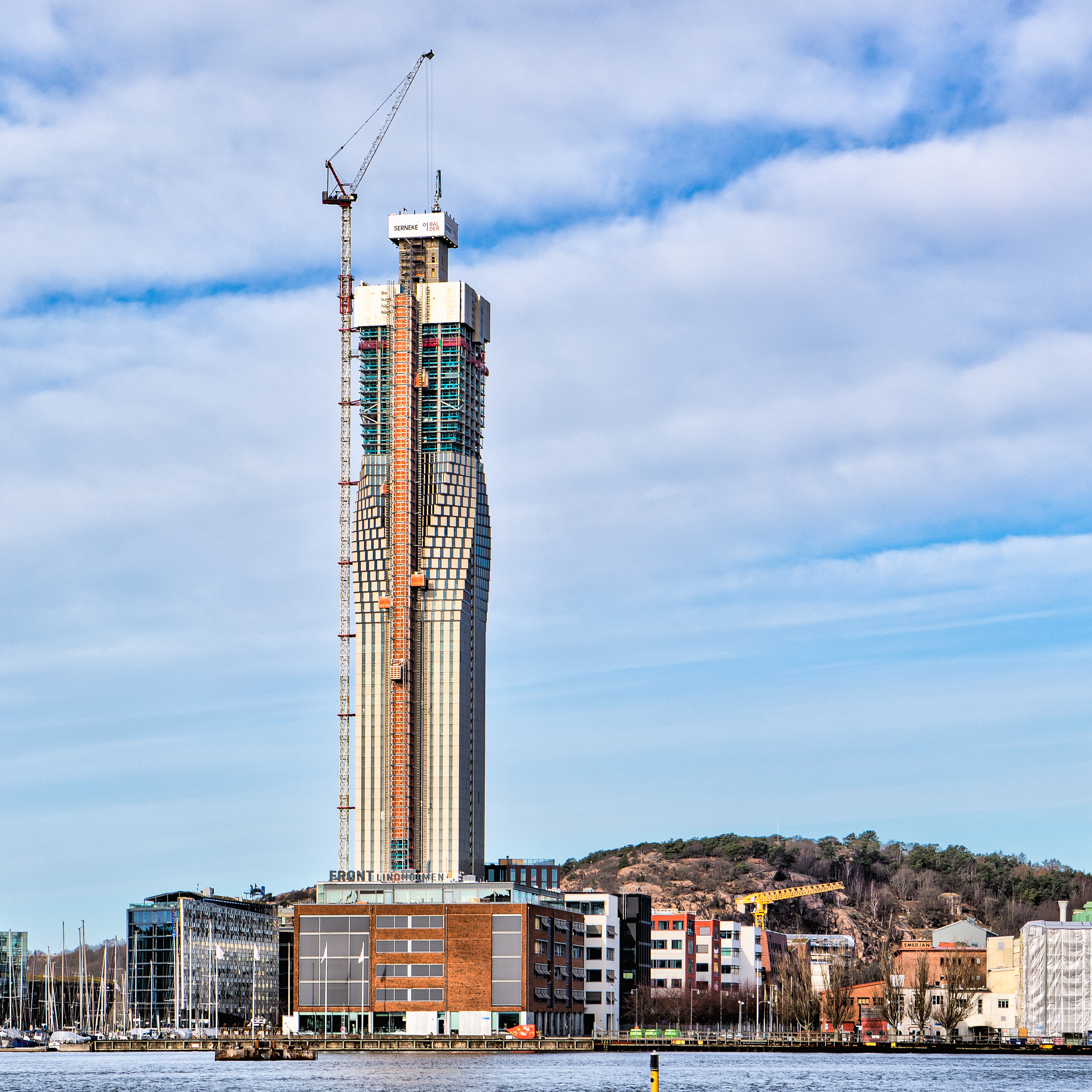
February 2023

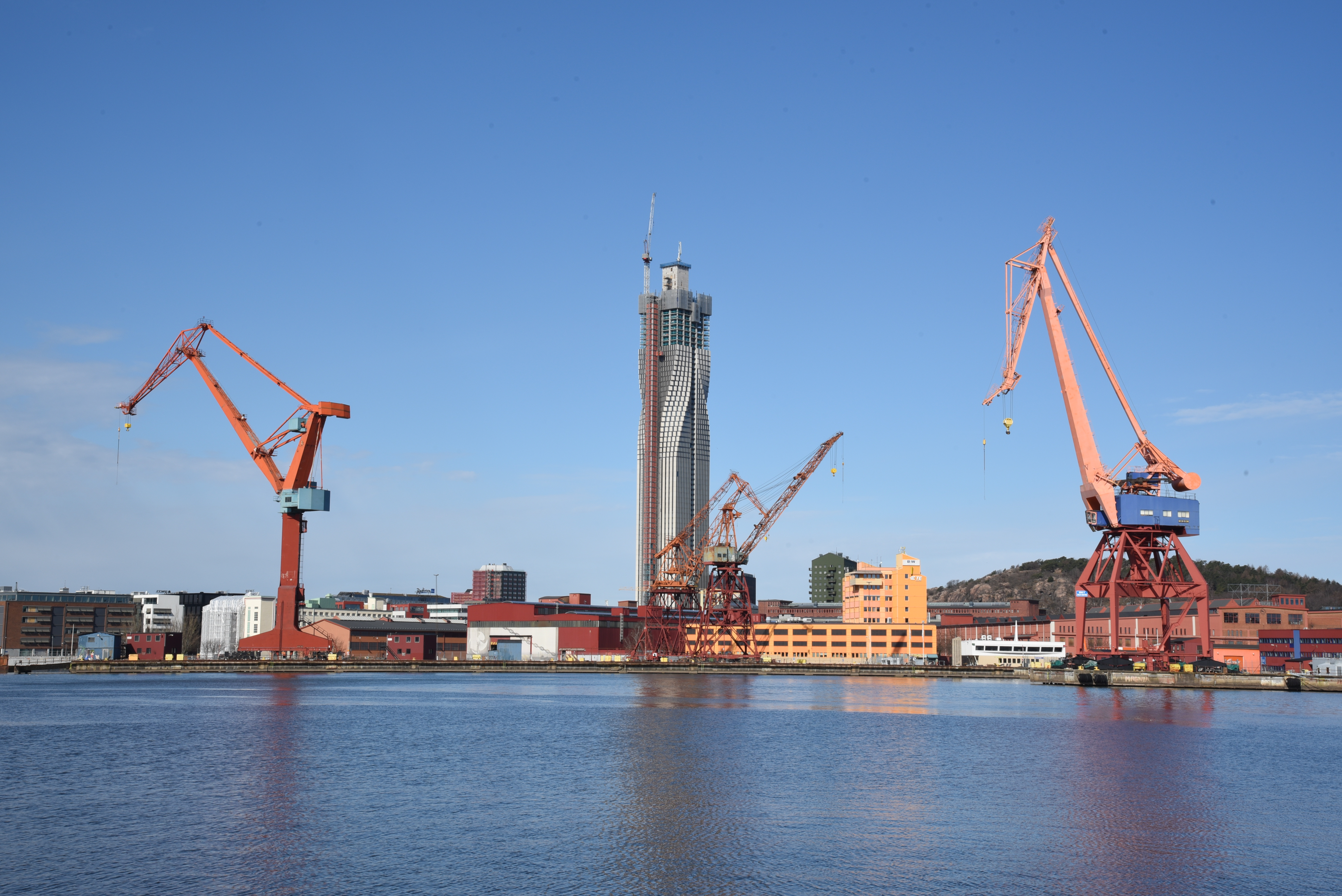
April 2023

== See also ==
- List of tallest buildings in Sweden
- List of tallest buildings in Scandinavia
- List of tallest buildings in the European Union

Records
Preceded by Turning Torso	Tallest building in Sweden; 2024–present 246 metres (807 ft)	Incumbent
