= European Network for Training and Research in Electrical Engineering =

Exchange programs for Electrical Engineering students between 18 universities in Europe. It is also known as Entree. Their members are:

- Chalmers Lindholmen University College (Sweden)
- University of Aalborg (Denmark)
- Heriot-Watt University (United Kingdom)
- Brunel University (United Kingdom)
- Delft University of Technology (Netherlands)
- Université libre de Bruxelles (Belgium)
- Technische Universität Dresden (Germany)
- Karlsruhe Institute of Technology (Germany)
- École Supérieure d'Ingénieurs en Électronique et Électrotechnique Paris (France)
- École Supérieure d'Ingénieurs en Électronique et Électrotechnique Amiens (France)
- École polytechnique fédérale de Lausanne (Switzerland)
- Brno University of Technology (Czech Republic)
- National Technical University of Athens (Greece)
- Politecnico di Milano (Italy)
- Pontifical Comillas University of Madrid (Spain)
- University of Valladolid (Spain)
- Institut Méditerranéen de Technologie (France)
- Politecnico di Torino (Italy)
