= Valborgskalaset =

Valborgskalaset (Swedish for Walpurgis Night party) is, according to its host FestU, Sweden's biggest party. It takes place on Chalmers on 30 April every year in the Chalmers student union building, to celebrate Walpurgis Night. The party usually have 11 to 12 bars serving drinks, 8 dancefloors and a scene with live performances. Famous artists such as The Sounds, Petter, Movits!, Den svenska björnstammen, Maskinen, Melody Club, Sahara Hotnights, Kapten Röd and Johnossi have performed live on stage.

The party often features a lot of different "toys" like bouncy castles (the Festu Fraternity have their own purple bouncy castle), rodeo-bull, sumo-suit-fighting and a pretty amazing laser show.

The legal age of entering the party is 18 years of age, and the extremely popular tickets are almost always sold out in less than an hour. As a result of this FestU always have a limit each year on how many tickets a single person can buy varying from 5-8. The students building The Cortège is garantued a ticket to the Party.
