= Stefan Bengtsson =

Stefan Bengtsson can refer to:

- Stefan Bengtsson (engineer) (born 1961), Swedish engineer and professor
- Stefan Bengtsson (1954–2010), Swedish sailor
- Stefan Bengtson (1947–2024), Swedish paleozoologist
