= Ola Serneke =

Hungarian-Swedish businessman (born 1971)

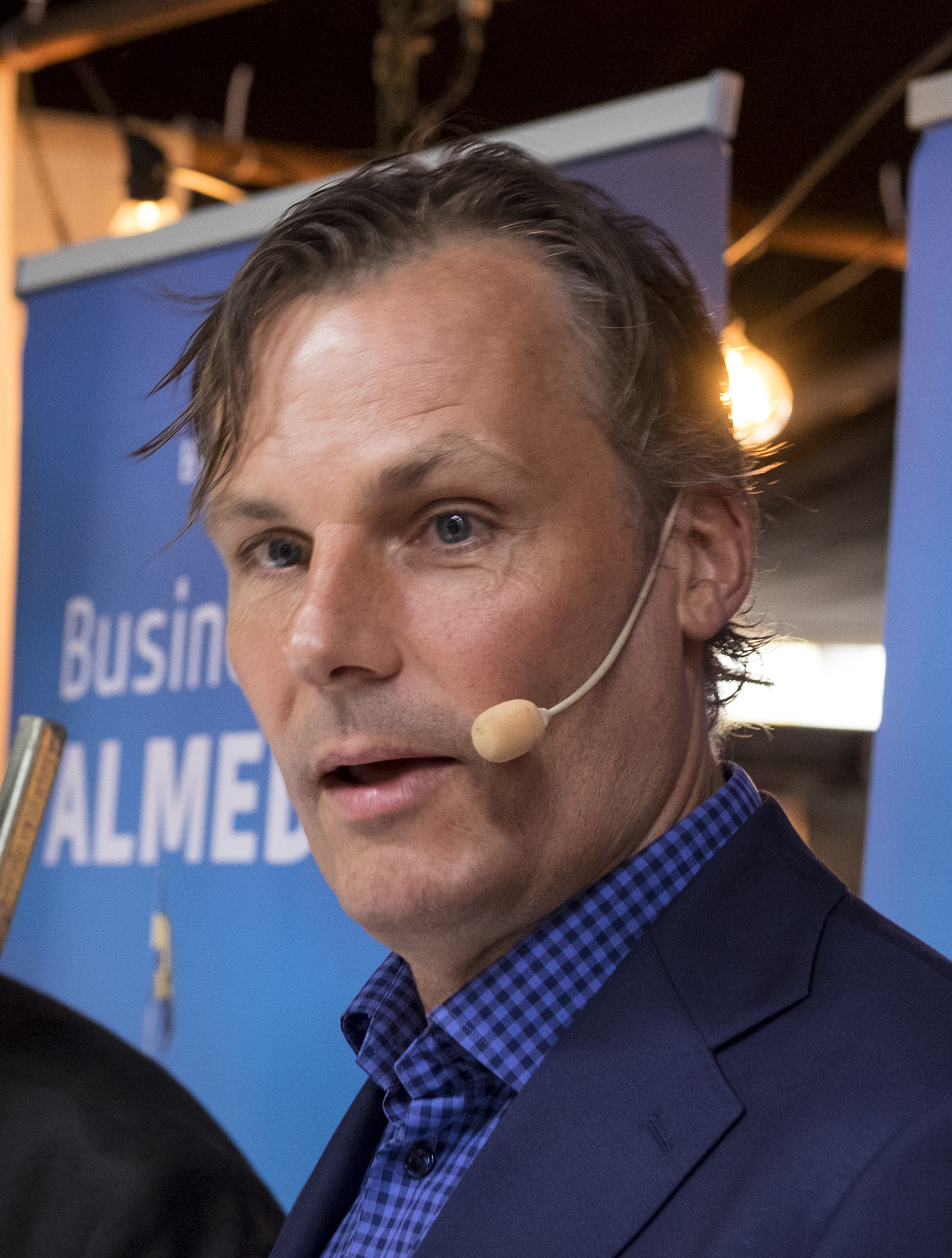
- Serneke during Almedalen Week in July 2017
- Born: Ola Kristian Serneke; 16 November 1971 (age 54); Alingsås, Älvsborg County, Sweden
- Education: Chalmers University of Technology
- Occupations: Businessman, manager
- Title: Former CEO, Serneke
- Successor: Daniel Åstenius
- Spouse: Joanna Liszowska (m. 2010; div. 2018)
- Children: 1

Ola Kristian Serneke (born 16 November 1971) is a Swedish businessman and entrepreneur. He is the owner and former CEO of the construction company Serneke and the driving force behind the project of the Karlatornet skyscraper.

== Career ==
Serneke holds a degree in economics and a degree in engineering from Chalmers University of Technology.

In 2017, he was named "CEO of the Year for large companies". In 2019, he appeared on the radio program Sommar i P1. The following year, in 2020, it was revealed that Serneke, under the pseudonym "Pellucidum", had commented on his listed company in at least 200 posts on the stock forum Placera.nu. He tried to boost the company under the pretext that he was an ordinary investor who thought the company was undervalued. His actions are called "embarrassing and laughable" by Dagens industri's economic commentator. On 24 February 2021, Serneke resigned as CEO and President of Serneke Group, and left his position as a member of the board of the company as a result of the internet posts. At the same time, the Swedish Economic Crime Authority dropped the preliminary investigation against him as it was assessed that his actions were not considered criminal. He is also the incumbent CEO of Serneke Invest.

In 2023, he was awarded the Key to Gothenburg. The award was presented by Business Region Chairman Mattias Jonsson.
