= CETAC =

Chalmers Engineering Trainee Appointment Committee (CETAC) is a student group located at Chalmers University of Technology in Gothenburg, Sweden. The sole purpose of the organisation is to bring American companies and Swedish students together. Each summer, CETAC members go to North America to gain practical experience in their particular field of study.

CETAC was founded in 1966 and has since then sent approximately 10-20 students every year to United States and Canada. CETAC is only open for students studying Computer Science & Engineering, Electrical Engineering, Engineering Physics, Engineering Mathematics or Software Engineering.

CETAC helps their members with practical details such as insurances, visas, etc. with the support by the American-Scandinavian Foundation.

Since May 1, 2006, CETAC has an alumni organization called CETAC Alumni
