= UNITECH International =

European university alliance

UNITECH International Society
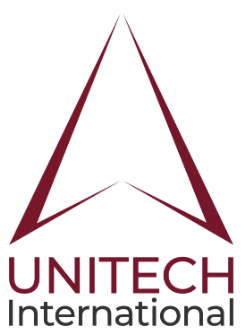
- Formation: 1999
- Founded at: Zurich, Switzerland
- Type: Educational
- Legal status: Active
- Location: Zurich, Switzerland
- President: Torbjorn Lundh
- Website: www.unitech-international.org

UNITECH International is a leadership development program for talented STEM students run by a society of distinguished technical universities and multinational companies across Europe.

== History ==
UNITECH was founded in 1999 by ETH Zürich's former rector Konrad Osterwalder and Hilti's former CEO Pius Baschera.

After 23 years, the UNITECH network has more than 1'500 alumni from 12 different universities, and 64 multinational corporate firms have been a part of this network. As of 2023, the network comprises eight European universities and 15 corporate partners across Europe.

== Partner universities ==
The universities are to guarantee academic excellence and have committed themselves to build a network with UNITECH International, which goes beyond traditional programs.

- Chalmers University, Sweden
- ETH Zurich, Switzerland
- Politecnico di Milano, Italy
- RWTH Aachen, Germany
- Loughborough University, United Kingdom
- Trinity College Dublin, Ireland
- Polytechnic University of Catalonia, Spain
- Institut national des sciences appliquées de Lyon, France

== Corporate partners ==
The participating companies are not only seen as sponsors but as active partners who take on a role in the training and further development of the students. According to UNITECH International, the partners should fulfill a demanding profile in terms of international presence and market position.

- ABB Group
- Accelleron
- Airbus
- Buhler Group
- Danfoss
- Evonik Industries
- Geberit
- Hilti
- Infineon Technologies
- IWC Schaffhausen
- Nouryon
- Roche Diagnostics
- Wella Company

Former industrial partners include bioMérieux, Caterpillar, Covestro, Lonza, Nokia and ZF Friedrichshafen.
