= Marianne Kärrholm =

Swedish chemical engineer and academic

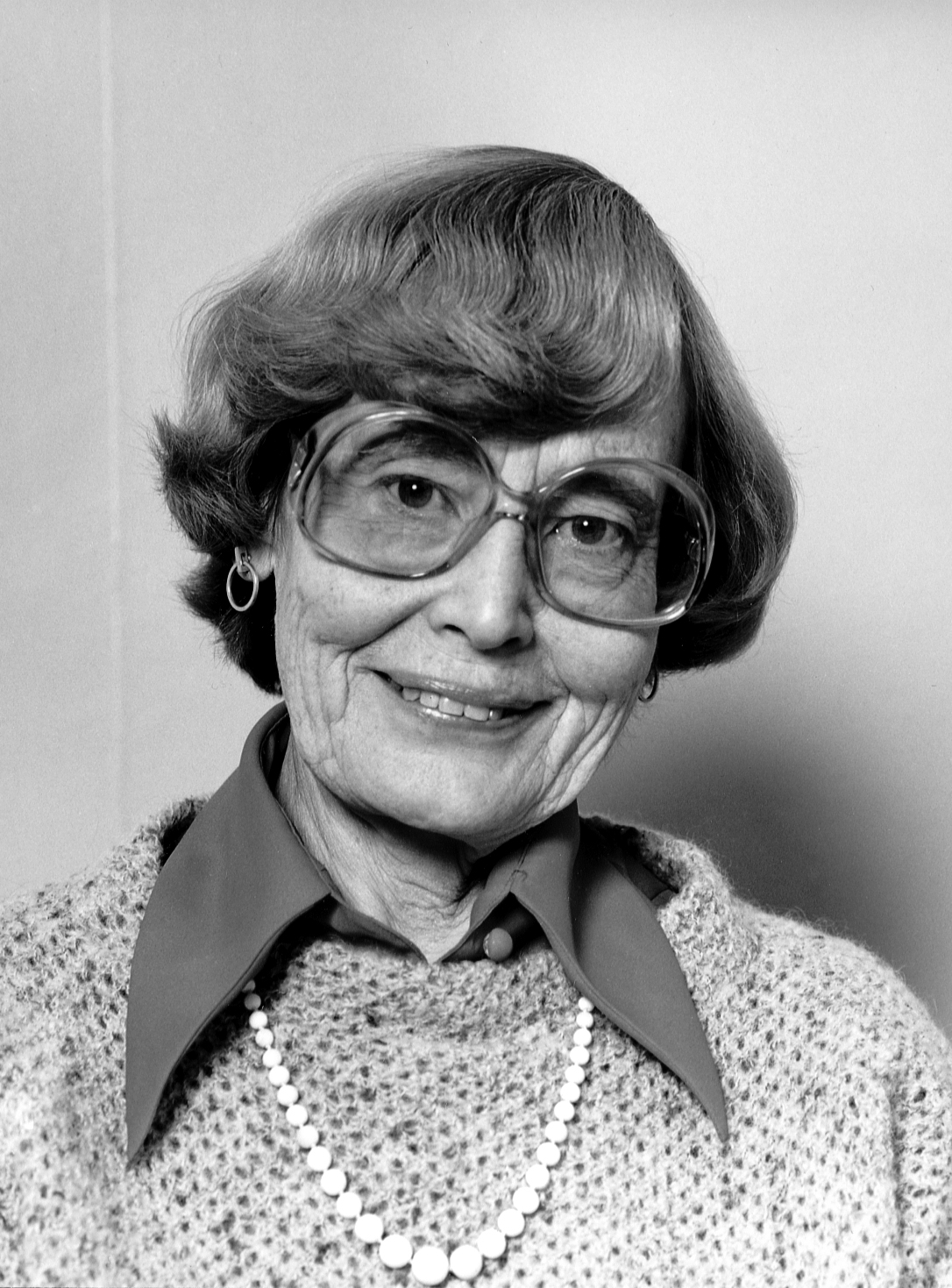
- Born: 22 December 1921; Helsinki
- Died: 21 January 2018 (aged 96); Gothenburg
- Citizenship: Swedish
- Occupation(s): chemical engineer, educator

Ebba Marianne Kärrholm née Hellsten (22 December 1921 – 21 January 2018) was a Swedish chemical engineer and educator. Conducting research from 1945 at the Swedish Textile Research Institute at Chalmers University of Technology in Gothenburg, she collaborated with textile companies. The year 1971 saw publication of a major study she coordinated for the Swedish Consumer Council on consumer-oriented technology, which was also published in English. After earning a Ph.D. in 1960, she became the first woman to be appointed senior lecturer at Chalmers. She became professor of the university's newly established Consumer Technology Department in 1984 until her retirement in 1989. The following year, she was awarded the Chalmers' Medal.

== Early life, family and education ==
Born in Helsinki, Finland, on 22 December 1921, Ebba Marianne Hellsten was the daughter of Karl Fabian Hellsten and his wife Märte Elisabet née Lindhe. In 1936, she moved with her mother, her mother's second husband, and her brother Martin to Malmö, Sweden, where she attended secondary school. After the family moved to Gothenburg she matriculated from the girl's grammar school in 1940. From 1941, she studied at Chalmers University, where she graduated as a civil engineer in 1945. The following year she married fellow engineer Nils Gunnar Kärrholm (1919–2006) with whom she had three children: Helena, Johan and Pia. In 1960, with a thesis titled Solvent-assisted dyeing of wool she earned a Ph.D. from Chalmers.

== Career ==
During her studies, Kärrholm had come into contact with various local industrial companies. In 1945, she was employed as a researcher by the Swedish Textile Institute (TEFO) which was located at Chalmers. She collaborated with textile companies in Borås and Norrköping investigating aspects of textile production and publishing reports.

On earning her doctorate in 1960, she was appointed a senior lecturer at Chalmers where she continued to undertake research on consumer issues, backed by her membership of the Swedish Consumer Council (1959–1972) and of Sveriges standardiseringsförbund, the Swedish standards body, (1975–1988). She collaborated closely with Statens institut för konsumentfrågor, the Swedish institute for consumer affairs, known from 1973 as Konsumentverket or Sweden's Consumer Agency. Kärrholm was appointed head of its research department which was established in Gothenburg.

Kärrholm coordinated a major study on the need for consumer-based research which in 1971 was published in Swedish as Konsumentteknik: konsumentinriktad forskning på livsmedel, kläder, bostad, fritid- The following year it was published in English as Technical research based on consumers' needs, demands and wishes. In 1984, Kärrholm was promoted to professor of Chalmers' newly established Consumer Technology Department, so becoming the university's first female professor. She maintained the post until her retirement in 1989. In 1998, The Royal Swedish Academy of Engineering Sciences' Gold Medal "for contributions to the establishment of consumer technology, i.e. a design of technical products adapted to user requirements".

Marianne Kärrholm died in Gothenburg on 21 January 2018 and was buried in Marieberg Cemetery.
