= Sonic Movement =

- Mission statement: The age of the electric car deserves its own sound
- Commercial?: Yes
- Type of project: Company division
- Owner: Semcon
- Founder: James Brooks, Fernando Ocaña
- Established: 10 September 2013
- Funding: Semcon
- Status: Active
- Website: sonic-movement.com

Sonic Movement is a research project operated by the Swedish company Semcon. Premiered in September 2013, Sonic Movement proposes an "adaptive" system of warning sounds and noises for electric cars, which is in opposition to industry trend of replicating combustion engine noises for electric car sound effects.

Founders James Brooks and Fernando Ocaña are on the design team, as well as artists Holly Herndon and Matt Dryhurst. The project aims to meet a proposal for a US mandate which would require silent electric and hybrid vehicles to emit warning sounds, as well as legislation passed by the European Parliament in April 2014, which states that all new electric cars sold in the EU must emit noise by 2019. However, Ocaña notes that while legislators are "looking at this from a technical point of view, [Sonic Movement is] looking at it from a user experience point of view."

== History ==
=== Founding ===
Sonic Movement is a research project headed by a group of designers, artists and musicians that advocates a new approach to the sound of electric vehicles. According to Car Design News, "The Sonic Movement manifesto states that 'the dawn of electric and hybrid travel allows us to fantasize on what the future of our city streets could sound like.'"

Designer James Brooks had the initial concept, after testing a number of electric cars and finding their warning sounds underwhelming. In early 2013, Brooks contacted Fernando Ocaña, who was a fellow alumni of the Royal College of Art Vehicle Design in London and creative director of the Swedish technology firm Semcon. Car Design News stated that "Brooks and Ocaña have shaped the project with their unconventional attitude towards car design...the architectural shape of Ocaña's final RCA project, 'Monoform,' encouraged us to view our environment from an all-important new perspective, while the 'BOX,' a joint project by Brooks and RCA student Richard Bone, was an innovative new take on urban car sharing."

Brooks then brought in American musician and sound artist Holly Herndon, who in turn introduced them to artist and "technologist" Matt Dryhurst. According to Car Design News, the project incorporates "Herndon’s work in exploring the intersection between people and technology, and Dryhurst's focus on the blurred edges between art and technology."

=== Semcon involvement ===
The project, dubbed Sonic Movement, gained backing from the engineering firm Semcon in late 2013. Semcon "has been developing solutions for the automotive, life science, telecommunications, energy and development-intensive industries" since the late 1980s, "blending engineering services with design for various products." Among Semcon's other projects are making cars more efficient.

Sonic Movement is funded under the auspice of Semcon's Research and Innovation Lab, specifically their Design and Acoustics divisions. Acoustics expert Jonas Klein and sound engineer Peter Mohlin, both from Semcon, soon began contributing to the project's early development.

=== Frankfurt Motor Show, legislation ===
An installation for the project was premiered at the 2013 Frankfurt Motor Show (IAA) on September 10, and it was launched the same day online. Both live and online, the team presented their concepts using pre-recorded and gathered sound elements to communicate the action of an electric vehicle, using both editorial and artistic content. As of October 2013, the group is creating prototypes of the necessary sound equipment.

The project aims to meet a proposal for a US mandate which would require all US vehicles that drive below a certain decibel level to also emit warning sounds. In April 2014, the European Parliament passed legislation that by 2019, all new electric cars sold in the EU had to emit noise via a device to make them audible to pedestrians. However, despite the ruling's relevant nature to the project, Ocaña notes that legislators were "looking at this from a technical point of view, whereas [Sonic Movement is] looking at it from a user experience point of view."

Pan European Networks stated in August 2014 that the company had shifted "into an intensive research and development phase."

== Project features ==
=== Sound qualities ===
""Our cities have developed but the sonic landscape remains primitive and disordered. [Most car companies] tend to be heavily imprisoned in the old age of the motor car [for EV sound effects] – the stereotypical roaring engines, the depiction of speed, of aggression. Some car companies are even looking at fake Ferrari engine notes."
— Ocana

The Sonic Movement project is a proposal for creating a new system of warning sounds and noises for electric cars, which is in opposition to the industry trend of replicating non-electric car noises such as combustion engines. Ocana has stated that “We need to influence the legislation so as not to live in a world of fake engine sounds and find a suitable humanistic sound so that the car is no longer the villain.” On July 2, 2014 Electric and Hybrid Vehicle Technology International stated that the program "believes that despite the rapid and big advances in electric powertrain technology, the sonic landscape is somewhat primitive and disordered, and there’s a need for a new soundtrack to usher in the new era of sustainable transportation. " Also,

On July 2, 2014 Electric and Hybrid Vehicle Technology International stated "the group is mapping a hierarchy of environmental aspects that the vehicle can sense and gather data on, and to which it can intelligently adapt."

According to the company's design, "cloud-based data will enable the EV to react intelligently to other road users," for example picking up on weather or nearby schools. This information, along with internal data such as movement, are fed into the Sonic Movement Control Unit, or SMCU, which "control the sound modulation in accordance with pre-set legislative, psychoacoustic and car and city brandings." this allows car manufacturers to tailor noises to their brand or city.

=== Hardware and software ===
Beyond aesthetics, the group has stated that the project is focused on allowing the car to be responsive to the environment around it, using sensors and software. With one proposition, sensors and microphones on the cars would capture surrounding noise, then use software programs to reprocess the sound and send it back out via speakers mounted outside the vehicle, in a composed layering of sound.

Ultimately, as of August 2014 the projects plans to integrate "vehicle-based sensors and cloud-based services, including microphones, cameras, ultrasonic radar technology, online mapping, GPS, vehicle-to-vehicle (V2V) as well as vehicle-to-infrastructure (V2I) communication."

As of August 2014 the program's setup uses five loudspeaker drivers. With V2V technology, cars will purportedly also be able to communicate with one another, and may be able to avoid "stacking" similar noises, which can confuse pedestrians. The company is also exploring vehicle-to-mobile phone applications, to help warn pedestrians with headphones on.

=== 3D sound ===
Sound designer Peter Mohlin has attempted to use sound three-dimensionally, providing noises for when a car changes speeds, changes direction or turns on or off, with Herndon quoting that, “In a way, we’ve transformed the steering wheel into a kind of musical controller." According to CD News, "Instead of current two dimensional sound – when a car is near or far away, or when it accelerates or decelerates – they have attempted to make sounds three dimensional to indicate what the car is doing more naturally." For example, as the car accelerates the noise rotates around the car at an increasing rate, eventually cutting as wind and tire noise reach a sufficient decibel level.

While the car is idling, it emits a "bassy rumble" using speakers mounted in each of the car's four corners, and the sound adapts to the ambient noise it detects so it can always be heard. The group calls the idle noise the project's "core" sound.

=== Sound elements ===
A number of the sound elements originate with composer Holly Herndon, who wanted to make sure that the sounds "were not 'completely foreign to people, but that it had a new aesthetic.'" Dryhurst has also contributed to the compositions. James Brooks of Sonic Movement has stated that the noises of an electric car "shouldn't be too complex; it should be almost second nature when you hear it." There is also an effort to make separate cars harmonize together, creating a symphonic effect. Sound designer Peter Mohlin has been involved with this aspect as well.

== See also ==
- Semcon
- Electric vehicle warning sounds
