= Marie Rådbo =

Swedish astronomer (born 1946)

Elsa Marie Rådbo, born 19 June 1946 in Stockholm, is a Swedish astronomer. In 1973, she started working as an astronomer at the Chalmers University of Technology in Gothenburg and is currently employed at the University of Gothenburg. She has published several popular science books in her subject area targeted at children, adolescents and adults.

In 2003, she received the "public educator of year" award for her dedicated work disseminating knowledge about the work methods and results of science."

Rådbo was a speaker in Sweden's radio P1 on 29 July 2005. In 2014 she was a participant on the Genikampen, a TV-program with bright people.

== Awards ==
- Rosén Prize 1998
- The Year's Educator 2003
- Gothenburg förtjänsttecken award, 2004
- Honorary doctorate at Chalmers University of Technology 2005
- Getinge's Culture and Science Prize, 2007
- Astronomical Youth Honorary Scholarship, 2014

== Bibliography ==
- Solsystemet, 1990 (2:a omarbetade upplagan 1993)
- Frågor & svar om rymden, 1990
- Är universum oändligt?, 1992
- Människan i rymden, 1992
- Universumboken, 1993, 1995, 1998, 2002, 2007, 2010
- Stjärnor, planeter och allt vad de heter, 1993
- Science for kids, 1996
- Rymdens gåtor, 1996, 1998, 2025
- Från solgudar till svarta hål - en rymdhistoria (tillsammans med Lennart Eng), 1996 (2:a upplagan 1999)
- Runt i rymden - till alla frågvisa, 1998
- Fakta om solsystemet, 2001
- Ut i rymden - bland kometer, stjärnor och planeter, 2003
- Härifrån till oändligheten - fakta och funderingar om rymden, 2003
- Ögon känsliga för stjärnor, 2008
- Finns det liv i rymden?, 2012
- Stjärnhimlen: bortom gatlyktor och neonljus, 2015
