= Chalmers School of Entrepreneurship =

School

Coordinates: 57.69306555050574°N 11.975306442980726°E

Chalmers School of Entrepreneurship, CSE, is an educational platform encompassing a Master’s Program and a pre-incubator. The Master's Program started 1997 and is a collaboration between Chalmers University of Technology and University of Gothenburg and has graduated over 200 students and the pre-incubator has helped create 27 technology companies.

== See also ==
- Center for Intellectual Property Studies (CIP)
- Gothenburg International Bioscience Business School (GIBBS)
