= Center for Sustainable Enterprise =

The Center for Sustainable Enterprise (CSE) is one of four academic and research centers at the Illinois Institute of Technology (IIT) Stuart School of Business (SSB) in the city of Chicago. The CSE has created a platform to convene the many disciplinary facets of the IIT colleges with business, community and government stakeholders in focused initiatives dedicated to making Chicago a sustainable city.

== History ==
The CSE was founded in 2000 and operates with funding on a project-by-project basis. The center has also hosted numerous seminars on environmental and sustainability issues, as well as several national and international conferences. Projects conducted by the CSE have included a form of life cycle analysis for a small Chicago company manufacturing floor maintenance products, a geographic information system (GIS) research project for two subsidiaries of Exelon, and a life cycle assessment (LCA) on a new product for S. C. Johnson.

In 2006, the Center for Sustainable Enterprise became a founding member of the Chicago Sustainable Business Alliance (CSBA), a 150-member organization dedicated to sustainability and sustainable networking in the city of Chicago.

== Mission ==
The primary mission of the CSE is the identification, development, communication and implementation of practical and equitable business strategies that advance the ecological sustainability of the Chicago metropolitan area. By expanding on traditional business and enterprise models, the center has developed strategies that look beyond conventional metrics and engage the entire business in valuing and enhancing the capital of its enterprise. The CSE developed a tool called ‘’total asset management’’ which analyses financial, physical, human and natural forms of capital. By incorporating this concept, businesses can assess and align the capital that they directly affect or influence and create a path forward into a more sustainable future. Envisioning new paradigms that appreciate all these forms of capital creates added value for the company. Another tool created by the CSE, ‘’the comprehensive enterprise models’’ helps businesses and communities, represented by both and government and non-government organizations, rethink their relationships and construct a more balanced and sustainable paradigm.

== Principal activities ==
While specific projects depend on the interests of participants, the community and funding support, the CSE performs the following activities:

- Common Ground: The CSE serves as a forum where groups can collaborate to remove barriers to achieving ecological and economic sustainability while learning, teaching and sharing the elements of sustainable enterprise.
- Executive Education: Educate, sensitize and empower key corporate executives/managers and small/medium business owners with practical and equitable business strategies that foster ecological and economic sustainability.
- Educational Support: Provide sustainable enterprise instruction, curricula and internship projects to university-based programs and community colleges in the Chicago Area.
- Commercial Applications of Research: provide the platform for quick and efficient transfers of university-based research and proven industry-based applications to companies, especially small and medium enterprises.
- Focused Business Support: Work with existing businesses and organizations to develop the tools for success in an emerging, sustainable economy.
- New Business Development: Incubate start-up companies that promote sustainable environmental technologies and practices.
- Research: Gather data on current use of elements of sustainability and develop reliable metrics and feedback loops that demonstrate the benefits related to the use of sustainable strategies.
- Information Sharing: Expand the benefits of the learning and teaching efforts of the center by sharing the systems, methods, and technologies developed through the center with other organizations and businesses, locally and nationally.

== Initiatives ==
As part of its purpose of expanding on traditional business and enterprise models, the center has participated in several projects and initiatives with small companies, local government, and other corporations.

=== Continuing Educational Programs ===
As part of its educational outreach program, the center offers seminars for universities and colleges focusing on curriculum development and collaboration for small to medium enterprises with a focus on team development, and for large corporations with a focus on functional area leaders.

=== Wind Turbine ===
In 2003 the center installed a highly efficient small wind turbine on a temporary basis in front of the Field Museum of Natural History, located in Chicago, to validate wind tunnel performance data. The turbine will demonstrate how it can provide a supplemental-energy system for the metropolitan areas.

=== Remote Hybrid Unit ===
The CSE is collaborating with a local Chicago company to introduce to the Midwest a unique lighting and security system operating on wind and solar energy – completely off the grid. This remote hybrid unit is an 18-foot light post with a security camera option.

=== Implementing Educational Programs ===
The CSE is working with the National Technical University of Athens to introduce a Master of Science in Sustainability for the Greek, balkan and middle-east markets.

=== Urban Timber ===
Urban timber represents an alternative paradigm to current forestry and landscape practices. The CSE has proposed a plan to the city of Chicago, Department of the Environment promoting the development of an urban timber selection, management and harvesting scheme that provides multiple benefits to the community, the environment, the economy, and the managing enterprise through the entire lifecycle of the trees.

=== Next Generation CO_{2} Emission Reduction Metrics ===
The CSE provides an evaluation of the footprint of a product and the carbon dioxide and CO_{2} equivalents related to its manufacture, use and final disposition.

=== Chicago Sustainable Business Alliance ===
As a founding member of a 150-member organization dedicated to sustainability, the CSE hosts monthly networking meetings and seminars.
