= Chalmers University of Technology =

University in Gothenburg, Sweden

- Chalmers tekniska högskola
- Motto: Avancez (French)
- Motto in English: Advance
- Type: Private technical university
- Established: 5 November 1829; 196 years ago
- Affiliations: IDEA, EUA, CESAER, UNITECH, EURECOM, Nordic Five Tech
- President: Martin Nilsson Jacobi
- Administrative staff: 936
- Students: 10,712 (FTE, 2021)
- Doctoral students: 1,025
- Location: Gothenburg, Västra Götaland, Sweden; 57°41′18″N 11°58′36″E
- Campus: Urban
- Nickname: Chalmerists
- Website: www.chalmers.se/en

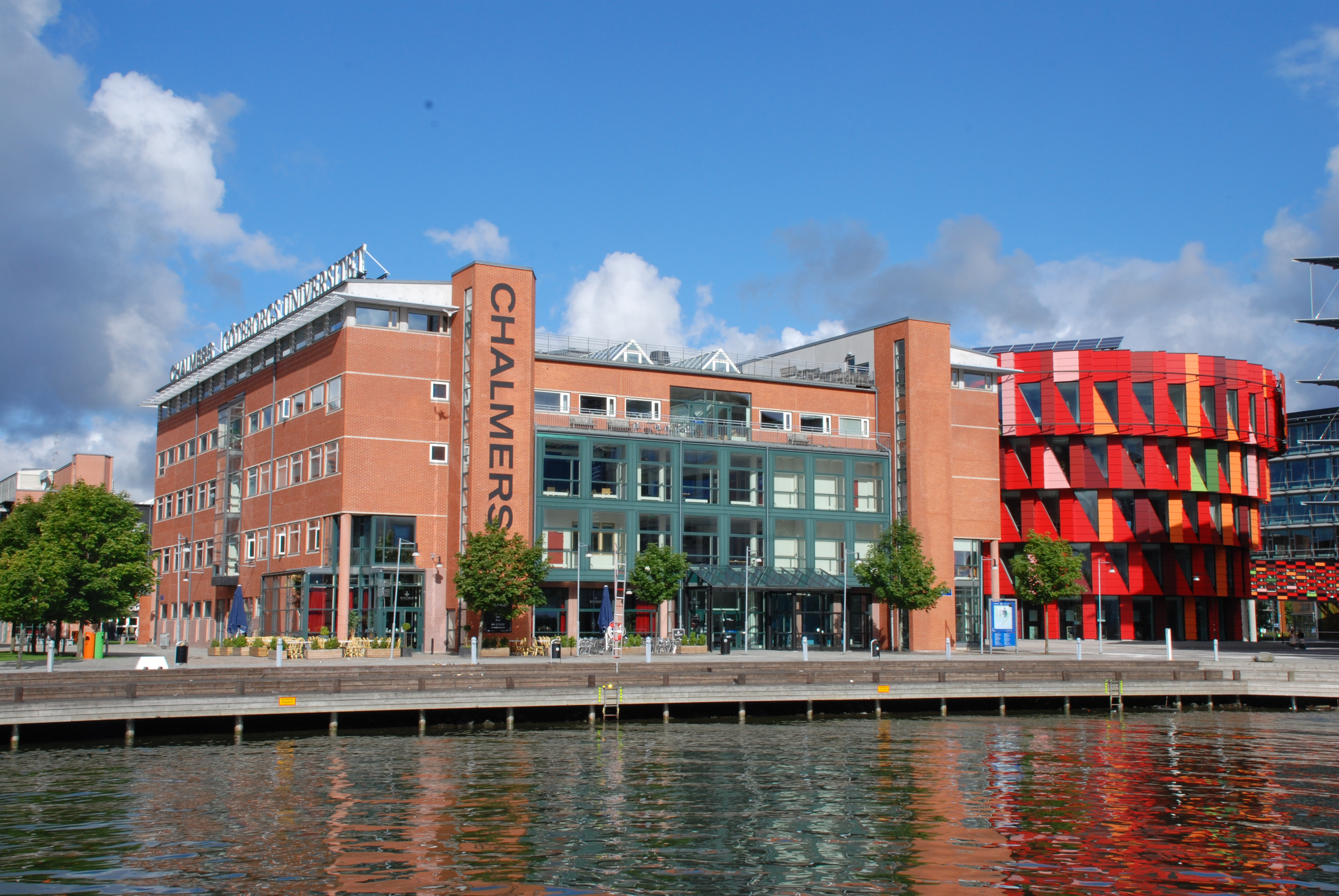
Chalmers campus in Lindholmen, Gothenburg

Chalmers University of Technology (Chalmers) is a private research university in Gothenburg, Sweden, specializing in engineering, science, architecture, maritime studies, and management. It has approximately 10,000 students and 3,000 employees.

The university participates in national and European research initiatives, including Sweden’s quantum computing program and the EU-funded Graphene Flagship.

== History ==
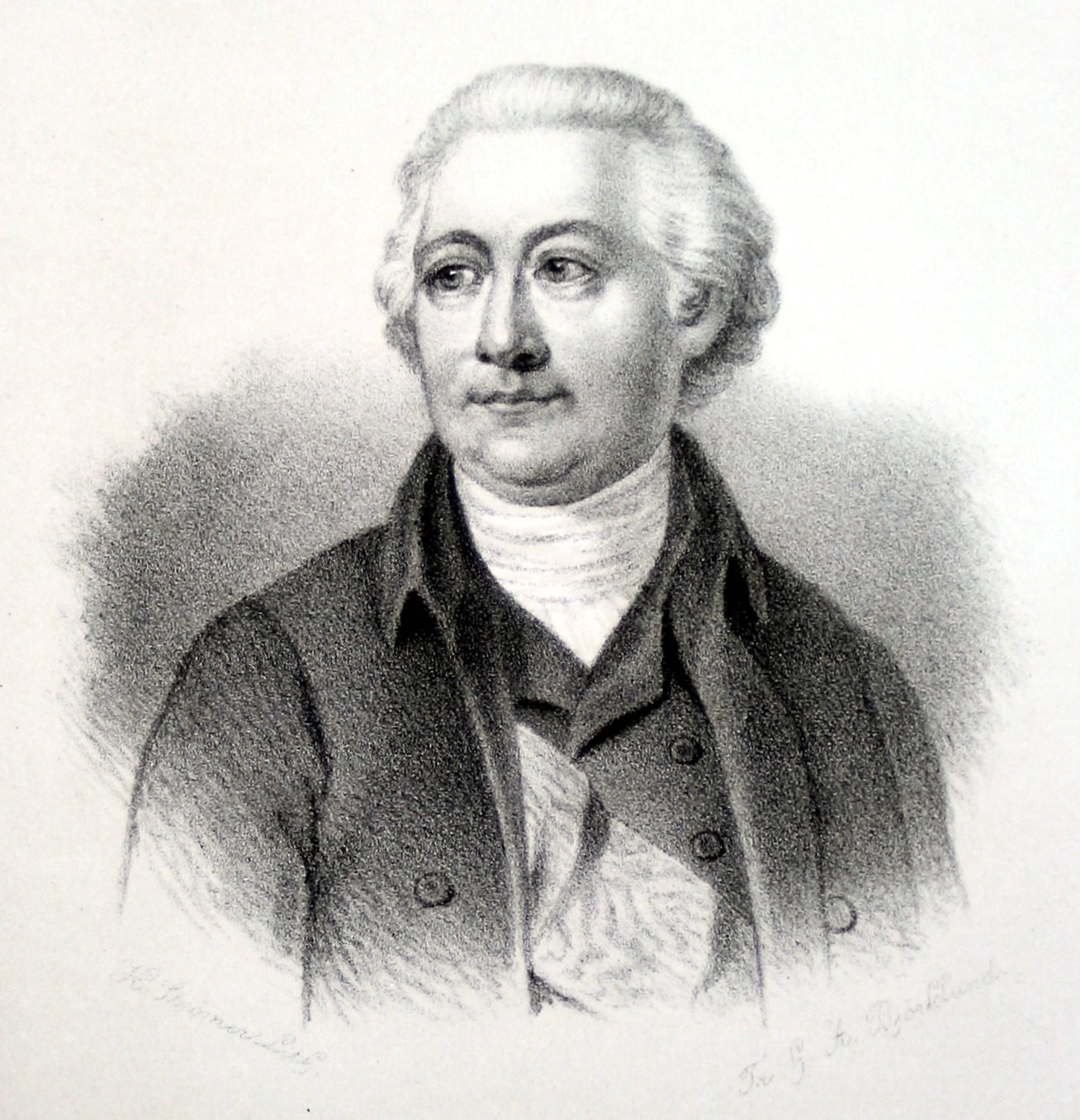
Portrait of William Chalmers

Chalmers was founded in 1829 following a donation by William Chalmers, a director of the Swedish East India Company, to establish an "industrial school". The university was run as a private institution until 1937 when it became the second state-owned technical university. In 1994 the government of Sweden reorganised Chalmers into a private company (aktiebolag) owned by a government-controlled foundation. Chalmers is one of three universities in Sweden which are named after people.

== Departments ==
Chalmers University of Technology has the following 13 departments:

- Architecture and Civil Engineering
- Chemistry and Chemical Engineering
- Communication and Learning in Science
- Computer Science and Engineering
- Electrical Engineering
- Industrial and Materials Science
- Life Sciences
- Mathematical Sciences
- Mechanics and Maritime Sciences
- Microtechnology and Nanoscience
- Physics
- Space, Earth and Environment
- Technology Management and Economics

Furthermore, Chalmers is home to six Areas of Advance and six national competence centers in key fields such as materials, mathematical modelling, environmental science, and vehicle safety.

== Research infrastructure ==
Chalmers University of Technology's research infrastructure includes:

- Chalmers AI Research Centre, CHAIR
- Chalmers Centre for Computational Science and Engineering, C3SE
- Chalmers Mass Spectrometry Infrastructure, CMSI
- Chalmers Power Central
- Chalmers Materials Analysis Laboratory
- Chalmers Simulator Centre
- Chemical Imaging Infrastructure
- Facility for Computational Systems Biology
- HSB Living Lab
- Nanofabrication Laboratory
- Onsala Space Observatory
- Revere — Chalmers Resource for Vehicle Research
- The National laboratory in terahertz characterisation
- SAFER — Vehicle and Traffic Safety Centre at Chalmers

== Rankings and reputation ==
University rankings

Global – Overall
- ARWU World: 301–400 (2025)
- QS World: 165 (2026)
- QS Employability: 83 (2022)
- THE World: 201–250 (2025)
- USNWR Global: =337 (2023)

Global – Science and engineering
- QS Engineering & Tech.: 127 (2026)
- THE Engineering: 93 (2026)

In 2018, a report from MIT ranked Chalmers among the world’s top 10 institutions for engineering education, while in 2020, the World University Research Rankings placed Chalmers 12th globally.

In the 2026 Global Employability University Ranking, published by Emerging, Chalmers was ranked 95th in the world, while in 2025, EngiRank ranked Chalmers 7th among engineering institutions in Europe. Additionally, in 2019 the U-Multirank characterized Chalmers as a top performing university.

Finally, in 2011, the International Professional Ranking of Higher Education Institutions, which is established on the basis of the number of alumni holding a post of chief executive officer (CEO) or equivalent in one of the Fortune Global 500 companies, Chalmers ranked 38th in the world, ranking 1st in Sweden and 15th in Europe.

QS World University Rankings by Subject 2026
| Subjects | Rank |
|---|---|
| Architecture and Built Environment | 51–100 |
| Engineering - Mechanical | 57 |
| Material Sciences | 78 |
| Engineering - Electrical and Electronic | 77 |
| Engineering - Chemical | 101–150 |
| Statistics and Operational Research | 151–200 |
| Engineering - Civil and Structural | 51–100 |
| Physics and Astronomy | 151–200 |
| Chemistry | 177 |
| Computer Science and Information Systems | 143 |
| Mathematics | 201–250 |

== Ties and partnerships ==
Chalmers is a member of several European university networks, including the IDEA League, UNITECH and Nordic Five Tech. It also maintains research collaborations with institutions such as ETH Zurich and Stanford University.

Chalmers has general exchange agreements with many European and U.S. universities and maintains an exchange program agreement with National Chiao Tung University (NCTU) in Taiwan where the exchange students from the two universities maintain offices for, among other things, helping local students with applying and preparing for an exchange year as well as acting as representatives.

Finally, Chalmers also has partnerships with industries such as Ericsson, Volvo, Saab AB and AstraZeneca.

== Students ==
Each year, around 250 postgraduate degrees are awarded as well as 850 graduate degrees. About 1,000 post-graduate students attend programmes at the university, and many students are taking Master of Science engineering programmes and the Master of Architecture programme. Since 2007, all master's programmes are taught in English for both national and international students. This was a result of the adaptation to the Bologna Process that started in 2004 at Chalmers (as the first technical university in Sweden).

As of 2025, about 17% of all students at Chalmers come from countries outside Sweden to enroll in a program at Chalmers.

Around 2,700 students also attend Bachelor of Science engineering programmes, merchant marine and other undergraduate courses at Campus Lindholmen. Chalmers also shares some students with University of Gothenburg in the joint IT University project. The IT University focuses exclusively on information technology and offers bachelor's and master's programmes with degrees issued from either Chalmers or University of Gothenburg, depending on the programme.

Chalmers confers honorary doctoral degrees to people outside the university who have shown great merit in their research or in society.

== Organization ==
Chalmers is an aktiebolag with 100 shares à 1,000 SEK, all of which are owned by the Chalmers University of Technology Foundation, a private foundation, which appoints the university board and the president. The foundation has its members appointed by the Swedish government (4 to 8 seats), the departments appoint one member, the student union appoints one member and the president automatically gains one chair. Each department is led by a department head, usually a member of the faculty of that department. The faculty senate represents members of the faculty when decisions are taken.

== Campuses ==
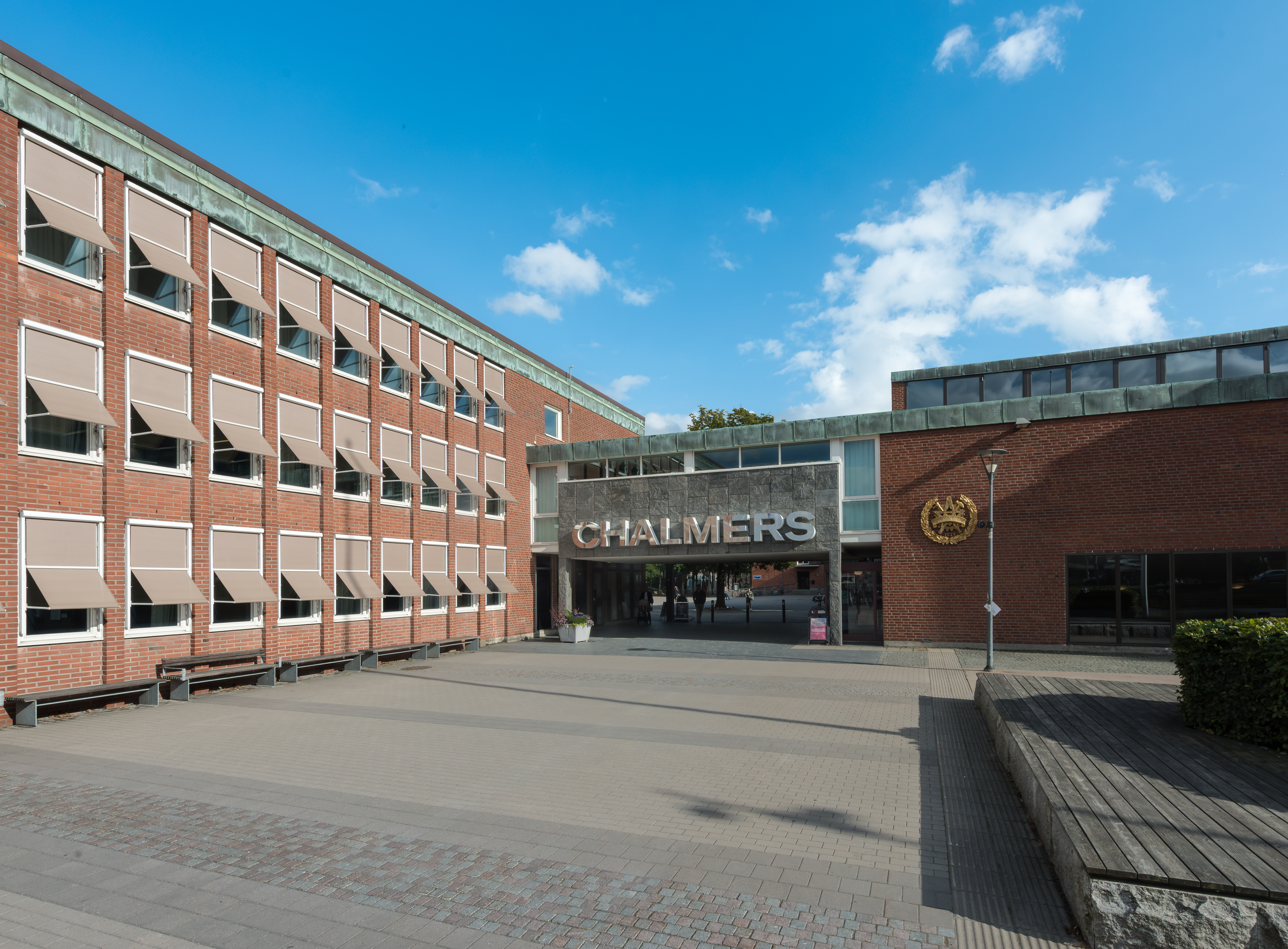
Entrance to Chalmers campus from Chalmersplatsen

In 1937, the school moved from the city centre to the new Gibraltar Campus, named after the mansion which owned the grounds, where it is now located. The Lindholmen College Campus was created in the early 1990s and is located on the island Hisingen. Campus Johanneberg and Campus Lindholmen, as they are now called, are connected by tram and bus lines.

== Student societies and traditions ==
Traditions include the graduation ceremony and the Cortège procession, an annual public event.

- Chalmers Students' Union
- Chalmers Aerospace Club — founded in 1981. In Swedish frequently also referred to as Chalmers rymdgrupp (roughly Chalmers Space Group). Members of CAC led the ESA funded CACTEX (Chalmers Aerospace Club Thermal EXperiment) project where the thermal conductivity of alcohol at zero gravity was investigated using a sounding rocket.
- Chalmers Alternative Sports — Student association organizing trips and other activities working to promote alternative sports. Every year the Chalmers Wake arranges a pond wakeboard contest in the fountain outside the architecture building at Chalmers.
- Chalmersbaletten
- Chalmers Ballong Corps
- Chalmers Baroque Ensemble
- Chalmers Business Society (CBS)
- CETAC
- Chalmers Choir
- Chalmers Formula Student
- ETA — (E-sektionens Teletekniska Avdelning) Founded in 1935, it's a student-run amateur radio society that also engages in hobby electronics.
- Chalmers Film and Photography Committee (CFFC)
- Chalmersspexet — Amateur theater group which has produced new plays since 1948
- Chalmers International Reception Committee (CIRC)
- XP — Committee that is responsible for the experimental workshop, a workshop open for students
- Chalmers Program Committee — PU
- Chalmers Students for Sustainability (CSS) — promoting sustainable development among the students and runs projects, campaigns and lectures
- Föreningen Chalmers Skeppsbyggare, Chalmers Naval Architecture Students' Society (FCS)
- Chalmers Sailing Society
- RANG — Chalmers Indian Association
- Caster — Developing and operating a Driver in the Loop (DIL) simulator, which is used in various courses and projects

== Notable people ==
=== Alumni ===
- Christopher Ahlberg, computer scientist and entrepreneur, Spotfire and Recorded Future founder
- Abbas Anvari, former chancellor of Sharif University of Technology
- Linn Berggren, artist and former member of Ace of Base
- Gustaf Dalén, Nobel Prize in Physics
- Sigfrid Edström, director ASEA, president IOC
- Claes-Göran Granqvist, physicist
- Margit Hall, first female architect in Sweden
- Harald Hammarström, linguist
- Krister Holmberg, professor of Surface Chemistry at Chalmers University of Technology.
- Mats Hillert, metallurgist
- Ivar Jacobson, computer scientist
- Erik Johansson, photographic surrealist
- Jan Johansson, jazz musician
- Leif Johansson, former CEO Volvo
- Olav Kallenberg, probability theorist
- Marianne Kärrholm, chemical engineer and Chalmers professor
- Mikael Kubista, entrepreneur, inventor, professor
- Hjalmar Kumlien, architect
- Abraham Langlet, chemist
- Martin Lorentzon, Spotify and TradeDoubler founder
- Ingemar Lundström, physicist, chairman of the Nobel Committee for Physics
- Carl Magnusson, industrial designer and inventor
- Semir Mahjoub, businessman and entrepreneur
- Peter Nordin, computer scientist and entrepreneur
- Åke Öberg, biomedical scientist
- Leif Östling, CEO Scania AB
- PewDiePie (Felix Arvid Ulf Kjellberg), YouTuber (no degree)
- Carl Abraham Pihl, engineer and director of first Norwegian railroad (Hovedbanen)
- Richard Soderberg, businessman, inventor and professor at Massachusetts Institute of Technology
- Hans Stråberg, former president and CEO of Electrolux
- Ludvig Strigeus, computer scientist and entrepreneur
- Per Håkan Sundell, computer scientist and entrepreneur
- Marcus Wandt, test pilot and ESA astronaut
- Jan Wäreby, businessman
- Gert Wingårdh, architect
- Vera Sandberg, engineer
- Anna von Hausswolff, musician
- Anita Schjøll Brede, entrepreneur
- Martin Rolinski, artist and former member of Bodies Without Organs
- Ola Serneke, founder and former CEO of Serneke
- Erik Gustaf Hallén, physicist and electrical engineer

=== Faculty and staff ===
- Hellmut Fischmeister
- Torkel Wallmark

=== Presidents ===
Although the official Swedish title for the head is "rektor", the university now uses "President" as the English translation.

| 1829 – 1852 | Carl Palmstedt |
| 1852 – 1881 | Eduard von Schoultz |
| 1881 – 1913 | August Wijkander |
| 1913 – 1933 | Hugo Grauers |
| 1934 – 1943 | Sven Hultin |
| 1943 – 1958 | Gustav Hössjer |
| 1958 – 1966 | Lennart Rönnmark |
| 1966 – 1974 | Nils Gralén |
| 1974 – 1989 | Sven Olving |
| 1989 – 1998 | Anders Sjöberg |
| 1998 – 2006 | Jan-Eric Sundgren |
| 2006 – 2015 | Karin Markides |
| 2015 – 2023 | Stefan Bengtsson |
| 2023 – | Martin Nilsson Jacobi |

== See also ==
- KTH Royal Institute of Technology
- Chalmers School of Entrepreneurship
- IT University of Göteborg
- List of universities in Sweden
- Marie Rådbo, astronomer
- The International Science Festival in Gothenburg
- University of Gothenburg (Göteborg University)
