= The Cortège =

Annual carnival parade in Gothenburg, Sweden

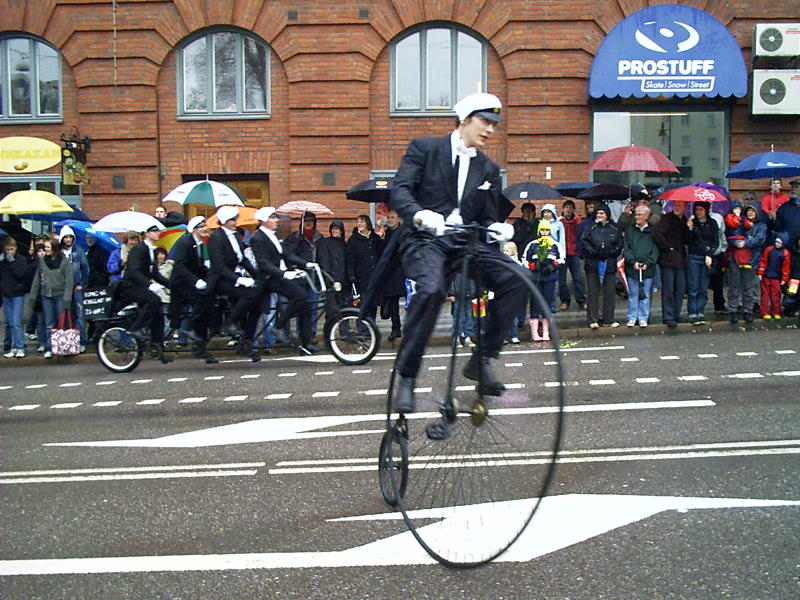
Students of Chalmers University of Technology in Gothenburg, Sweden, riding a penny-farthing and a quadruplet tandem bicycle (in the background) with student caps, during the Chalmers Cortège of 2006.

The Cortège (Swedish: Cortègen), or The Chalmers Cortège (Swedish: Chalmerscortègen) is an annual carnival parade held on Walpurgis Night (30 April) by students of the Chalmers University of Technology in Gothenburg. The Cortège consists of around 1000 students and around 50 truck carriages, each carriage depicting—in a satirical and comic way—significant events that have taken place since the previous parade. The procession makes its way through the city centre, where it is seen by around 350,000 people each year.

== History ==
Before the first Cortège was arranged, students at Chalmers walked the streets with one foot on the pavement and one foot in the gutter each year on 30 April, the day when Chalmers students traditionally exchange their black student caps for white caps. In 1909, the students decided to gather all the horse carriages in the city to travel the distance they usually walked. The next year, the Chalmers Students' Union decided to organize a parade of student culture jokes. In the year 1911 a committee, Chalmers Cortège Committé (CCC), was created to organize the whole procession.

The current cortège is organised by the Chalmers Cortège Committee (CCC) and dates back to 1920. On 7 April this year, a group of road and water engineers decided to celebrate their final exams by hiring carriages and taking a trip to Slottsskogen. There, they circled up to a food stall and attracted a lot of attention on the way. In those days there was already a tradition of Valborg - the Chalmerists marched every year on 30 April in a long line along Vasagatan with one foot on the pavement and the other in the gutter in connection with the so-called springtime "mösspåtagning" (i.e. the day they put on - and still put on - the white tophat). This time, horse-drawn carriages were used and the destination was once again Slottsskogen. In 1923, the cortège began to acquire its current features, where various phenomena were guessed, and from 1927 and annually at the same time, the cortège departed regularly.

Ever since, except for 1912 due to exam scheduling conflicts, as well as 1940 due to World War II, CCC has arranged The Cortège. Due to the COVID-19 pandemic, the 2020 edition was cancelled.
