= Stefan Bengtsson (engineer) =

Swedish academic (born 1961)

Stefan Bengtsson MSE IVA
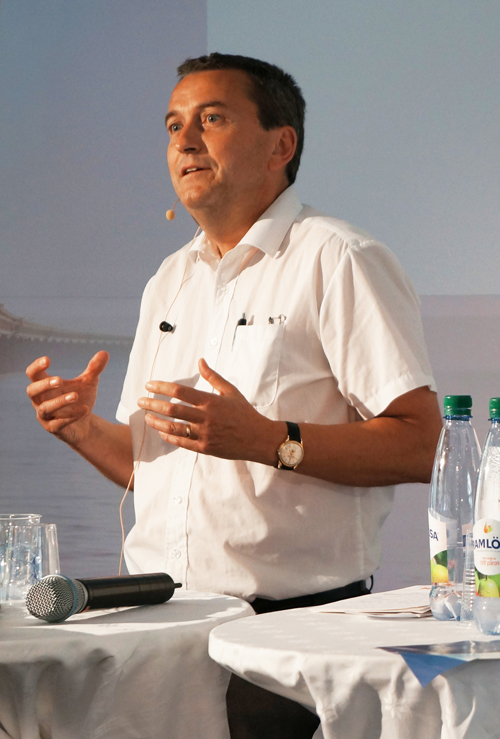
- Bengtsson in 2012.
- Born: Jan Stefan Bengtsson; 13 September 1961 (age 64); Kortedala Parish, Gothenburg, Sweden
- Scientific career
- Education: Chalmers University of Technology (MSE)
- Fields: Solid-state electronics
- Thesis: Preparation and electrical characterization of silicon structures formed by wafer bonding (1991)

Jan Stefan Bengtsson (born 27 September 1961) is a Swedish engineer and professor in solid-state electronics. He is the former vice-chancellor of Malmö University and president of Chalmers University of Technology.

== Biography ==
After completing a Master of Science in Engineering degree in 1985, he worked at SAAB Automobile in Trollhättan, Västergötland before returning to Chalmers for doctoral studies. In 1992, Bengtsson defended his thesis on how complex silicon-based materials and components can be constructed using wafer bonding, for which he received the SAAB–Scania Award. Since 2002, he has been a professor in solid-state electronics at Chalmers. His field of study includes silicon-based materials, components and electronic circuits, namely the basis of all consumer electronics.

Following the turn of the millennium, he was a visiting professor at the Grenoble Institute of Technology for six months. Bengtsson held office as vice-chancellor of Malmö University as well as prorector and vice-president of the Chalmers University of Technology, prior to his promotion on 1 August 2015 as president. Since 1 February 2014, he has been chairman of the board of SUNET, the Swedish university computer network.

Academic offices
Preceded by Lennart Olausson	Vice-Chancellor of Malmö University; 2011–2015	Succeeded by Kerstin Tham
Preceded by Karin Markides	President of Chalmers University of Technology; 2015–2023	Succeeded by Martin Nilsson Jacobi
