= Lindholmen, Gothenburg =

Urban district in Gothenburg, Sweden

Coordinates: 57°42′27″N 11°56′05″E

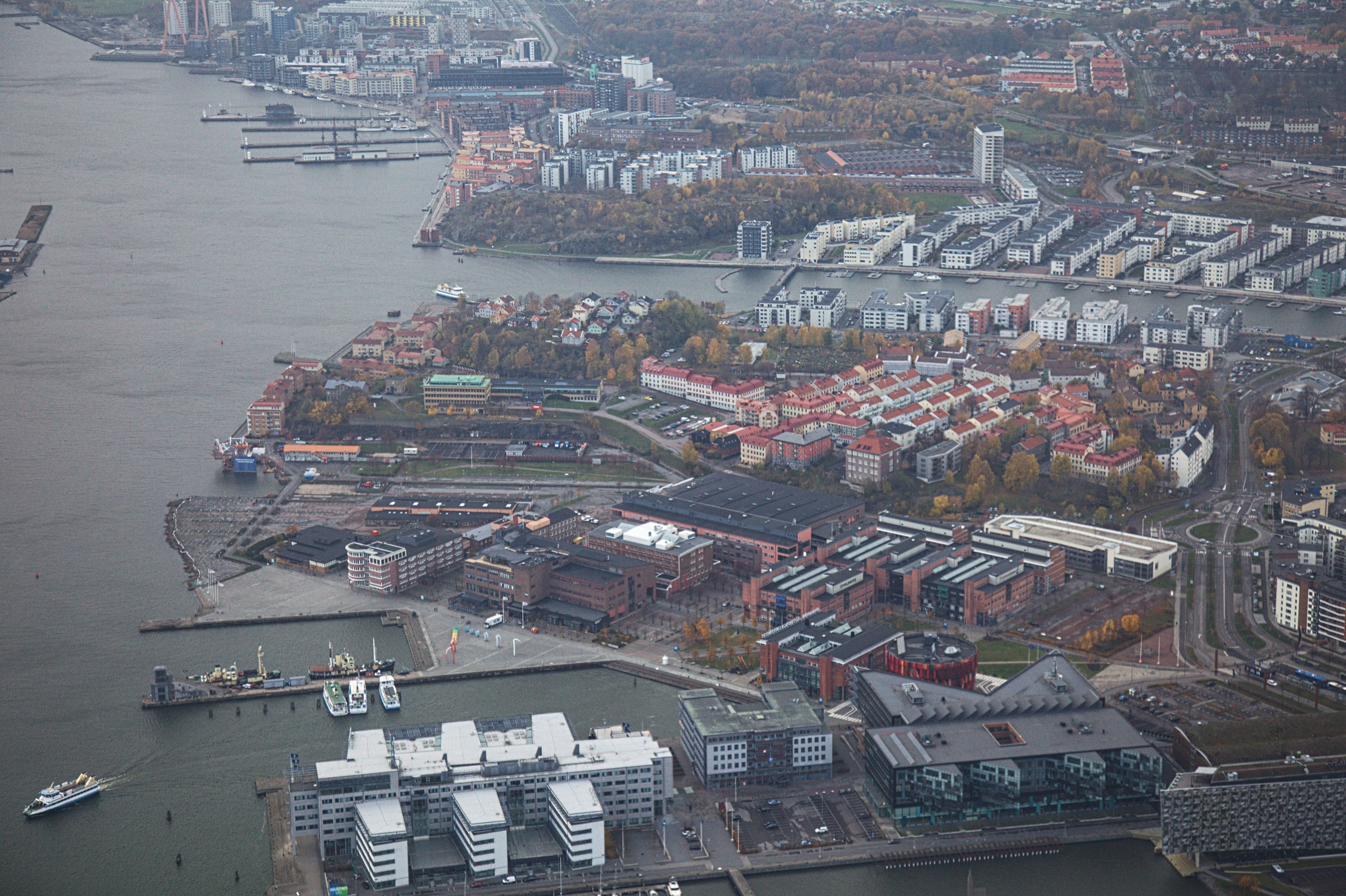
Aerial photo of Lindholmen from the east

Lindholmen (literally "The Linden Tree Island") is a former island in the Göta Älv river, now part of the larger island of Hisingen, in Gothenburg, Sweden. Lindholmen was not attached to Hisingen until 1864, or perhaps even later, and the western part of the channel separating the two islands is preserved in the form of the inlet Sannegårdshamnen, which now functions as a marina.

In the Middle Ages, Lindholmen was the site of Lindholmen Castle, which was briefly an important royal residence during the reign of Magnus IV of Sweden.

Later, in the nineteenth century, the Lindholmen shipyard was located in the area.

== Lindholmen Science Park ==
Lindholmen Science Park is an international collaborative environment for research, innovation and education within the areas Transport, ICT and Media. The district is located in Gothenburg, Sweden, on the island of Hisingen on the northern shore of Göta Älv. The Lindholmen district area is 104 hectares. In this area, campuses for Chalmers University of Technology, the University of Gothenburg, and the IT University of Göteborg can be found. The universities collaborate with high tech industries and the local community in different development projects. Currently 250 companies, notably Volvo Cars, Volvo Technology, Ericsson, IBM, Semcon, Scania AB and SVT. Over 21 000 employees or students are working or studying at the area.

The main operators of Lindholmen Science Park are as of 2014 Gothenburg Municipality, Chalmers University of Technology, the University of Gothenburg, Volvo Group, Ericsson, Volvo Cars, Business Region Göteborg, TeliaSonera, Saab, and the Swedish Road Administration.

As the Lindholmen area was growing, street traffic has been adapted for high capacity needs. Lindholmen can be reached by several modes of transportation: Gothenburg's oldest trunk bus line, number 16, goes through Lindholmen. The bus lanes are separated from the rest of the traffic in an alleyway and may be used later as part of the Gothenburg tram network, but this is not currently in planning. There is also a ferry, Älvsnabben, connecting Lindholmen with Stenpiren. Between 2015 and 2020 electric buses were running between Johanneberg Science Park adjacent to Chalmers and Lindholmen Science Park as part of an electric bus demonstration project.
