= Jan Wäreby =

Swedish businessman

Jan Wäreby (born 1956) in Karlskoga, Sweden, is the current Head of Group Function Sales and Senior Vice President at Ericsson.

== Career ==
Jan Wäreby began his career at Ericsson in 1980 and worked in the transmission unit. He was assigned to the Cellular Systems unit in 1986 and held various senior roles. Wäreby was promoted to Director of Sales and Marketing in 1992 and was responsible for creating standards for the American market and building Ericsson's cellular business. From 1994 to 1998, Wäreby had numerous roles in Global Sales and Market Operations and also Radio Systems. Wäreby's role expanded when he was appointed the Executive Vice President, in charge of the geographical market area Europe, Africa and Middle East.

In 2000, Jan Wäreby had several roles as the Executive Vice President of Telefonaktiebolaget LM Ericsson, Head of Consumer Products Division.

From 2002 to 2006, Jan Wäreby was Corporate Executive Vice President and Head of Sales and Marketing for Sony Ericsson Mobile Communications and played an integral role in establishing the joint venture.

From 2006 - 2011 Jan Wäreby was Senior Vice President and Head of Business Unit Multimedia.

== Education ==
Jan Wäreby holds a Master of Science degree from Chalmers University of Technology in Goteborg.
