= Intentia =

Software company

- Type: Subsidiary of Infor Global Solutions)
- Industry: Computer software
- Founded: (1984)
- Fate: acquired by Lawson Software
- Successors: Lawson Software, Now Infor
- Headquarters: Danderyd, Sweden
- Key people: Romesh Wadhwani (chairman); Bertrand Sciard (CEO)
- Products: ERP
- Revenue: SEK 2,982,900,000 SEK (2004)
- Website: www.intentia.com

Intentia was a software company founded in 1984 that provided applications such as customer relationship management, supply chain management and asset management. Intentia was a public company traded on the Stockholm Stock Exchange (XSSE) under the symbol INT B. In April 2006, Lawson Software and Intentia merged to form the new LAWSON.

== History ==
Intentia was founded in 1984 by Björn Algkvist, Mikael Agerås, Göran Felldin and Rune Groppfeldt. The ERP market was at the time locally fragmented with few international suppliers. During the 1980s Intentia concentrated on establishing a strong position for itself on the Swedish market.

In 1991, Intentia bought Entra Data and then proceeded to redevelop the flagship product known as Movex. During the 1990s, Intentia established itself in 30 countries, first via business partners. During the latter part of the period, Intentia chose to acquire some of these business partners as well as to establish new subsidiaries.

At first the Intentia Application Suite ran just in IBM platforms (AS/400, S/390, etc.), but in middle 1990s, Intentia made the decision to carry out a technology shift to a new development environment based on Java, being one of the first ERP vendors to perform this transition. As a consequence of the new technology, the applications were certified on a number of additional operating systems, including Unix in the form of Sun Solaris. For a while Intentia maintained both RPG and Java based applications, even when the current developments and new applications were mainly based on Java.

Java based technology permitted the integration of new applications with the intent for Intentia not to be considered just as an ERP vendor, but as an e-Solutions provider. BI applications such as Opportunity Analyzer, Data Warehouse applications such as BPW, and some applications such as e-sales, e-procurement or e-business solutions, have improved the system to match the technology requirements of business worldwide.

Intentia began implementing its internationalization plans at the same time that it started planning significant development projects. In order to finance these projects, Intentia stock was introduced on the Stockholm Stock Exchange in 1996.

== Merger history ==
On June 2, 2005, Lawson Software, Inc. announced an agreement to combine with Stockholm, Sweden-based Intentia International AB in an all-stock transaction. Upon completion of the transaction, the company will operate under the name Lawson Software with U.S. headquarters in St. Paul, Minnesota, and international operations headquartered in Stockholm, Sweden. Intentia was acquired by Lawson Software in 2005 for SEK 3.5 billion and was delisted from the stock exchange's O-list on May 26, 2006.

In 2011, Lawson was in turn acquired by Infor Global Solutions.
