= Serneke =

Construction and development company based in Sweden

Serneke Group AB
- Company type: Public Aktiebolag
- Industry: Construction
- Founded: 2002; 24 years ago
- Founder: Ola Serneke
- Headquarters: Gothenburg, Sweden
- Area served: Sweden
- Key people: Daniel Åstenius (CEO)
- Revenue: SEK 6.871 billion (2020)
- Number of employees: 1,120
- Website: www.serneke.se
- Footnotes / references Annual report 2020

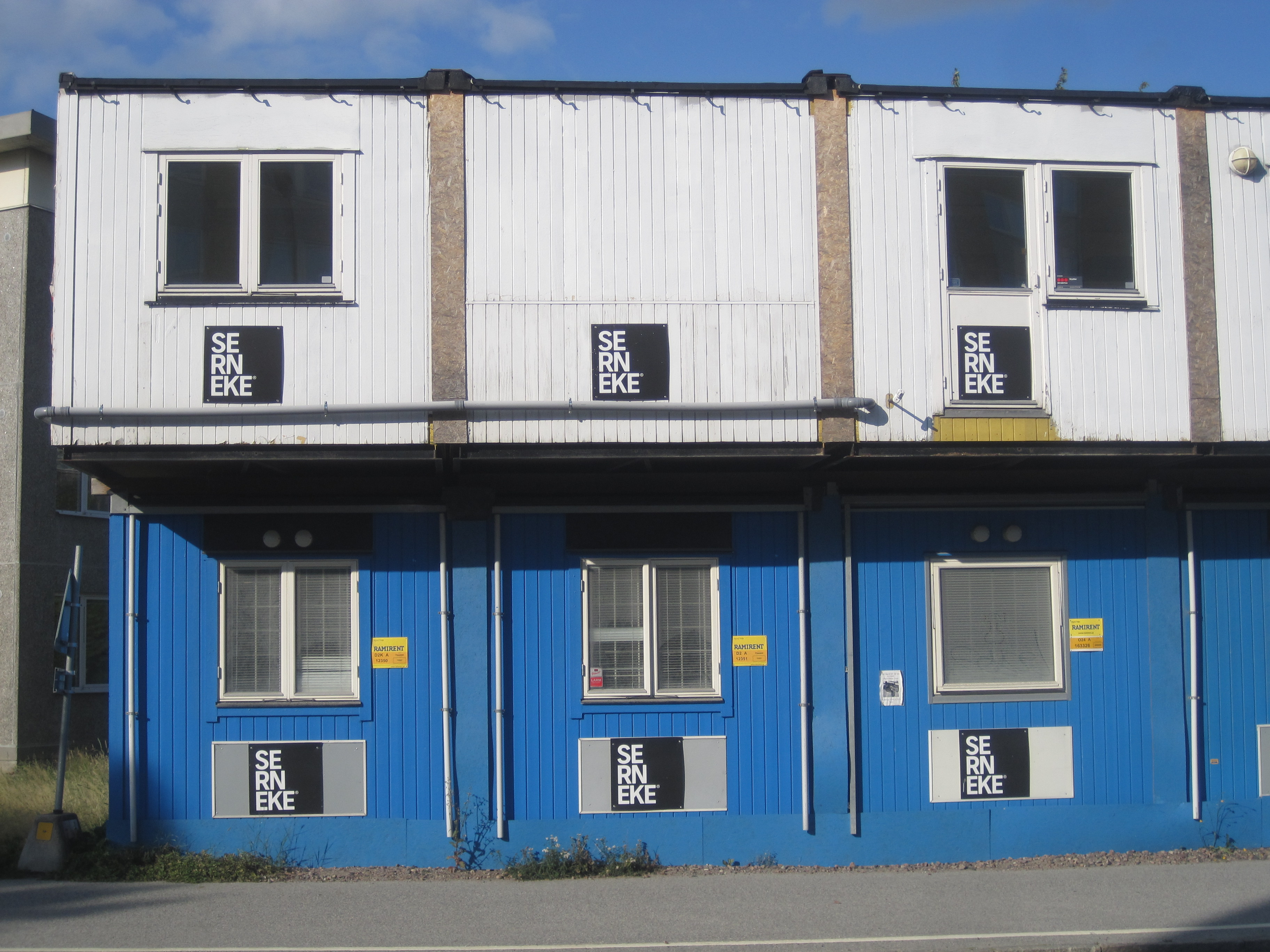
Construction trailers from the Swedish construction company Serneke in Lund, Sweden.

Serneke Group AB, commonly known as Serneke (Swedish pronunciation: [²sæːɳˌeːkɛ]), is a construction and development company based in Gothenburg, Sweden. Serneke was founded in 2002 as Serneke och Fagerberg bygg och konsult AB, later shortened to SEFA. The company was renamed Serneke in 2014. The company has grown rapidly, and was listed on Nasdaq Stockholm in 2016, having had a revenue of SEK 3.1 billion in 2015. By 2019, Serneke was the seventh largest construction company in Sweden.

Notable Serneke projects include Prioritet Serneke Arena, a multi-sport complex inaugurated in 2015, and Karlatornet, the tallest building in the Nordic countries.
