= Semcon =

Swedish technology company

Semcon AB
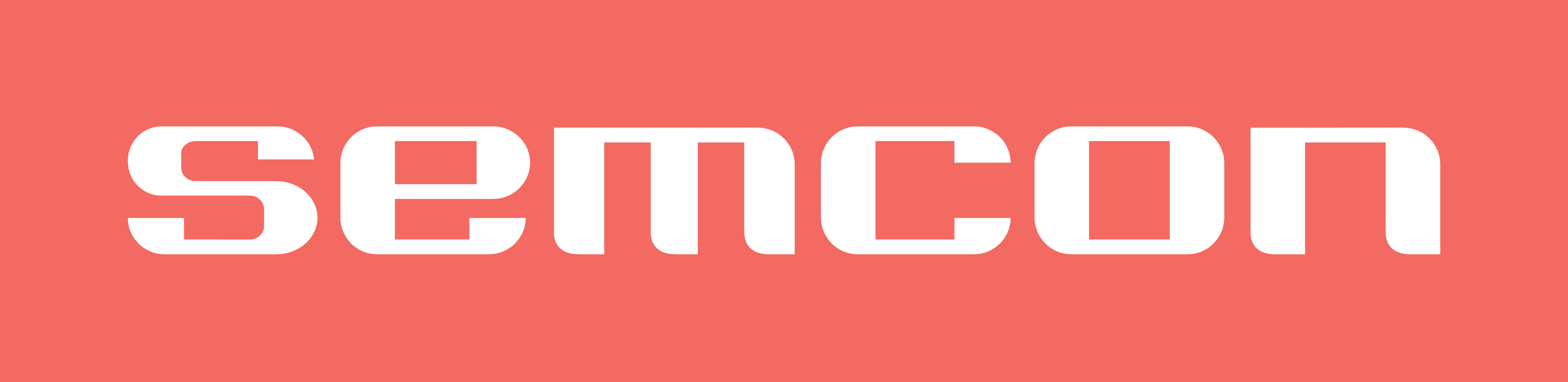
- Company type: Public company
- Industry: automotive industry, manufacturing and process industries, energy sector, life science, telecom
- Founded: Västerås, Sweden (1980)
- Founder: Arvid Hansen
- Headquarters: Gothenburg, Sweden
- Number of locations: Brazil: São Bernardo do Campo;Resende; China: Beijing; Guangzhou; Shanghai; Germany: Munich; Hungary: Budapest; India:Bangalore; Norway:Kongsberg; Spain: Antas; Sweden:Gothenburg; Eskilstuna; Falun; Helsingborg; Hudiksvall; Jönköping; Karlskrona; Karlstad; Lidköping; Linköping; Ludvika; Luleå; Lund; Olofström; Oskarshamn; Stenungsund; Stockholm; Södertälje; Trollhättan; Västerås; Växjö; Örebro; United Kingdom: Havant; Leavesden; Warwick; South Woodham Ferrers; Grantham;
- Area served: Worldwide
- Key people: Markus Granlund; CEO; Björn Strömberg; Chief Financial Officer
- Number of employees: 2,000 (2017)

Semcon (Scandinavian Engineering & Marketing Consultants) is a Swedish multinational technology company, specialized in product development. Semcon collaborates mainly with companies in the automotive industry, energy and life science sectors. It has 2,000 specialised employees, and conducts the entire product development cycle, from strategy and technology development to design and product information.

Semcon was founded in Västerås, Sweden, in 1980 and has offices in over 40 locations in nine countries. In 2015, the Group reported annual sales of SEK 2.6 billions.

There are both single assignments and projects where specific teams are formed for product development. The company operates several research projects, including Sonic Movement, which is developing sound effects for electric cars.

== History ==
Semcon was founded in 1980 in Västerås by Arvid Hansen. In 1983, Hansen also started operations in Gothenburg and, in 1985, the head office was moved to Gothenburg. In 1990, Semcon was sold to VIAK. VIAK was then sold to VBB Group. After a management buy out, Semcon was introduced to the Swedish Stock Exchange in 1997. A rapid growth and expansion in Sweden took place.

In the beginning of 2000, Semcon started a series of sub brands such as Zipper, Zuite, Zystems, Zooma, Zingle, Zetup with a focus on IT. (called the Z-companies) Pentech in the UK was acquired in 2005 and this was the first Semcon operation outside Sweden. In 2005, the first office in China was opened and soon one in Hungary. Two larger acquisitions took place in 2007: German IVM Automotive, and Swedish Caran. With IVM Automotive, Semcon now also had operations in Brazil, India and Germany. The Z-companies were sold except Zooma.

In 2015, Norwegian product development company Kongsberg Devotek became wholly owned by Semcon, forming its Norwegian division.

In February 2017, Semcon sold its business area Engineering Services Germany to Valmet Automotive. The German branch for product information remained Semcon.

In 2022, Ratos acquired Semcon and the Semcon shares were delisted from the Nasdaq Stockholm stock exchange on 22 November 2022.

== Core business ==
Semcon offers engineering services and product information services for the entire product development chain, from requirement studies to finished product.

Engineering Services: The three main areas are product development, production development and plant design. These include:

→Automotive engineering →Mechanics →Electrics & electronics →Plant design →Design →Automation →Test & verification →Design→ →User experience →Project management →Quality →Production & process development →Calculation & simulation

Product Information: The three main areas are online marketing communication, after market information and distribution of information. These include:

→Information strategy →Information design →Serviceability →Online marketing communication →Information management →Training →Product and user information →Service information →Parts & accessories information →Illustration & graphics →Digital distribution.

== Business areas ==
Semcon is grouped in three business areas:

=== Engineering Services Nordic ===
Engineering services in the Nordic region. This encompasses varied sectors of activity including: automotive engineering, industrial design, mechanical design, production technology, prototypes, electricity and automation, embedded systems, both hardware and software.

=== Engineering Services International ===
Engineering services in Brazil, India, UK and Russia. This encompasses varied sectors of activity including: automotive engineering, industrial design, mechanical design, production technology, prototypes, electricity and automation, embedded systems, both hardware and software.

=== Product Information ===
Business area product information delivers services ranging from online marketing communication to aftermarket information for complex products, software and plants. The business area has activities in Sweden, Germany, China, UK, and Hungary.

== Projects ==
Campaigns from Semcon during 2016 involving internal product development has been Smart Bike Engine, The Smiling Car and Re-Search. Other projects includes Autonomous snow removal vehicle and product information for CEVT.

=== Sonic Movement ===
Sonic Movement is a research project operated by Semcon. Premiered in September 2013, Sonic Movement proposes creating a new "adaptive" system of warning sounds and noises for electric cars, which is in opposition to another industry trend of replicating combustion engine noises for electric car sound effects.

Founders James Brooks and Fernando Ocaña are on the design team, as well as artists Holly Herndon and Matt Dryhurst. The project aims to meet a proposal for a US mandate which would require all quiet electric vehicles to emit warning sounds, as well as legislation passed by the European Parliament in April 2014, which states that all new electric cars sold in the EU had to emit noise by 2019. However, Ocaña notes that while legislators are "looking at this from a technical point of view, [Sonic Movement is] looking at it from a user experience point of view."
