= Chalmers Students' Union =

Student union at Chalmers University of Technology

Chalmers Student Union (Chalmers studentkår or ChS) is the student union at Chalmers University of Technology in Gothenburg, Sweden. Its primary purpose is to look after the interests of the students of the university in questions regarding the education. The student union also arranges one of Europe's largest labour market days, CHARM.

The social committee of ChS, consisting of 6 members, is called FestU. It was founded in 1948. FestU's primary job is to arrange big parties for the student union members, their biggest event of the year is Valborgskalaset which is held April 30 every year.

== History ==
The union was founded in 1904, and the first charter of the organisation was adopted in 1906. In 1911 a proposal to start The Cortège, an annual carnival parade now seen by 250,000 people each year, was accepted. The union's own magazine Tofsen was first published in 1944, and ChS obtained its first union building Lopphuset that same year. A new union building was opened in 1952. The union owns several corporations, including Cremona, a bookstore which became an aktiebolag in 1988. A new union building was inaugurated in 2001. The building was drawn by Gert Wingårdh and won the Kasper Salin Prize that year.

== Notable pranks ==
In 1955, a student at the university, Rickard Wilson, held a fake disputation on fatilary calculus, witnessed by many of the larger newspapers in Sweden, fooling many of the journalists, who the day after produced a number of serious articles on the disputation. Three years later, in 1958, a committee at the union, Chalmersspexet, donated 64 öre–corresponding to around 4.5 USD of today–to the Swedish state to "even out the national debt to a whole number of kronor". In 1968, when the Stockholm University Student Union occupied their union building, ChS decided to occupy the brewery Pripps. Before the transfer of sovereignty over Hong Kong to China from the United Kingdom in 1997, the students' union wrote a request to the British Prime Minister asking if they could hire the whole of Hong Kong for a few minutes in connection with the transfer to China.

== See also ==
- Institute of Technology Students' Union
- The Cortège
