= Campus Norrköping =

Campus of Linköping University in Sweden

Coordinates: 58°35′23.52″N 16°10′36.44″E

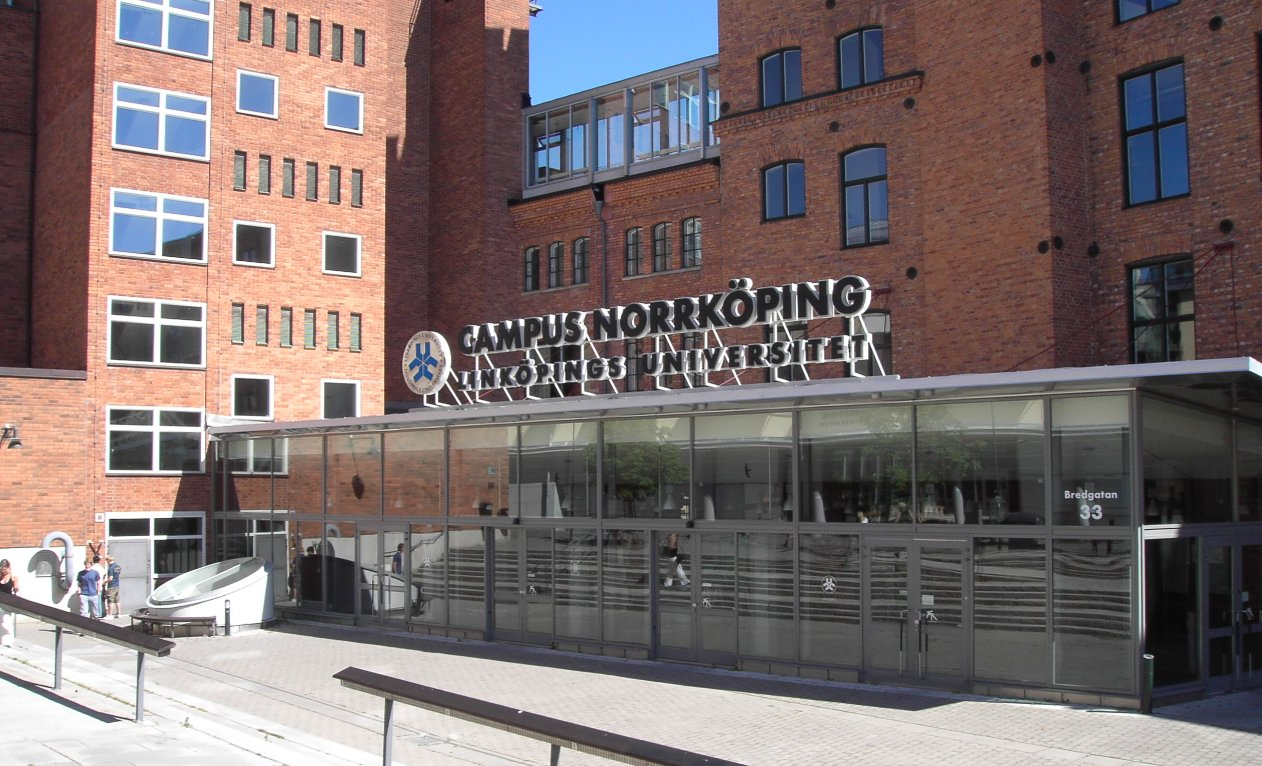
Entrance to Campus Norrköping in the old Ericsson-factory

Campus Norrköping is one of Linköping University's four campuses, located in the historical Industrilandskapet in Norrköping's city center in Sweden.
