= IT University =

Swedish joint university department

IT University is a joint department between Chalmers University of Technology and the University of Gothenburg in Sweden. This joint venture offers a great scope for cooperation between researchers with different areas of expertise and academic specialties within the field of information technology.

The programmes offered are based on advanced research and are in a constant state of development. IT University was established in the autumn of 2001. Today it offers programs at both Bachelor's and Master's level, mostly with a focus on applied information technology.

== Programs in English ==
- C:Art:Media Master Program
- Intelligent Systems Design
- Master's in Software Engineering and Management
- Software Engineering and Management International
- MSc in Applied Data Science
