= Gunnar Svedberg =

Swedish chemist (born 1947)

Professor Gunnar Svedberg (born 12 August 1947 in Annefors, Bollnäs Municipality) is a former Rector of the University of Gothenburg, in Sweden.

Svedberg studied at the Royal Institute of Technology (KTH) in Stockholm and received a PhD in chemical engineering in 1975. He became a full professor at the KTH in 1989. He was the Rector (corresponding to Vice-Chancellor or President) of Mid Sweden University College from 1999 to 2003, and of the University of Gothenburg between July 2003 and September 2006. He was President of Innventia, until his retirement in June 2011.

Svedberg has been a member of the Royal Swedish Academy of Engineering Sciences since 1992.

Academic offices
Preceded by Alf Gunnmo	Rector of Mid Sweden University; 1999-2003	Succeeded by Pia Sandvik Wiklund
Preceded by Bo Samuelsson	Rector of the University of Gothenburg; 2003-2006	Succeeded by Pam Fredman
Other offices
First	President of Innventia AB; 2006-2011	Succeeded by Birgitta Sundblad
