= Lalya Gaye =

Swiss digital media artist

- Born: 1978 (age 47–48); Geneva, Switzerland
- Education: University of Geneva, KTH Royal Institute of Technology, University of Gothenburg
- Known for: interactive art, locative media, digital art, interaction design
- Website: lalyagaye.com

Lalya Gaye (born 1978) is a Switzerland born digital media artist and interaction designer whose early work was influential in the field of locative media. While living in Newcastle upon Tyne, UK, she founded and directed the international and interdisciplinary digital art and design practice Attaya Projects.

== Early life ==
Lalya Gaye was born in Geneva, Switzerland in 1978, the daughter of a Senegalese-Malian father and a Swedish mother (both International Labour Office officials), and the youngest of 8 children on her father's side. Her father was trade unionist Abdou Salam Gaye - a key figure in the African Trade Union Movement - and her mother is a feminist human rights activist. She was classically trained as a dancer in her youth and has been DJing since her teens.

== Education and career ==
Mostly active as a digital media artist, Lalya also has a background in engineering, physics and interaction design, and extensive experience in interdisciplinary collaborations, academic and practical teaching, as well as project management.

She received a B.Sc. in Physics at the University of Geneva, Switzerland in 1999, and a M.Sc.Eng. in Electroacoustics at the Royal Institute of Technology (KTH) in Stockholm, Sweden in 2002. She first started an art and design research career at the research group Future Applications Lab, Viktoria Institute, in Gothenburg, in Gothenburg, Sweden - a research lab in Interaction Design, Ubiquitous Computing, Mobile Technology and Human-Computer Interaction. While in Gothenburg, she also worked on a PhD in Applied Information Technology at the University of Gothenburg, taught at the Interaction Design programme at Chalmers University of Technology, was a founding member of the Swedish art group Dånk! Collective and freelanced for organisations including Medialab-Prado.

== Work ==
While a researcher at the Future Applications Lab (2002-2006), Lalya was at the forefront of locative media arts and interactive music research. Notable projects include the pioneering locative media arts project Sonic City, Tejp, and Context Photography. She was also active in the field as a steering committee member of the International Mobile Music Workshops series (one of the main locative media arts festivals and conferences of the time), as a member of the 'metareviewer' (editorial) program committee of the 2006 NIME conference, the leading conference on alternative musical interfaces, and through co-running dorkbot-gbg, the Gothenburg branch of the international dorkbot movement.

While at Culture Lab (2010-2012), her research focused on designing for creative uses of digital technology for social inclusion and community work, and resulted in an AHRC-funded conference, an exhibition as co-curator and a book as co-editor about Connected Communities.

Lalya Gaye has exhibited, lectured and performed internationally. Her work - as well as the work produced by her digital media arts practice Attaya Projects - has been featured at the NIME conference, Dokufest, Ulster Bank Belfast International Arts Festival, the DLI Museum & Art Gallery, Brass International Festival and Northern Design Festival among other places. Her work has received grants from among others the AHRC and Arts Council England, has been commissioned by international festivals such as Festival of Lights (Lyon), and has received extensive press coverage through the years. Attaya Projects was featured in both 2014 and 2015 in the Hannah Directory of "people doing great things in the North of England" as one of the best creative practices in the North of England.

== Notable projects ==
=== Sonic City ===
Sonic City (2002–2004) was a locative media art project that explored mobile interaction and wearable technology for generating music in everyday life. The project was led by Lalya Gaye (while at the Viktoria Institute) and Ramia Mazé (while at The Interactive Institute), and included wearable artist Margot Jacobs (also at The Interactive Institute) as well as sound-artist Daniel Skoglund from 8Tunnel2. Turning the urban environment into a digital music interface while walking through it, Sonic City was one of the pioneer projects of the mobile music field and contributed to establishing it. The project has been well-published and well-cited in academia, received a lot of attention in the new media arts scene, and has received extensive media and blog coverage. Among other places, Sonic City was presented at e.g. NIME and Cybersonica, and was demoed EU's IST 2004 event in The Hague as an example of innovative European research. It was featured in the Leonardo Electronic Almanac special issue on locative media, and discussed in a number of books and leading publications about sound, technology and urban space as a "classic" in terms of digital technology and sound creatively redefining public space.

=== Locative media projects ===
- Tejp (2003-2004): Tejp was a series of low-tech design experiments that explored various means of overlaying and revealing personal digital traces in public spaces. Borrowing from notions of media parasiting and situationist détournement, physical urban infrastructures were used as intrinsic parts of the technology. Experiments included "audio tags" placed on walls, which whispered messages to by-passers as they leaned towards it, and radio antennas extended by metallic urban infrastructures that amplified and revealed layers of mobile phone communications in urban space. This project was co-produced with Margot Jacobs from The Interactive Institute.
- Context Photography (2004): A collaboration with researchers Maria Håkansson and Sara Ljungblad, this design research project produced a series of augmented digital cameras, in which sensor data impacted on the visual of photographs as they were being taken.

=== Art installations ===
- Yellooooow Splitch* (2008): Yellow Splitch was a touring light and sound installation by architecture resp. art collectives Metipolis and Dånk! Collective, first commissioned by the Festival of Lights (Lyon) 2008. Its first incarnation consisted of 5000 transparent cups that hanged over a dark alley in the centre of Lyon, France. These were filled with a fluorescent solution that glowed in the night in sync with the rhythm and spatiality of a generative soundscape. The installation was re-created in August 2009 for the Flow Festival in Helsinki, Finland and in November 2011 for the Julstaden light festival in Gothenburg, Sweden, and the Luci (Lighting Urban Community International) meeting. It was the first light-based art installation to ever use dynamic UV light or “black” light.
- Arbre à Palabre (2009): A temporary 3D street-art installation dedicated to local immigrant communities in Providence, RI, USA. By referencing the widespread tradition of painted white tree trunks, the piece “teleported” a simple detail of foreign everyday life – which happens to be shared by all of the local immigrants' countries of origin – into their current reality. Made of steel yet disjointed as if prone to radio interferences, it reflected the anchored yet stretched nature of migration. Augmented with an audio transducer that turned its metallic structure into a large scale street-speaker that vibrated to the sound of foreign music, it also acted as an audio link to distant soundscapes. This piece – the first of a series on the theme of ‘diaspora’ and ‘home’ was realised as part of Lalya's artist residency at Rhode Island School of Design, in collaboration with The Steel Yard and with the support of the local neighbourhood association. In 2012, this piece awarded Lalya Gaye a feature in Stigmart/10 Annual Review of Contemporary Arts as one of the 10 most promising contemporary artists under the age of 34.
- Cycles of Brass (2014): A visual and sound installation co-produced with Swedish artists Alexander Berman and Filip Strebeyko, in which two brass instruments suspended in separate transparent water tanks are exposed to opposite transformative chemical reactions; one progressively decaying, and the other being progressively restored throughout a period of three months. These processes are translated into an abstract brass soundscape that changes in parallel with the instruments using sensor and sound processing technology. This installation was commissioned by Brass:Pitch, the digital media art programme at the Durham Brass International Festival, and co-funded by the Arts Council England and the Swedish Arts Grants Committee. It was on view at the DLI Art Gallery in Durham, UK, for 3 months, during which the piece was gradually changing, both visually and sonically. It was also featured on the popular blog about creative digital technologies, Creative Applications
- Oh My Home - Lost & Found (2015): A public space installation, series of workshops and set of performances realised with artists Saadia Hussain and Ixone Ormaetxe and touring across Europe between 2015 and 2017. This piece address the notion of “home” from a broad perspective: the domestic, the migrant and the contested, as part of the European experience, through the use of a large number of activated "immigrant bags" taking over public spaces. This piece is part of the EU's Creative Europe programme Corners. It has been presented at Kosovo's Dokufest festival, Ulster Bank Belfast International Arts Festival, as well as featured in Swedish, Kosovar and Northern Irish media (national television and local press).

== Other work ==
Lalya Gaye was an executive member on the board of the Artists' Union England - the first and only union representing visual artists in England.
