= Acer Predator 21X =

High-end gaming laptop by Acer

- Developer: Acer
- Type: Gaming laptop / desktop replacement computer
- Released: 2017
- Introductory price: $8,999.99 / €9,999
- Units shipped: 300 or 500
- Operating system: Windows 10 Home
- CPU: Intel Core i7-7820HK Quad-core 2.9 GHz unlocked
- Memory: 64 GB DDR4 SDRAM @ 2400 MHz
- Storage: 2x 512 GB SSDs in RAID 0 (two slots in NVMe) + 1x 2.5-inch SATA III 7200 RPM HDD
- Display: 21" 2560 x 1080p 120 Hz curved G-Sync IPS
- Graphics: Two Nvidia GeForce GTX 1080 (8 GB VRAM each) in SLI
- Sound: Six speakers (two tweeters, two midrange, two subwoofers)
- Input: HDMI, DisplayPort, 4 USB 3.0 ports, a USB-C/Thunderbolt 3 port, Ethernet RJ-45, 3.5mm audio jack, 3.5mm microphone jack, SD card reader
- Camera: Yes, with additional cameras for Tobii eye tracking
- Touchpad: Yes, detachable
- Power: 8-cell non-removable Li-Ion battery, two separate 330W power bricks
- Dimensions: 568 mm × 314.5 mm × 68.8 mm–83.25 mm (22.362 in × 12.382 in × 2.709 in–3.278 in)
- Weight: 8.5 kg (19 lb)
- Website: Official website (archived)

The Acer Predator 21X is a limited-edition enthusiast gaming laptop that was developed, manufactured and marketed by Acer Inc. and released under their gaming brand Acer Predator in 2017 for a list price of $8,999.99 in the United States and €9,999 in Europe. It was first presented at the IFA Berlin in 2016. Depending on the source, only 300 or 500 units have been produced worldwide. It is the first laptop with a curved screen.

== Hardware ==
The Acer Predator 21X weighs 8.5 kg (19 lb) and has a 21 in (53 cm) curved panel with a refresh rate of 120 Hz and a screen format of 21:9 while having a resolution of 2560 x 1080 pixels (Wide Full HD) which supports Nvidia's G-Sync technology. It has an overclocked Intel Core i7-7820HK and two GeForce GTX 1080 GPUs working in Scalable Link Interface (SLI) as well as 64 GB of DDR4 RAM clocked at 2400 mHz distributed over 4 memory sticks. It also features a full mechanical keyboard with Cherry MX Brown switches positioned at the front edge of the laptop as well as eye tracking technology developed by Tobii. Its list price is $8,999,99 in the United States and €9,999 in Europe. Two solid state drives (SSDs) with 512 GB capacity each as well as a 1 TB hard disk drive (HDD) are pre-installed; the storage is expandable. The laptop has 4 built-in speakers, providing stereo sound, as well as two subwoofers. It has five fans and nine heat pipes and comes with two power supplies.

== Reception ==
The Verge described the 21X in their review as "overkill", stating that "It's a trophy for anyone who buys it, a status symbol of having the biggest and best thing out there".

PCMag stated that: "Though it costs as much as a decent used car, the Acer Predator 21 X shows how much performance and how many features you can get if you cram every possible high-end component into a gaming laptop."

LaptopMag praised the laptop for its "stunning design", performance, curved display, keyboard, and built-in eye-tracking function, though they criticized it for its price, lack of an option with a 4K display, and audio.

Tom's Hardware found the built quality of the device to be "outstanding" and liked its mechanical keyboard as well as its color-accurate display. They stated that the 21X offers "the best performance found on a gaming laptop", but criticized the "outrageous price" and "extremely poor battery life".

The German online magazine Chip described the laptop as a "10,000 euro monster", praising its two GTX 1080 graphics cards, large curved display, and gaming-optimized eye-tracking, but criticizing its high price and weight.

TechRadar called the 21X "the world’s most powerful gaming laptop", stating that, "while the price tag is likely to be far too much for most people, there’s still a lot to admire about this machine." The magazine praised the performance, cooling system, and "easy to use software" of the 21X, while criticizing its cost, weight, short battery life, and "bulky design".

PC Games Hardware referred to the 21X as "the desktop replacement of all desktop replacements", praising its cooling solution and case mod bond options. However, they criticized the lack of a HDR-capable display and the display resolution, which is "a little undersized for our taste".

CNET praised the "immersive" 21-inch curved display, the mechanical keyboard, which is "excellent for gaming", and that "[t]here are a ton of fun features and extras, including a reversible touch/number pad, eye tracking cameras and swappable WASD keys. The battery life and display resolution received criticism, as well as the price–performance ratio as "[e]ven these high-end components don't fully justify the price."
