= Danny Sveinson =

Daniel Sveinson
- Born: 1993 (age 32–33); Surrey, British Columbia, Canada
- Genres: Rock|progressive rock
- Occupation: Guitarist
- Instrument: Guitar

Daniel Sveinson (born 4 May 1993 in Surrey, British Columbia), is a Canadian guitarist. He was the subject of the 2006 CBC documentary entitled The Rock and Roll Kid.

== Biography ==
Daniel began performing when he was 10 as "The Rock and Roll Kid". He was touted as a guitar prodigy, performing as the closing act for the Telus World Ski and Snowboarding Festival and at the Commodore Ballroom in Vancouver, where he opened for Colin James. He has also made appearances on Breakfast Television, Urban Rush, The Vicky Gabereau Show, The Mike Bullard Show, as well as on MTV and YTV. Releasing his debut album in early 2004, Daniel was the subject of the front cover and feature story in the 25 November 2004 issue of The Georgia Straight, a weekly entertainment paper in Vancouver, in which he was proclaimed to be "A Guitar God in Training" and shortly after performed at New York's Apollo Theater as a guest on Showtime at the Apollo.

The Rock and Roll Kid premiered to three sell-out audiences at the Vancouver International Film Festival in September 2006. It won the "best documentary" award at the Leo Awards.

He formed Sonic City in 2005 and they toured in Canada twice, opening for Jeff Martin, The Trews and April Wine. After their split in 2006 he formed the rock group Mad Shadow, who in 2013 released the album Heavy Blues.

In late 2017 Daniel began performing with as a solo artist with a group called Daniel James' Brass Camel. This act would lead to the formation of the band Brass Camel in 2019 who have released two studio albums to date, 2022's Brass and 2025's Camel.
