= John Elvesjo =

Swedish entrepreneur and inventor

John Elvesjö
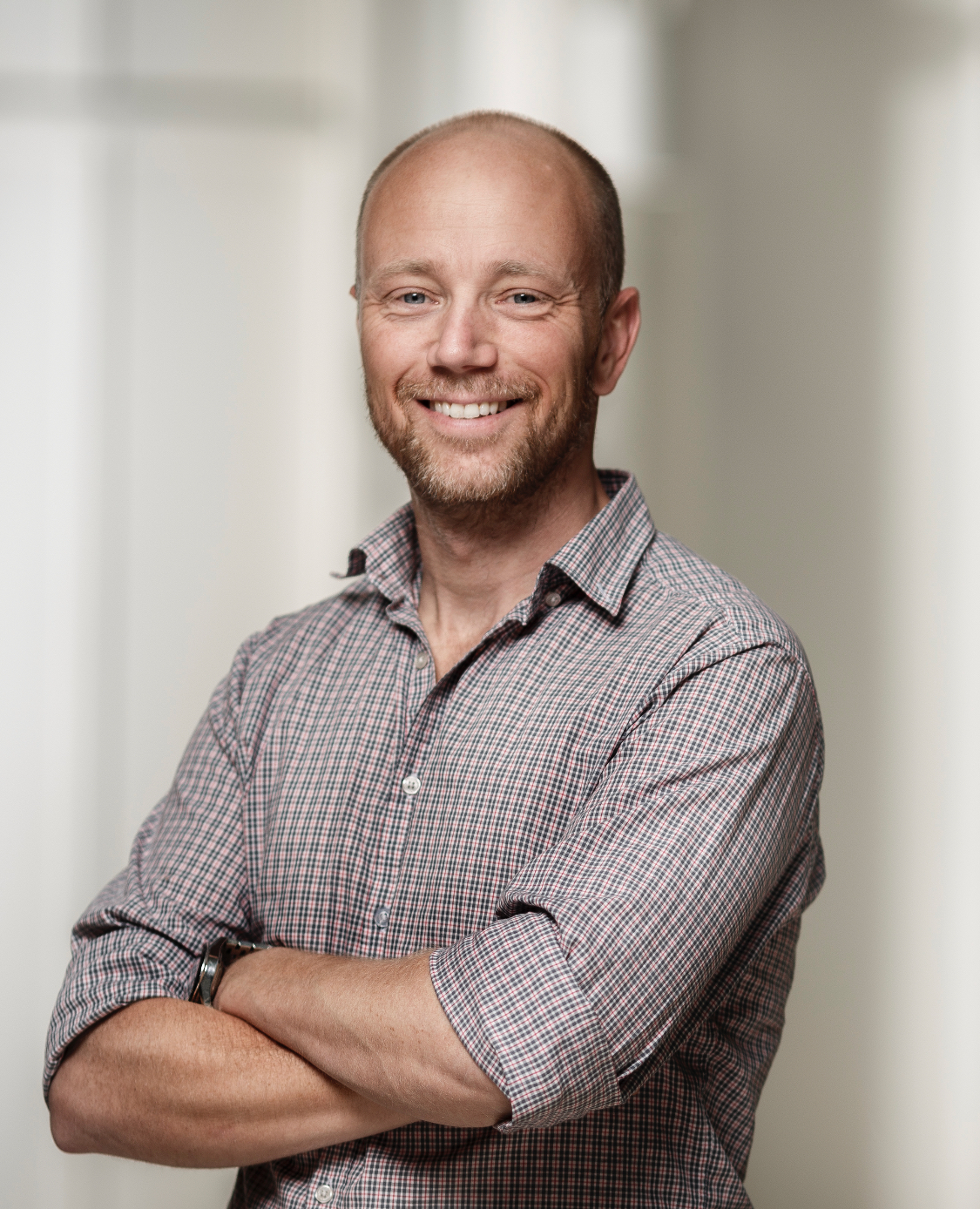
- Elvesjö in 2018
- Born: John Mikael Holtz Elvesjö; 1977 (age 48–49); Sweden
- Education: Royal Institute of Technology
- Occupations: Venture capital, investor and technology entrepreneur
- Organization: Brightly Ventures
- Known for: Technology, entrepreneur and inventor

John Mikael Holtz Elvesjö (born 19 September 1977) is a Swedish entrepreneur and inventor.

Elvesjö studied Engineering Physics at the Royal Institute of Technology in Stockholm. he was at Företagsekonomiska Institutet, for a Course in professional Board Work and Legal education for board members.

He left Tobii as a Chief Technical Officer and former deputy chief executive officer, co-founder at Tobii technology. He is now at Brightly Ventures as a Managing Partner.

== Biography ==
Born Holtz, John Elvesjö took his mother's maiden name at the age of 18 when his father died.

He founded his first company in 1999, Jenser Technology, which was a spin-off from the Institute of Surface Chemistry and based on his previous research there. In 1995, Elvesjö was recruited by Henrik Eskilsson as the first employee of Trampolinspecialisten. Elvesjö, Henrik Eskilsson and Marten Skogö founded a new company in 2001 which was named after John's nephew Tobias Elvesjö who, at the age of 2 years old, struggled to pronounce his nickname Tobbe, and instead said Tobii.

Elvesjö is currently a Managing Partner at Brightly Ventures.

The eye-tracking was developed by inventors Elvesjö and Mårten Skogö. Eye-tracking is a tool or instrument that served as a mouth, touchedscreen or pad of a computer system. It is like an eye glass of a human beings that carries the functions of a mouth, pad and touched screen.

=== Brightly Ventures AB ===
In 2018, Elvesjö took up office as a Managing Partner of Brightly Ventures AB. He

Founded Brightly Ventures together with three co-founders, an early-stage Nordic venture firm based in Stockholm, investinin e technology teams and companie . The fund, raised in 2018, of 551MSEK closed for new investments in Sept. 2021.

=== Tobii AB (Publ.) ===
From 2001 – 2018 Elvesjö was a Co-CEO and Chief Technology Officer of Tobi AB (Publ.). He Founded the company, together with two co-founders, based on his own research work from 1999 to 2001. Built a +1000 employee (350 R&D staff) high tech company including responsibility for investor relations and M&A, raising ~200MUSD in venture capital and leading the acquisition of eight companies. Co-CEO during all years. Group CTO and R&D-manager from founding until end of 2015. Representing the founders as Director on the Board from founding until June 2019.

=== Jenser Technology AB ===
Elvesjö was the CEO of Jenser Technology AB from 1999 to 2003. He Founded Jenser Technology as a spin-off from the Institute of Surface Chemistry based on own research. In the year 2001 the company got an award in the Environmental Innovation Competition. The company was acquired by KSV NIMA / Biolin Scientific in 2003.

=== Institute for Surface Chemistry (YKI) ===
Elvesjö was a Researcher and Project Manager at Institute for Surface Chemistry (YKI) From 1998 to 2000. He contributed significantly with mathematics and innovation to the development of several measuring instruments and sensors including the sensors further developed and commercialized by Jenser Technology and Tobii.

== Scholarships, grants and publications ==
- John, Elvesjö (September, 03, 2012) "Technology with a Vision" World Economic Forum

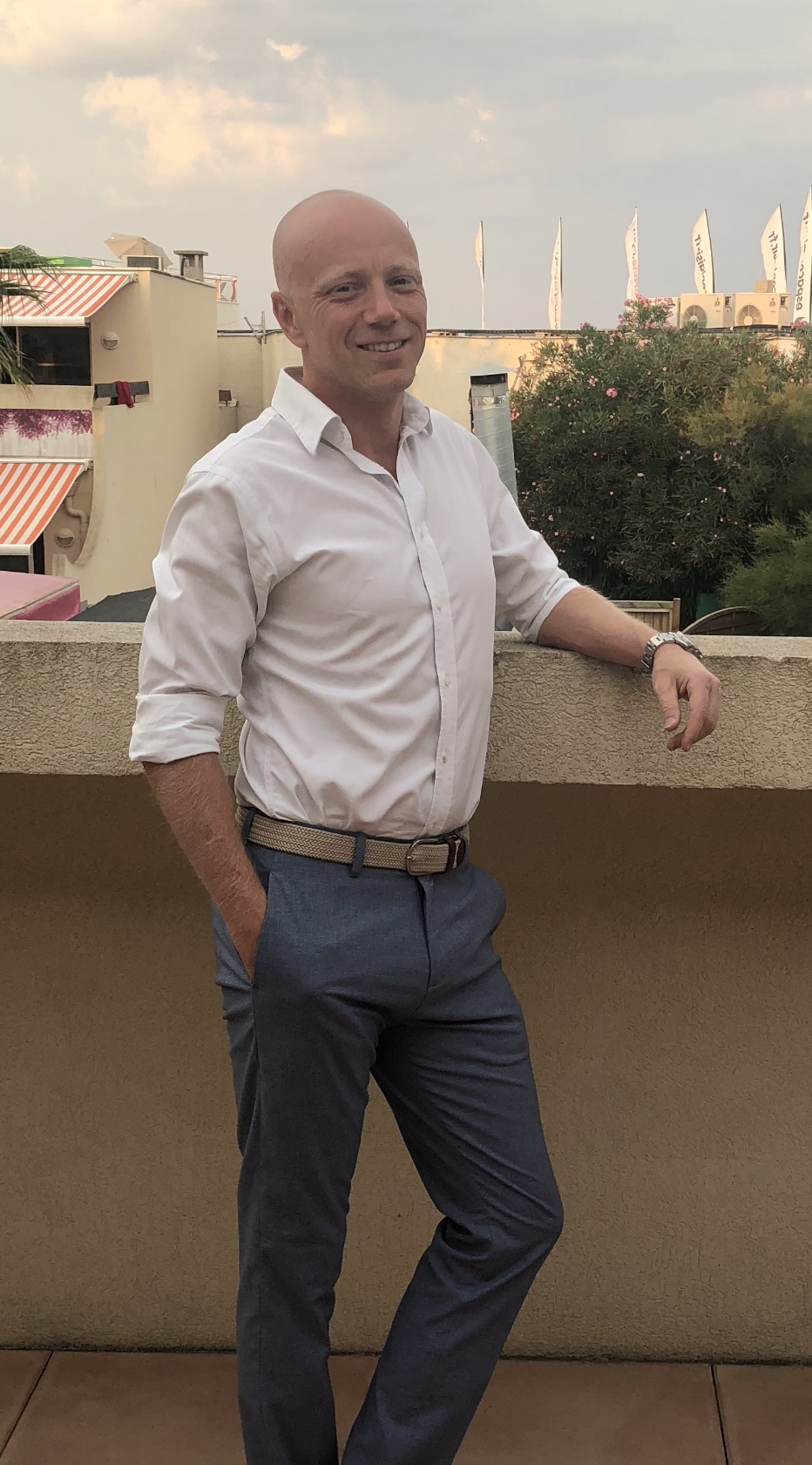
Elvesjö in 2021

- John, Elvesjö (21 April 2015) Changing the World in the Blink of an Eye
- System and methods for controlling automatic scrolling of information on a display or screen
- 1998 – 2018 Authored and co-authored 40 or more patents/applications and scientific publications
- 2000 Stockholms Stads Uppfinnarstipendium – First prize
- 2001 MiljöInnovationsPriset – First Prize with Mårten Skogö for a method of optimizing detergent dosage by measuring surface tension
- 2002 SKAPA Stipendiet – Grant of SEK 25,000

=== Selected publications ===
Skogö M, et al. Power efficient image sensing apparatus, method of operating the same and eye/gaze tracking system. CA2848641A1 Elvesjö J. Intelligent user mode selection in an eye-tracking system. US20140313129A1  Skogö M, et al. Gaze-controlled user interface with multimodal input. US20140354539A1  Elvesjö J. Computer graphics presentation systems and methods. US20140320531A1  Elvesjö J, et al. Method and installation for detecting and following an eye and the gaze direction thereof. WO2004045399A1  Skogö M, et al. Method and instrument for measuring surface tension. US7266995B2   

== Awards and honors ==
- 2015, Finalists for the European inventor. Awards
- 2005 Entrepreneur of the Year Award (ALMI)
- 2007 Ranked number three of "up comers 2007" (Sweden's men and women under 40 most likely to influence the future) by Shortcut magazine
- 2008 Honored as "IT-Renewer of the Year" by Chef magazine and Teliasonera
- 2015 awarded Polhemspriset by Sveriges Ingenjörer
- Awards given to businesses based on John's innovations include "Swedish Electronics Company of the Year", Deloitte "Fastest Growing Technology Company in Sweden" and "Fast 50 award" several years, Microsoft "Ingenuity Point" Winner, "World Class Company" and "Export Hermes" appointment by the Stockholm Chamber of Commerce, "Swedish IT Company of the Year", the "Golden Mouse" award by Affärsvärlden and Computer Sweden and first prize in the "Environmental Innovation Competition".

== Membership ==
- 2022 Member of the board of directors at Swedish Space Corporation
- 2018 Board of directors and Managing Partner at Brightly Ventures
- 2018 Board member of directors of Tobii
- 2011 Board member at consumer electronics form Mutewatch
- 2011 Board member at cloud computing firm Xcerion
- 2010–13 Advisory board member at Stockholm Innovation and Growth
- 2019 Board member at Yabie
- 2019 Board member at Wehype
- 2016 – 2021 Board member at Vinnova
- 2015 –2018 Board Member / Advisor at Resolution Games
- 2016 – 2018 Board member at Moor Capita

== Sources ==
- Tomas Zirn, "Idén föddes en kväll på labbet," Computer Sweden 27 October 2009 (in Swedish)
- Tomas Zirn, "John Elvesjö – med näsa för affärer," Computer Sweden 27 October 2009 (in Swedish)
- Klas Andersson, "De gör datorn till en ögontjänare," Svenska Dagbladet 22 July 2008 (in Swedish)
