= Sonic City =

Realised between 2002 and 2004, the project Sonic City was pioneer projects in locative media, in particular the mobile music field which it contributed in establishing.

Sonic City was a form of interactive music instrument using the city as an interface. It enabled people to individually create a real-time personal soundscape of electronic music by walking through and interacting with urban environments. Paths turned into musical compositions and mobility through the shifting contexts of a city became a large scale musical gesture.

Worn on the body, Sonic City retrieved information about environmental context and user actions in real time, and mapped it to the live audio processing of urban sounds, resulting in music heard through headphones. One engaged into a musical duet with the city: urban atmospheres, nearby urban artefacts, random encounters, and everyday activities all participated in creating music as you were walking.

At the cross-road between urban exploration and experimental music making, Sonic City promoted the integration of everyday life settings and practices into personal forms of aesthetic expression with digital technology.

== Partnerships ==
The Sonic City project was a collaboration between The Interactive Institute (Ramia Mazé and Margot Jacobs) and Future Applications Lab at the Viktoria Institute (Lalya Gaye), together with established Swedish sound-artist Daniel Skoglund (8Tunnel2). Lalya Gaye and Ramia Mazé initiated and managed the project. Magnus Johansson and Sara Lerén (University of Gothenburg) conducted their master's theses in the project.

Sonic City was partially funded through the Smart-Its project (as part of the Disappearing Computer FET-IST research programme) and the Mobile Life project (funded by the Swedish Foundation for Strategic Research) at the Viktoria Institute. At The Interactive Institute, Sonic City was included in the Public Play Spaces research platform.

== Press and publication ==
The project has been well-published and well-cited in academia, received a lot of attention in the new media arts scene, and has received extensive media and blog coverage. Among other places, Sonic City was presented at e.g. NIME and Cybersonica, and was demoed EU’s IST 2004 event in The Hague as an example of innovative European research. It was featured in the Leonardo Electronic Almanac special issue on locative media, and discussed in a number of books and leading publications about sound, technology and urban space as a "classic" in terms of digital technology and sound creatively redefining public space.
