= Henry Radamson =

Swedish professor of microelectronics

- Citizenship: Swedish
- Known for: Semiconductor devices
- Awards: International Innovation Award by SIQ (2019) - Stockholm's Venture Cup for thermal semiconductor device (2018)

Academic background
- Education: Doctor of Philosophy (PhD) in Semiconductor Physics
- Alma mater: Linköping University

Academic work
- Discipline: Semiconductor Physics - Thermoelectric nanowires
- Sub-discipline: Microelectronics; Nanoelectronics
- Institutions: Chinese Academy of Sciences, Royal Institute of Technology Mid Sweden University
- Notable works: Multilayered Thermistor Structure - Short Wave Infra Red Camera Chip

Henry H. Radamson is a Swedish professor of microelectronics known for his contribution to semiconductor devices and his invention, Multilayered Thermistor Structure.

Radamson teaches and conducts research within the field of semiconductor physics at different universities and research centers in Sweden (Royal Institute of Technology professor of Photonics and Microwave Engineering at the school of Information and Communications Technology, heading the Laboratory of Photonics and Microwave Engineering) and Mid Sweden University, Department of Electronics Design), China (Institute of Microelectronics, Chinese Academy of Sciences) , and the United States (Texas Instruments, Semiconductor Research Corporation).

== Background ==
Henry H. Radamson received an M.Sc. degree in physics and the Ph.D. degree in semiconductor materials from Linköping University in Sweden, in 1989 and 1996, respectively. From 1982 to 1992 he was employed by the networking company Ericsson. In 1997, he joined the Royal Institute of Technology in Stockholm as a senior scientist, where he has been an Associate Professor 2001-2016. He was appointed a professor of the Chinese Academy of Sciences in 2016. Radamson has been also a visiting professor at Mid Sweden University since 2018.

He was awarded International Innovation Award by SIQ, the Swedish Institute for Quality in 2018. He co-founded a hi-tech spin-off in the course of his professorship at KTH. where he is mainly focused on silicon/silicon germanium devices and process technology for MOSFETs, HBTs, and thermal sensors.

== Career and media coverage ==
His work on semiconductors with potential application in hi-tech future devices and corresponding recognition have been extensively covered in Swedish media. Radamson's breakthrough research such as the manufacturing of Tensile-strained germanium on insulator has been also covered by Chinese media.

== Scholarly contribution ==
In addition to publication of more than 200 scholarly articles, that were cited by +1700 other research work, he authored the book 'Monolithic Nanoscale Photonics-Electronics Integration in Silicon and Other Group IV Elements' published by Elsevier Science in 2014, later turned to be a standard text within the field. He also co-authored the book 'CMOS Past, Present and Future' published by Elsevier Science in 2018. Radamson is a member of the editorial board of journals and scientific board of conferences within electronic science and technology including Journal of Electronic Materials.

== See also ==
- Nanoelectronics
- Semiconductor
- Microelectronics
- Semiconductor device
