= Student Union in Sundsvall =

- The logo of the Student Union in Sundsvall
- Abbreviation: SKS
- Formation: 1977
- Type: Student union
- Location: (Sweden) Sundsvall
- Coordinates: 62.3943°N 17.283967°E
- Official language: Swedish, English
- President: Rickard Läth
- Vice President: Reza Moossavi
- Website: www.sks.miun.se

Student Union in Sundsvall at Mid Sweden University is a students' union representing students studying on campus Sundsvall at Mid Sweden University, and those distance students who are registered in Sundsvall. This includes all the bachelor's, Master's and doctoral students as well as exchange students and visiting students.

== Organization ==
=== Members Meeting ===
Members meeting (in Swedish:Kårmöte) is the student union's highest governing body. Members meeting is an open meeting, meaning that all the students are entitled to attend but only the members are entitled to vote. The members meeting meets three times a year. At these meetings, the members decide on strategic issues such as student union statutes, regulations and policies. At November's meeting (that also counts as the annual meeting) they also decide the budget and business plan for the coming fiscal year.

=== The Student Union's Board ===
The board, is the union's highest executive body between the members meetings. The members of the board are appointed by direct vote of the students in the spring. An Election Committee which is formed by volunteer students, directs the elections in which all union members have voting rights. The board is responsible to implement the decisions taken at members meeting and is supposed to give a report to members meeting about the union activities. The board is also responsible for the union's economy in terms of budgeting and budget tracking. The issues that are too urgent to be dealt with in members meeting, are taken care of by The board. The members should represent a diversity of gender, age and education area. The board is headed by a president who is assisted with a vice president. Both president and vice president are elected by direct votes. In The board may sit up to 13 members, including the president and the vice president. The board meets monthly.

=== Presidium ===
Presidium is a generic term for president and vice president. Presidium is responsible for leading the board's meeting, running the daily operations, working on educational issues and representing students in different administrative bodies such as the university board, the Rector's decision meeting and the management council of the Mid Sweden University. The Presidium term of missions is one year and the assignment are full-time remunerated.

=== The President ===
President's mission is to lead the Student Union as an organization and be a student union's public face. The president has official contact with the municipality, businesses, organizations, agencies, government and parliament. President is also responsible for the student union advocacy. The president is a member of Mid Sweden University's board of directors, member of the disciplinary board, member and chairman of the Students' Scholarship Foundation and owner's representative in Sundsvall Students Kårhus AB.

=== The Vice President ===
Vice president's mission is to be the president's deputy and also to work with quality of education, union issues and student welfare issues. Vice president is substitution for the president in the board of Sundsvall Students Kårhus AB.

=== Committees ===
Student Union in Sundsvall has two committees:

- International Committee

The International Student Committee is the branch of the student union that focuses on the well being of the international students at Mid Sweden University. For instance, the Committee organizes welcome events at the beginning of the semester. During the semester they organize different social activities. They also provid supporting fellow student for all exchange students at Mid Sweden University. The role of the fellow student varies, but they usually meet the exchange students on the arrival day and help them get settled in. The committee's body is made up of both Swedish and foreign students. The committee works with:
- Induction and mentoring of the arriving international students.
- Providing help for the arriving international students with problems they might encounter within the University and the Swedish society.
- Improving the integration between Swedish and international students.

- Doctoral Committee

Doctoral Committee organizes postgraduate students in Sundsvall. Doctoral Committee is supposed to be a forum for postgraduate students, with the mandate to appoint their representatives who will represent them in various university bodies and committees, such as an institution board or faculty boards.

== Activities ==
The student union should be seen as a professional organization for students in Sundsvall. Union activities are regulated in the business plan for the year and is determined by the students at the annual members meeting.

== Student associations ==
In addition to the committees, there are also a number of associations working with the Student union in Sundvall.

Study field associations in Sundsvall

These are the associations which one can join based on the program or field of study. Student union in Sundsvall has 6 study field assicitions:

- Commit; for students who study the information and public relations program, Graphic Design, Communication or Media and Communication Studies.
- Emboli; is for the students of health science and nursing. Emboli is an abbreviation of the Swedish words for Empathy (in Swedish, Empati), Humanity (in Swedish, Medmänsklighet), Treatment (in Swedish, Behandling), Nursing (in Swedish, Omvårdnad), Quality of Life (in Swedish, Livskvalitet) and Integrity (in Swedish, Integritet).
- JFS, Journalist Association in Sundsvall (in Swedish, Journalistföreningen i Sundsvall); for the student och journalism and photojournalism.
- μtec (sometimes written and pronounced as MyTec), Sundsvall's Technology Student Association (in Swedish, Sundsvalls Teknologers Förening);or all the students taking technology courses at Mid Sweden University.
- Sundekon, Sundsvall's Economics Association (in Swedish, Sundsvalls Ekonomförening); the oldest and most traditional association in Sundsvall. Open to all those who are enrolled in any branch of economics.
- SUS, Sundvsall's Social Science Association (in Swedish, Sundsvalls Samhällsvetare); for those who study economics, sociology or political science.

Student Associations in Sundsvall

These associations are not related to the field of study. Some are open to everyone while others require certain conditions for being a member.

- Borstmästeriet; a party association in Sundsvall, founded in 1995.
- Credo; Christian students association.
- Gungner; Student choir in Sundsvall.
- MIFS; Mid Sweden University's Sports Association in Sundsvall (in Swedish, Mittuniversitetets Idrottsförenin i Sundsvall).
- MINK; Mid Sweden University Network for Women (in Swedish, Mittuniversitetets Nätverk för Kvinnor.
- S.Å.S; Sundsvall's Overall Society (in Swedish, Sundsvalls Åverållsällskap).
- Yequi; The Chinese Culture Disseminators Association.

== Presidium Alumni ==
Every September, a new presidium takes over the Student Union in Sundsvall and works for a year. The people who have been working in presidium in different years are:

Presidents

- 2017-18: Olof Bäckman
- 2016-17: Rickard Läth (Reza Moossavi as acting from Feb. 2017)
- 2015-16: Rickard Läth
- 2014-15: Rickard Läth
- 2013-14: Joachim Sjövall
- 2012-13: Joachim Sjövall
- 2011–12: Joachim Sjövall
- 2010–11: Minna Söreling
- 2009–10: Chako Aliyar
- 2008–09: Robert Thunfors
- 2007–08: Magnus Runsten
- 2006–07: Jonas Lostelius

Vice Presidents

- 2017-18: Åse Mathisen
- 2016-17: Reza Moossavi
- 2015-16: Reza Moossavi
- 2014-15: Reza Moossavi
- 2013-14: Rickard Läth
- 2012-13: Beatrice Claesson
- 2011–12: Diana Krantz
- 2010–11: Diana Krantz
- 2009–10: Minna Söreling
- 2008–09: Jennie Helgsten Rosenholm
- 2007–08: Åsa Granberg
- 2006–07: Per Steiner

== See also ==
- Student Union in Härnösand
- Student Union in Östersund
- Swedish National Union of Students
