= Juri Kurol =

Estonian-born Swedish orthodontist (1942–2011)

Dr. Juri Kurol (1942–2011) was a Swedish orthodontist who was the president of the European Federation of Orthodontic Specialists Association until 2002. He is known for his contributions made in the field of orthodontics related to diagnosing and evaluating the eruption pattern of maxillary canines.

== Life ==
He was born in Estonia in 1942. He moved to Ängelholm in Sweden at the age of two and finished his high schooling there in 1961. He attended Karolinska Institutet and earned his dental degree from there in 1966. Before starting his orthodontic residency, he enrolled himself in the Dental Public Health Service in Ljungbyholm, Sweden. He received his masters certificate in orthodontics from the University of Gothenburg in 1972. In 1984, he attained his PhD and became an associate professor a year later at the University of Goteborg. He then served as the chairman of the Orthodontic Department at the Institute for Postgraduate Dental Education in Jönköping from 1985 to 1997.

He retired in 2004.

== Orthodontics ==
Kurol did his research in disorders about the erupting pattern of human canine and molar teeth. He developed classifications to recognize the different eruption patterns of these teeth. In his lifetime, he published over 100 articles and wrote many textbook chapters.

== Awards and positions ==
- 1997 - Sheldon Friel Memorial Lecture Award, European Orthodontic Society
- 1988–2003 - Board of Swedish Association of Orthodontists, President
- 1998–2002 - European Federation of Orthodontic Specialists Association, President
