= Swerea =

Swedish research group

Swerea AB
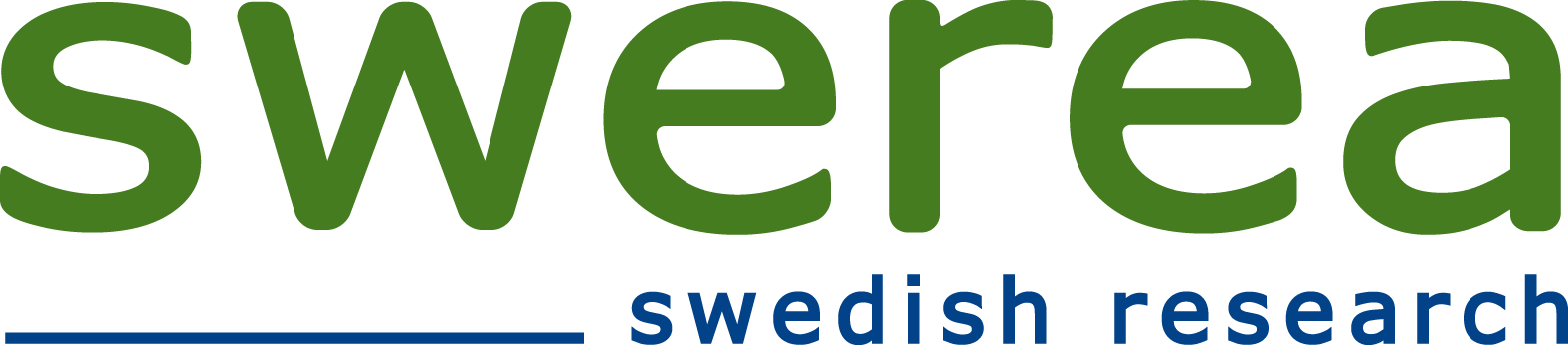
- Company type: Research group
- Industry: Research, Materials science
- Founded: 2005
- Headquarters: Kista, Stockholm region, Sweden
- Key people: Peter Samuelsson; Chairman; Göran Carlsson; Group CEO
- Revenue: ▲700 million SEK (2017)
- Net income: ▲18,2 million SEK (2017)
- Owners: Research Institutes of Sweden (RISE) owns 43%, and five owner associations fem owns 57%; The Interest Association for Corrosion Research, Metallurgiska Forskningsbolaget i Luleå, Stiftelsen Svensk Järn- och Metallforskning, Swerea IVFs industry group, and Swedish foundry association
- Number of employees: 536 (2017)
- Subsidiaries: Swerea IVF, Swerea KIMAB, Swerea MEFOS, Swerea SWECAST, Swerea SICOMP
- Website: www.swerea.se/en

Swerea was a Swedish research group specialising in applied scientific research in materials development, production and product development. The group operated mainly in Sweden for industry with operations in Sweden, but also owns the Corrosion Institute in France. The Swerea group consisted of five research institutes: Swerea IVF, Swerea KIMAB, Swerea MEFOS, Swerea SWECAST and Swerea SICOMP. Office locations were Kista (Stockholm), Luleå, Piteå, Mölndal (Gothenburg), Jönköping, Linköping, Eskilstuna, Trollhättan, Oslo, St Etienne och Brest.

October 1, 2018 Research Institutes of Sweden (RISE) acquired two-thirds of the research group, including Swerea IVF, Swerea SICOMP, Swerea SWECAST and the corrosion area of Swerea KIMAB. These companies now make up the RISE division Materials and Production and has subsequently changed name to RISE IVF, RISE SICOMP, RISE SWECAST and RISE KIMAB.

MEFOS and the remaining part of Swerea KIMAB launched a new research institute, Swerim, with a focus on mining, mineral, steel and metal research, partly owned by RISE.

== Ownership ==
RISE Research Institutes of Sweden is now the sole owner of Swerea AB who in turn owns the companies Swerea IVF, Swerea SICOMP, Swerea SWECAST and Swerea KIMAB (the corrosion area). RISE operates under the Ministry of Enterprise and Innovation (Sweden).

== History ==
During the beginning and mid 20th century Swedish industry prospered. A a result of the blooming years a number of research institutes were formed to ensure further development. The first was the Metallographic Institute (Metallografiska institutet), founded in 1921 by director and physicist Carl Benedicks. The institute was to go through many name changes and mergers. From The Metallographic institute to the Institute for Metals Research (Institutet för Metallforskning, IM) to Swerea KIMAB, when it merged with the Corrosion Institute in 2005/2006 and became a part of the Swerea group. The Institute for Engineering Technology (Institutet för verkstadsteknisk forskning, IVF) and The Swedish Foundry Association (Svenska Gjuteriföreningen) were also formed during those good years. The Swedish Foundry Association eventually split into a research institute, Swerea SWECAST, and a trade association that kept the original name. When industry development and economy experienced a dip in the late 20th century, SICOMP was founded, in 1988, in order to strengthen competition through contributing with more advanced knowledge and research on composite material. SICOMP became Swerea SICOMP, a part of the Swerea group, when Swerea was founded in 2005. On October 1, 2018, two thirds of the Swerea group became RISE Research Institutes of Sweden. The remaining part formed a new institute, Swerim.

== Research collaborations ==
Swerea research focused on materials development, production development and product development. The research group took part in international research efforts such as CleanSky, STEPWISE, Fire-resist, Biobased Industries etcetera.

== Subsidiaries ==
Subsidiaries	Founded	Incorporated	Offices
Swerea IVF	1964	2005	Mölndal, Stockholm, Linköping, Eskilstuna, Trollhättan, Olofström, Oslo
Swerea KIMAB	1921	2005	Kista, Brest, St. Etienne
Swerea MEFOS	1963	2012	Luleå
Swerea SICOMP	1988	2005	Piteå, Linköping, Mölndal
Swerea SWECAST	1967	2006	Jönköping
