= Abir Al-Sahlani =

Swedish politician (born 1976)

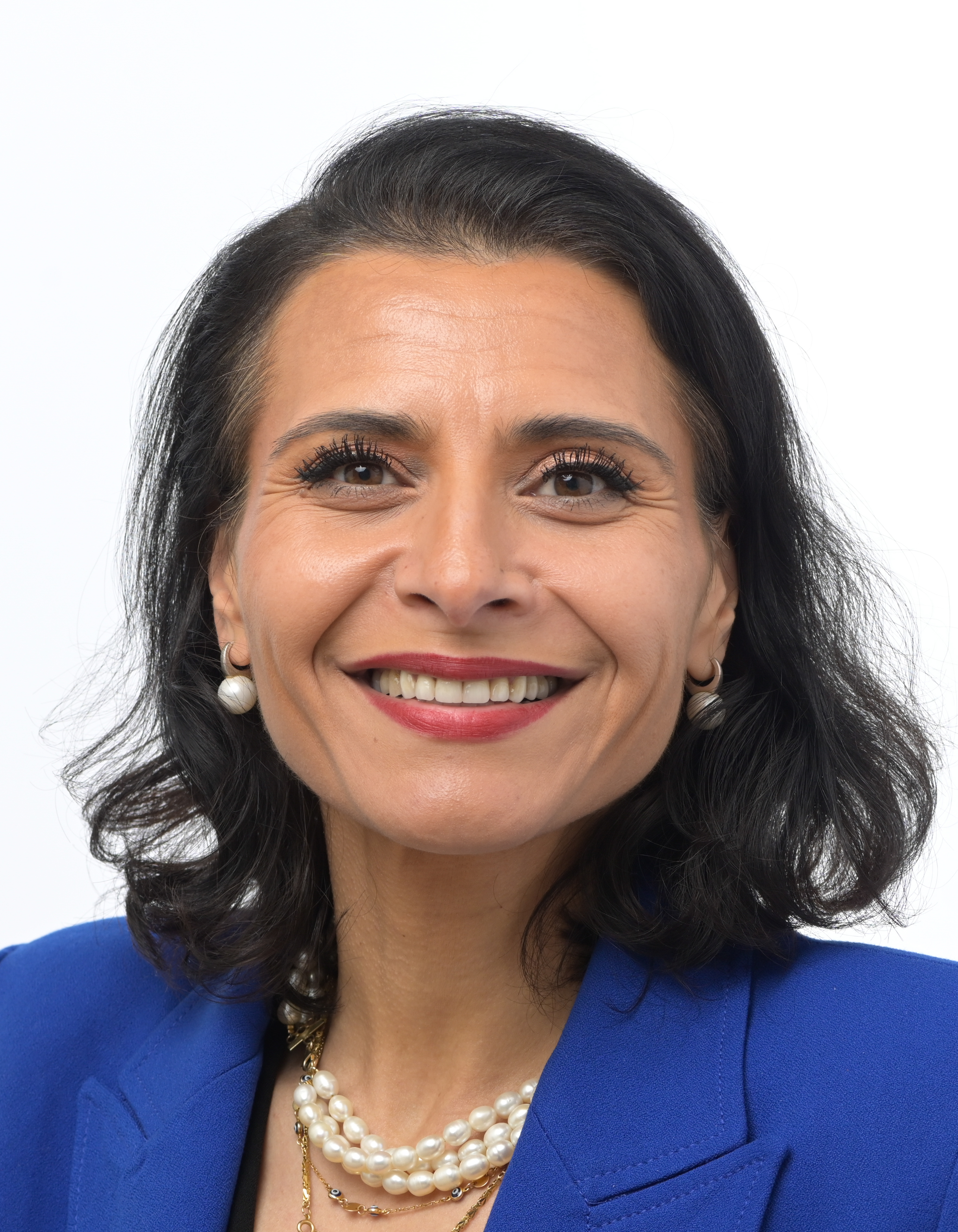
- Official portrait, 2024

Member of the European Parliament
- Incumbent
- Assumed office 1 July 2019

Member of the Riksdag
- In office 4 October 2010 – 29 September 2014

Personal details
- Born: 18 May 1976 (age 50) Basra, Ba'athist Iraq
- Citizenship: Sweden
- Party: Centre (since 2004)
- Children: 3
- Education: Mid Sweden University; Stockholm University
- Occupation: Information engineer • Politician

Abir Al-Sahlani (born 18 May 1976) is an Iraqi-born Swedish Member of the European Parliament and since July 2019 a member of the European Parliament, representing the Centre Party. She lives in Hägersten, Stockholm.

== Biography ==
Al Sahlani was born in Basra, Iraq in 1976 to a middle class Iraqi family. Her father, Faisal Sahlani, was a leading opposition politician. He was a member of the Communist Party, which at that time, was banned by Saddam Hussein's Ba'athist regime. She left Iraq with her mother, fleeing the brutality of the former regime, leaving behind her father, a political prisoner in Abu Ghraib prison. Al Sahlani arrived in Sweden alone at the age of 15 and began her political career soon afterwards.

== Education ==
Al-Sahlani studied at the Mid Sweden University (Mittuniversitetet) in Sundsvall. She holds a master's degree from Stockholm University.

In 2002–2003 she was a volunteer with Nacka School (Internationella Engelska Skolan) in Stockholm.

== Political career ==
In 2004 Al-Sahlani was appointed to the Secretary General of the Iraqi National Democratic Alliance (DNA) position.

In February 2007 Al-Sahlani became a member of Sweden's Center Party. In May 2019, Al-Sahlani was elected to the European Parliament. She has since been serving on the Committee on Employment and Social Affairs. In addition to her committee assignments, she is a member of the European Parliament Intergroup on Disability, the European Parliament Intergroup on LGBT Rights and the European Parliament Intergroup on Seas, Rivers, Islands and Coastal Areas.

Since 2021 Al-Sahlani has been part of the Parliament's delegation to the Conference on the Future of Europe.

In 2024, Al-Sahlani was the winner of the "Best Speech" award at The Parliament Magazine's annual MEP Awards.

== Time-out ==
In November 2013 Al-Sahlani took time-out from the Swedish parliament due to alleged deficiencies in the reporting of an aid project in Iraq. According to the Swedish Radio, 300,000 euros had not been reported correctly. Half a year later she was cleared of all charges and made a comeback in the Swedish Parliament.

== Mahsa Amini protests ==
In October 2022, Al-Sahlani cut her hair in the middle of a speech at European Parliament in Strasbourg, France, whilst intoning the popular Kurdish YPJ women's resistance slogan, "Jin, Jiyan, Azadi," which translates to 'woman, life, freedom' to affirm her support for Iranian women and the Mahsa Amini protests and to call on Europe to act.

== See also ==
- Swedish Iraqis
- List of Iraqis
