= Angelika Sjöstedt =

Swedish gender studies academic

- Born: 1979 (age 46–47)
- Other name: Angelika Sjöstedt Landén
- Title: Chair of Gender Studies at Mid Sweden University

Academic background
- Education: Umeå University (PhD, 2014)

Angelika Sjöstedt (born 1979), formerly Angelika Sjöstedt Landén, is a Swedish gender studies professor and Chair of Gender Studies at Mid Sweden University (Mittuniversitetet). Her academic work focuses on gender, intersectionality, queer and feminist theory, decolonial studies, and the critique of settler colonialism and neoliberalism, particularly in relation to rural contexts and crisis discourse.

== Career and education ==
Sjöstedt earned her PhD in Ethnology from Umeå University in 2012. From 2014 to 2016, she worked as a researcher at Umeå University's Department of Arts and Humanities. In 2014, she was appointed Assistant Professor of Gender Studies at Mid Sweden University, where she became an Associate Professor (Docent) in 2019. She currently holds a full professorship and serves as the chair (ämnesföreträdare) of Gender Studies. She is the first professor of Gender Studies based at the Östersund campus.

== Selected bibliography ==
- Sjöstedt Landén, A. (ed.), Giritli Nygren, K. (ed.) & Fotaki, M. (ed.) (2021). Working life and gender inequality: Intersectional perspectives and the spatial practices of peripheralization. Routledge
- Hobbins, J. (ed.), Danielsson, E. (ed.) & Sjöstedt Landén, A. (ed.) (2020). Genus, risk och kris. Lund: Studentlitteratur
- Fahlgren, S. (ed.), Mulinari, D. (ed.) & Sjöstedt Landén, A. (ed.) (2016). Ambivalenser och maktordningar: Feministiska läsningar av nyliberalism. Stockholm: Makadam Förlag
