= Mid Sweden University =

Swedish university

- Mittuniversitetet
- Type: State university
- Established: 1 July 1993; 33 years ago
- Affiliations: UArctic
- Vice-Chancellor: Anders Fällström
- Location: Sundsvall and Östersund, Sweden
- Colours: Yellow and blue
- Nickname: MIUN
- Website: www.miun.se/en

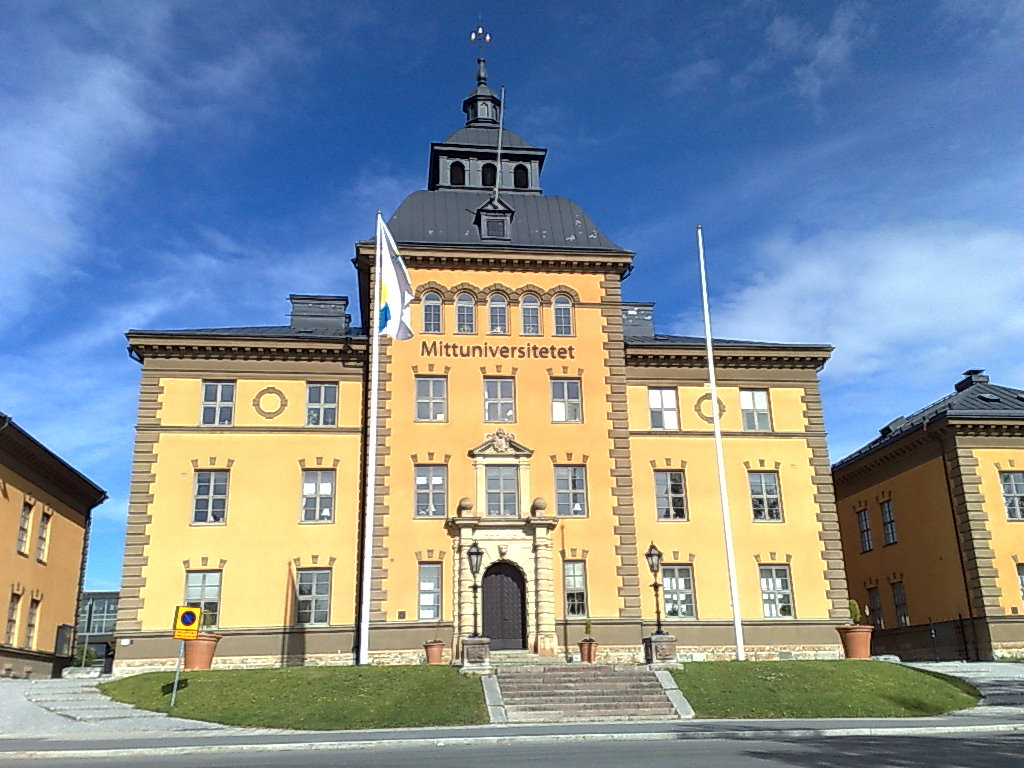
Campus in the city of Östersund

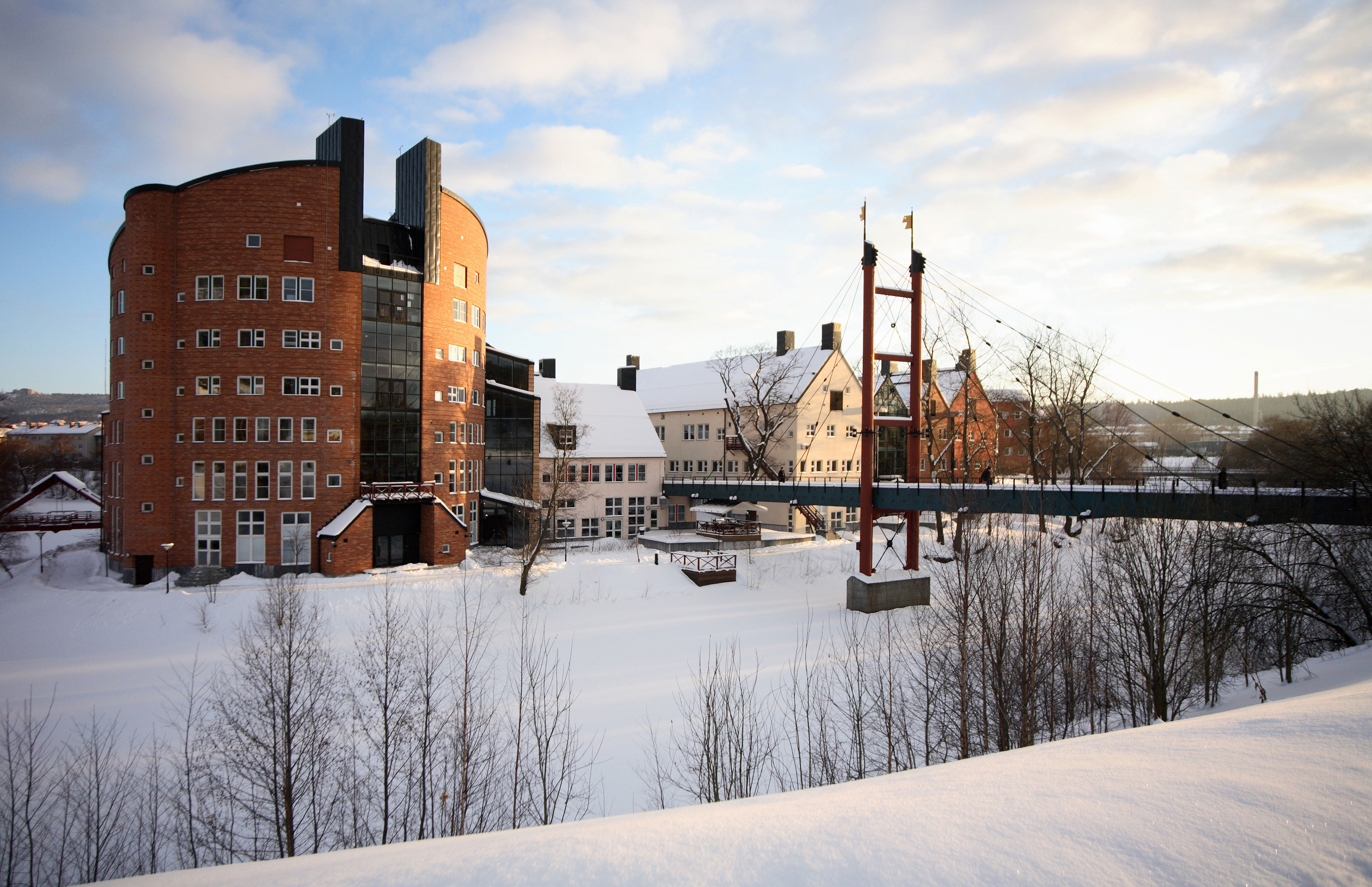
Campus in the city of Sundsvall

Mid Sweden University (Swedish: Mittuniversitetet) is a Swedish state university located in the region around the geographical center of Sweden. It has two campuses: one in Östersund and one in Sundsvall. The university was founded in 1993 as the result of a merger. A third campus in Härnösand was active from founding to the summer of 2016, but has since closed.

== History ==
Created on 1 July 1993, the institution was originally called Mid Sweden University College (Mitthögskolan) and was the result of a merger between the University College of Sundsvall/Härnösand (Högskolan i Sundsvall/Härnösand) and the University College of Östersund (Högskolan i Östersund). The two university colleges had been founded in 1977, with roots in the School of social work that started in 1971 in the city of Östersund, and in the Folk high school teachers' seminary and the nautical training/naval school that were launched in 1842 in the city of Härnösand. On 1 July 1995, the Sundsvall/Örnsköldsvik and Östersund Colleges of Health Sciences (Vårdhögskolor) were also incorporated.

In 2001 Mid Sweden University was awarded university status in the natural sciences area of research including IT, and was thus entitled to issue doctoral degrees. Employees that were carrying out doctoral studies before then were enrolled at other universities, where they had their main supervisor, but were also locally supervised at Mid Sweden University College. Effective 1 January 2005, the government of Sweden granted the institution the right to call itself a university and the school's name changed to Mid Sweden University (Mittuniversitetet).

== Organization ==
Mid Sweden University has two authorised areas of research (vetenskapsområden), organized under the Faculty of Science, Technology and Media (since 2001), and the Faculty of Human Sciences (since 2005), respectively. Education and research is also organized under the Faculty of Educational Sciences (lärarutbildningsnämnden).

The university was organized into eight departments, of which four are multi-campus departments:

- Faculty of Human Sciences:
  - Department of Humanities
  - Department of Social Sciences
  - Department of Social Work
  - Department of Health Sciences
  - Department of Economics, Geography, Law and Tourism
- Faculty of Science, Technology and Media:
  - Department of Information Technology and Media
  - Department of Natural Sciences
  - Department of Engineering, Physics and Mathematics
- Faculty of Educational Sciences:
  - Department of Education

== Education ==
The university has offered bachelor's degree (kandidatexamen) and Swedish master's degree (magisterexamen, one year) in a wide range of subjects since 1994, doctoral degree (doktorsexamen and licentiatexamen) since 2001, and International master's degree (masterexamen, two years) according to the Bologna model since 2005. Mid Sweden University also offers professional degrees within Master of Science and Engineering (civilingenjörsexamen, similar to German Diploma engineer) since 2003, and as engineer, teacher, nurse, specialist nurse, social worker/welfare officer (socionom), journalist and, from 2008, Psychologist.

The university's two main campuses have different focuses but with some overlap. The Sundsvall campus has a school of education and offers various courses in the humanities and arts. It also has a wide range of courses and degrees in the technical and natural sciences and journalism. The Östersund campus focuses on graduate degrees in tourism, health care, social work and public administration. Campus Östersund also has Sweden's only ecotechnology programme. Besides the above, education and research within digital printing technology is located in the city of Örnsköldsvik.

The institution is also well known for a wide range of web-based distance education.

== International collaboration ==
Mittuniversitetet is an active member of the University of the Arctic. UArctic is an international cooperative network based in the Circumpolar Arctic region, consisting of more than 200 universities, colleges, and other organizations with an interest in promoting education and research in the Arctic region.

The university also participates in UArctic's mobility program north2north. The aim of that program is to enable students of member institutions to study in different parts of the North.

== Number of students and employees ==
In school year 2009/2010, the university had 21,476 undergraduate students (including master students) with 4,000 of them based in Östersund, 4,000 in Sundsvall, 2,000 in Härnösand and the rest in distance-learning programs. The university has 235 doctoral students, about 800 teachers, of which 80 were employed professors, and in all more than 1,000 employees.

=== Past rectors (Sundsvall) ===
- 1993–1994 Alf Gunnmo
- 1994–1999 Kari Marklund
- 1999 (acting) Alf Gunnmo
- 1999–2003 Gunnar Svedberg
- 2003 (acting) Pia Sandvik Wiklund
- 2003–2008 Thomas Lindstein
- 2008 (acting) Håkan Wiklund
- 2008-2016 Anders Söderholm

=== Past prorectors (Östersund) ===
- 1993–1999 Alf Gunnmo
- 1999 (acting) Sture Pettersson
- 1999–2002 Mats Ericson
- 2002–2005 Pia Sandvik Wiklund
- 2003 (acting) Sture Pettersson
- 2005–2006 (acting) Sture Pettersson
- 2006— Håkan Wiklund
- 2008 (acting) Sture Pettersson

== Honorary doctorates at Mid Sweden University ==
- 2001 – Thorbjörn Fälldin
- 2002 – Kenway Smith
- 2004 – Sverker Martin-Löf
- 2006 – Bodil Malmsten and Bengt Saltin
- 2008 – Magdalena Forsberg and Lars Näsman
- 2010 – Kenneth Eriksson, Erik Fichtelius, Björn Fjæstad and Jan Stenberg

== Notable professors ==
- Angelika Sjöstedt
- Peter Schantz

== Famous alumni ==
Here is a list of people who have received attention from national media, and have studied either at Mid Sweden University, or one of the colleges that later formed Mid Sweden University.

- Jerry Ahrlin, cross-country skier
- Abir Al-Sahlani, Member of Parliament
- Berit Andnor, former Minister for Social Affairs and member of parliament
- Helena Jonsson, biathlete
- Mari Jungstedt, journalist and author
- Jan Helin, journalist and the editor-in-chief of Aftonbladet since 2008
- Anna-Karin Kammerling, swimmer
- Mikaela Laurén, swimmer and boxer
- Melodie MC (Kent Lövgren), Eurodance rapper
- Ylva Nowén, Alpine skier and expert commentator
- Linda Olofsson, TV journalist
- Anna Ottosson, Alpine skier
- Roger Haddad, Member of Parliament
- Fadime Sahindal, Kurdish immigrant
- Anders Sodergren, cross-country skier
- Åsa Torstensson, Member of Parliament and former Minister for Transport 2006–2010
- Fredrik Wikingsson, journalist and TV host
- Gina Dirawi, comedian and TV host

== See also ==
- List of colleges and universities in Sweden
- Student Union in Sundsvall
