= Tobii =

Swedish high-tech company that makes hardware and software for eye-tracking

Tobii AB
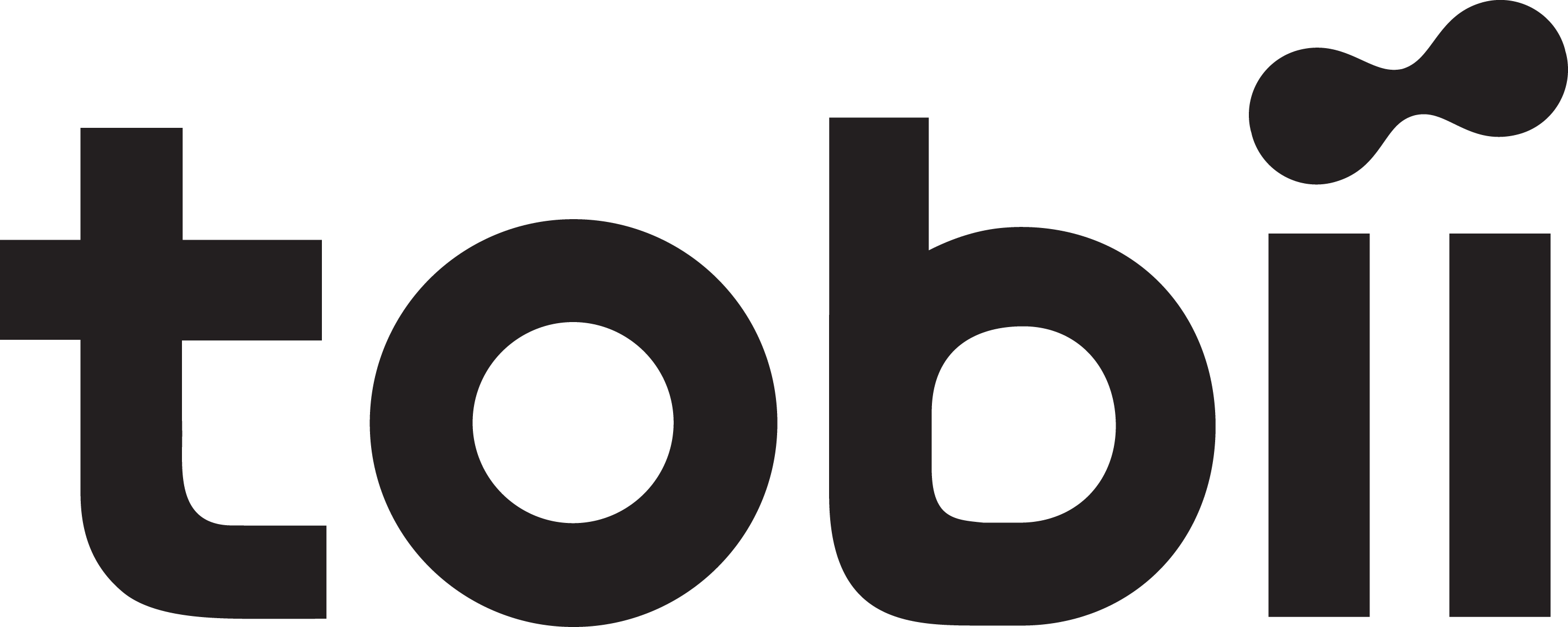
- Type: Public
- Traded as: Nasdaq Stockholm: TOBII
- Industry: Hardware and software development
- Founded: Sweden (2001)
- Founders: John Elvesjö, Mårten Skogö, Henrik Eskilsson
- Headquarters: Stockholm
- Area served: Worldwide
- Key people: Per Norman (Chairman); Fadi Pharaon (CEO)
- Products: Eye tracking products for research and market analysis. Eye tracking components for industrial integration.
- Revenue: 1426 million SEK (2020) (US$160 million)
- Number of employees: 600
- Parent: Tobii AB
- Website: www.tobii.com

Tobii AB (formerly known as Tobii Technology AB) is a Swedish technology company that develops and sells products for eye tracking and attention computing.

== History ==
Founded in 2001, Tobii is a developer of eye tracking solutions for use in scientific research, extended reality headsets, commercial devices, and custom-built machines. Tobii is based in Stockholm, Sweden, with offices in the US, Japan, China, Romania, Switzerland, United Kingdom, Ireland, Taiwan, and South Korea. Tobii became publicly traded on April 22, 2015, on the Nasdaq Stockholm. The company was founded by John Elvesjo, Mårten Skogö, and Henrik Eskilsson who handed over the CEO role to Anand Srivatsa toward the end of 2021. In April 2022, Tobii officially merged the Tobii Group, and two of its former three business units Tobii Pro and Tobii Tech into a single entity Tobii AB. The third business unit, Tobii Dynavox, a previous acquisition of US based DynaVox, was spun off in October 2021. In January 2026, Fadi Pharaon succeeded Anand Srivatsa as CEO of Tobii.

== Technology ==
Tobii develops eye tracking hardware and software used in scientific research, automotive interior sensing, healthcare, assistive technology, gaming, and extended reality (XR). Tobii's screen-based and wearable eye trackers are video-based systems. Commercial eye trackers commonly use cameras, infrared illumination, pupil-position tracking, corneal reflections, algorithms, and calibration methods to measure eye position and estimate gaze. Eye tracking data are used to study gaze behavior, visual attention, and eye movements in research and applied settings.

Tobii's eye tracking products include screen-based systems, such as the Tobii Pro Spectrum and Tobii Pro Fusion, and wearable eye tracking glasses, such as Tobii Pro Glasses 3. Tobii also provides software development kits for use with supported Tobii Pro eye trackers. Independent device evaluations commonly describe eye tracker data quality in terms of accuracy, precision, and data loss.

== Research use ==
=== Vision science and behavioral research ===
Tobii eye trackers have been evaluated in peer-reviewed vision science and behavioral research. In a comparison of the Tobii Pro TX300 and its successor, the Tobii Pro Spectrum, De Kloe and colleagues described the TX300 as a popular eye tracker in developmental eye tracking research and reported that the Spectrum produced higher data quality, particularly for younger infants. A comparison of six wearable eye trackers, including Tobii Pro Glasses 2 and 3, found that all tested devices could record gaze during dynamic activities such as walking and jumping, while accuracy and data loss differed across devices and movement conditions.

=== Human-computer interaction and user experience research ===
Eye tracking is used in human-computer interaction and usability research, and Tobii devices are commonly used instruments in this literature. A 2023 systematic review of eye tracking in usability and user experience found that Tobii products were used in most of the studies it examined, attributing their prevalence to ease of setup, accuracy, and noninvasive operation. A systematic review of eye tracking methods in mobile and edge-computing contexts similarly listed Tobii screen-based trackers and eye tracking glasses among commonly used commercial devices.

=== Healthcare and medical research ===
Eye tracking has been studied as a noninvasive method in neurological, cognitive, and optometric research. A 2025 systematic review of eye tracking in Alzheimer's disease, mild cognitive impairment and related dementias found that antisaccade tasks consistently distinguished affected groups from healthy controls, while cautioning that most studies lacked biomarker-based diagnostic criteria; the reviewed studies used several eye tracking systems, including Tobii TX300 and Tobii Pro devices. A 2021 systematic review and meta-analysis found that eye tracking methods showed potential for evaluating cognitive disorders, while noting that protocols varied and further high-quality studies were needed. In optometry, a 2023 systematic review listed Tobii among the eye-tracker manufacturers most commonly used in the reviewed studies.

== Industry recognition ==
During the late 2000s and early 2010s, Tobii received industry recognition for its eye tracking technologies and product design. In 2011, Tobii Glasses received a Red Dot Design Award for product design. In 2012, Tobii's eye tracking technology received recognition at CES, including a Best Prototype award from technology publication Notebooks.com.
