= Institute for Surface Chemistry =

Swedish research institute

YKI, Institute for Surface Chemistry (YKI, Ytkemiska Institutet AB)
- Type: Industrial research institute
- Industry: Research, Consultant
- Headquarters: Stockholm, Sweden
- Key people: Peter Alberius, President
- Number of employees: About 65 (SP Group 780)
- Parent: Research Institutes of Sweden
- Website: www.yki.se

The Institute for Surface Chemistry, YKI (Swedish: Ytkemiska Institutet) is an industrial research institute in applied surface and colloid chemistry located in Stockholm, Sweden. It is located on the campus of the Royal Institute of Technology (KTH). YKI's mission is to transfer and develop innovations to customers in industrial sectors where surface chemistry plays an important role. The areas of expertise lie in the fields of surface and colloid science. It has a staff of approximately 65 persons.

YKI is a part of the SP Group, SP Technical Research Institute of Sweden. The work within YKI is organized in three sections, Materials and Coatings Section, Forest Products Section and Life Science and Chemical Industries Section.

== History ==
1968/69 saw the creation of The Foundation for Surface Chemistry Research (sw. Stiftelsen Ytkemisk Forskning) as the Laboratory for Surface Chemistry was transformed into the Institute for Surface Chemistry. The industrial group was small and limited to Sweden, but the form was in many ways similar to what has proven to be highly functional and operates to this day. During the 1970s and 1980s the industrial group behind YKI expands outside Sweden to include also Denmark, Finland and Norway. During the 1990s the first companies from European companies outside the Nordic region join. The second half of the decade sees the first US-based companies joining. In 1995 the foundation is changed to an association due to changes in Swedish legislation. FYF, Föreningen Ytkemisk Forskning / The Association for Surface Chemistry Research is formed. At the end of 2000 YKI was turned into a limited company with FYF as an owner to 60% and the Swedish Government via a holding company to 40%. When YKI joined the SP Group at the end of 2005 FYF sold its shares to SP. The revenue from this has been invested in novel instrumentation at YKI.

== The Association for Surface Chemistry Research ==
The Association for Surface Chemistry Research, FYF is YKI's non-profit industrial association. Its prime objectives are to promote technical and scientific research and to disseminate information within the field of applied surface chemistry in industry. The member companies in FYF are YKI’s most important clients and industrial partners. The Association is open, i.e. membership can be granted to any company or organization interested in surface chemistry research.

== Research ==
The research at YKI is categorized in the following ten areas.

- Technology and application focus areas
  - Formulation Technologies
  - Interfacial and Surface Modification Technologies
  - Nanotechnology and Structured Materials
  - Controlled Delivery and Release Technologies
  - Cleantech - Energy and Environmental Technologies
- Knowledge focus areas
  - Multicomponent Systems
  - Dispersed Systems
  - Interfaces in Contact and Motion
  - Synthesis and Characterization of Structured Materials
  - Biointerfaces and Biosurface Chemistry
