= Innventia =

Company in Stockholm, Sweden

Coordinates: 59.35096°N 18.06663°E

RISE Innventia AB is a subsidiary to RISE Research Institutes of Sweden. The business focuses on research, development and innovation in the pulp and paper industry, packaging industry and the biorefining industry. The activities range from basic research to direct consulting and development assignments in the value chains with the final products bio-based energy, chemicals and materials, and packaging. Before April 2009 the institute was named STFI-Packforsk AB.

Since the 1 April 2016, Innventia is owned by the Swedish government through RISE Research Institutes of Sweden.
