= Pam Fredman =

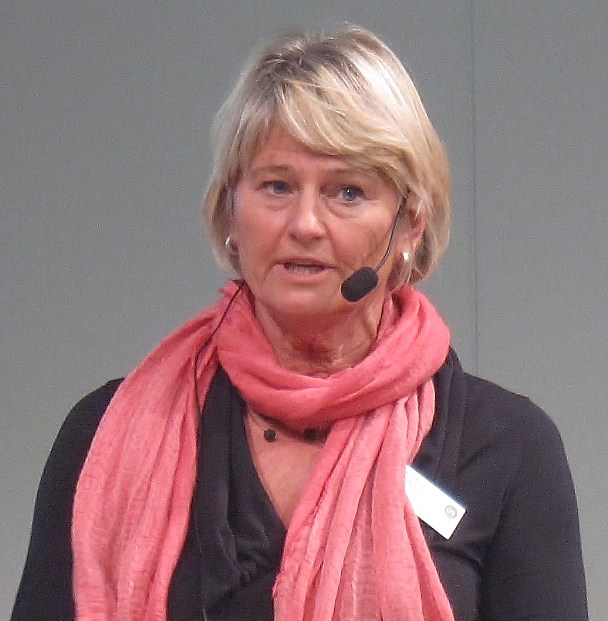
- Born: May 13, 1950; Gothenburg, Sweden
- Education: Chalmers University of Technology
- Scientific career
- Fields: neuroscience
- Workplaces: University of Gothenburg; International Association of Universities

Pam Fredman (born 13 May 1950, in Gothenburg, Sweden) is a Swedish professor of neuroscience and former rector of the University of Gothenburg. From 2016, Fredman is the President of the International Association of Universities

== Biography ==
Fredman graduated with a Master of Science in Chemical Engineering at Chalmers University of Technology in 1973 and a Doctor of Philosophy in Neurochemistry in 1979. Her thesis is titled ”Structure and Function of Gangliosides”.

Between 1995 and 1997 she was head of the Department of Clinical Neurosciences.

She was appointed in 1997 as a professor of neurology at the University of Gothenburg, and became vice-Dean of the Faculty of Medicine between 1997 and 1998. She continued to have several executive positions within the Sahlgrenska Academy.

Between 2003 and 2006 Fredman was the director and dean of the Sahlgrenska Academy. On July 1, 2006, she was rector of the University of Gothenburg, a position she held until July 1, 2017.

Fredman has been a member of the Royal Swedish Academy of Engineering Sciences since 2008.

Vice-Chancellor of the University of Gothenburg from 2006 to 2017. As vice-Chancellor, Fredman was the head of the University and its principal representative.

Fredman has also been a board member for several organizations, including the Swedish Medical Research Council (from 1999 to 2003), the International Society of Neurochemistry (1995-1999) and Federation of European Neuroscience (1996-2001)

From 2016, Fredman is the President of the International Association of Universities.

Fredman sat on the board of the Swedish University and Higher Education Association, SUHF, between 2007 and 2014, and was its chairman 2009–2014.

Freedman has over 100 publications and 4700 citations.

== Honors and awards ==
Freedman has won the following awards:

- ESN Young Honorary Lecturer, 1982
- The Fernström prize for promising young researchers, 1994
