= Research Institutes of Sweden =

Swedish public research institute

RISE Research Institutes of Sweden
- Company type: Research Institute
- Founded: 1997; Merged with RISE Research Institutes of Sweden Holding AB in 2018
- Headquarters: Gothenburg, Sweden
- Key people: Malin Frenning (CEO); Jan Wäreby (chairman)
- Owner: Government of Sweden
- Number of employees: 3,298 (December 2023)
- Website: www.ri.se/en

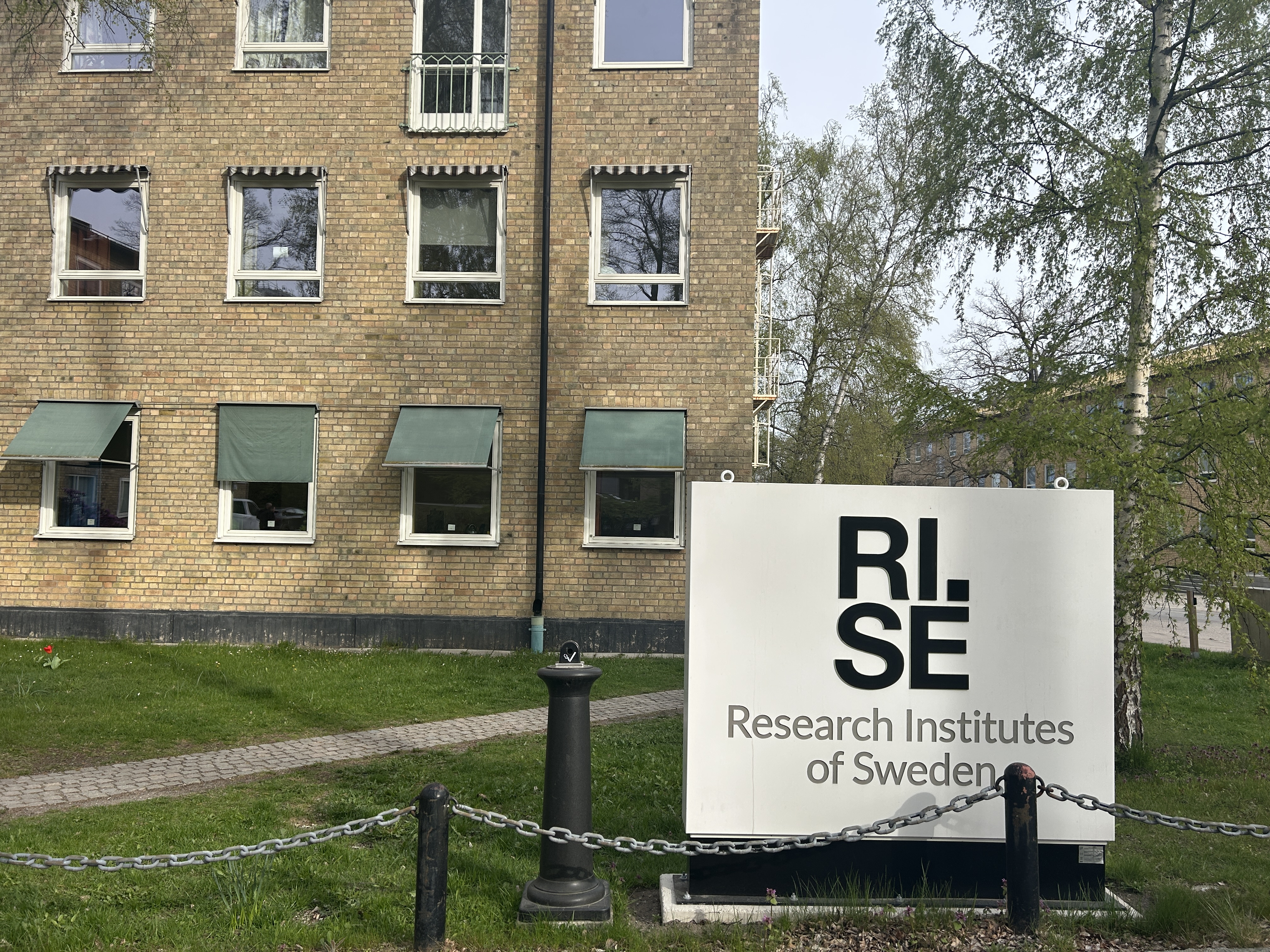
RISE office entrance in Stockholm, April 2025

RISE Research Institutes of Sweden AB (RISE) is a Swedish state-owned research institute that collaborates with universities, industry and the public sector.

RISE performs industry research and innovation, as well as testing and certification. According to the research proposition of the Swedish government, the overall objective for RISE is to be internationally competitive and work for sustainable growth in Sweden by strengthening industry competitiveness and renewal.

Rise is also associated with Enterprise Europe Network.

RISE operates in more than 25 cities all over Sweden and also has facilities in Denmark, Norway, Great Britain, France and Belgium. In 2019, RISE had a turnover of 3,57 billion SEK.

In January 2021, RISE had approximately 2,800 employees over six organisational divisions:

- Bioeconomy and Health
- Built Environment
- Digital systems
- Materials and Production
- Life Science
- Safety and Transport

== Ownership and history ==
RISE AB was founded in 1997 as Ireco Holding AB by the Ministry of Enterprise and Innovation (Sweden) (formerly the Ministry of Enterprise, Energy and Communications), and the government agency The Knowledge Foundation. Until 2002, RISE reviewed the structure with owners and other interested parties and turned trusts into registered corporations.

In 2007, the IRECO Holding AB became wholly state-owned in 2007, and its operations were organised into different corporate groups:

- Innventia
- SP Technical Research Institute of Sweden
- Swedish ICT
- Swerea

In 2009, the company name was changed to RISE Research Institutes of Sweden Holding AB and received an expanded mandate and significantly increased resources. Since 2016, RISE Research Institutes of Sweden is the sole owner of Sweden Holding AB Innventia, the Swedish ICT companies, and most companies within the SP group. Since 2017, they all operate under the RISE brand name.

In 2018, RISE Research Institutes of Sweden Holding AB merged with the subsidiary RISE Research Institutes of Sweden AB and took the latter name: RISE Research Institutes of Sweden AB. In October 2018, two thirds of the Swerea group became fully owned by RISE.

== Sustainability ==
RISE produces sustainability reports for projects and services, which were produced for 74 projects in 2018. Since 2019, RISE has had a six-year sustainability strategy that is partly connected to the United Nations' Sustainable Development Goals, as well as their impact on sustainability through internal activities (e.g. travels), as well as through research projects and services.

- Electricity use per employee (kWh): ▼11 125, 2020 (14 823, 2019)
- Business trips CO_{2} emissions per employee (kg): ▼224, 2020 (763, 2019)
- Projects having a Sustainability Declaration: 83 per cent, 2020 (20 per cent, 2019)

== The RISE group ==
RISE consists of five divisions that gather the operations of former autonomous research institutes and their subsidiaries.

- Innventia (paper, pulp, packaging and biofuel)
- SP Technical Research Institute of Sweden
  - SP Process Development AB
  - RISE Energy Technology Center
  - RISE Fire Research AS
  - CBI, Swedish Cement and Concrete Research Institute
  - Glafo, Glass Research Institute
  - JTI, Swedish Institute of Agricultutral and Environmental Engineering
  - SIK, Swedish Institute for Food and Biotechnology
  - SMP, Swedish Machinery Testing Institute
  - YKI, Institute for Surface Chemistry (since January 2013 integrated part of SP's Chemistry, Materials and Surfaces unit)
- Swedish ICT (information and communications technology)
  - Acreo Swedish ICT
  - RISE Interactive Institute AB
  - SICS Swedish ICT
  - RISE Viktoria AB
- Swerea (materials technology)
  - Swerea IVF
  - Swerea KIMAB
  - Swerea SICOMP
  - Swerea SWECAST
- RISE Processum AB (60% ownership)
- MoRe Research (60% ownership)
