= University of Gothenburg =

Public university in Gothenburg, Sweden

Coordinates: 57°41′54″N 11°58′18″E

- Göteborgs universitet
- Latin: Universitas Gothoburgensis
- Motto: Tradita innovare innovata tradere
- Motto in English: Renew our heritage and pass it on renewed
- Type: Public
- Established: 1891; 135 years ago
- Affiliations: EMU; EUTOPIA
- Vice-Chancellor: Malin Broberg
- Students: 53,624 (2023), 28,462 (FTE)
- Doctoral students: 801
- Location: Gothenburg, Sweden
- Campus: urban
- Colours: blue, white
- Website: www.gu.se/en/

The University of Gothenburg (Swedish: Göteborgs universitet) is a public university in Gothenburg, Sweden. Founded in 1891, the university is the third-oldest of the current Swedish universities and, with 58,000 students and 6,700 staff members, it is one of the largest universities in the Nordic countries.

== History ==
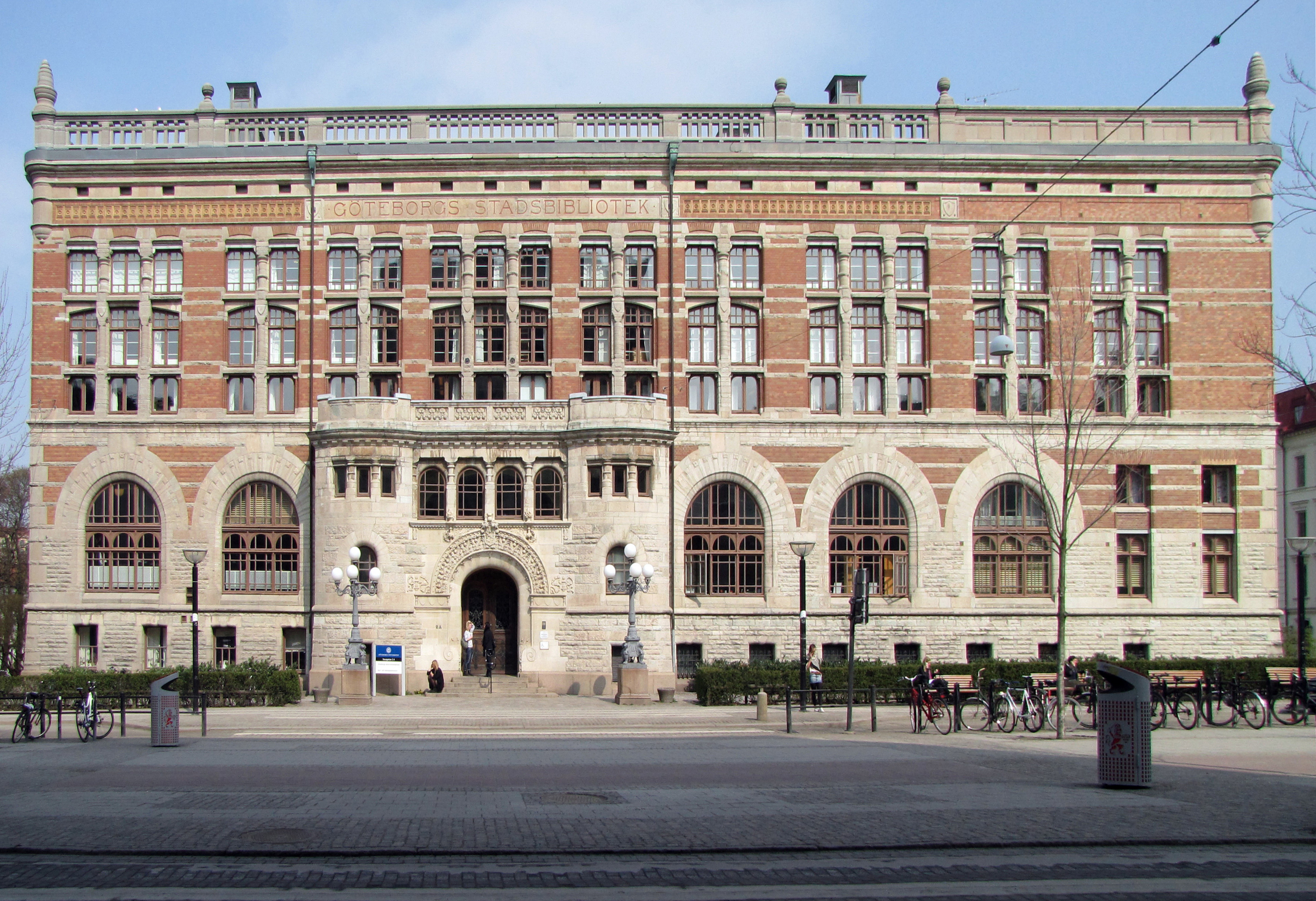
Library of social sciences, formerly main library

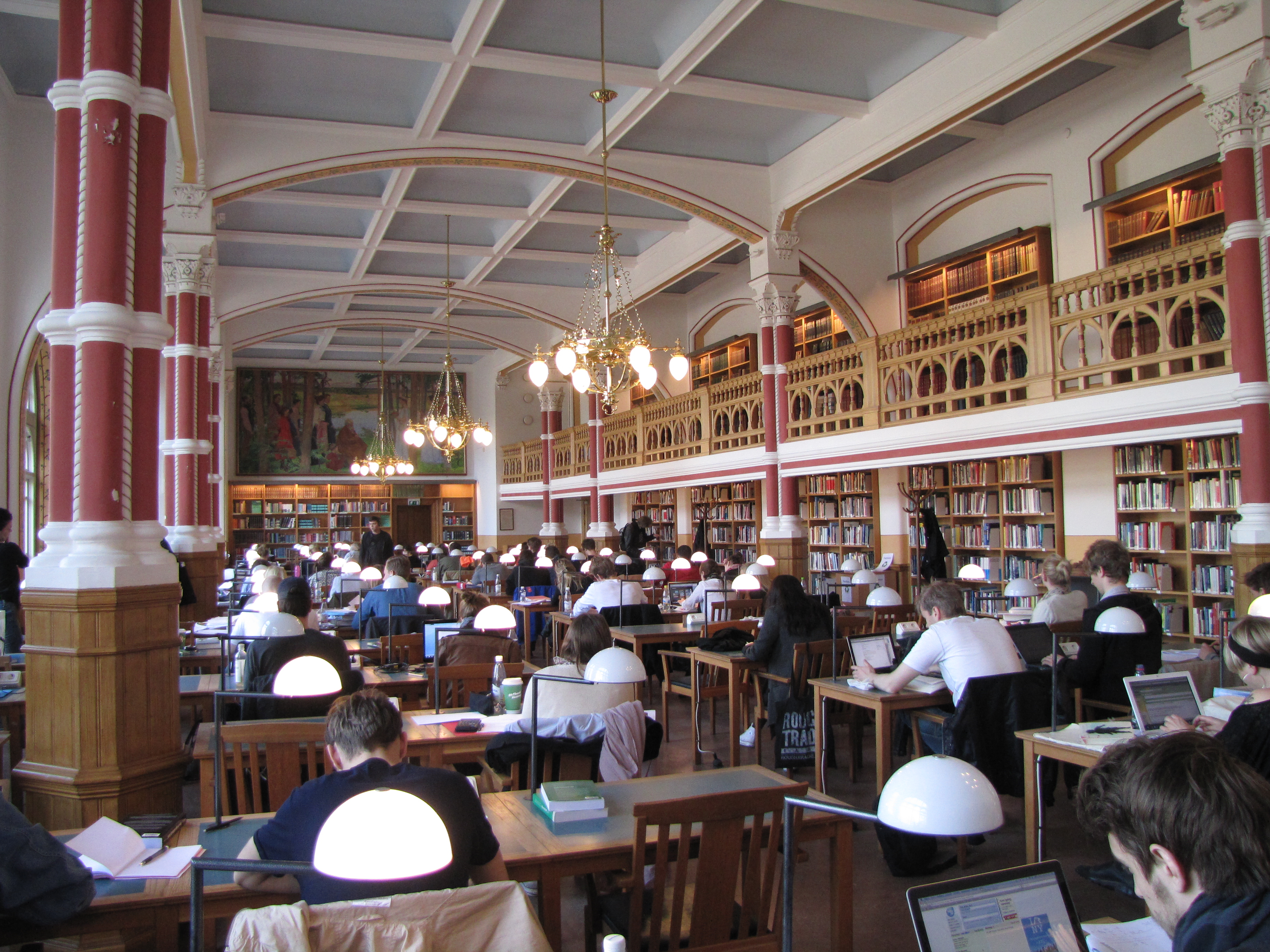
Library of social sciences, silent reading hall

The University of Gothenburg was founded as Göteborgs högskola (Gothenburg University College) in 1891. In 1907 it was granted the same status as Uppsala University and Lund University by the Swedish government, thus creating Sweden's third university.

Over the course of time, it has merged with a number of previously independent higher education institutions in the city and has continuously expanded its study profile. It was granted the rights of a full university by the Swedish Government in 1954, following the merger of the Göteborgs högskola (Gothenburg College) with the Medicinhögskolan i Göteborg (Gothenburg Medical School).

The University of Gothenburg is a pronounced city university, that is most of its facilities are within the city centre of Gothenburg. The main building as well as most faculties are located in the central part of Gothenburg.

Together with Uppsala, Lund, and Stockholm universities, it is one of four large international research universities in Sweden.

== Structure ==
=== Management ===
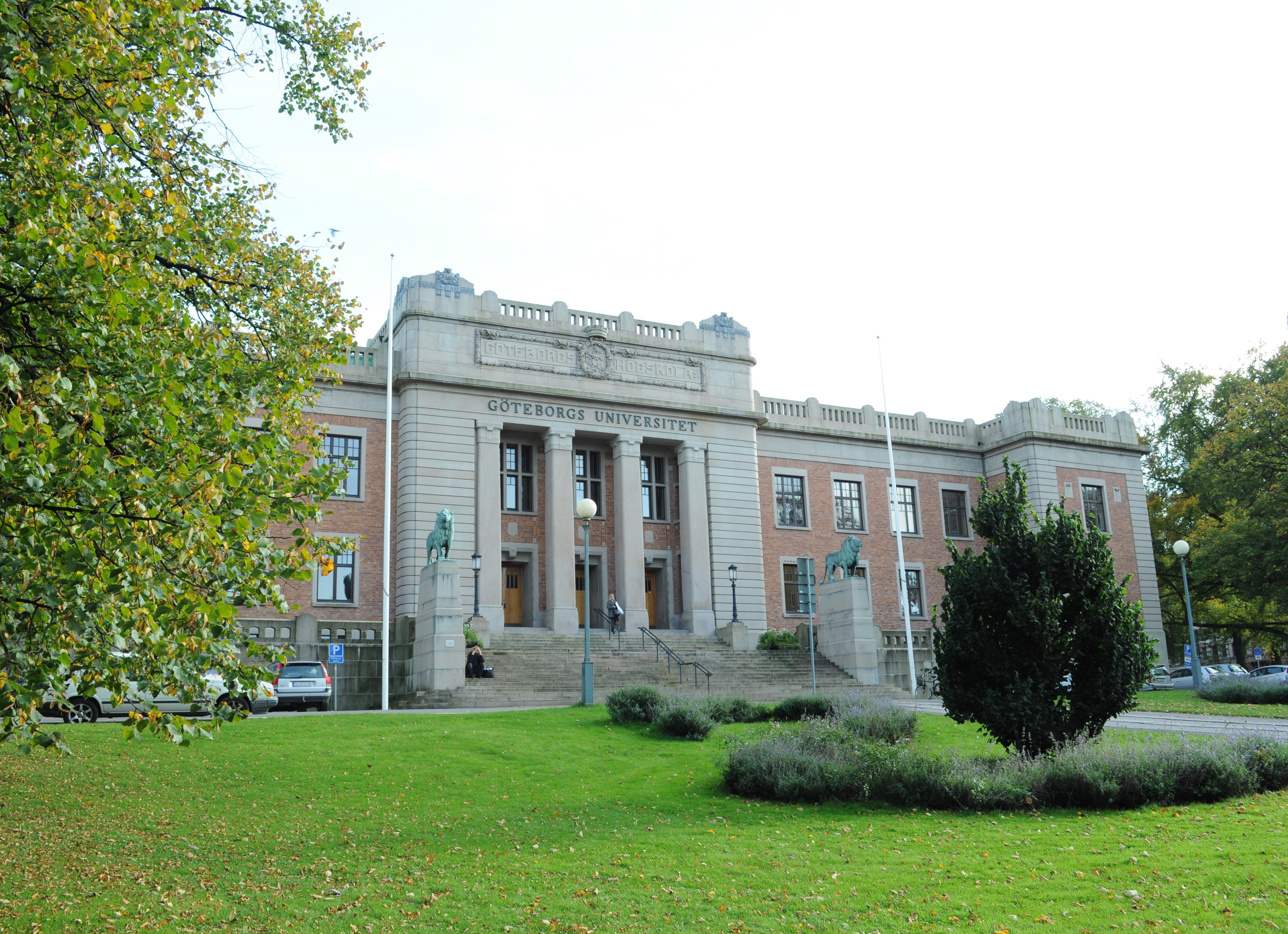
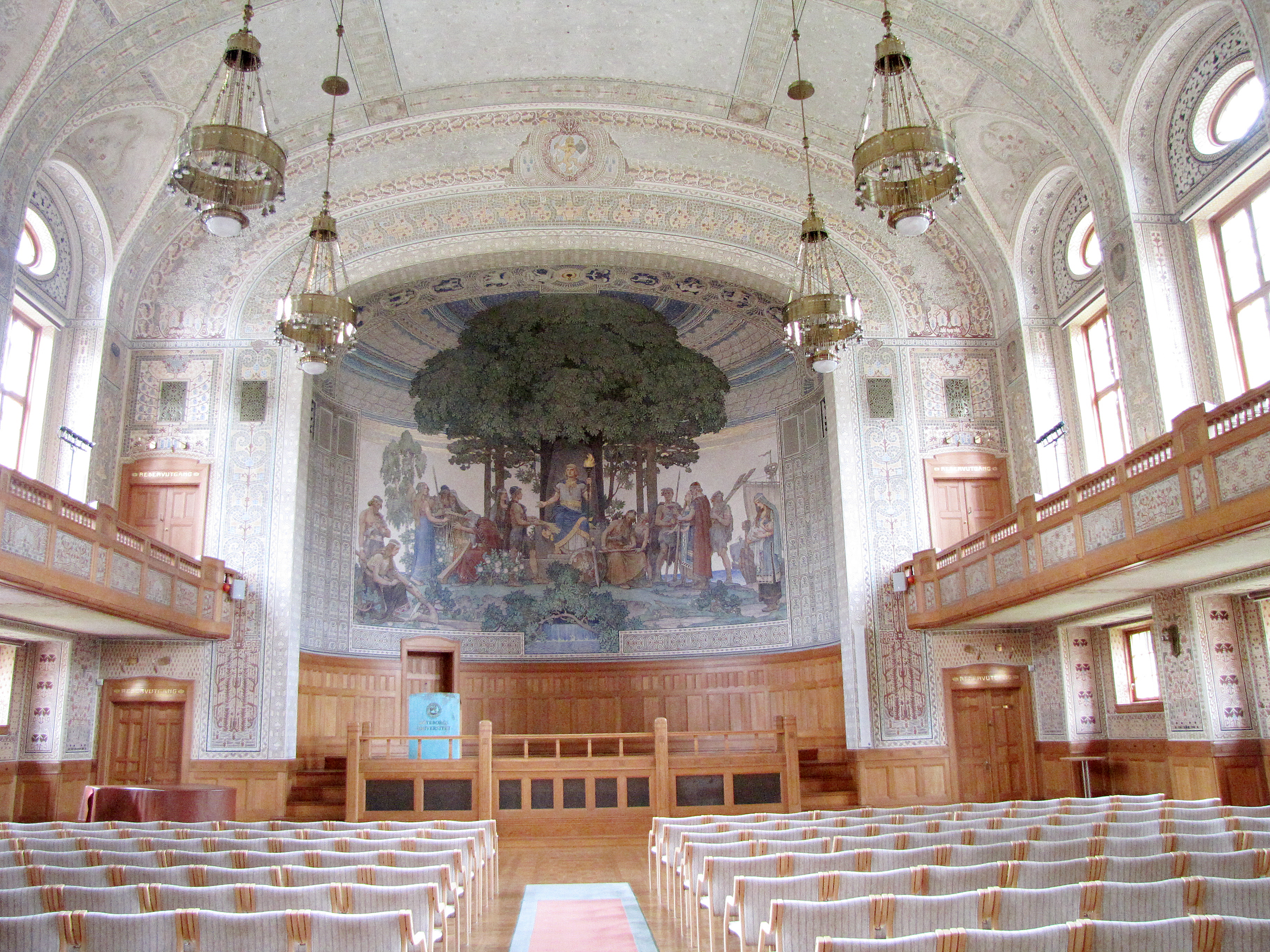
The entrance (left) to and the auditorium (right) of the main administrative building of the university

The University of Gothenburg is one of Sweden's largest universities. It is a comprehensive university, organised into eight faculties and 38 departments. The university is a public authority as well as a confederation of Faculty Boards. Each faculty/school has significant autonomy based on its attributed powers, and a distinct identity within the university.

The University Board is the university's highest decision-making body. The board consists has "supervision over all the University's affairs, and is responsible that its duties are fulfilled". The Swedish Government appoints seven of the members externally, based on their having experience in activities that have significance for the university's teaching and research functions. In addition, the vice-chancellor, three faculty members and three students, as well as union representatives are included as ordinary members.

The day-to-day management is headed by the vice-chancellor, Malin Broberg, who is responsible for implementing the decisions of the board. She is supported by the central administration.

=== Faculties ===
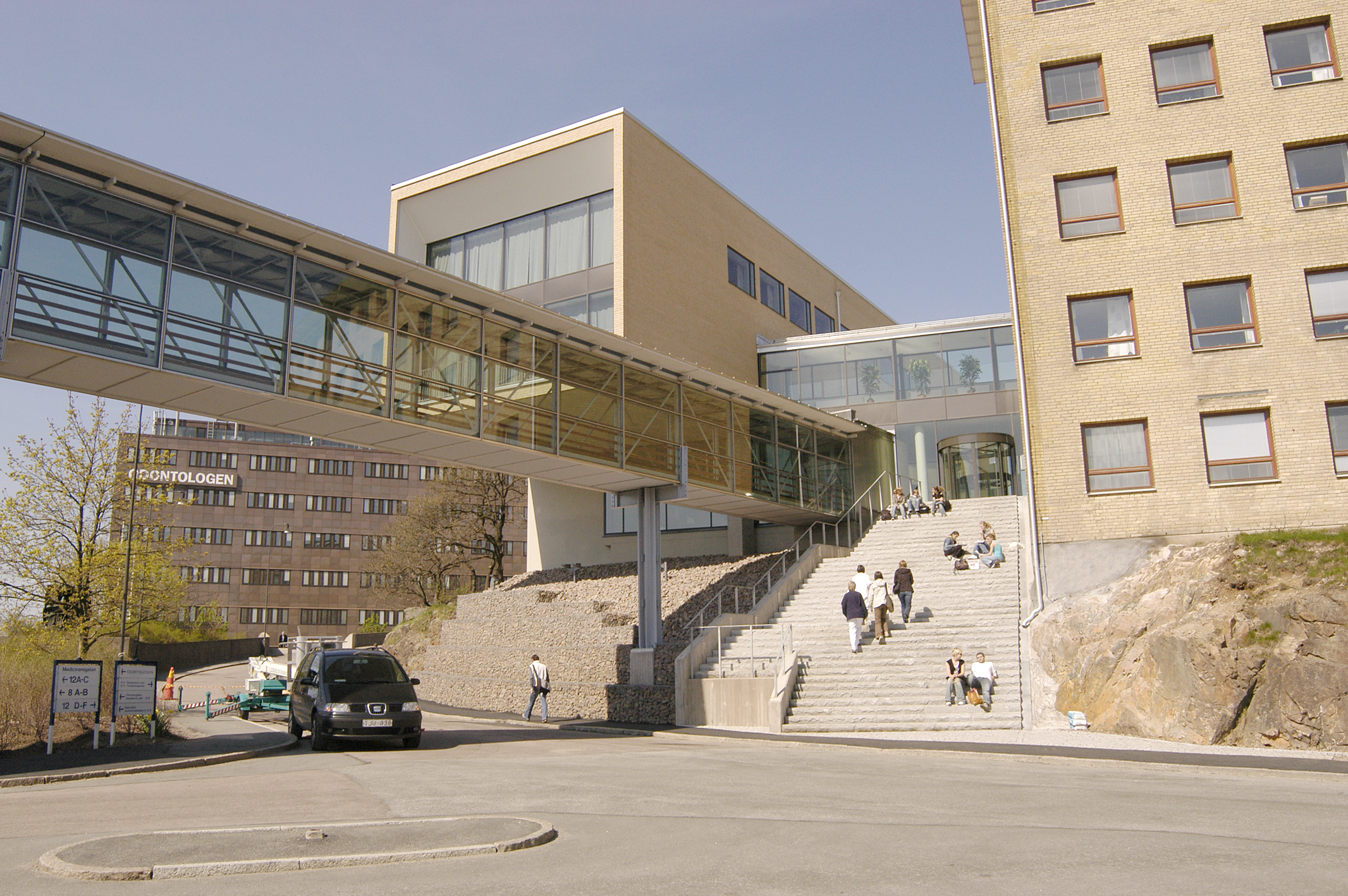
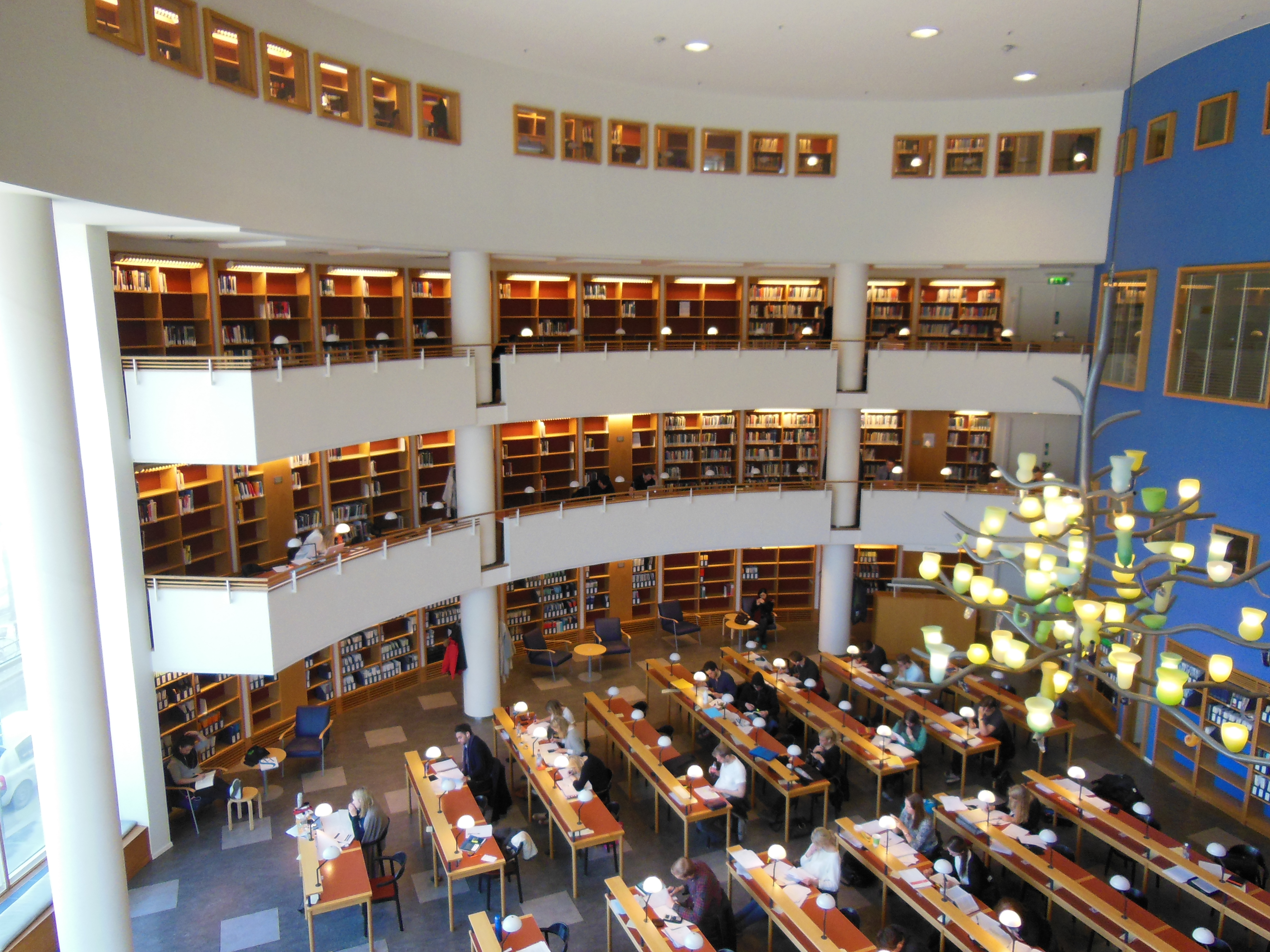
Modern architecture: Sahlgrenska Academy (left) and the reading hall of the School of Business and Law (right).
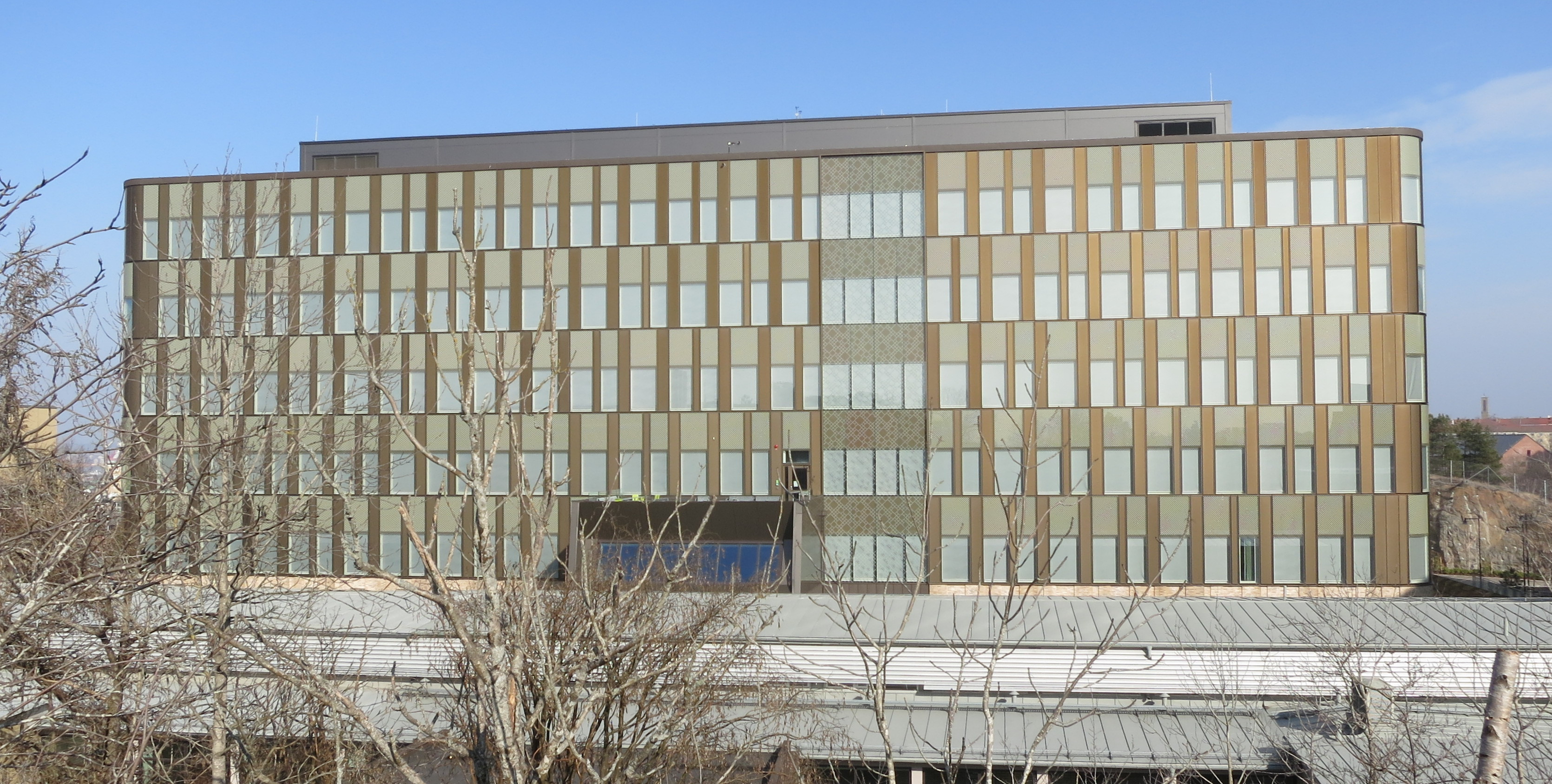
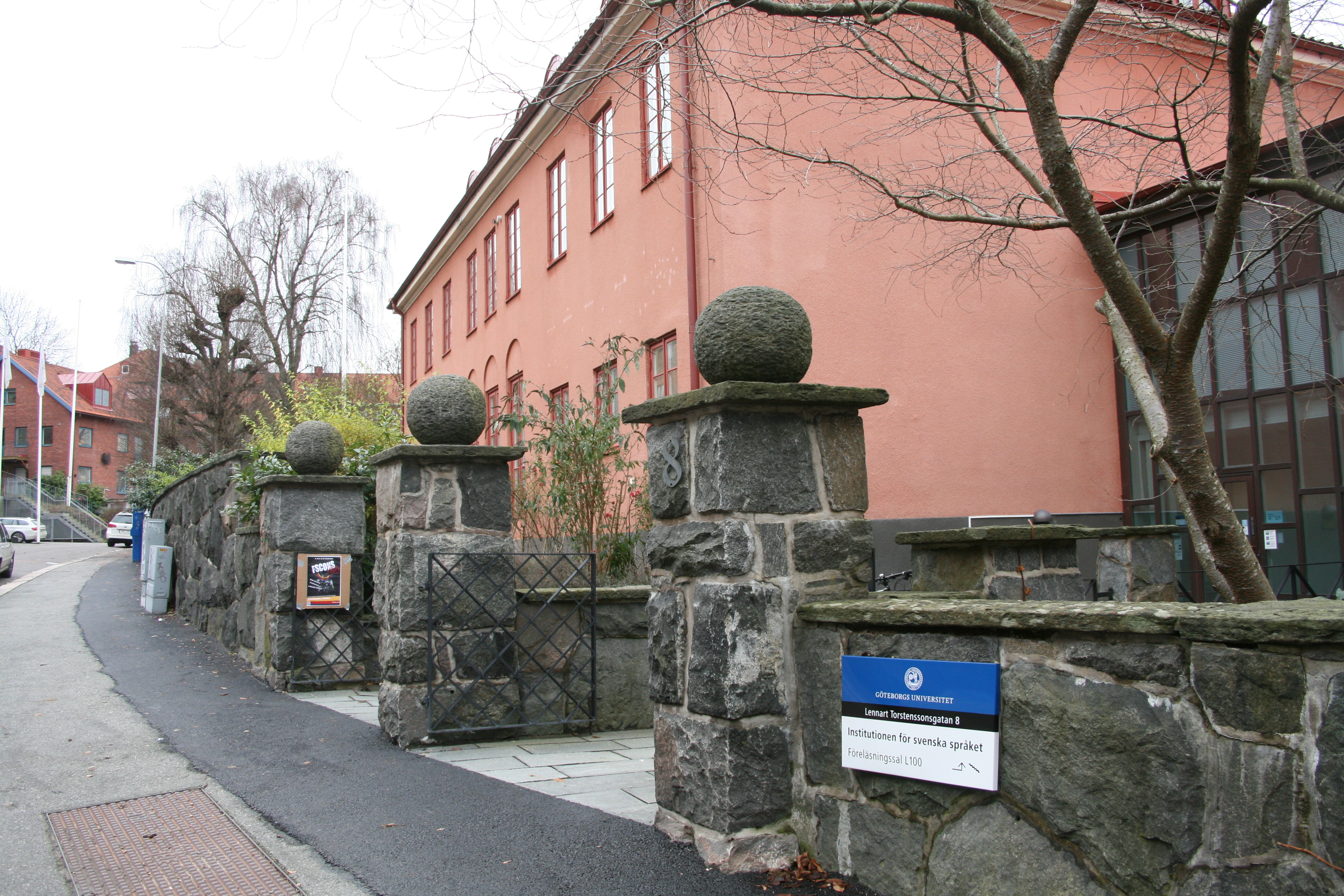
GU offers a large variety of academic disciplines, e.g. Department of Geosciences at the Faculty of Natural Sciences (left) and Department of Swedish Studies (right).

The university is organised into eight academic faculties. Collaboration across faculty and subject boundaries is emphasised in the university's research and education strategies. All faculties takes advantage of this possibility and are active participants in a multitude of cross-disciplinary research and education activities within the framework of the university. The university closely cooperates with Chalmers University of Technology, a fact that further increases the total scope of the academic environment in Gothenburg.

- The Artistic Faculty (Konstnärliga fakulteten) offers courses in the fields of design and crafts, film studies, photography, scene, music and fine arts.
- The Faculty of Education (Utbildningsvetenskapliga fakulteten) is responsible for teacher training in various subjects.
- The Faculty of Humanities (Humanistiska fakulteten) comprises the humanities, for instance cultural studies, history, literature, history of ideas, religion, archeology, modern languages, philosophy, linguistics, theory of science and Swedish language and literature.

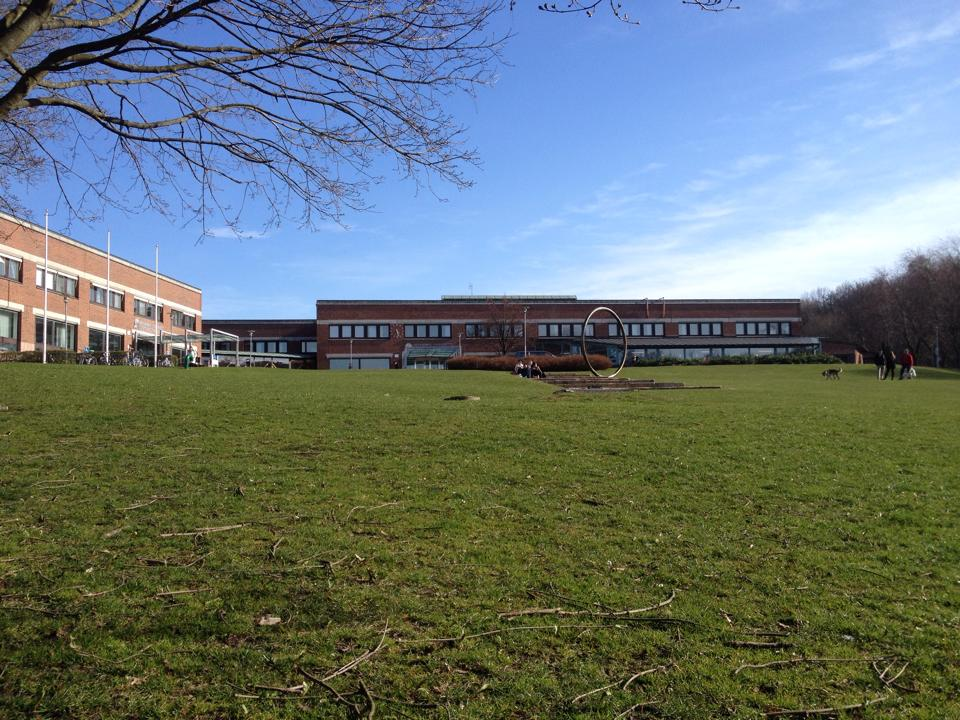
The Faculty of Arts

- The IT Faculty (IT fakulteten) offers programmes in applied information technology, computer science and engineering.
- The Faculty of Natural Sciences (Naturvetenskapliga fakulteten) covers a number of science disciplines such as botany, cell and molecular biology, physics, earth sciences, chemistry, conservation, marine ecology, mathematics, environmental science, and zoology.
- The Sahlgrenska Academy (Sahlgrenska Akademin) is the faculty of medicine at the University of Gothenburg. Research and education in medicine, odontology and health and care sciences.
- The School of Business, Economics and Law (Handelshögskolan vid Göteborgs universitet) is a business school and a law school.
- The Faculty of Social Sciences (Samhällsvetenskapliga fakulteten) offers courses in peace and development studies, public administration, journalism, psychology, social anthropology, social work, sociology, political science, and European studies.

== World ranking ==
University rankings

Global – Overall
- ARWU World: 101–150 (2024)
- QS World: 202 (2026)
- THE World: 201–250 (2025)
- USNWR Global: =160 (2025)

University of Gothenburg was ranked number 201 in the world by Times Higher Educations 2023.

== Notable people ==
=== Alumni ===
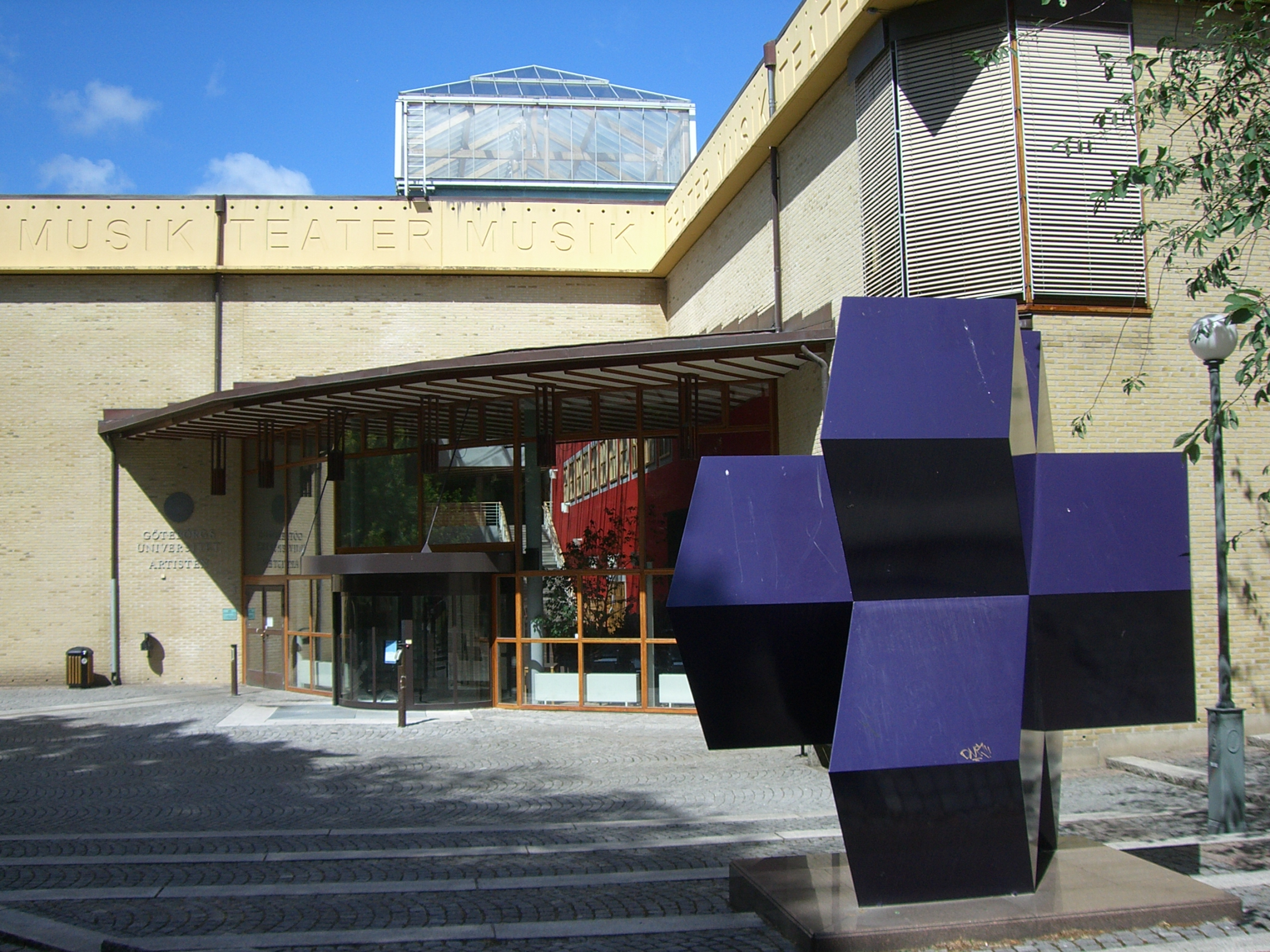
Artisten – Academy of Music and Drama

- Sture Allén, computer linguist, former permanent secretary of the Swedish Academy
- Jens Allwood, linguist
- Muhammad al-Yaqoubi, Syrian Islamic scholar
- Dilruba Z. Ara, writer
- Percy Barnevik, industry leader, former CEO of Asea Brown Boveri
- Nick Bostrom, philosopher and futurist, and Director of the Future of Humanity Institute at Oxford University
- Malin Byström, operatic soprano
- Arvid Carlsson, Nobel Prize laureate in Medicine, 2000
- Magnus Carlsson, singer
- Ernst Cassirer, German philosopher
- Fredy Clue, artist and musician
- Adam Cwejman (born 1985), politician
- Östen Dahl, linguist (member of the Royal Swedish Academy of Sciences, Royal Swedish Academy of Letters, History and Antiquities and Academia Europaea)
- Åke Edwardson, author (used to teach journalism)
- Jan Eliasson, diplomat and politician (former President of the United Nations General Assembly, former Minister of Foreign Affairs of the Kingdom of Sweden)
- Carl Henrik Fredriksson, literary critic, columnist, essayist, and translator
- José González, singer
- Hans Hagnell, politician
- Gunnar D Hansson, author
- Eli Heckscher (1879–1952), political economist and economic historian, professor at the Stockholm School of Economics
- Heiða Björg Hilmisdóttir, Icelandic politician
- Tore Janson, linguist.
- Ann-Sofie Johansson, Creative Advisor and former Head of Design for H&M
- Jonas Jonasson, author of The Hundred-Year-Old Man Who Climbed Out the Window and Disappeared.

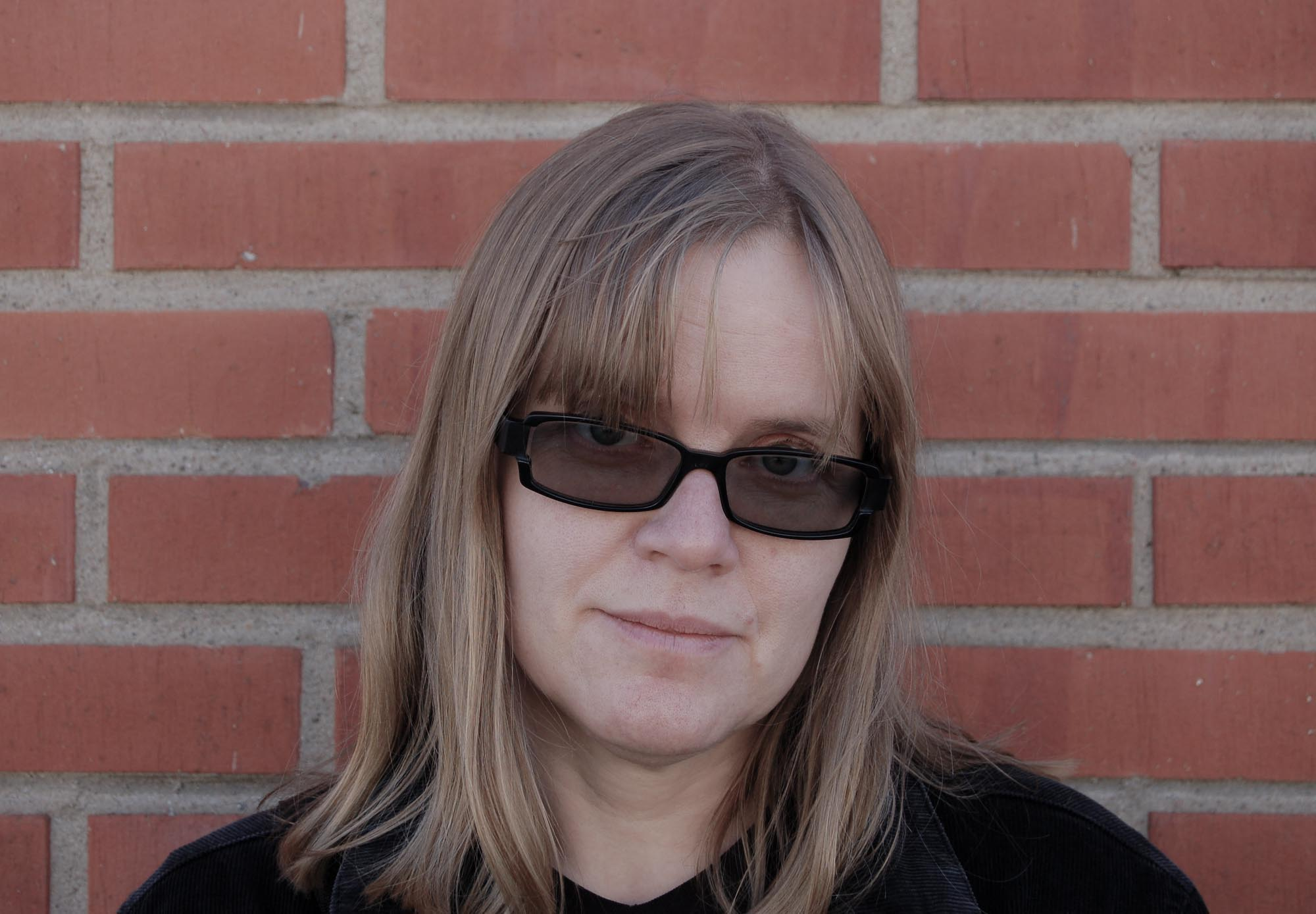
Lotta Lotass, writer and former member of the Swedish Academy

- Bernhard Karlgren, sinologist
- Nils Kock, developer of the Kock pouch surgical procedure
- Juri Kurol, orthodontist
- Erik Lönnroth, historian (Member of the Swedish Academy)
- Lotta Lotass, writer and literary scholar (former Member of the Swedish Academy)
- Cecilia Malmström, former European Commissioner
- Aleksandra Mir, Swedish-American visual artist
- Njuguna Ndungu, economist, Governor and chairman of the Board of the Central Bank of Kenya
- Leif Pagrotsky (born 1951), politician, economist, and diplomat
- Bo Ralph, linguist (Member of the Swedish Academy)
- Bo Rothstein, political scientist
- Susanna Roxman, Anglophone poet and critic
- Ferdinando Sardella (born 1960), scholar of the history of religions
- Gudrun Slettengren-Fernholm, artist
- Elisabeth Söderberg (née Weixlgärtner; 1912–1991), Austrian-born Swedish painter, textile artist, and art teacher
- Anna Wåhlin, Antarctic researcher, oceanographer
- Martin Wallström, actor
- Maria Wetterstrand, politician (Green Party)
- Agnes Wold, professor of clinical bacteriology

=== Vice-Chancellors of the University of Gothenburg ===
- 1891 Axel Kock
- 1891–1893 Hjalmar Edgren
- 1893–1899 Johannes Paulson
- 1899–1909 Johan Vising
- 1909–1914 Ludvig Stavenow
- 1914–1931 Otto Sylwan
- 1931–1936 Bernhard Karlgren
- 1936–1951 Curt Weibull
- 1951–1966 Hjalmar Frisk
- 1966–1972 Bo Eric Ingelmark
- 1972–1982 Georg Lundgren
- 1982–1986 Kjell Härnqvist
- 1986–1992 Jan S. Nilsson
- 1992–1997 Jan Ling
- 1997–2003 Bo Samuelsson
- 2003–2006 Gunnar Svedberg
- 2006–2017 Pam Fredman
- 2017–2023 Eva Wiberg
- 1 July 2023 Malin Broberg

== See also ==
- Chalmers University of Technology
- GOArt
- Gothenburg quadricentennial jubilee
- List of universities in Sweden
- Royal Society of Sciences and Letters in Gothenburg
- The International Science Festival in Gothenburg
- Sahlgrenska University Hospital
