= Delft University of Technology =

Dutch university

- Technische Universiteit Delft
- Former names: Koninklijke Akademie van Delft; Polytechnische School van Delft; Technische Hoogeschool van Delft
- Motto in English: Challenge the Future
- Type: Public, technical
- Established: January 8, 1842; 184 years ago
- Affiliations: IDEA; Climate-KIC; CESAER; EUA; 4TU; UNITECH; SEFI; SAE; TPC; ATHENS; PEGASUS; ENHANCE Alliance
- Budget: € 1,093 million (2024)
- President: Ingrid Thijssen
- Rector: Professor Hester Bijl
- Faculty: 1,356 faculty members of all ranks (Docent, Assistant, Associate, and Full Professor; 2025)
- Administrative staff: 2,870 (2025) and 1,131 research staff (2025)
- Students: 26,502 (2025)
- Undergraduates: 13,312 (2025)
- Postgraduates: 12,814 (2025)
- Doctoral students: 3,454 (2025)
- Location: Delft, Netherlands; 52°0′6″N 4°22′21″E
- Campus: Urban (university town)
- Colors: Cyan, black and white
- Website: tudelft.nl/en/

The Delft University of Technology (TU Delft; Dutch: Technische Universiteit Delft) is the oldest and largest Dutch public technical university, located in Delft, Netherlands. It specializes in engineering, technology, computing, design, and natural sciences.

It is considered one of the leading technical universities in Europe and is consistently ranked as one of the best schools for architecture and engineering in the world. According to the QS World University Rankings it ranked 3rd worldwide for architecture and 13th for Engineering & Technology in 2024. It also ranked 3rd best worldwide for mechanical and aerospace engineering, 3rd for civil and structural engineering, 11th for chemical engineering, and 12th for design.

With eight faculties and multiple research institutes, TU Delft educates around 27,000 students (undergraduate and postgraduate), and employs more than 3,500 doctoral candidates and close to 4,500 teaching, research, support and management staff (including more than 1,300 faculty members of all academic ranks in the Netherlands).

The university was established on 8 January 1842 by King William II as a royal academy, with the primary purpose of training civil servants for work in the Dutch East Indies. The school expanded its research and education curriculum over time, becoming a polytechnic school in 1864 and an institute of technology (making it a full-fledged university) in 1905. It changed its name to Delft University of Technology in 1986.

Dutch Nobel laureates Jacobus Henricus van 't Hoff, Heike Kamerlingh Onnes, and Simon van der Meer have been associated with TU Delft. TU Delft is a member of several university federations, including the IDEA League, CESAER, UNITECH International, ENHANCE Alliance, LDE, and 4TU.

== History ==
=== Royal Academy (1842–1864) ===
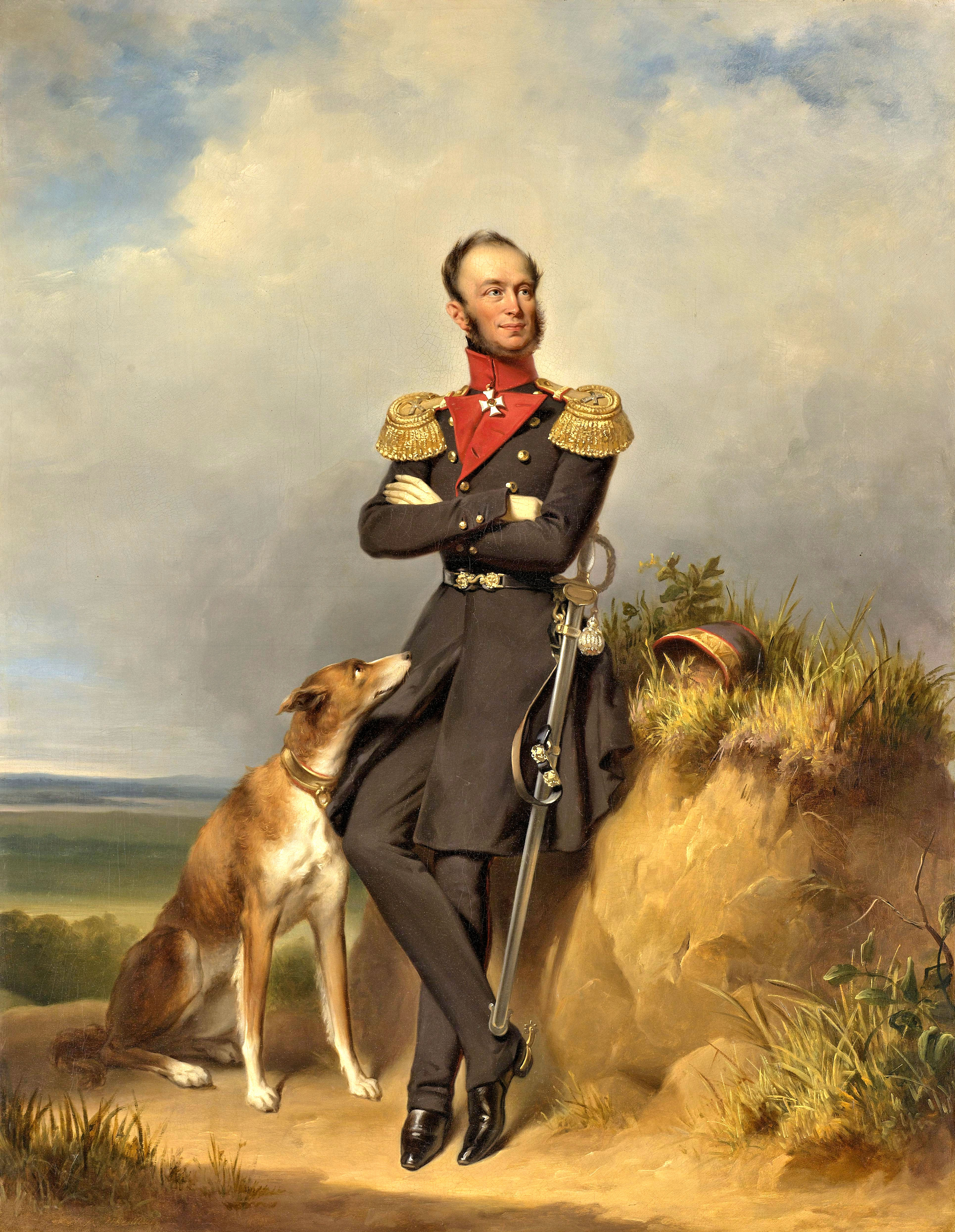
William II of the Netherlands, founder of Royal Academy in Delft.

Delft University of Technology was founded on 8 January 1842 by William II of the Netherlands as Royal Academy for the education of civilian engineers, for serving both nation and industry, and of apprentices for trade. One of the purposes of the academy was to educate civil servants for the colonies of the Dutch East India Company. The first director of the academy was Antoine Lipkens, constructor of the first Dutch optical telegraph, called simply as Lipkens. Royal Academy had its first building located at Oude Delft 95 in Delft. On 23 May 1863 an Act was passed imposing regulations on technical education in the Netherlands, bringing it under the rules of secondary education.

=== Polytechnic School (1864–1905) ===
On 20 June 1864, Royal Academy in Delft was disbanded by a Royal Decree, giving a way to a Polytechnic School of Delft (Politechnische School te Delft). The newly formed school educated engineers of various fields and architects, much needed during the rapid industrialization period in the 19th century.

=== Institute of Technology (1905–1986) ===
Yet another Act, passed on 22 May 1905, changed the name of the school to Technical College (Institute) of Delft (Technische Hoogeschool Delft, from 1934 Technische Hogeschool Delft), emphasizing the academic quality of the education. Polytechnic was granted university rights and was allowed to award academic degrees. The number of students reached 450 around that time. The official opening of the new school was attended by Queen Wilhelmina on 10 July 1905. First dean of the newly established college was ir. J. Kraus, hydraulic engineer. In 1905, the first doctoral degree was awarded. From 1924 until the construction of the new campus in 1966, the ceremonies were held in the Saint Hippolytus Chapel.

Corporate rights were granted to the college on 7 June 1956. Most of the university buildings during that time were located within Delft city centre, with some of the buildings set on the side of the river Schie, in the Wippolder district.

Student organizations grew together with the university. The first to be established on 22 March 1848 is the Delftsch Studenten Corps housed in the distinctive Sociëteit Phoenix on the Phoenixstraat. This was followed by the Delftsche Studenten Bond (est. 30 October 1897) and the KSV Sanctus Virgilius (est. 2 March 1898). In 1917, Proof Garden for Technical Plantation (Dutch: Cultuurtuin voor Technische Gewassen) was established by Gerrit van Iterson, which today is known as Botanical Garden of TU Delft. In that period, a first female professor, Toos Korvezee, was appointed.

=== Delft University of Technology (1986–present) ===
After the end of World War II, TU Delft increased its rapid academic expansion. Studium Generale was established at all universities in the Netherlands, including TU Delft, to promote a free and accessible knowledge related to culture, technology, society and science. Because of the increasing number of students, in 1974 the first Reception Week for First Year Students (Ontvangst Week voor Eerstejaars Studenten, OWEE) was established, which has become a TU Delft tradition since then.

In September 1986, the Delft Institute of Technology officially changed its name to Delft University of Technology, underlining the quality of the education and research provided by the institution. In the course of further expansion, in 1987 Delft Top Tech institute was established, which provided a professional master education in management for people working in technology-related companies. In September 1997, the 13 faculties of the TU Delft were merged into 9, to improve the management efficiency of the growing university. In the early 1990s, because the vast majority of the students of the university were male, an initiative to increase the number of female students resulted in founding a separate emancipation commission. As a result, Girls Study Technology (Meiden studeren techniek) days were established. In later years the responsibilities of the commission were distributed over multiple institutes.

Since 2006 all buildings of the university are located outside of the historical city center of Delft. The relatively new building of Material Sciences department was sold, later demolished in 2007 to give place for a newly built building of the Haagse Hogeschool. Closer cooperation between TU Delft and Dutch universities of applied sciences resulted in physical transition of some of the institutes from outside to Delft. In September 2009 many institutes of applied sciences from the Hague region as well as Institute of Applied Sciences in Rijswijk, transferred to Delft, close to the location of the university, at the square between Rotterdamseweg and Leeghwaterstraat.

In 2007 the three Dutch technical universities, TU Delft, TU Eindhoven and University of Twente, established a federation, called 3TU.

On 13 May 2008, the building of the Faculty of Architecture was destroyed by fire, presumed caused by a short circuit in a coffee machine due to a ruptured water pipe. The collections that were located on or above the second floor were lost. A furniture collection, the library and prints and maps, which were located on the first floor, the ground floor or in the basement, were saved. The architecture library, containing several thousands of books and maps, as well as many architecture models, including chairs by Gerrit Rietveld and Le Corbusier, were saved. The Faculty of Architecture is currently housed in the university's former main building.

== Logo ==
Through the course of the years the logo of the TU Delft changed a number of times, along with its official name. The current logo is based on the three university colors cyan, black and white. The letter "T" bears a stylized flame on top, referring to the flame that Prometheus brought from Mount Olympus to the people, against the will of Zeus. Because of this, Prometheus is sometimes considered as the first engineer, and is an important symbol for the university. His statue stands in the center of the newly renovated TU Delft campus, Mekelpark. It was stolen in 2012, and subsequently replaced with a newly-designed statue in 2016.

== Campus ==
Initially, all of the university buildings were located in the historic city centre of Delft. This changed in the second half of the 20th century with relocations to a separate university neighbourhood. The last university building in the historic centre of Delft was the university library, which was relocated to a new building in 1997. On 12 September 2006, the design of the new university neighbourhood, Mekelpark, was officially approved, giving a green light to the transformation of the area around the Mekelweg (the main road on the university terrain) into a new campus heart. The new park replaced the main access road and redirected car traffic around the campus, making the newly created park a safer place for bicycles and pedestrians.

=== Mekelpark ===
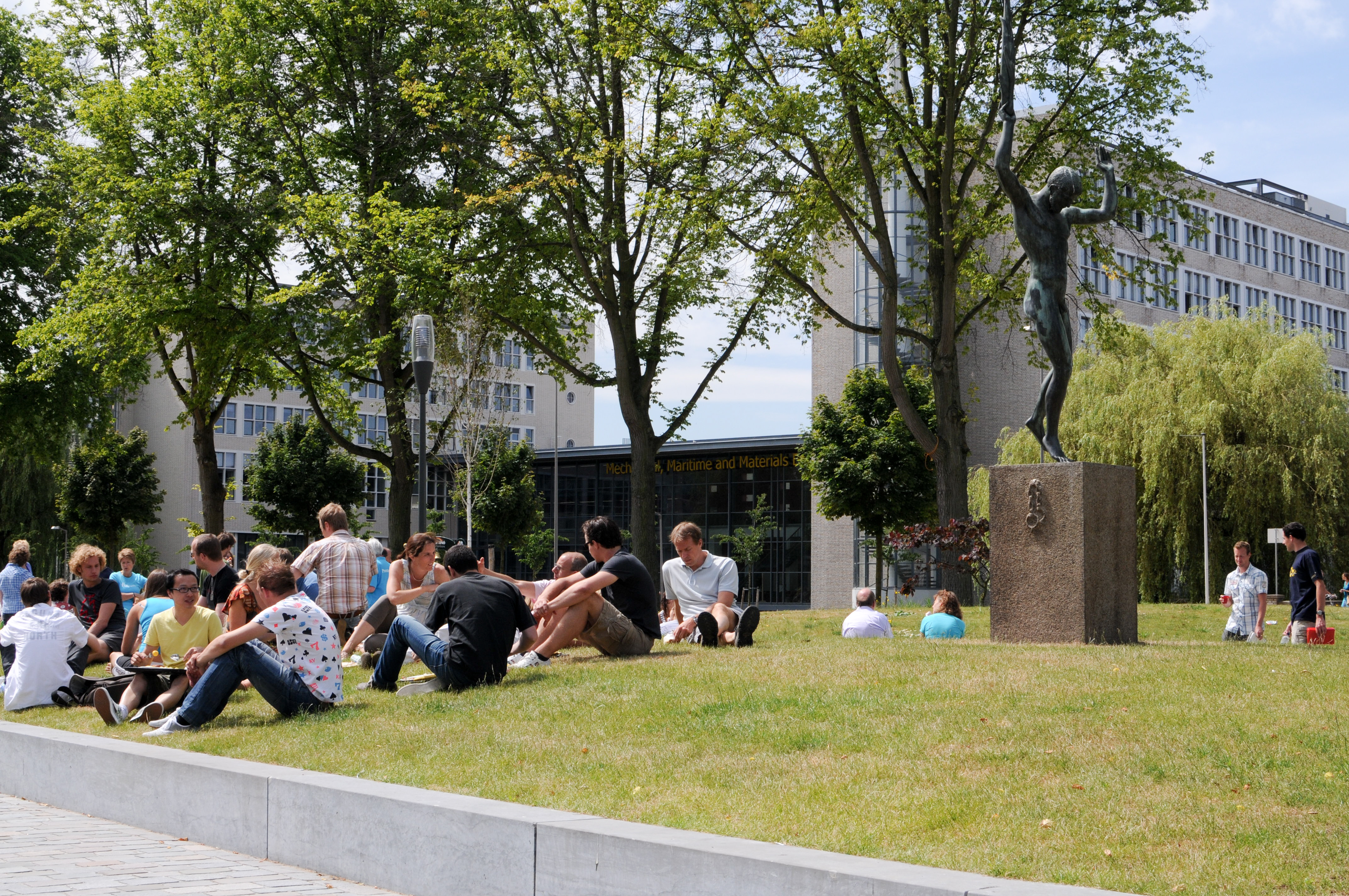
Entrance to the Mekelpark, with the statue of Prometheus, university's symbol.

A new university neighborhood called Mekelpark (its name commemorating TH Delft professor and WW II resistance fighter, Jan Mekel, who was executed by the Nazis on 2 May 1942 in Sachsenhausen) was opened on 5 July 2009. Mekelpark replaced old parking structures, bike lanes and filling stations, constructed between faculty buildings of the university in the late 1950s. Its 832-meter-long promenade eased the commute between faculty buildings. Both sides of the promenade are covered by stone benches, 1547 meters long in total. Some of the university buildings around the Mekelpark deserve certain attention.

==== Aula ====
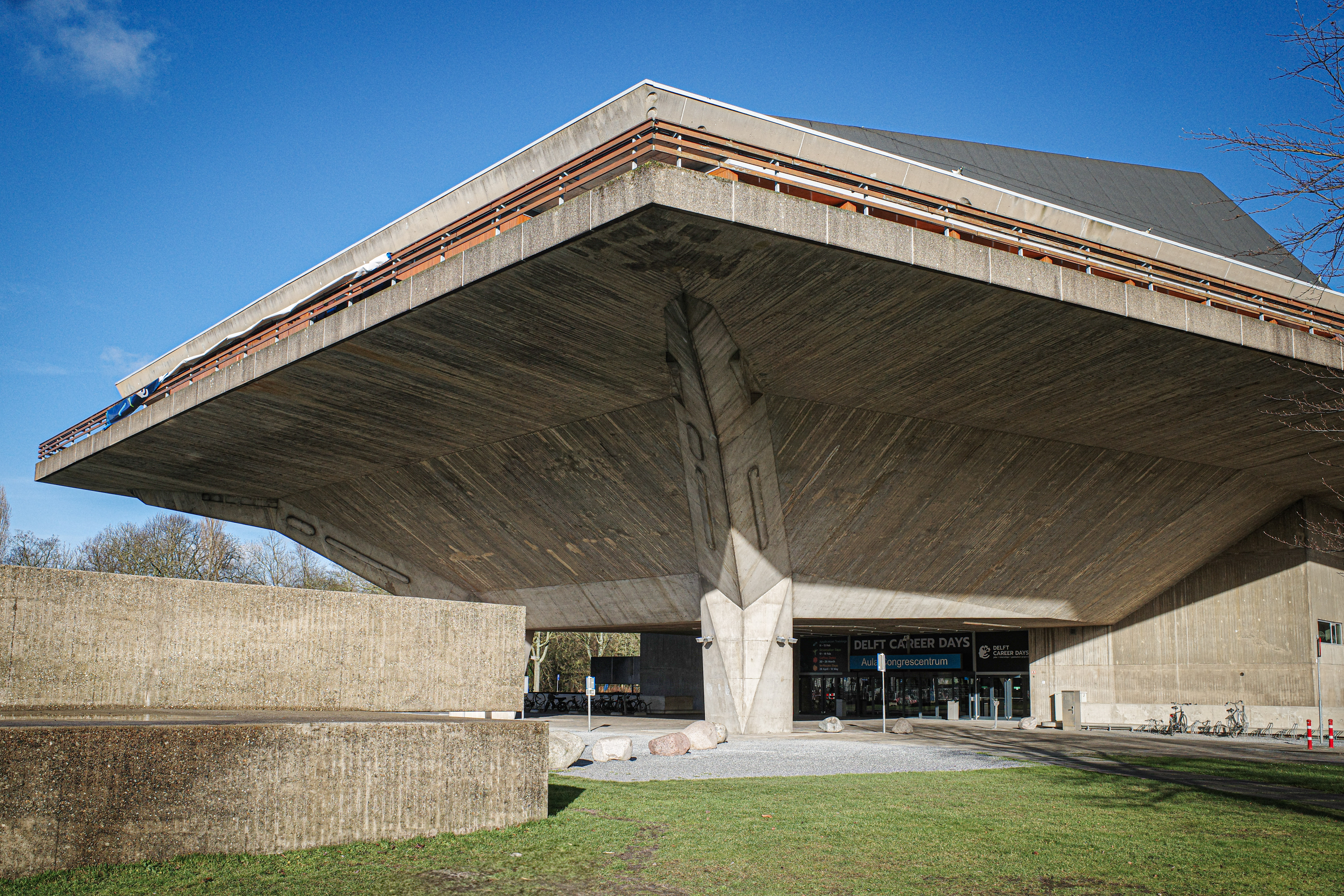
TU Delft Aula

TU Delft Aula was designed by Van den Broek en Bakema architecture bureau, founded by two TU Delft alumni Jo van den Broek and Jaap Bakema. It was officially opened in January 1966 by Dutch Prime Minister Jo Cals. It is a classical example of a structure built in Brutalist style. TU Delft Aula, which symbolically opens the Mekelpark, houses main university restaurant and store, as well as lecture halls, auditoria, congress center, and administrative offices of the university. All doctoral promotion, honoris causa ceremonies, as well as academic senate meetings take place in the Aula.

==== Library ====
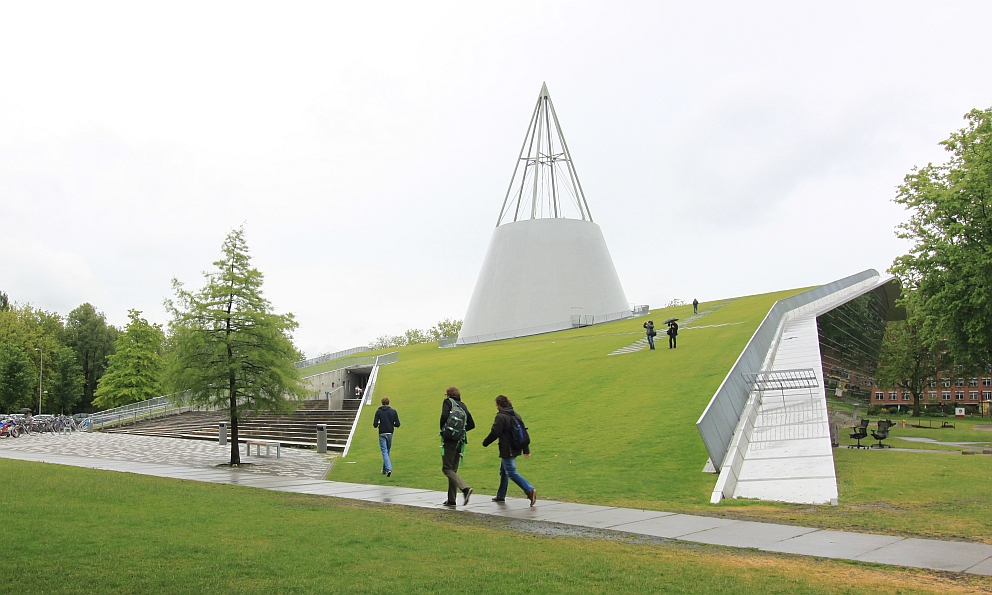
TU Delft Library

The TU Delft Library, constructed in 1997, was designed by Delft-based Mecanoo architecture bureau. It is located behind university aula. The roof of the library is covered with grass, which serves as a natural insulation. The structure lifts from the ground on one side allowing to walk to the top of the building. The library is topped by the steel cone, giving its unique shape. All the walls are completely filled with glass. The library won the Dutch National Steel Prize in 1998 in the buildings of steel and hybrid constructions category. The library is also host of the 4TU.Centre for Research Data, the archive for research data in the technical sciences in the Netherlands.

==== Cultural and Sports Center ====
The TU Delft Sports and Culture Center, recently renamed X, is located at Mekelweg 10, at the edge of the Mekelpark. It was designed by architect Vera Yanovshtchinsky and opened to TU Delft students and staff in 1995. Since then it has undergone expansions and renovations.

=== TU Delft Musea ===
Three musea are associated with the university: Science Centre Delft, Mineralogy-geology museum and Beijerinck en Kluyver archive.

Science Centre Delft was opened in September 2010 and is located at Mijnbouwstraat 120 in Delft. Science Center Delft is a successor of Technical Exhibition Center. Technical Exhibition Center was established by a group of TU Delft professors with the aim of presenting the recent advances in technology to a wider audience. Parts of the collection were shown outside of Delft: in the Netherlands, Israel, and the Czech Republic. The collection was permanently hosted in the building of former department of geodesy. The historical collections of Technical Exhibition Center were moved Delft Museum of Technology, located at Ezelsveldlaan, in the buildings of the former department of naval architecture (Werktuig- en Scheepsbouwkunde), next to the city center of Delft. As Delft city council together with TU Delft decided to move the collection close to the university campus (currently the building of the former museum are transformed into lofts), Science Centre Delft shows visitors current TU Delft research projects are available, including Eco Runner and Nuna.

Beijerinck en Kluyver archive hosts a collection of documents, exhibits and memorabilia of two scientists historically connected with the university.

Mineralogy-geology museum is a part of TU Delft Faculty of Civil Engineering and Geosciences and contains around 200,000 geological, mineralogical and crystallographical items divided into numerous sub-collections. The oldest items date back to 1842 when the TU Delft (then Delft Royal Academy) was established.

=== Hortus Botanicus ===
TU Delft Hortus Botanicus dates back to 1917, where Proof Garden for Technical Plantation (Dutch: Cultuurtuin voor Technische Gewassen) was established by Gerrit van Iterson Jr., TU Delft graduate and assistant to Martinus Beijerinck. Gerrit van Iterson Jr. was the first director of the garden until 1948. Creation of botanical gardens at TU Delft was partially a result of the increasing needs of systematized development of tropical agriculture in then Dutch colony of Dutch East Indies. Over 7000 different species of plants, including tropical and subtropical plants, herbs, and ornamental plants cover the area of almost 2.5 ha. Furthermore, more than 2000 unique species are preserved in university's greenhouses. All facilities of TU Delft Hortus Botanicus are open to the public.

=== Building 28 ===
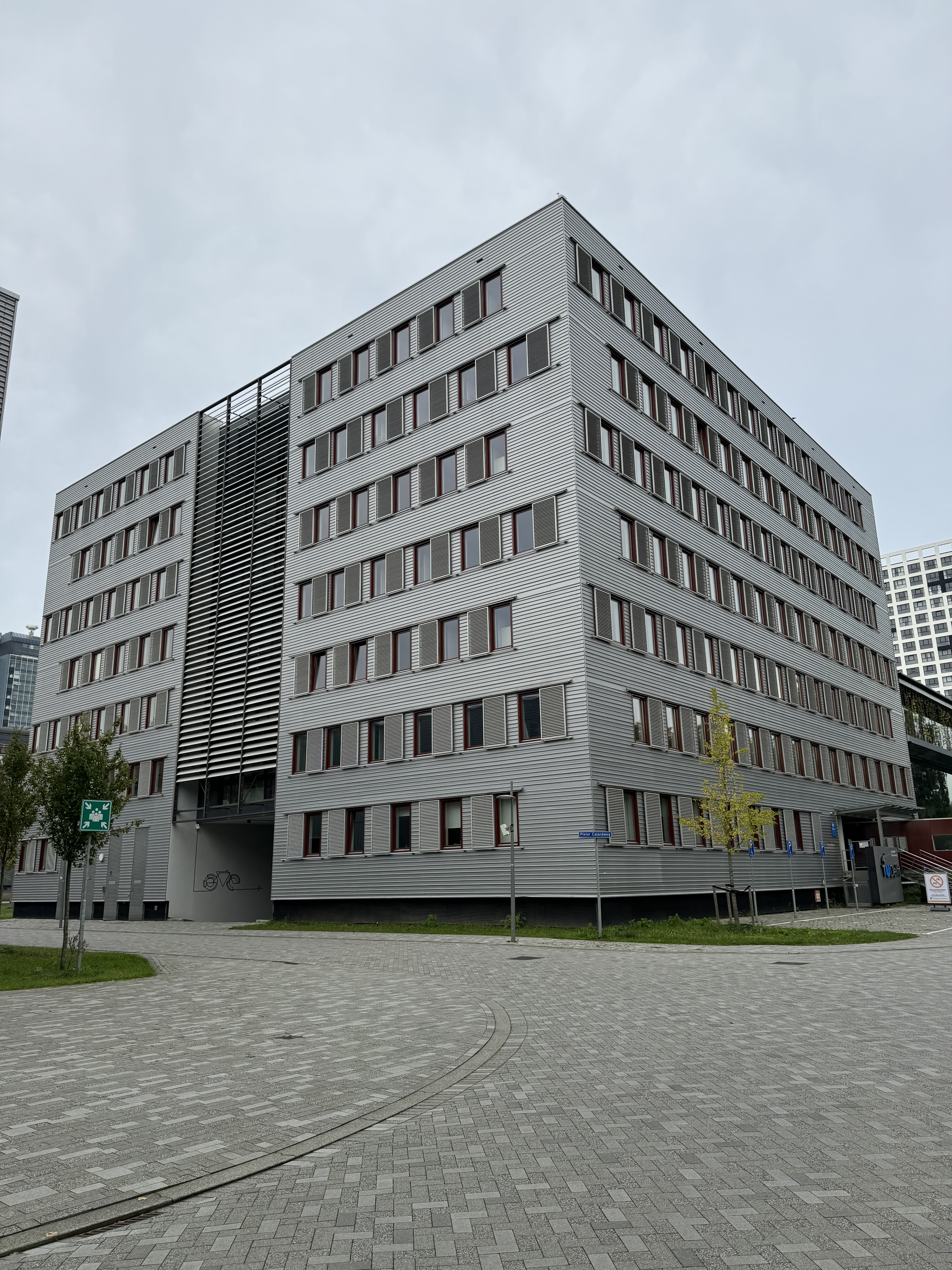
TU Delft Building 28 (Computer Science)

Building 28 is the main building of Computer Science on campus. It hosts research groups of Intelligent Systems and Software Technology departments, educational and research labs, student study areas, meeting rooms, and the support staff of Computer Science.

=== Echo (Building 29) ===
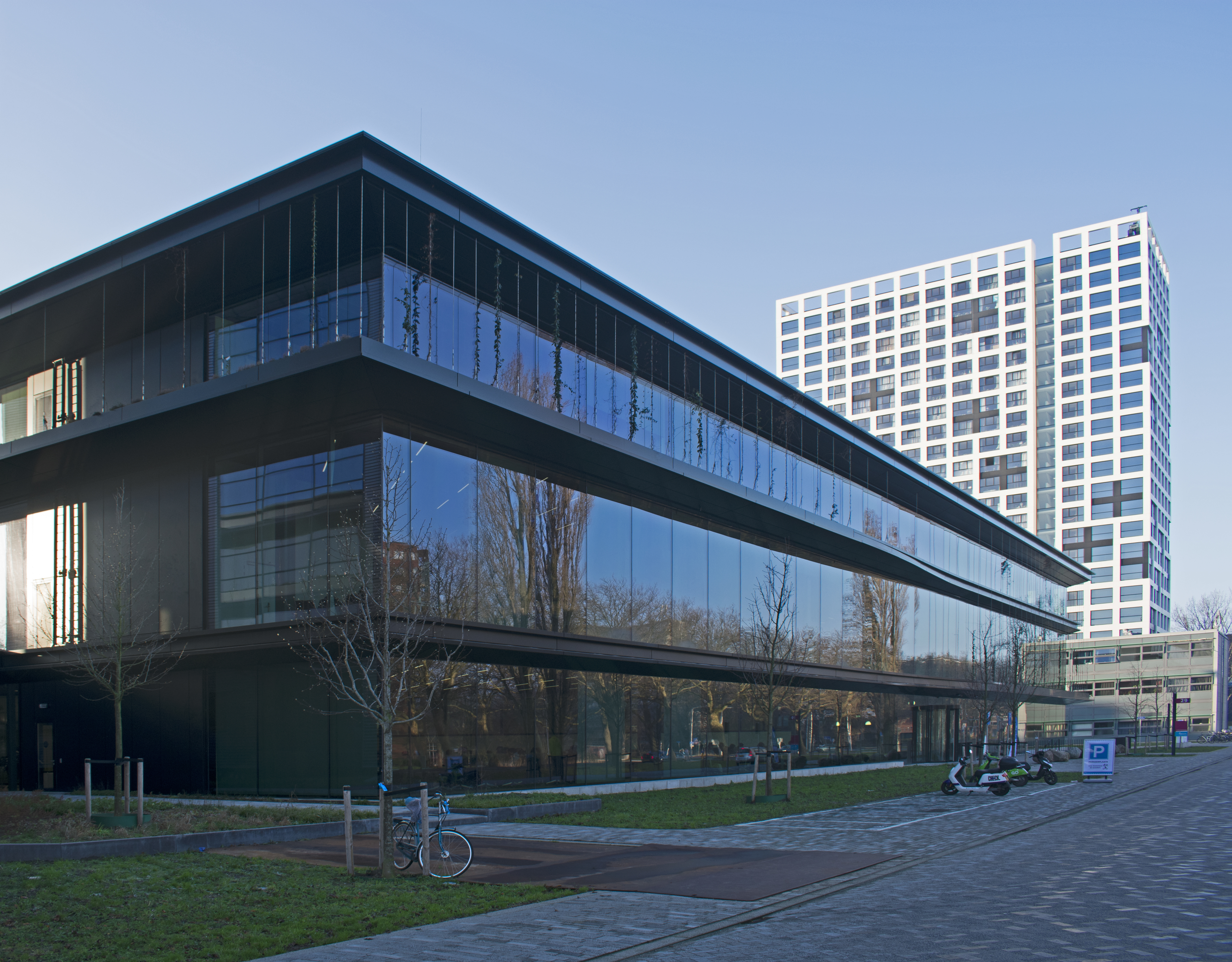
TU Delft Echo (Building 29)

Along with Delft, UNStudio developed the 'Echo' building on the TU campus for interfaculty lecture halls and project rooms, student study areas, Computer Science (Cybersecurity section and Sequential Decision Making section) research offices, and meeting rooms. It is an energy-producing building within the campus of Delft which aims at energy conservation to delve into the future. Echo won the prestigious World Prix Versailles (Campuses category) in 2023.

=== The Hague campus ===
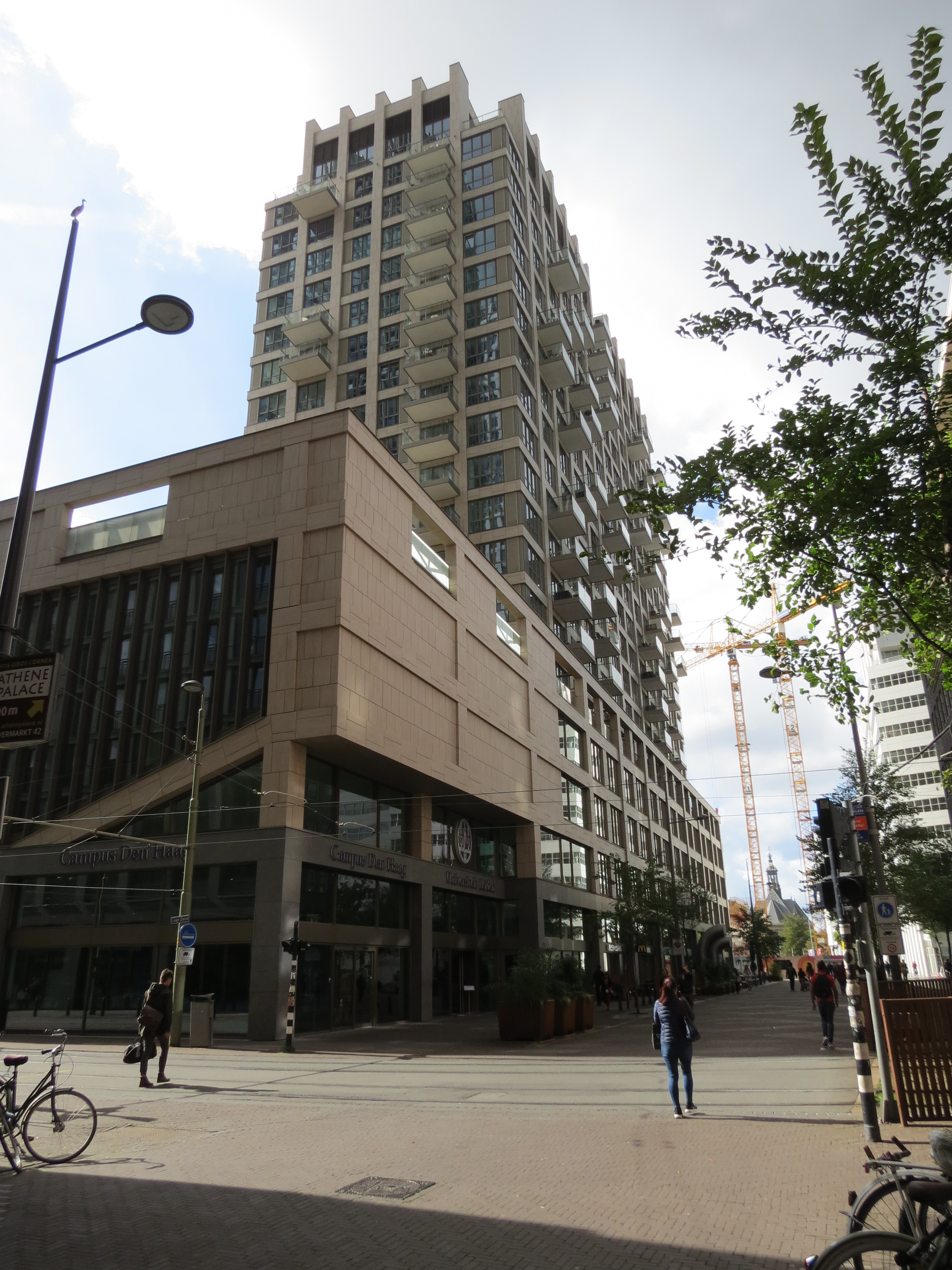
TU Delft campus at Turfmarkt 99 in The Hague. This building is shared with Leiden University.

In September 2016, TU Delft inaugurated a new campus in The Hague. The MSc programme Engineering and Policy Analysis (EPA), which teaches students to operate at the intersection of technology and policy when tackling wicked problems, was relocated to this new site to capitalize on its proximity to government ministries, international bodies, and multinational organizations.

TU Delft operates the 5th floor of the Wijnhaven Building at Turfmarkt 99 in The Hague, with the rest of the building being occupied by Leiden University. Originally the Ministry of the Interior's headquarters at Schedeldoekshaven 200, the Wijnhaven Building, named after the historic Wijnhavenkwartier, was converted into Campus The Hague in 2016.

In 2023, TU Delft announced plans to further expand its footprint in The Hague by launching a joint university facility with Leiden University, LUMC, Open University and Universities of the Netherlands at Spui, set to open in 2026. This new location is expected to accommodate around 700 TU Delft students in the city centre of The Hague and will be called University Campus Spui.

== Faculties ==
TU Delft comprises eight faculties. These are (official Dutch name and faculty abbreviation are given in brackets; departments by faculty are listed):

- Aerospace Engineering (AE) (Luchtvaart- en Ruimtevaarttechniek (LR))
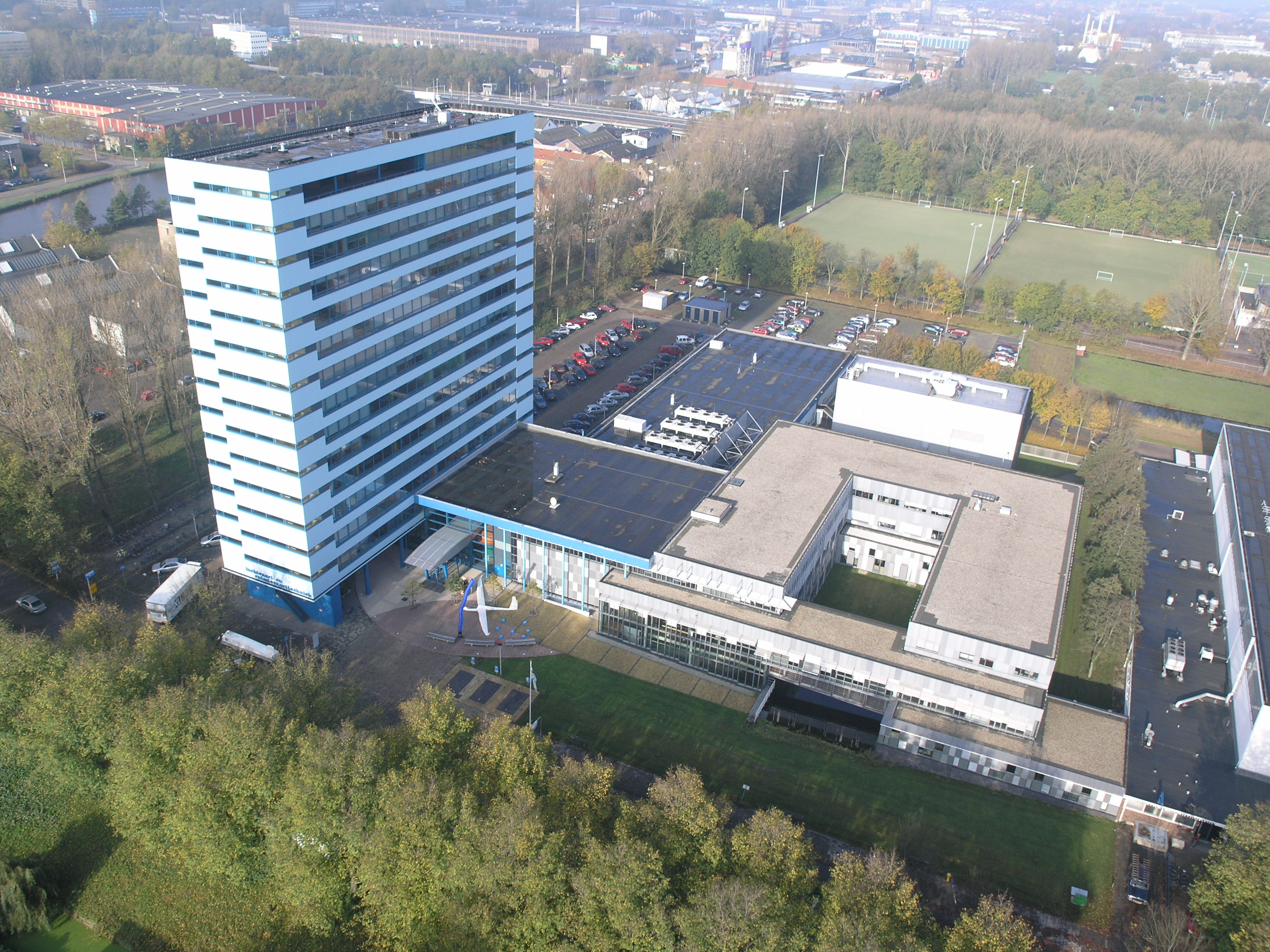
  TU Delft Faculty of Aerospace Engineering
  - Aerodynamics, Flight Performance and Propulsion & Wind Energy
  - Aerospace Structures & Materials
  - Control & operations
  - Space Engineering
- Applied Sciences (AS) (Technische Natuurwetenschappen (TNW))
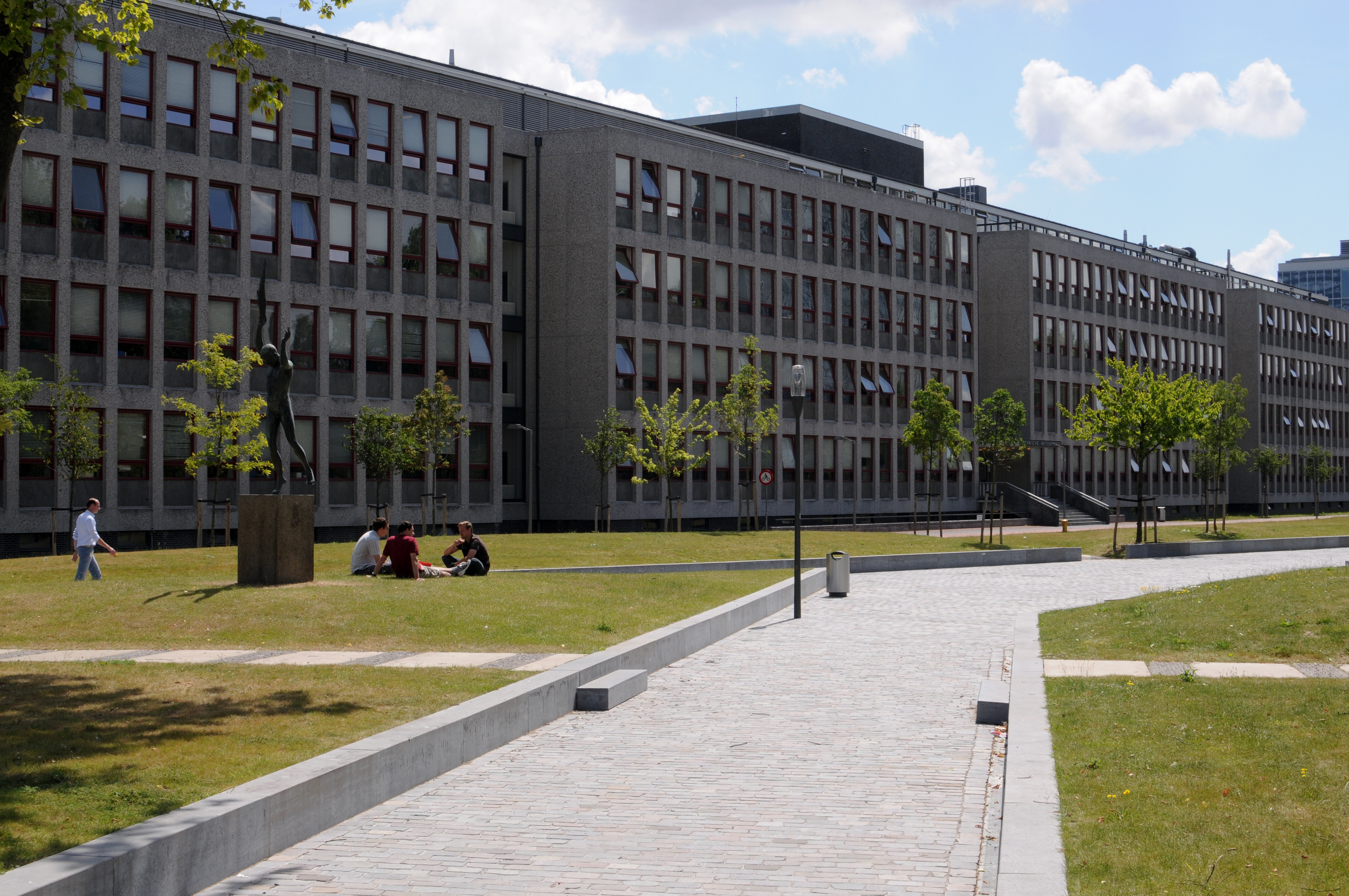
  TU Delft Faculty of Applied Sciences
  - Bionanoscience
  - Biotechnology
  - Chemical Engineering
  - Imaging Physics
  - Quantum Nanoscience
  - Radiation Science & Technology
  - Science Education and Communication
- Architecture and the Built Environment (Bouwkunde (BK))
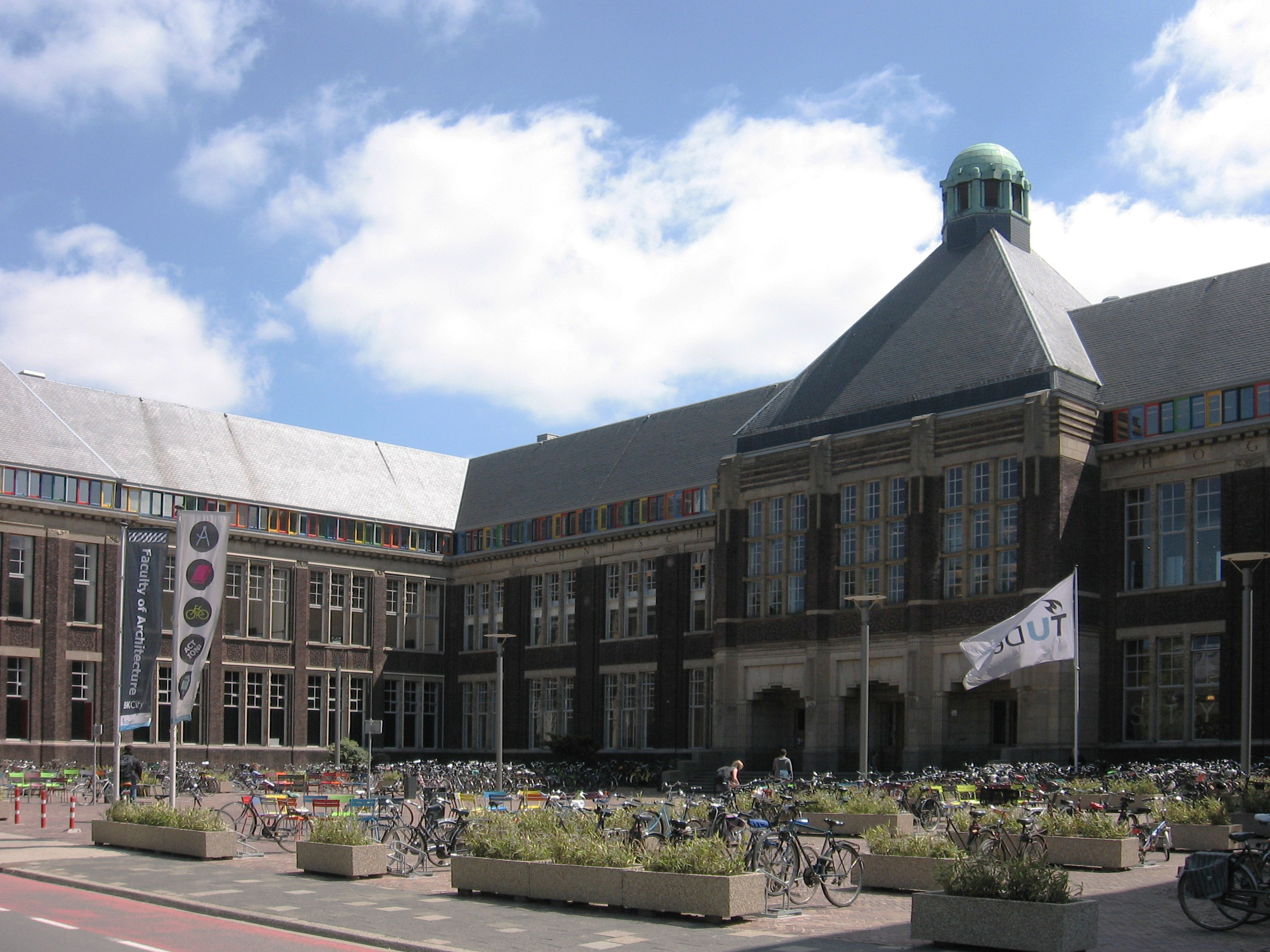
  TU Delft Faculty of Architecture and the Built Environment
  - Architecture
  - Architectural Engineering & Technology
  - Management in the Built Environment
  - Urbanism
  - Geomatics
- Civil Engineering and Geosciences (CEG) (Civiele Techniek en Geowetenschappen (CiTG))
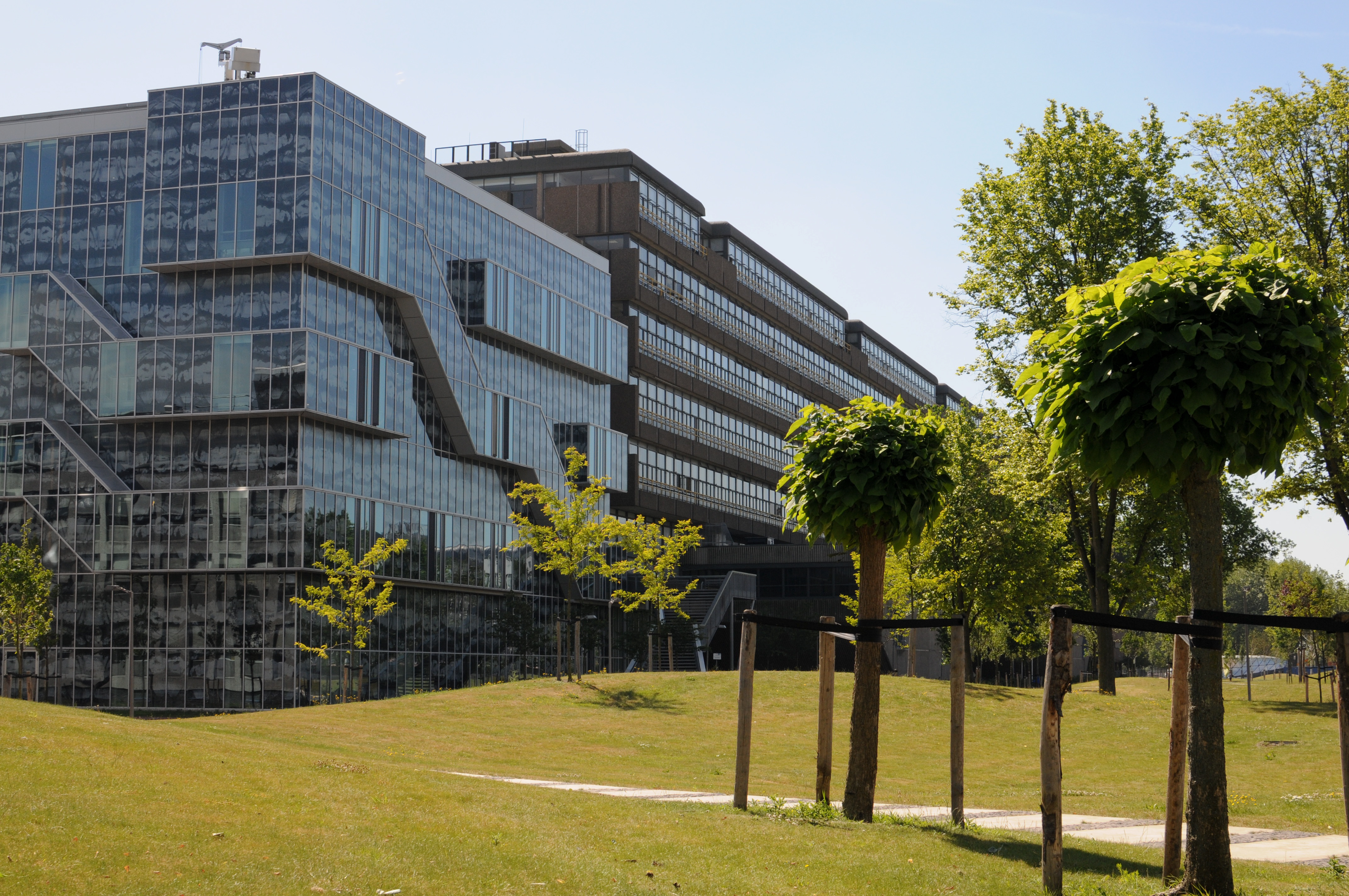
  TU Delft Faculty of Civil Engineering and Geosciences
  - Engineering Structures
  - Geoscience & Engineering
  - Geoscience & Remote Sensing
  - Hydraulic Engineering
  - Materials, Mechanics, Management & Design (3Md)
  - Transport & Planning
  - Water Management
- Electrical Engineering, Mathematics and Computer Science (EEMCS) (Elektrotechniek, Wiskunde en Informatica (EWI))
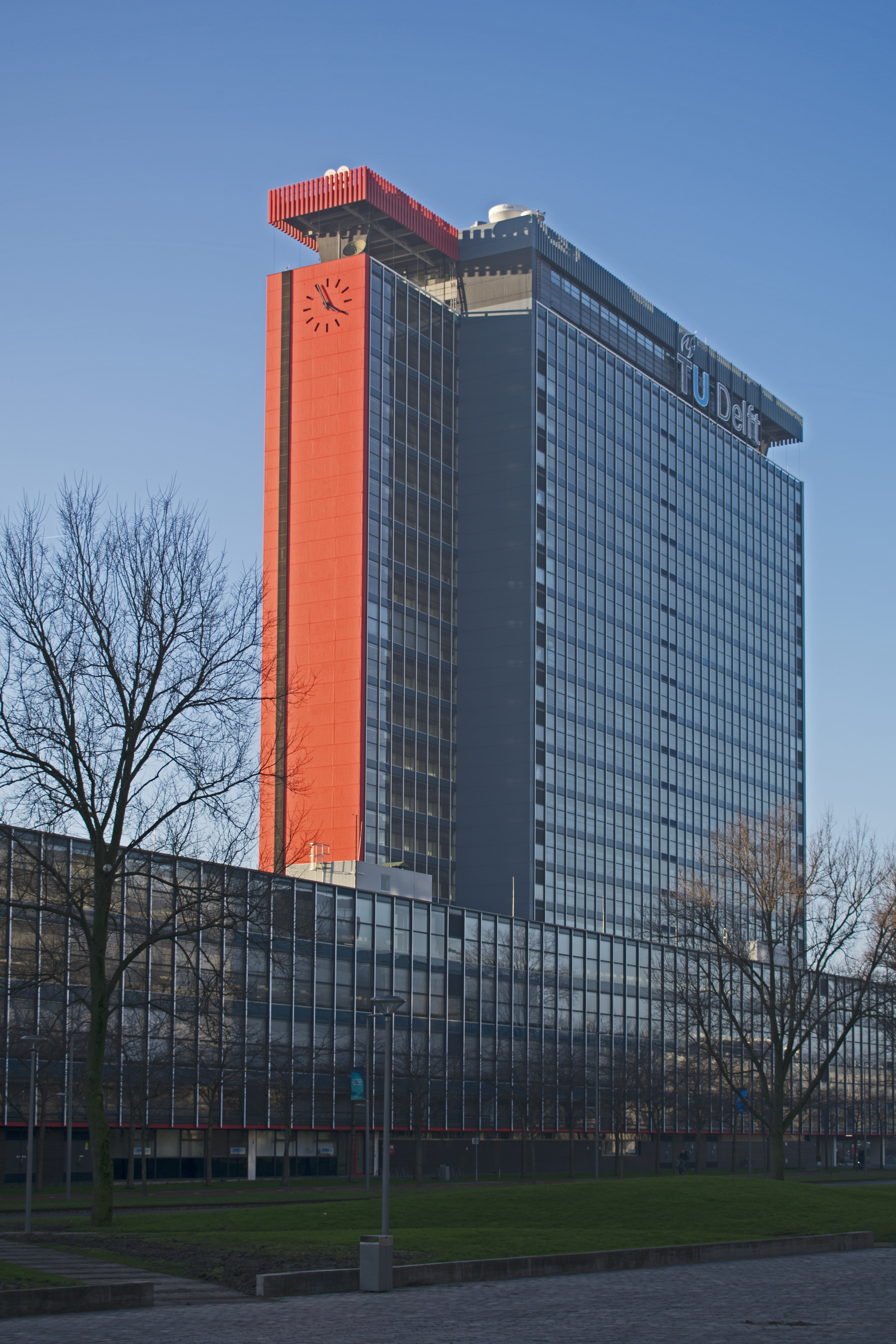
  TU Delft Faculty of Electrical Engineering, Mathematics and Computer Science
  - Applied Mathematics
  - Electrical Sustainable Energy
  - Intelligent Systems
  - Microelectronics
  - Quantum & Computer Engineering
  - Software Technology
- Industrial Design Engineering (IDE) (Industrieel Ontwerpen (IO))
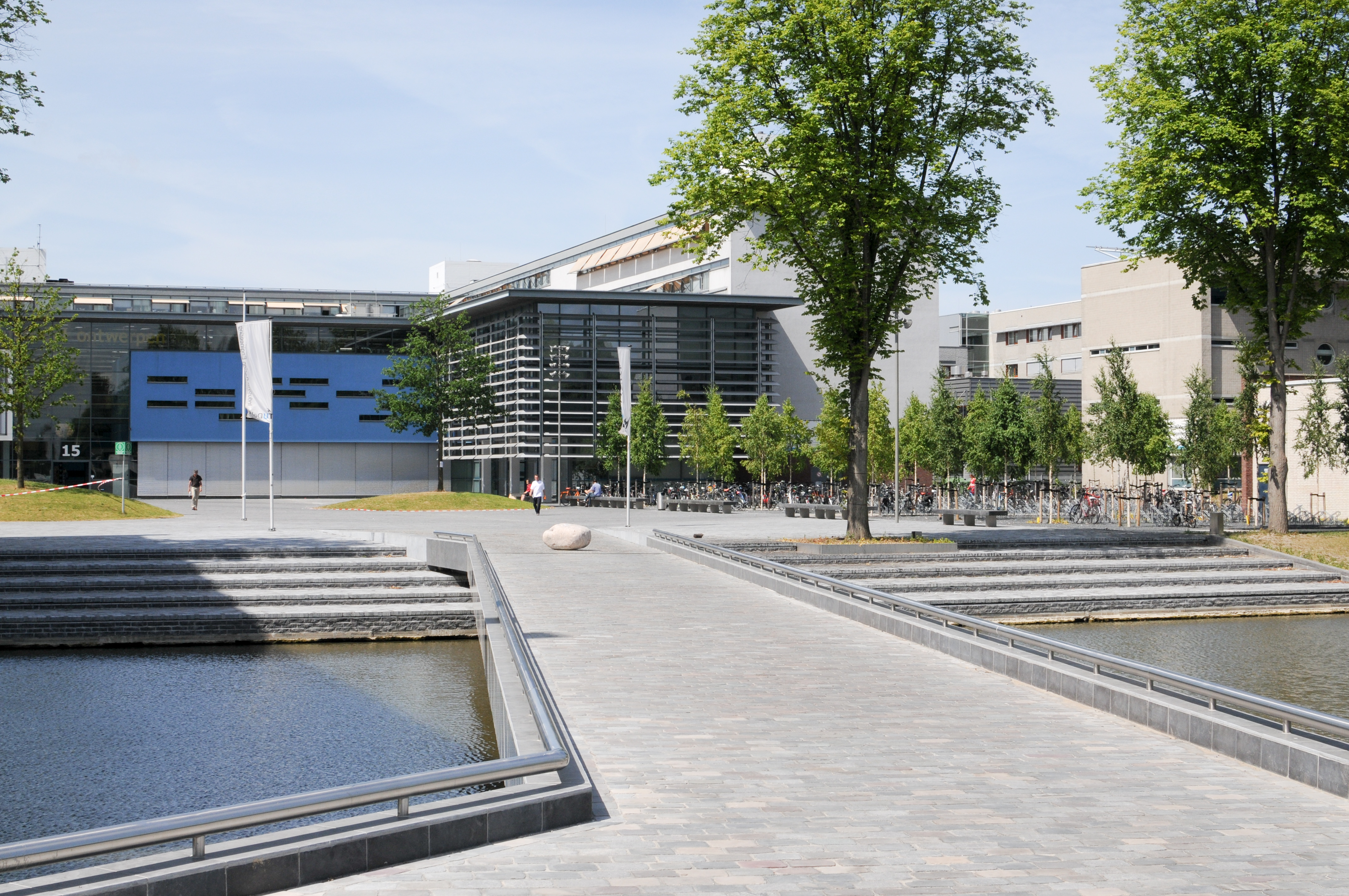
  TU Delft Faculty of Industrial Design Engineering
  - Sustainable Design Engineering
  - Human-Centered Design
  - Design, Organisation and Strategy
- Mechanical Engineering (ME) (Mechanical Engineering (ME); previous name: Werktuigbouwkunde, Maritieme Techniek en Technische Materiaal Wetenschappen (3mE))
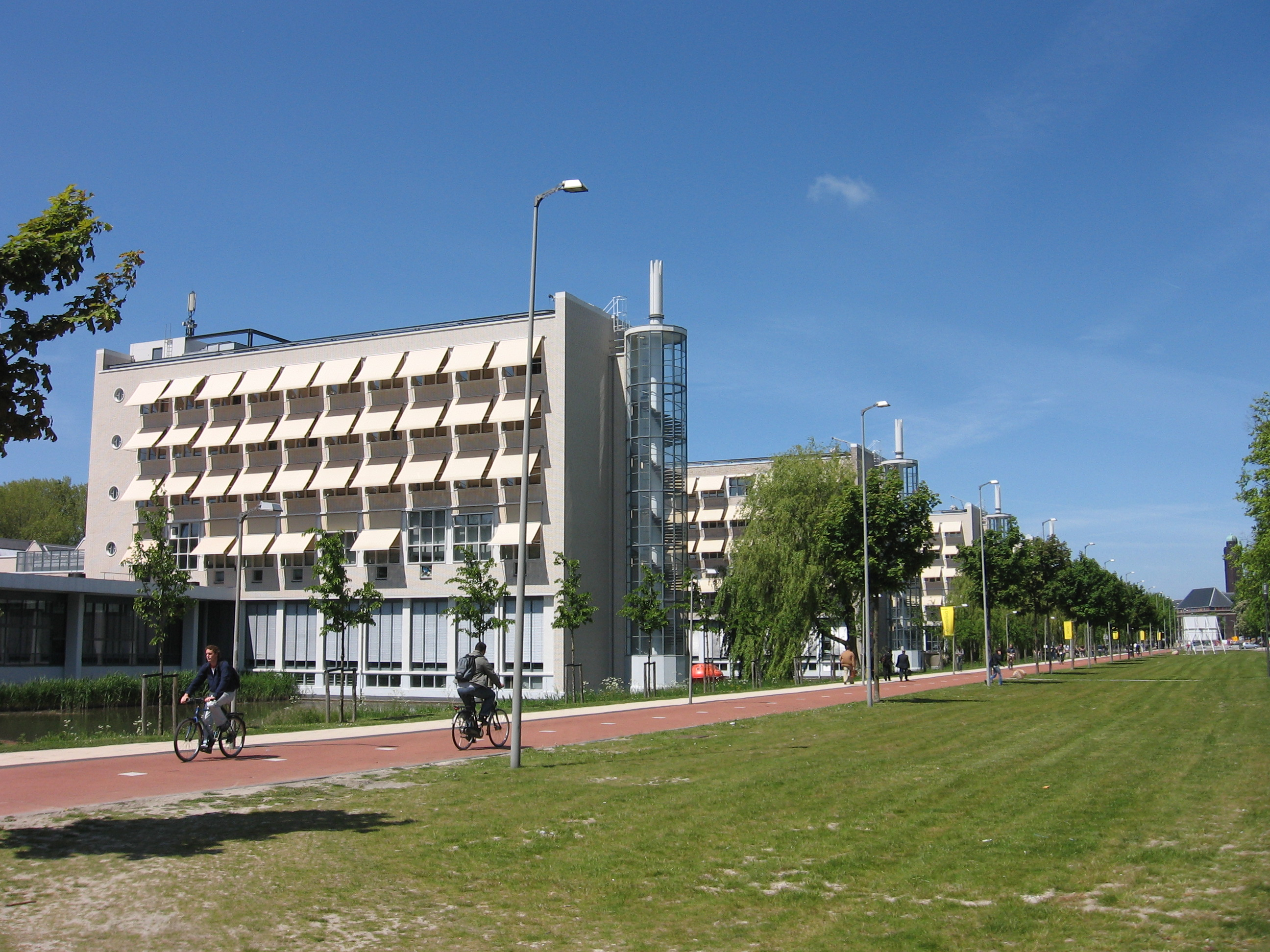
  TU Delft Faculty of Mechanical Engineering
  - Biomechanical Engineering
  - Cognitive Robotics
  - Maritime & Transport Tech
  - Materials Science & Engineering
  - Precision & Microsystems Engineering
  - Process & Energy
  - Systems & Control
- Technology, Policy and Management (TPM) (Techniek, Bestuur en Management (TBM))
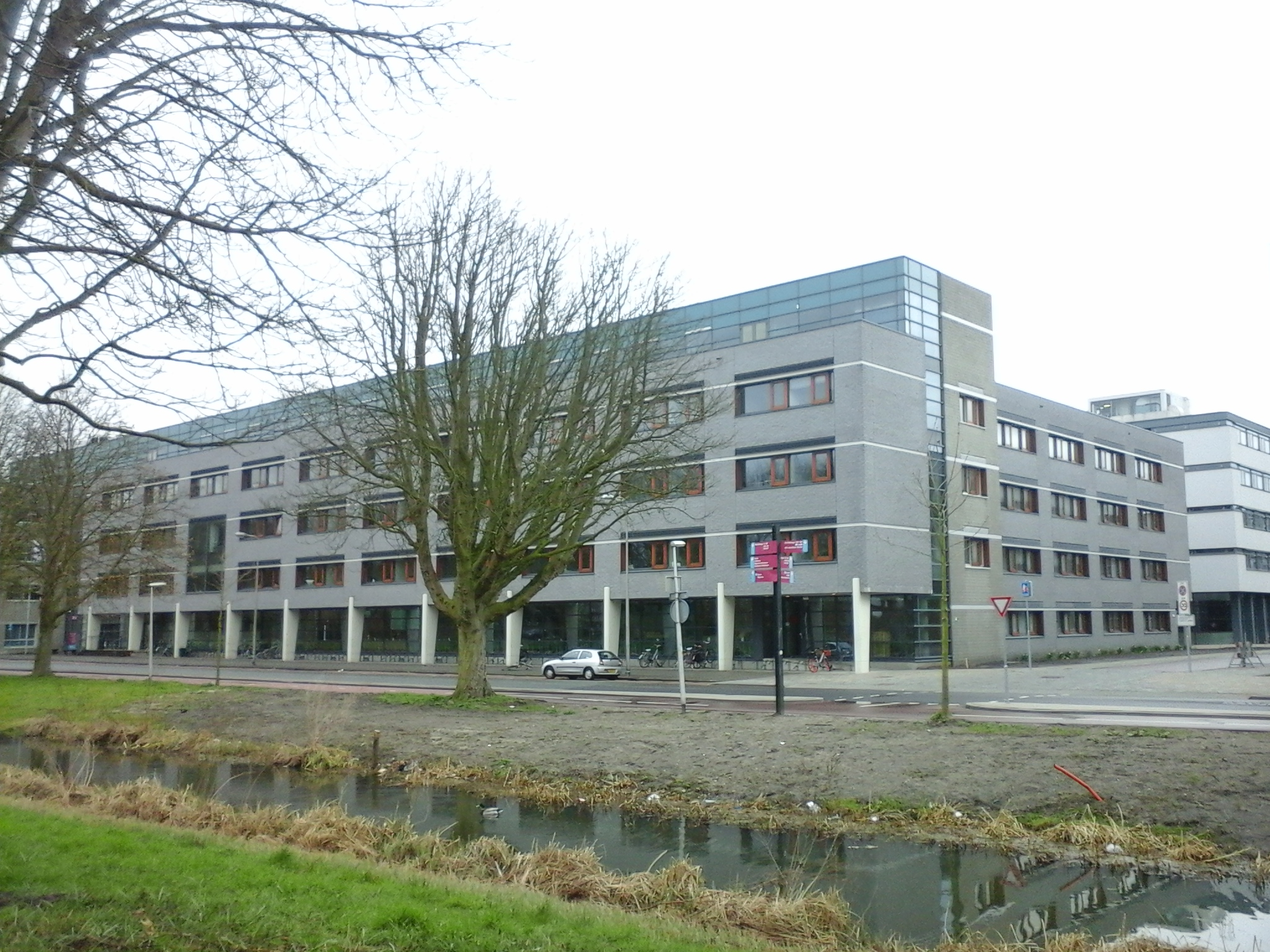
  TU Delft Faculty of Technology, Policy and Management
  - Engineering Systems & Services
  - Multi Actor Systems
  - Values, Technology & Innovation

There are also two Research Institutes:

- QuTech
  - Qubit Research
  - Quantum Computing
  - Quantum Internet
- TU Delft Reactor Institute
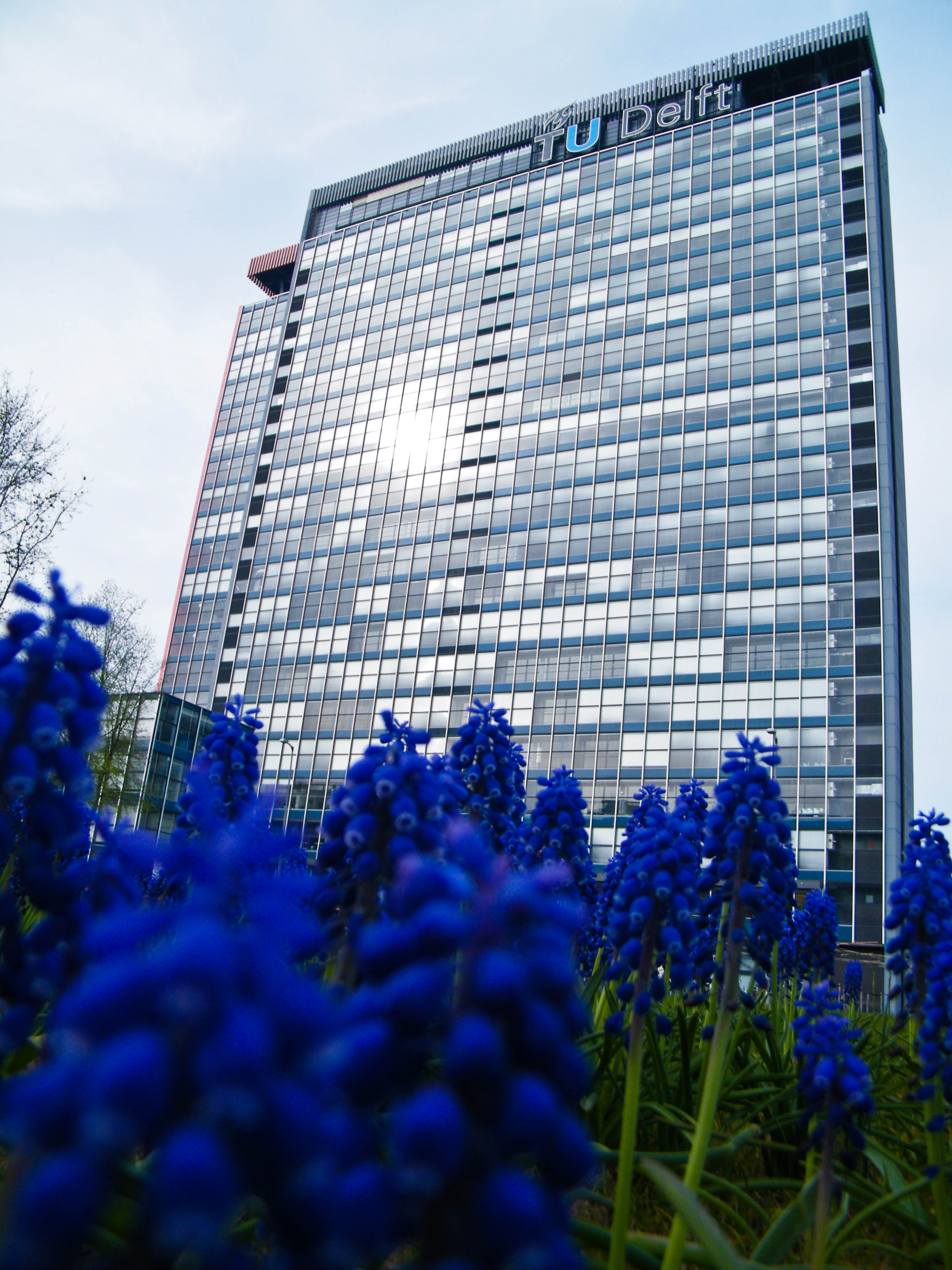
Faculty of Electrical Engineering, Mathematics and Computer Science viewed from the Civil Engineering department

== Education ==
Since 2004, the TU Delft education system is divided into three tiers: the bachelor's degree, master's degree, and doctorate. The academic year is divided into two semesters: the first semester from September until January and the second semester from the end of January until July. Most of the lectures are available through OpenCourseWare.

=== Bachelor-level studies ===
As of 2016, TU Delft offers 16 BSc programmes. TU Delft students obtain their degree after a three-year study. The test project finalizes the BSc studies. All BSc programmes are taught in Dutch, except for Aerospace Engineering, Applied Earth Sciences, Nanobiology, and Computer Science, which are taught entirely in English, and Electrical Engineering which is taught in a mixture of both.

=== Master-level studies ===
TU Delft offers around 40 MSc programmes. The MSc studies take two years to complete.

TU Delft uses the European Credit Transfer System, where each year MSc students are required to obtain 60 ECTS points. An honours track exists for motivated MSc students, who obtained a mark of 7.5 or higher (in Dutch grading scale) and did not fail any courses. This track, associated with 30 ECTS points, is taken alongside the regular MSc programme and must be related to student's regular degree courses or the role of technology in society. The honours track must be completed within the time allowed for the MSc programme.

MSc programmes are also offered through the 3TU federation, Erasmus Mundus programmes, IDEA League joint MSc programs and QuTech Academy.

=== Doctoral-level studies ===
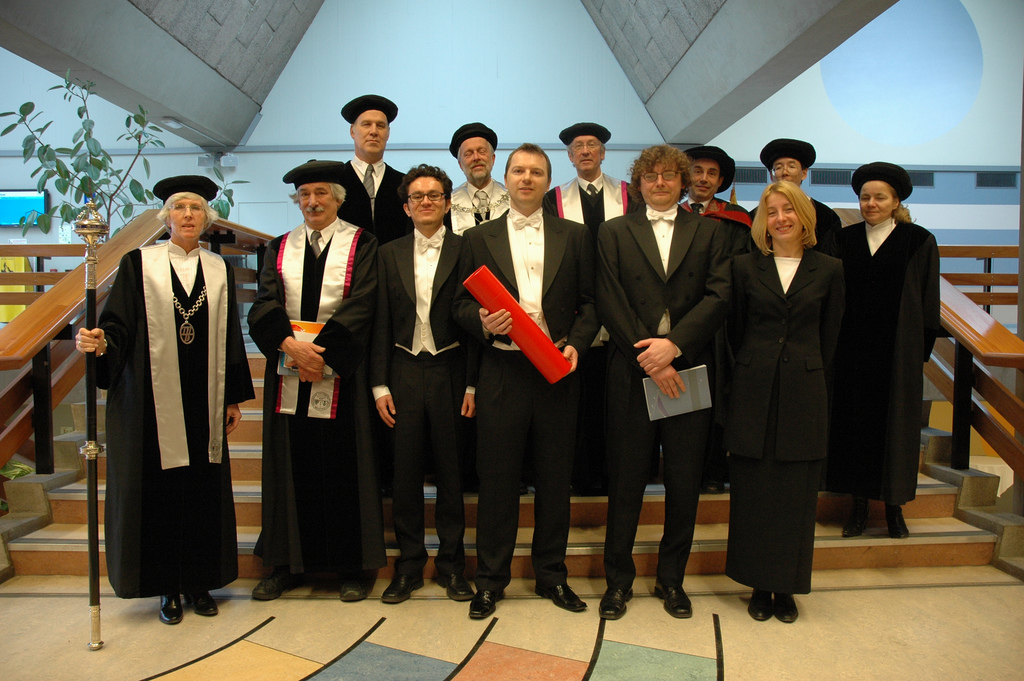
Typical photo following a doctoral defense at Delft University of Technology. The promovendus (center) is accompanied by two paranymphs. The pedel is on the left, holding the staff. The red tube holds the doctoral diploma. The promovendus, as well as the paranymphs, must wear white ties, while all professors in the defense committee wear togas.

Doctoral studies at TU Delft are divided into two phases. The first phase, lasting one year, serves as a trial period during which the doctoral candidate must prove capability for performing research on a doctoral level. The candidate must pass the evaluation performed at the end of the year by his/her promoter in order to continue doing research the following three years. The research the candidate performs must be finalized by submitting a doctoral thesis. The thesis is evaluated by a doctoral committee composed of TU Delft professors and external opponents. Once the thesis has been revised and comments have been taken into account, the candidate gives a formal doctoral defense.

In contrast to US graduate school, other duties such as following lectures and giving TAs form only a small portion of the programme.

==== Doctoral defense ====
The doctoral defense is of ceremonial nature and is held in the senate room. It lasts exactly one hour, during which the doctoral candidate must answer all questions from the committee. Sometimes the candidate is accompanied by one or two paranymphs, who theoretically might help defend a question asked by a committee member. The defense is ended by the pedel, who enters the room and says in Latin Hora est (It is time), stamping the university staff on the floor. The committee then moves to a separate room to decide whether to grant the candidate a doctorate or not. Then the committee returns to the room where the defense was held, and if the doctorate is granted the promoter presents the laudation praising the new doctor. The entire ceremony is chaired by the rector or a representative.

=== Other degree programmes ===
TU Delft also offers Professional Doctorate in Engineering.

== Organization ==
=== Research institutes ===
TU Delft has three officially recognized research institutes: Research Institute for the Built Environment, International Research Centre for Telecommunications-transmission and Radar, and Reactor Institute Delft. In addition to those three institutes, TU Delft hosts numerous smaller research institutes, including the Delft Institute of Microelectronics and Submicron Technology, Kavli Institute of Nanoscience, Materials innovation institute, Astrodynamics and Space Missions, Delft University Wind Energy Research Institute, TU Delft Safety and Security Institute, and the Delft Space Institute, Delft Institute of Applied Mathematics is also an important research institute which connects all engineering departments with respect to research and academia. A complete list of research schools is available on TU Delft website.

=== Research schools ===
Important part of Dutch university system are research schools. They combine education, training and research for PhD candidates and postdoctoral researchers in a given field. The main goal of the research schools is to coordinate nationwide research programs in a given area. Research schools of TU Delft cooperate with other universities in the Netherlands. Research schools are required to have an accreditation of Royal Netherlands Academy of Arts and Sciences. TU Delft is taking the lead in ten research schools, and participates in nine. The full list of research schools affiliated with TU Delft is available on TU Delft website, see for example TRAIL Research School.

=== Media ===
During an academic year the TU Delft publishes a weekly magazine: Delta, which aims at the student and employee community of the university. The newspaper is predominantly in Dutch, with the last few pages published in English. TU Delta is distributed freely in paper form over the campus and is also available for free on the Internet. Articles focus mainly on current university affairs and student life. The weekly agenda including PhD promotions, inaugural lectures, etc. is also published therein.

Also, approximately four times a year, the TU Delft publishes a magazine devoted only to research conducted by the university, called Delft Outlook. Delft Outlook is published in English, while the same content is published in Dutch in Delft Integraal magazine. Both magazines present interviews with TU Delft researchers, university officials. Columns by some university professors are published therein, as well as alumni letters and excerpts from recently published PhD theses.

=== Management ===
TU Delft is governed by the executive board (College van Bestuur), controlled and advised by student council, workers council, board of professors, board of doctorates, assistant staff office, committee for the application of the allocation model, operational committee, advisory council for quality and accreditation, deans of each TU Delft faculty, and directors of TU Delft research centers, research schools and research institutes.

Executive board is chaired academically by the Rector Magnificus. The currently appointed Rector Magnificus, Tim van der Hagen, has held the position since 2018. He replaced Prof. Ir. Karel Ch.A.M. Luyben who was rector for the period 2010 to 2018. Previous Rectors of TU Delft include Prof. K.F. Wakker (1993–1997 and 1998–2002), Prof. J. Blauwendraad (1997–1998) and Prof. J.T. Fokkema (2002–2010). Executive board is accountable to the Supervisory Board, appointed by the Minister of Education, Culture and Science. One of the many tasks of executive board is the approval of management regulations.

Board of professors advises in the matter of academic quality, deciding on the selection of guest lecturers, research fellows as well as revising proposals submitted for royal honors for professors. Board of doctorates appoints supervisors for PhD students, forms promotion committees, determines promotional code, and confers PhD and doctorate Honoris Causa degrees. Committee for the application of the allocation model reports to the executive board regarding allocation model. Further, it controls output data supplied to the executive board. Operational committee is composed of members of the executive board and the s. The committee collaborates on the issues of general importance, related in part to the specific interests of the faculties, and strengthens the unity of the university overall.

== Student life ==
Student life at TU Delft is organized around numerous student societies and corporations. They can be generally categorized into professional societies, social societies and sport societies. More than half of TU Delft students belong to an officially recognized society.

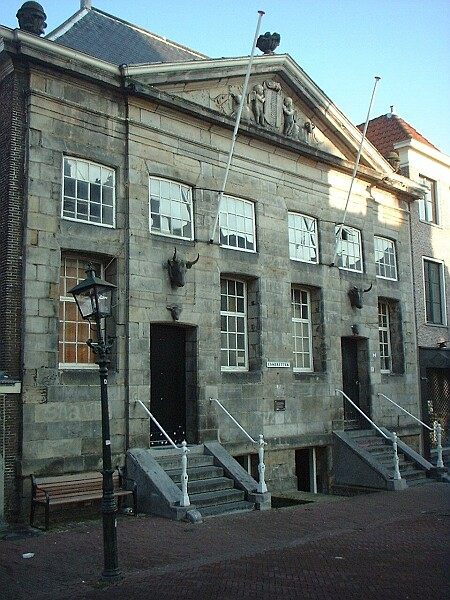
Building of the Koornbeurs Society in the old town of Delft.

There are two student parties at TU Delft: ORAS (Organisatie Rationele Studenten) and Lijst Bèta (successor of AAG). AAG (Afdeling Actie Groepen) started as an action group of students in the 1960s, willing to have more impact on the quality of education at the then Polytechnic Institute Delft. ORAS became active in the early 1970s as a counterbalance to AAG. After already taking a break from the yearly elections in 2008, AAG did not participate anymore in the elections of 2010 due to disappointing results. In 2011, a new party was established, Lijst Bèta, that got 2 out of the 10 seats in the student council. In 2023, Dé Partij made its entry into the Student Council and successfully held 1 out of 10 seats for three years. Following the dissolution of Dé Partij in 2026, Lijst Bèta and ORAS compete each year for seats in TU Delft's Students Council (Studenten Raad). Any student can run for the council, provided they have an active enrolment and gather at least 10 signatures. Further, all student organizations of TU Delft are associated with The Council of Student Societies Delft VeRa (De VerenigingsRaad) and The Society for Study and Student Matters Delft VSSD (Vereniging voor Studie- en Studentenbelangen Delft).

Apart from bachelor and master student organizations, PhD students of TU Delft have their own organization called Promood (PhD Students Discussion Group Delft) (Promovendi Overleg Delft), which represents TU Delft PhD students at the university. It is also a member of Dutch PhD Students Network (Promovendi Netwerk Nederland).

Each faculty of TU Delft has its own set of professional student organizations. Numerous societies are present at the university, many of them with rich traditions, customs and history. For example, aerospace engineering department hosts Foundation for Students in Airplane Development, Manufacturing and Management (Stichting Studenten Vliegtuigontwikkeling, -bouw en -beheer), while civil engineering department Society for Practical Studies. International professional student organizations are also present at TU Delft, including European Association of Aerospace Students.

Apart from professional student societies, students organize themselves only for the purpose of enriching their social life. Many of the societies have sectarian roots, like a Catholic Wolbodo Student Society, Katholieke Studentenvereniging Sanctus Virgilius, that during the course of the years lost the religious affiliations and accepts students from any denomination. Besides societies which have their roots in religion, there are also general (with no religious bonds) societies. One of these is Sint Jansbrug. These societies accept anyone who studies at the TU Delft or any other higher education facility in the Delft area. Also organization that has its roots in Rover Scout movement Delftsche Zwervers (at the same time the oldest student scouting group in the world) is present or local branch of the European AEGEE.

Student sports are organized around clubs, that focus mostly on single discipline. Those include rowing society D.S.R.V. Laga and rowing club Proteus-Eretes (both with many Olympic medals won by the members of the club) or American football club Delft Dragons.

== Research ==
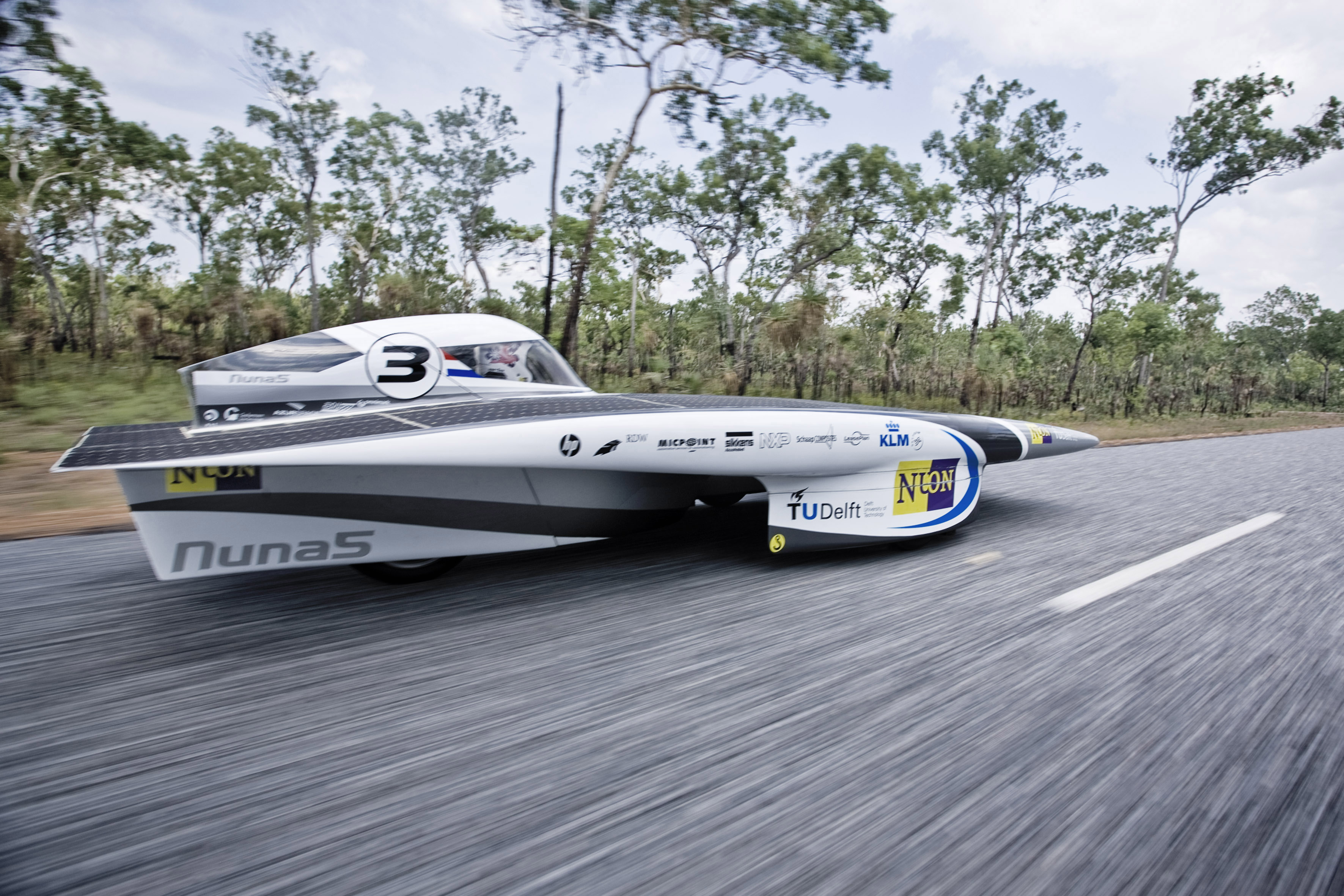
Nuna 5, from a series of Nuna solar-powered cars that won the World Solar Challenge seven times, constructed by the students of TU Delft.

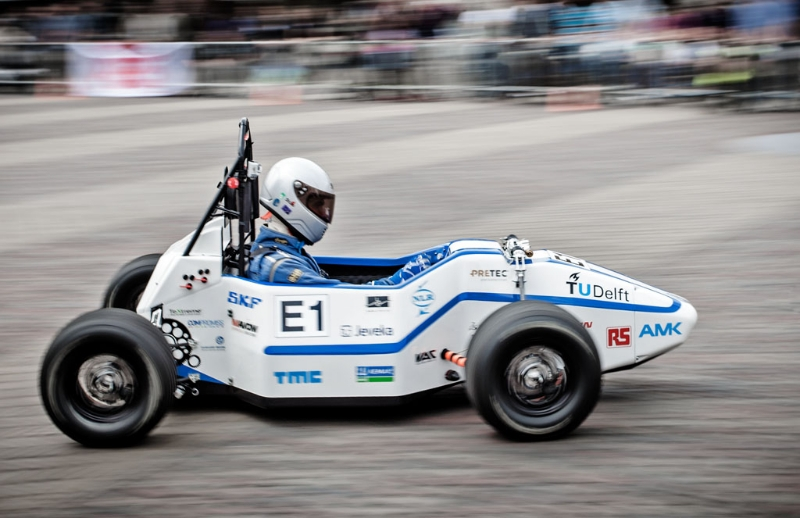
DUT12, the twelfth car of the Formula Student team Delft (DUT Racing). Held the Guinness World Record for fastest accelerating electric vehicle in the world.

TU Delft researchers developed many new technologies used today, including GLARE, a fibre metal laminate used in Airbus A380 skin and Vision in Product Design design method. Cees Dekker's lab at TU Delft demonstrated in 1998 the first transistor made out of single nanotube molecule. The Delta Works plan was, in part, a child of TU Delft graduates, including Johan Ringers and Victor de Blocq van Kuffeler. TU Delft was a precursor of the Open design concept.

In architecture, TU Delft is famous for Traditionalist School in Dutch architecture. TU Delft was a home to many prominent microbiologists including Martinus Beijerinck, who in 1898 discovered viruses while working at TU Delft, and Albert Kluyver, father of comparative microbiology, which resulted in the creation of so-called Delft School of Microbiology.

Some recent projects being developed at the university include:

=== Vehicles ===
- Superbus, project aiming to design a high speed bus reaching top speeds of 250 km/h;
- Nuna, solar-powered race car and six times winner of the World Solar Challenge;
- TU Delft Solar Boat Team, solar-powered boat that 'flies' using hydrofoils;
- TU Delft Hydro Motion Team, a project building hydrogen-powered boat that 'flies' using hydrofoils;
- DUT Racing, electrical Formula Student project having won multiple competitions and at one point held the Guinness World Record for fastest accelerating electric vehicle;
- Project MARCH, a student team building an exoskeleton for paraplegics and participating as the first Dutch exoskeleton team at the Cybathlon.
- DelFly, Micro air vehicle and the smallest ornithopter so far fitted with a camera;
- Nova Electric Racing, electric motorcycle team and winner of MotoE 2017;
- Fhybrid, world's first hydrogen-powered scooter;
- Forze, hydrogen fuel cell-powered racing car;
- Eco-Runner, previously a hydrogen vehicle participating in the Shell Eco-marathon. Now making a car that can run on multiple fuels;
- Albatross, an eVTOL aircraft that can take off and land vertically from a parking space.

=== Other ===
- Flame, first humanoid robot able to walk as a human;
- Somnox Sleep Robot an automatically-breathing capsule-shaped robot starting prototyping in 2015.
- Kitepower, converting wind energy into electricity using kites;
- Tribler, an open source peer-to-peer client with online TV functions;
- Nix and NixOS, an open source functional programming package manager and a Linux distribution based on it;
- Delfi-C3, CubeSat satellite built by TU Delft students, and Delfi-n3Xt launched 21 October 2013;
- Stratos II+, a sounding rocket developed by Delft Aerospace Rocket Engineering which in October 2015, broke the European altitude record achieved by amateur rockets by reaching an altitude of 21,457 meters;
- Glaciogenic Reservoir Analogue Studies Project (GRASP);
- The Ocean Cleanup, a project to develop means to clean up ocean garbage patches;
- iGEM TU Delft, a student team competing in the largest international student competition in synthetic biology, where they won Grand Prize in 2015 and 2017;
- Quantum computing, topological insulators and applications.
- Emergence, a student team combining art and technology in order to create artworks that serve as a form of science communication.
- CORE (Constructing Resilience), a studet team focussed on designing and building resilience for communities experiencing climate change and natural disasters.

== People ==
=== Students ===
The majority of TU Delft's students are male. In 2021, among all students of the university (MSc and BSc level) 30% were women. The biggest imbalance between men and women is seen in the Mechanical engineering faculty, while the smallest is seen at Industrial Design and Architecture departments. Despite many efforts of the university to change that imbalance, the number of women studying at TU Delft has stayed relatively constant over the years.

TU Delft student body demographics
	2009	2022
PhD Students (total)	2,027	3,144
PhD Students (men)	1,474	2,135
PhD Students (women)	547	1,007
MSc and BSc students (total)	16,427	26,658
MSc and BSc students (foreign)	2,236	6,821
MSc and BSc students (women)	3,351	8,248
BSc students (total)	10,857	13,782
MSc students (total)	5,524	12,876
Student Population	18,454	27,080

Since 2002, the number of students admitted to TU Delft has increased rapidly (from approximately 2,200 in 2002 to almost 3,700 in 2009). The same applies to the total student population (from approximately 13,250 in 2002 to almost 16,500 in 2009). In 2022, nearly 27 thousand students were enrolled.

The number of international students has also increased steadily. In 2021, 29% of all students at TU Delft came from abroad; nearly three quarters of those came from Europe. The largest proportion of international students at TU Delft in 2022 come from China (14%), followed by India (11.4%) and Belgium (7.4%). The faculties with the highest percentage number of international students study at Aerospace Engineering (46%) and Electrical Engineering, Mathematics, and Computer Science (38%).

Due to TU Delft's presence, the city of Delft has one of the biggest populations of Iranians in the Netherlands. It resulted in one of the biggest Iranian protests against the Iranian government in Europe, with many protests organized at TU Delft campus by Iranian TU Delft students during 2009 Iranian Election Protests.

=== Faculty ===
As of 2015, TU Delft is a home to 437 faculty, with more than 3,375 academic staff. The responsibility of TU Delft professors is lecturing, guiding undergraduate and graduate students, as well as performing original research in their respective fields.

Many notable people were TU Delft faculty. In science, Heike Kamerlingh Onnes, a 1913 Nobel Laureate in physics, a discoverer of superconductivity, was a former TU Delft faculty member, working as an assistant to Johannes Bosscha. Discoverer of the Prins reaction Hendrik Jacobus Prins, co-founders of National Research Institute for Mathematics and Computer Science Hendrik Anthony Kramers and David van Dantzig, developer of the iodide process Jan Hendrik de Boer, discoverer of the particle spin Ralph Kronig, discoverer of the Einstein–de Haas effect Wander Johannes de Haas and discoverer of hafnium Dirk Coster, all were at some point the faculty members of the university. Faculty members of Delft School of Microbiology were the founder of modern microbiology Martinus Beijerinck and the father of comparative microbiology Albert Kluyver.

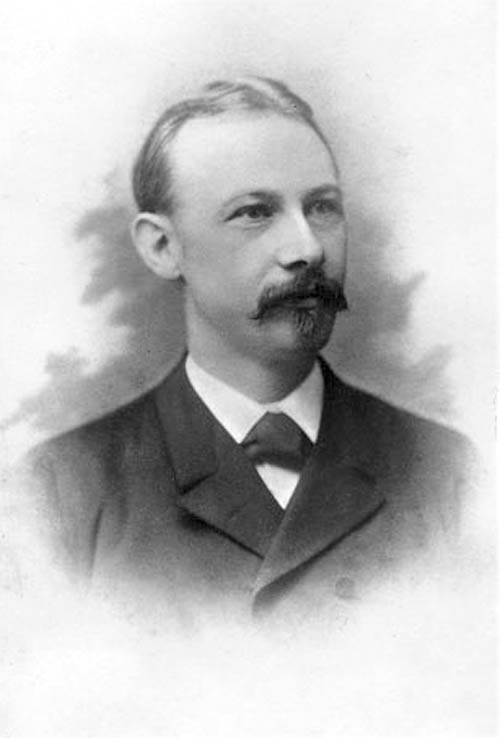
Heike Kamerlingh Onnes,
discoverer of superconductivity, TU Delft faculty 1878-1882

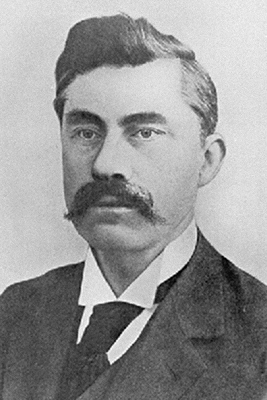
Martinus Beijerinck,
father of virology, TU Delft faculty 1895-1921

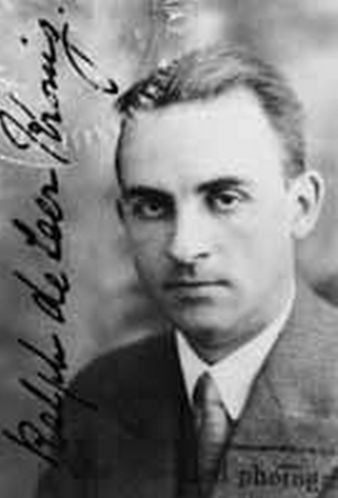
Ralph Kronig,
discoverer of particle spin, TU Delft faculty 1939-1969

In engineering, the inventor of penthode and gyrator Bernard Tellegen and Balthasar van der Pol developer of Van der Pol oscillator, were TU Delft faculty. Currently Vic Hayes, and the father of Wi-Fi, is affiliated with the Faculty of Technology, Policy and Management. STS-61A of the Space Shuttle Challenger crew member Wubbo Ockels was professor of Faculty of Aerospace Engineering, Delft University of Technology. TU Delft faculty geologist were Berend George Escher, Johannes Herman Frederik Umbgrove, discoverer of Bushveld complex Gustaaf Adolf Frederik Molengraaff and discoverer of gravity anomalies above the sea level Felix Andries Vening Meinesz.

Since TU Delft is a home to a major architecture school in the Netherlands, many important architects were a faculty of the university, including Hein de Haan, founder of Traditionalist School in Architecture Marinus Jan Granpré Molière, Bent Flyvbjerg, co-founder of Mecanoo architects bureau Francine Houben, co-founder of MVRDV architects bureau Winy Maas and Nathalie de Vries, co-founder of Team 10 Jacob B. Bakema and Aldo van Eyck, as well as Herman Hertzberger and Jo Coenen. Some notable designers were faculty of TU Delft, including Paul Mijksenaar, developer of visual information systems for JFK, LaGuardia and Schiphol airports.

Political figures that were faculty of TU Delft include former mayor of Lisbon Carmona Rodrigues, former mayor of Sarajevo Kemal Hanjalić, and the first Dutch prime minister of the Netherlands after World War II Wim Schermerhorn.

=== Notable alumni ===
Two TU Delft alumni were awarded Nobel Prize and one recipient has been affiliated with TU Delft: Jacobus van 't Hoff was awarded first Nobel Prize in Chemistry in 1901 for his work with solutions. Simon van der Meer was awarded Nobel Prize in physics in 1984 for his work on stochastic cooling and one has been affiliated with TU Delft, Heike Kamerlingh Onnes in 1913 for studies related to liquefaction of helium in the quest for the lowest temperature on Earth.

Some of the mathematicians include Jan Arnoldus Schouten, contributor to the tensor calculus. Chemists and TU Delft alumni include Willem Alberda van Ekenstein, Dutch chemist and discoverer of Lobry-de Bruyn-van Ekenstein transformation. TU Delft alumni and computer scientists include Adriaan van Wijngaarden, developer of Van Wijngaarden grammar and co-designer of ALGOL. Famous TU Delft alumni electrical engineers include Jaap Haartsen, developer of Bluetooth.

Political figures that studied at TU Delft include Karien van Gennip, Dutch secretary of state for economic affairs, Anton Mussert, Dutch politician of World War II era and founder of National Socialist Movement in the Netherlands, Abdul Qadeer Khan, father of Pakistan nuclear program, and Dutch politician Wim Dik. Famous TU Delft alumni architects include Erick van Egeraat, Herman Hertzberger and Hein de Haan. Dutch designers that graduated at TU Delft include Alexandre Horowitz, designer of Philishave, and Adrian van Hooydonk, Dutch automobile designer and head of design at BMW.

TU Delft alumni executives include Jeroen van der Veer, former CEO of Royal Dutch Shell, Ben van Beurden former CEO of Royal Dutch Shell, Frits Philips, fourth chairman of the board of directors of Philips and Gerard Philips, co-founder of Philips. Laurens van den Acker is a Dutch automobile designer and the vice president of Renault Corporate Design.

Other interesting TU Delft alumni include Lodewijk van den Berg, Dutch-American payload specialist on STS-51B mission and Prince Friso of Orange-Nassau, member of the Dutch royal family. Other interesting figures that studied at TU Delft were mathematician Diederik Korteweg, responsible for Korteweg–de Vries equation, who studied at TU Delft before moving to University of Amsterdam and painter Maurits Cornelis Escher who studied at TU Delft for a year. Thomas Jan Stieltjes, co-developer of Riemann–Stieltjes integral studied at TU Delft but never passed his final exams. The internationally renowned graphic designer and industrial designer Piet Zwart studied at the university 1913–1914.

TU Delft alumni who are currently a faculty of other universities include Wilhelmus Luxemburg, Dutch mathematician and California Institute of Technology professor, as well as Walter Lewin, Dutch physicist and former MIT professor, and Alexander van Oudenaarden, Dutch biophysicist, a director of the Hubrecht Institute.

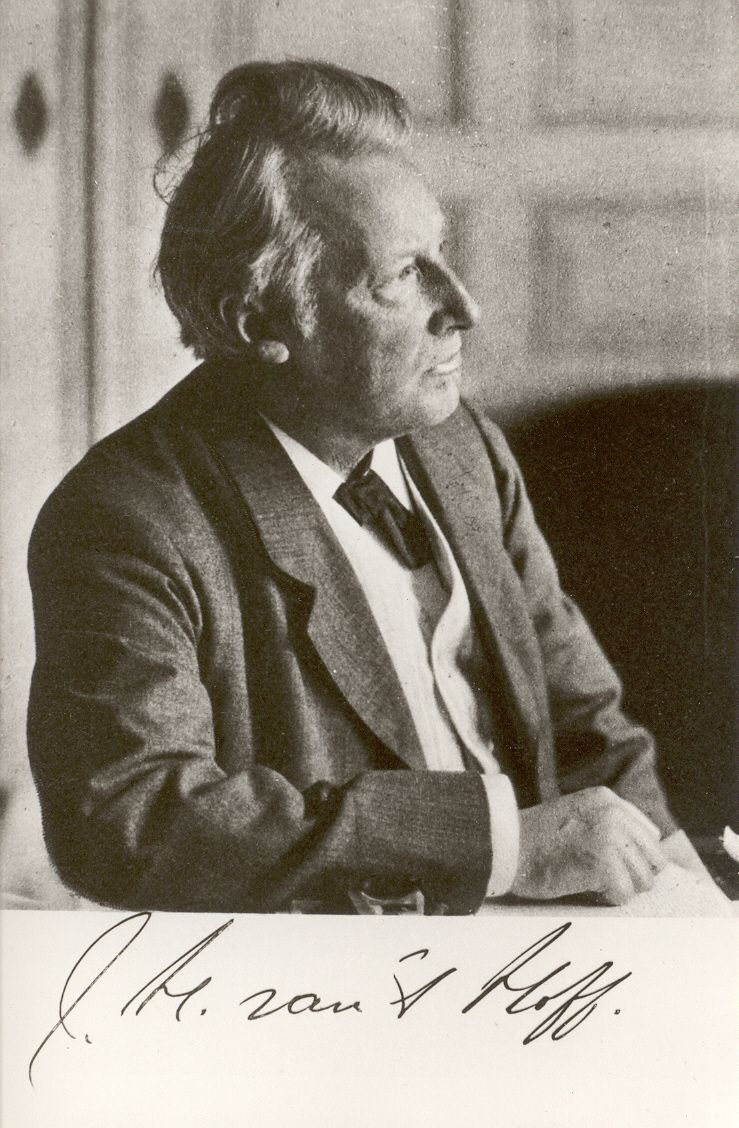
Jacobus van 't Hoff,
Nobel Prize in chemistry, TU Delft student 1869-1871

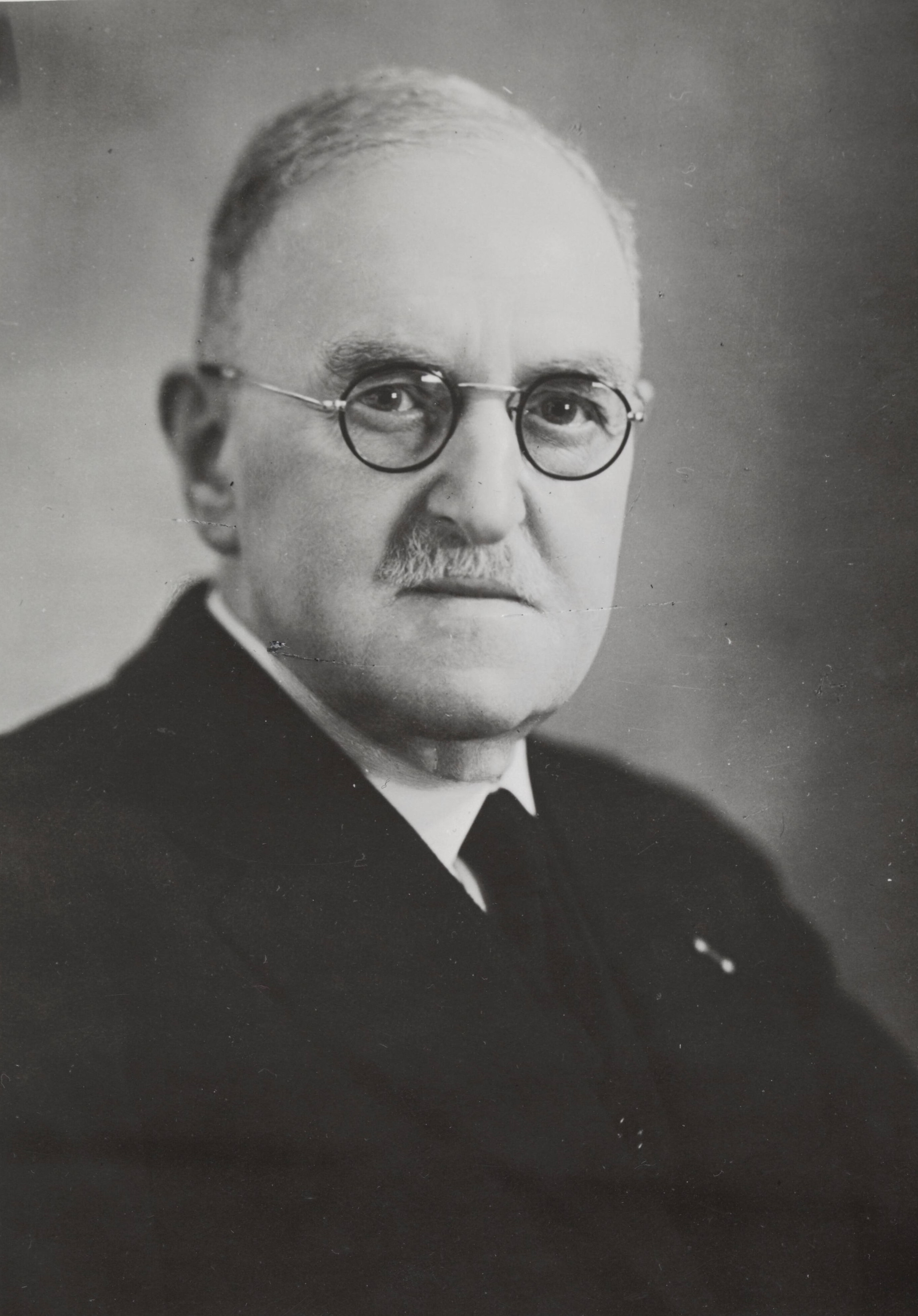
Gerard Philips,
cofounder of Philips, TU Delft student 1876-1883

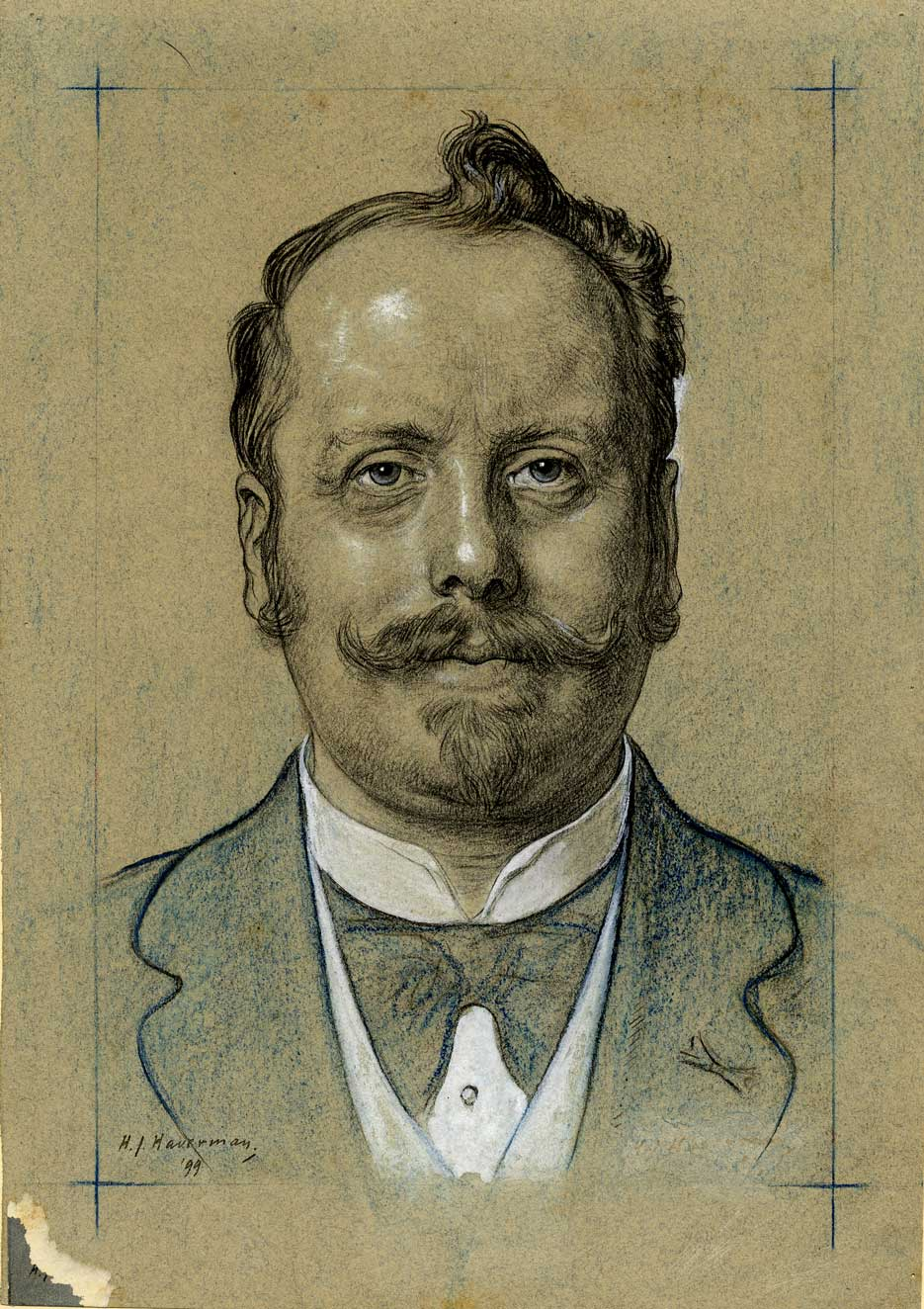
Cornelis Lely,
head designer of Afsluitdijk, TU Delft student 1871-1875

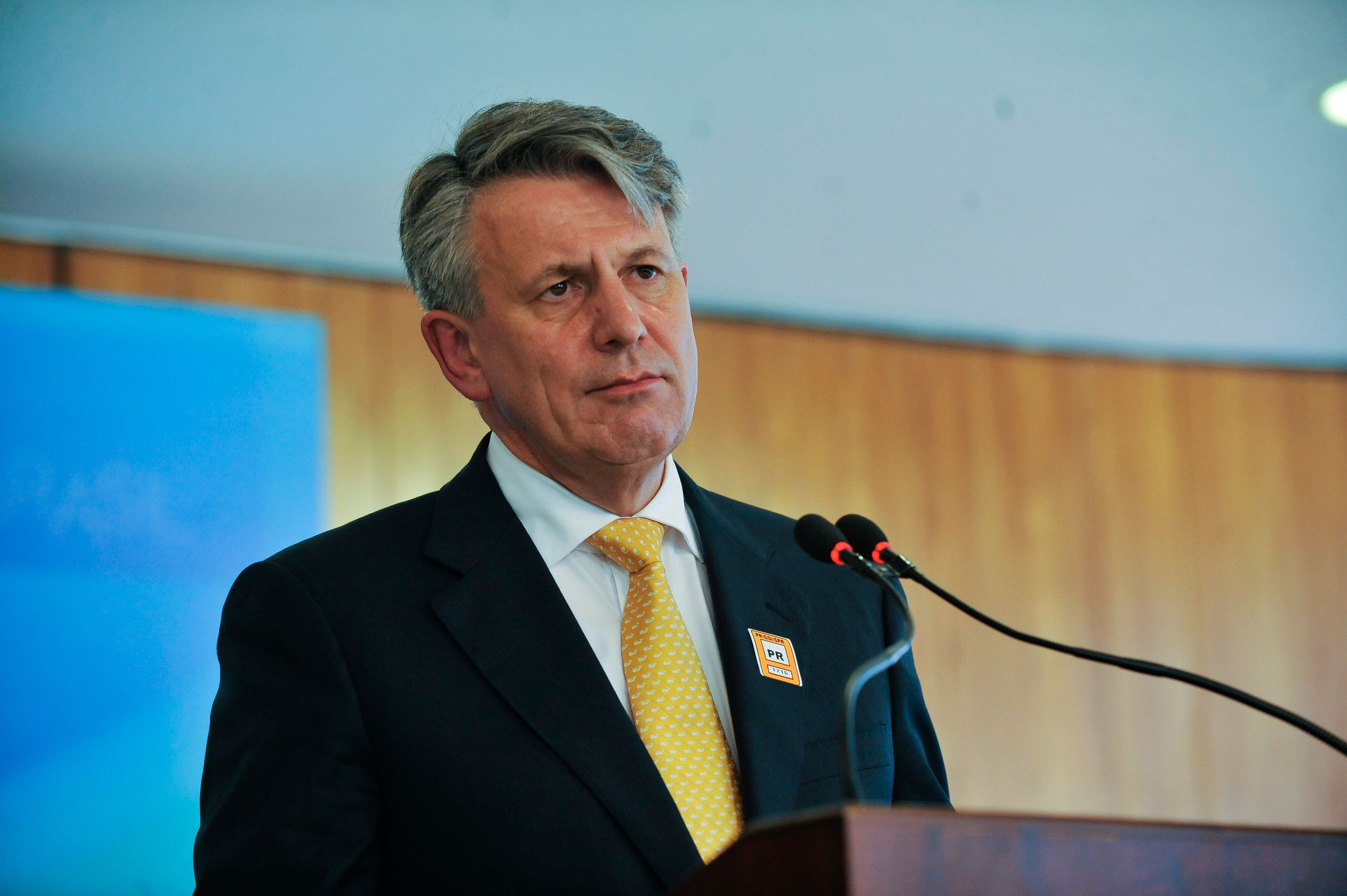
Ben van Beurden former CEO of Royal Dutch Shell, TU Delft student 1981-1983

==== Honoris Causa Laureates ====
In 1906 TU Delft obtained the right to award PhD degrees. This also marked the date since when the university was able to award honorary doctorates. Between 1906 and 2006 exactly 100 honoris causa degrees have been awarded. Honorary doctoral degrees are awarded to people that presented extraordinary contributions in their respective fields. Some of the most recognized recipients of TU Delft honorary doctorate include:

- Gerard Philips (1917), co-founder of Philips corporation,
- Hendrik Antoon Lorentz (1918), winner of the Nobel Prize in Physics known for work on electromagnetic radiation,
- Prince Bernhard (1951), prince of the Netherlands,
- John Douglas Cockcroft (1959), winner of Nobel Prize in Physics for work on atom splitting,
- Santiago Calatrava (1997) architect.

== Reputation and ranking ==
University rankings

Global – Overall
- ARWU World: 151–200 (2024)
- CWUR World: 263 (2023)
- CWTS World: 109 (2023)
- QS World: 49 (2025)
- Reuters World: 60 (2019)
- THE World: =56 (2025)
- USNWR Global: =187 (2025)

Global – Science and engineering
- QS Chemistry: 36 (2024)
- QS Engineering & Tech.: 13 (2024)
- QS Natural Sciences: 47 (2024)
- THE Computer Science: 45 (2024)
- THE Engineering: 16 (2024)
- THE Physical Sciences: 61 (2024)

=== Overall rankings ===
TU Delft was 49th worldwide in QS WUR 2025, 48th worldwide in THE WUR 2024, 169th worldwide in USNEWS 2022-2023, and 151-200th worldwide in ARWU 2022. It was the 78th best-ranked university worldwide in 2022 in terms of aggregate performance across THE, QS, and ARWU, as reported by ARTU.

TU Delft was 43rd worldwide in the THE World Reputation Rankings 2022.

It was also the 15th most international university worldwide in 2023 according to THE.

=== Subject/area rankings ===
TU Delft is ranked a top university for engineering and technology worldwide, being positioned for this subject at 13th place in 2024 by QS World University Rankings.

According to the QS World University Rankings 2024, TU Delft ranked 3rd worldwide for architecture, 3rd for mechanical and aerospace engineering, 3rd for civil and structural engineering, 11th for chemical engineering, 12th for design, 13th for environmental sciences, 14th for electric and electronical engineering, 14th for material sciences, 19th for geophysics, 22nd for earth and marine sciences.

== Affiliations and partner universities ==
TU Delft has formed partnerships with leading universities across Europe for student exchange and combined degree programs.

- IDEA League: strategic alliance between TU Delft, ETH Zurich, RWTH Aachen, Chalmers University and Politecnico di Milano.
- CESAER: non-profit institution of leading universities in Europe
- EUA: forum of universities for cooperation and exchange in higher education
- Leiden-Delft-Erasmus alliance: a strategic alliance between Leiden University, TU Delft, and Erasmus University Rotterdam in the areas of education, research and valorisation
- 4TU: federation of four leading Dutch technical universities TU Delft, TU Eindhoven, Wageningen University and University of Twente
- UNITECH International: non-profit organization aiming to prepare Engineers for their professional future through exchange
- SEFI: leading organization for providing information exchange in Europe
- SAE: network of eight Dutch universities that supports universities cultural collections and heritage
- ATHENS: network of European universities supporting one week exchange sessions
- PEGASUS: network of European Aeronautical universities
- ENHANCE Alliance: network of European Technical universities; TU Delft, Chalmers University of Technology, ETH Zurich, Gdańsk University of Technology, Norwegian University of Science and Technology, Polytechnic University of Milan, Rheinisch-Westfälische Technische Hochschule Aachen, Technische Universität Berlin, Universitat Politècnica de València, Politechnika Warszawska.

TU Delft has partnered with many universities worldwide for exchanges.

== See also ==
- Ampelmann system
- RoboValley
