= TRAIL Research School =

National research university in the Netherlands

The TRAIL Research School is the Netherlands’ national (university) research school active in the fields of Transport, Infrastructure, and Logistics.

TRAIL provides education at Ph.D.-candidate level, initiates and conducts scientific and applied scientific research and organises activities for knowledge transfer and exchange.

== Participants ==
Within TRAIL, Erasmus University of Rotterdam, Delft University of Technology, the University of Groningen, Eindhoven University of Technology, University of Twente and Radboud University Nijmegen collaborate.

Scientists and researchers of twelve faculties and institutes (spanning the fields of economics, technology, policy and management, and the social and behavioural sciences) form a concentration of experts in the fields of traffic and transport. Over 220 researchers, of whom 157 are PhD candidates, are active in TRAIL (2026).

== Research programs ==
TRAIL initiates and participates in research programs, collaborative research arrangements with public and private parties, and other collaborative initiatives that aim to conduct (applied) scientific research and to bring research findings to concrete use and applications.

== Accreditation ==
TRAIL was initiated in 1994; since 1997, TRAIL has been officially accredited by the Royal Netherlands Academy of Arts and Sciences as a formal Research School.
