= Somnox Sleep Robot =

Sleep-enhancement device

- Manufacturer: Somnox
- Country: Netherlands
- Year of creation: 2017
- Price: US$600 (2024)
- Website: somnox.com

The Somnox Sleep Robot is a capsule-shaped robot that claims to enhance quality of sleep. The capsule "breathes" in and out according to a fixed rhythm. The company claims that by subconsciously matching their breathing to it, people will be helped to fall asleep.

== Description ==
The robot is a heavy, kidney-shaped white capsule with a soft fabric shell. It can be controlled with a smartphone through a companion app. In addition to breathing, it also plays customizable audio.

== History ==
The robot began prototyping in 2015 at the Delft University of Technology in the Netherlands. It was originally made by four robotics engineers there to help themselves and their families fall asleep, and to help wean one of the designer's mothers suffering from anxiety and insomnia off of sleep medication. The decision was made to commercialize it after it received interest from strangers. It was released on Kickstarter in November 2017, raising about twice its funding goal of €100,000 (US$123,000).

Somnox launched a second version of their product line in November 2021, with WiFi and Bluetooth support as well as an improved spirometry algorithm.

== See also ==
- Sleep disorder
- Sleep hygiene
- White noise machine
