= RoboValley =

Dutch centre for robotics

- Founded: 2015; 11 years ago
- Founder: Martijn Wisse & Arie van den Ende
- Headquarters: Delft, Netherlands
- Area served: Worldwide
- Website: RoboValley.com

RoboValley is a centre for robotics, headquartered in Delft, Netherlands. RoboValley is powered by the Robotics Institute of Delft University of Technology. RoboValley aims to facilitate collaboration between researchers, governments and enterprises. Currently, RoboValley is looking to attract robotics companies and researchers in the field of robotics in order to facilitate this collaboration. Among others, TU Delft's Robotics Student Association is located in the centre.

The idea of RoboValley came from professor Martijn Wisse's vision of creating a Silicon Valley for robotics, which is how the name RoboValley came to be. Martijn Wisse soon presented his idea to Arie van den Ende, an entrepreneur and business developer.

Over the course of 2015, RoboValley continued its development, starting with the creation of the Robo Service Centre, a virtual office for start-up robotics companies and a shared service centre for all robotics activities in RoboValley. In September 2015, a delegation of RoboValley travelled to RoboBusiness in San Jose, California to officially present RoboValley to a worldwide audience.

On 31 May 2016, RoboValley and Chrysalix Venture Capital announced the launch of the RoboValley Investment Fund, raising 100 million Euro. The RoboValley Fund is intended to identify, invest in and commercialize new robotics technologies.
