= Stichting Academisch Erfgoed =

The Stichting Academisch Erfgoed (SAE), in English the Dutch Foundation for Academic Heritage, is a network of Dutch universities that supports these universities' heritage and cultural collections.

== Mission ==
The Dutch Foundation for Academic Heritage helps to protect university heritage, to make it more accessible and known to the public.

== History ==
The SAE was founded in 1997, when Dutch State Secretary Aad Nuis reserved a subsidy of 12 million guilders via the Mondriaan Stichting. At that point, a plan was developed for future maintenance and management of the universities' collections. The SAE then made a first selection of valuable and save-worthy collections and objects, developed first guidelines to use these collections in education and research, and to make them better available for the broad public.

The SAE has initiated various thematic projects, about botanical, medical and geological collections. In 2012, the SAE also launched a shared collection website for academic heritage.

== Members ==
- Universiteit van Amsterdam
- Delft University of Technology
- Eindhoven University of Technology
- University of Groningen
- Leiden University
- Maastricht University
- Radboud University Nijmegen
- Free University of Amsterdam
- Utrecht University
- Wageningen UR

Museum Boerhaave participates as an associate member.
