= Saint Hippolytus Chapel, Delft =

Saint Hippolytus Chapel
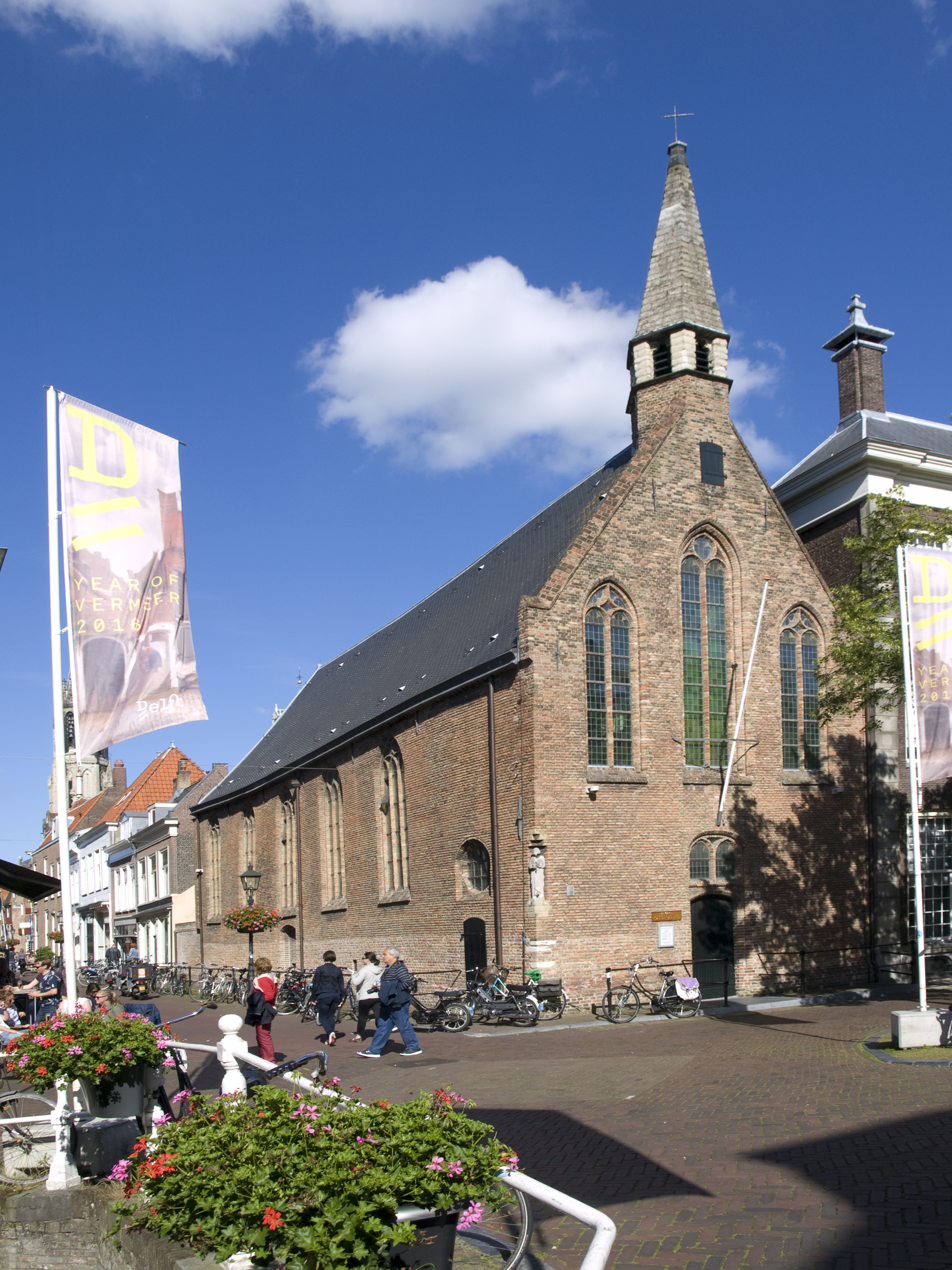

Location
- Location: Delft, Netherlands
- Interactive map of Saint Hippolytus Chapel
- Coordinates: 52.011209°N 4.356608°E

Architecture
- Style: Gothic
- Completed: circa 1400
- Designated as NHL: Dutch rijksmonument #12090

The Saint Hippolytus Chapel (Dutch: Sint-Hippolytuskapel) is a chapel in the Dutch city of Delft. It is one of its oldest buildings, and since 1967 it has been designated as a rijksmonument.

The church was built around 1400 in the Gothic style and is located on the east side of the Oude Delft. Until the Reformation, the Oude Kerk was consecrated to Saint Hippolytus, and the name of the chapel comes from the city quarter. At the time of foundation, it was a part of the already existent female religious community, similar to a monastery: Holy Spirit Sisters House (Dutch: Heilige Geestzusterhuis). It was built on the foundations of the older chapel and was consecrated in 1412. In 1536, it was badly damaged by a fire and subsequently restored. In 1572, during the Reformation, the interior of the chapel was emptied, and the clock and the cross were taken from the tower. After 1581, it was used as a depot, but a part of the chapel was still used for service by Protestants.

In 1910, the chapel was restored, and the design of the facade was altered, making it look more like the original design. Since 1924 and until the construction of the new campus of Delft University of Technology in 1966, the doctorate ceremonies of the university were held in the chapel. In 1972, it was transferred to the Roman Catholic Church and since 30 July 1972 is used for service.
