= Flame (robot) =

Name of a roughly human-shaped robot

Flame is the name of a roughly human-shaped robot, developed in the Netherlands by Daan Hobbelen of the Mechanical Engineering department of Delft University. Robot motion is more easily done with wheels, but this robot was designed specifically to study human walking. It is 130 cm tall and weights 15 kg.

Flame is a continuation of Denise, another walking robot developed at Delft University, which featured in a Science article in 2005. Just like Denise, Flame walks through controlled falling. It does not try to keep balance, but accepts that it loses balance and reacts to that by placing a foot such that it will stop the fall. Do this continuously, and the result is walking. The idea is that humans walk in the same manner.

Flame uses just a little more energy than a human of the same weight. It turned out Flame walked most efficiently if the 'rear heel' is lifted the moment the 'front heel' hits the ground. Humans do the same.

Flame works differently from Japanese robots, which are generally based on assembly line robots and know exactly what to do when because the environment is fixed. For example, they can walk up stairs quite impressively, but only the set of stairs that they have been programmed for. According to Hobbelen this approach is a dead end. Flame is more flexible and reacts to changing circumstances.
