= IDEA League =

European technical university alliance

IDEA League

The IDEA League is an alliance among five leading European universities of technology:

- (Sweden) Chalmers University of Technology
- (Netherlands) Delft University of Technology
- (Switzerland) ETH Zürich
- (Italy) Polytechnic University of Milan
- (Germany) RWTH Aachen University

On October 6, 1999, the IDEA league was formed by the signing of a memorandum of understanding between four leading European universities of technology: Imperial College London, Delft University of Technology, ETH Zürich, and RWTH Aachen University. In 2006, ParisTech joined the collaboration. As of 2014, Chalmers University of Technology is a member of the IDEA League network. In 2016, Polytechnic University of Milan joined the IDEA League.

Each member has a respectable research-oriented profile and is the largest producer of engineering and science graduates in its own country. One of the IDEA League's main ambitions is to re-establish Europe as a technological and scientific leader by bundling academic resources and knowledge. The term IDEA comes from the first letter of each of the founding institutions.

Imperial College London confirmed its decision to withdraw from the IDEA League with effect from December 2012 due to budgetary reasons. At the end of 2013, Paris Tech left the IDEA League because the university was restructuring in connection with the newly created Paris-Saclay campus.

Currently, three schools of the members of the alliance offer a Joint Masters in Applied Geophysics, where students spend one semester at each university (Delft University of Technology, ETH Zürich and RWTH Aachen University), then spend the fourth semester doing their thesis at one of the schools or in industry. The programme builds on the strengths and the complementary expertise in Earth Science at the three universities. It offers a combination of study and research. During the program students can specialize in either hydrocarbon exploration and management or environmental and engineering investigations, including geothermal energy exploration and management, and will also receive a solid background in the other speciality.

Students of the IDEA League universities are represented by IDEALiStiC.

== Members ==
=== Current Members ===
| Institution | Location | Established | Joined | Rector/President | Total Number of Students** | Website |
|---|---|---|---|---|---|---|
| Delft University of Technology | (Netherlands) Delft | 1842 | 1999 | Tim van der Hagen | 19,000 | |
| ETH Zürich | (Switzerland) Zürich | 1855 | 1999 | Günther Dissertori | 18,000 | |
| RWTH Aachen | (Germany) Aachen | 1870 | 1999 | Ulrich Rüdiger | 42,000 | |
| Chalmers University of Technology | (Sweden) Gothenburg | 1829 | 2014 | Martin Nilsson Jacobi | 11,000 | |
| Polytechnic University of Milan | (Italy) Milan | 1863 | 2016 | Donatella Sciuto | 41,000 | |

Note: **incl. doctoral students, all numbers for 2008

=== Former Members ===
| Institution | Location | Established | Joined | Left | Rector/President | Total Number of Students | Website |
|---|---|---|---|---|---|---|---|
| Imperial College | (United Kingdom) London | 1907 | 1999 | 2012 | Alice Gast | 16,610 (2015) | |
| ParisTech | (France) Paris | 1991 | 2006 | 2013 | Jean-Philippe Vanot | 19,700 (2015) | |

== See also ==
- ASPIRE League – Asian Science and Technology Pioneering Institutes of Research and Education
- National Institutes of Technology – 30 leading public engineering universities in India
