= Menschen Vereeniging Wolbodo =

Dutch student organization

Coordinates: 52.014824°N 4.357510°E

The Mensenvereniging Wolbodo was founded in 1959 as the PSK (Parochiele Studenten Kring) by 17 students, who were Catholic, but did not want to join the Catholic student society Virgiel. In 1960 the name was changed to Sanctus Wolbodo or in Dutch "Sint Wolbodo", referring both to the saint who supposedly is the patron saint of students and to its Catholic nature.

== History ==
The connection with the church was broken in 1967 after a happening with Japanese artist Yayoi Kusama in which the first body painting in the Netherlands took place. In the period 1964-1968 regular jazz performances were organized by Novum Jazz, which attracted an artistic and progressive crowd to Wolbodo.

Whereas for most student societies the membership ends with the finishing of the study (whether the student has graduated or not) at a certain point in time Wolbodo decided that one should be able to be a member whenever one thought of Wolbodo as a place to feel at home.

Influenced by changing attitudes in the 1970s, Wolbodo started calling itself a "people society" (mensenvereniging) instead of student society, and dropped the St in front of the name. Nowadays most people prefer to write it as "Menschen Vereeniging", the same words, written in pre-WWII Dutch.

Although Wolbodo is not a student only society, there is still a strong connection to the Delft University of Technology and Delft student life.

In 2010 Wolbodo had about 80 members.

== Structure ==
In contrast to most student societies that are highly hierarchically structured, Wolbodo is horizontally structured. This is a preciously cultivated form of anarchy within the society. The only form of organisation within the society is the presence of a board.

== Residence ==
Wolbodo's residence is a building located at the Verwersdijk in Delft and is called Novum (new). The main area of this building is the parlor, which can hold up to 100 individuals in the bar. Novum is the property of a foundation, Intra Muros (between walls), better known as IM. The foundation also provides for the necessary maintenance of the building.

== Activities ==
- Wolbodo has three subsocieties: Carrus Plicatus, for those who love folding campers; Ornatus Caput, for those who love silly hats; and Wolga, the rowing subsociety which has its own subsociety Olga, for women.
- OWEE; Ontvangst WEEk, Dutch for Incoming Week, a week of festivities for new students at the beginning of the college year
- Food: Wolbodo serves dinner on Tuesdays, Wednesdays and Thursdays for members and non-members.
- Wine tasting evenings every first Thursday of the month
- Beer tasting evenings with special and novelty beers every last Thursday of the month
- Sunday is movie night.
- Wolpop is an external organisation which aims to support upcoming artists by organizing a festival, called Wolpop, every year. While Wolpop is independent of Wolbodo, most board members of Wolpop are also Wolbodo members.
