= Sint Jansbrug =

Dutch student fraternity

Coordinates: 52°00′34″N 4°21′29″E

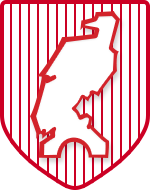
The eagle on bridge logo of the association, nicknamed 'de kip' (the chicken)

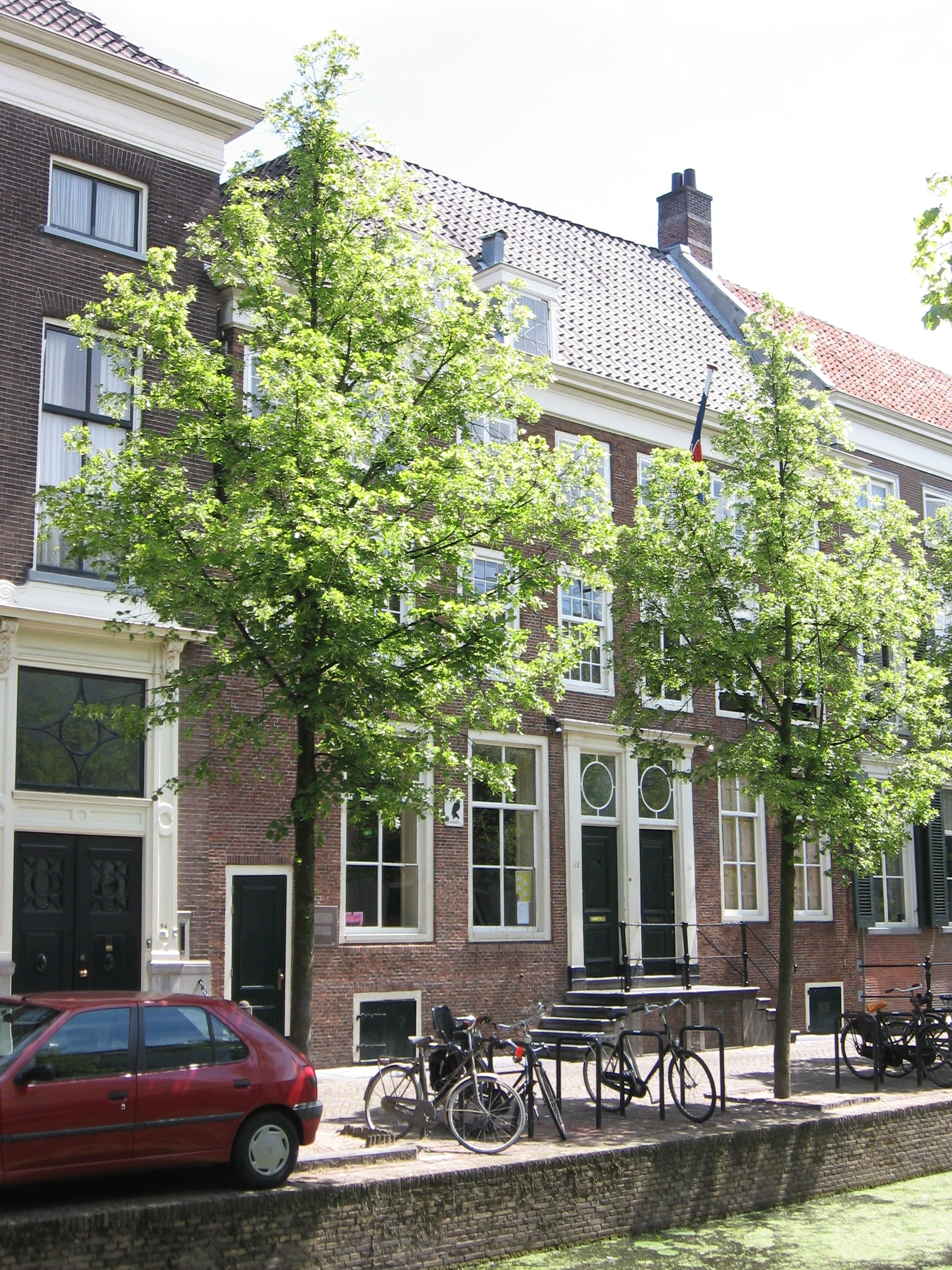
Oude Delft 50-52

Sint Jansbrug (lit. "Bridge of Saint John") is a coed student society in the city of Delft in the Netherlands, founded in 1947. As of 2024, it has roughly 650 members, and owns three historic buildings in the Oude Delft, a street in the centre of Delft. All are national heritage sites.

The society is mid-sized and more accessible than the largest student fraternities in Delft, while retaining traditions and mores. It offers cheap student dinners for both members and non-members, as well as coffee and tea in a coffee-bar called Oele which becomes a bar on Friday evenings.

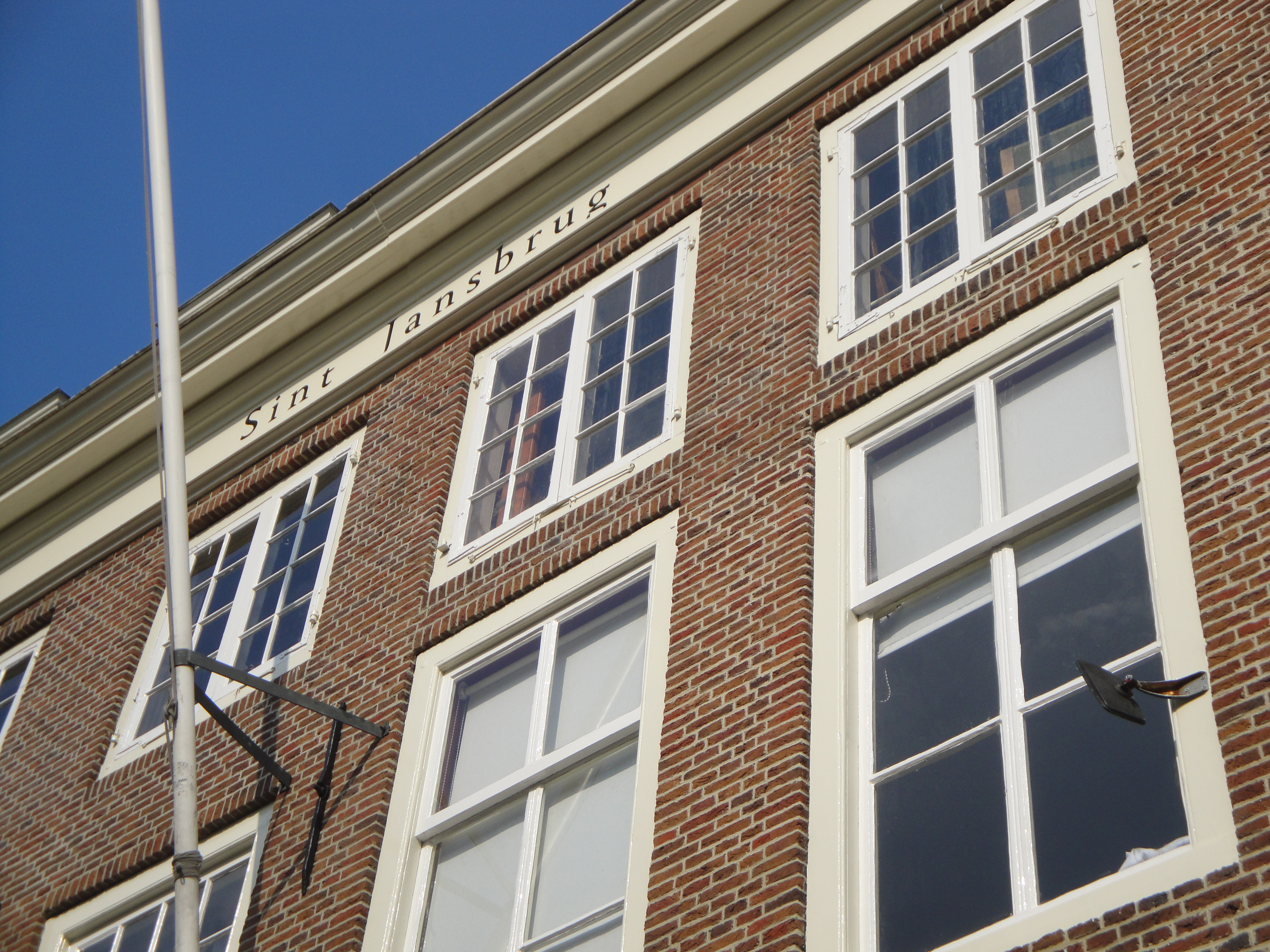
Oude Delft 50, with the fraternity's name

== History ==
Sint Jansbrug was founded on 15 October 1947 by a number of students who lived together in Oude Delft 89 and could not connect with any of the existing student associations.

Sint Jansbrug moved twice in the first 10 years. In 1952 to the Schuttersdoelen and in 1955 to one of the current buildings, Oude Delft 52. The neighbouring building Oude Delft 50 was bought in 1985 and joined with Oude Delft 52 in 1990. The neighbouring building Oude Delft 54 was bought in 2014, and has been converted to student housing for members of Sint Jansbrug.

In 1969, Sint Jansbrug was the first student association in Delft that allowed women to become members next to men. Sint Jansbrug has since also become open to international students.

In honour of the 50th anniversary the members of Sint Jansbrug built “de nieuwe Sint Jansbrug” (lit. "the new Bridge of Saint John"). For a year it stood over the Oude Delft after which it was moved to a permanent location in a nearby park.

On 1 October 2007, at the opening event for the 60 year anniversary, a world record was established by opening 520 bottles of champagne at the same time. This received international media attention, including from American broadcaster ABC.

== Jaarclubs ==
Each year's new members of Sint Jansbrug form a jaarclub (year group), most of which meet weekly on Tuesdays. There are men's, women's, and mixed jaarclubs, with approximately 11–15 members each.

== Gilden ==
Sint Jansbrug also has 13 recognised gilden (guilds). Although the name is derived from the historical craft guild, within Sint Jansbrug a gilde consists of members from different years who share similar interests. Membership is by invitation and open only to those in the second year or above. Not every member of Sint Jansbrug is invited to join a gilde, and not everyone invited becomes a member of the gilde.

== In books and film ==
The fraternity's history has been summarized in the 1997 book Broederlijcken Liiefde and the 2007 documentary film Liieve Leden.
