= Paranymph =

Ceremonial assistant or coach in a ceremony

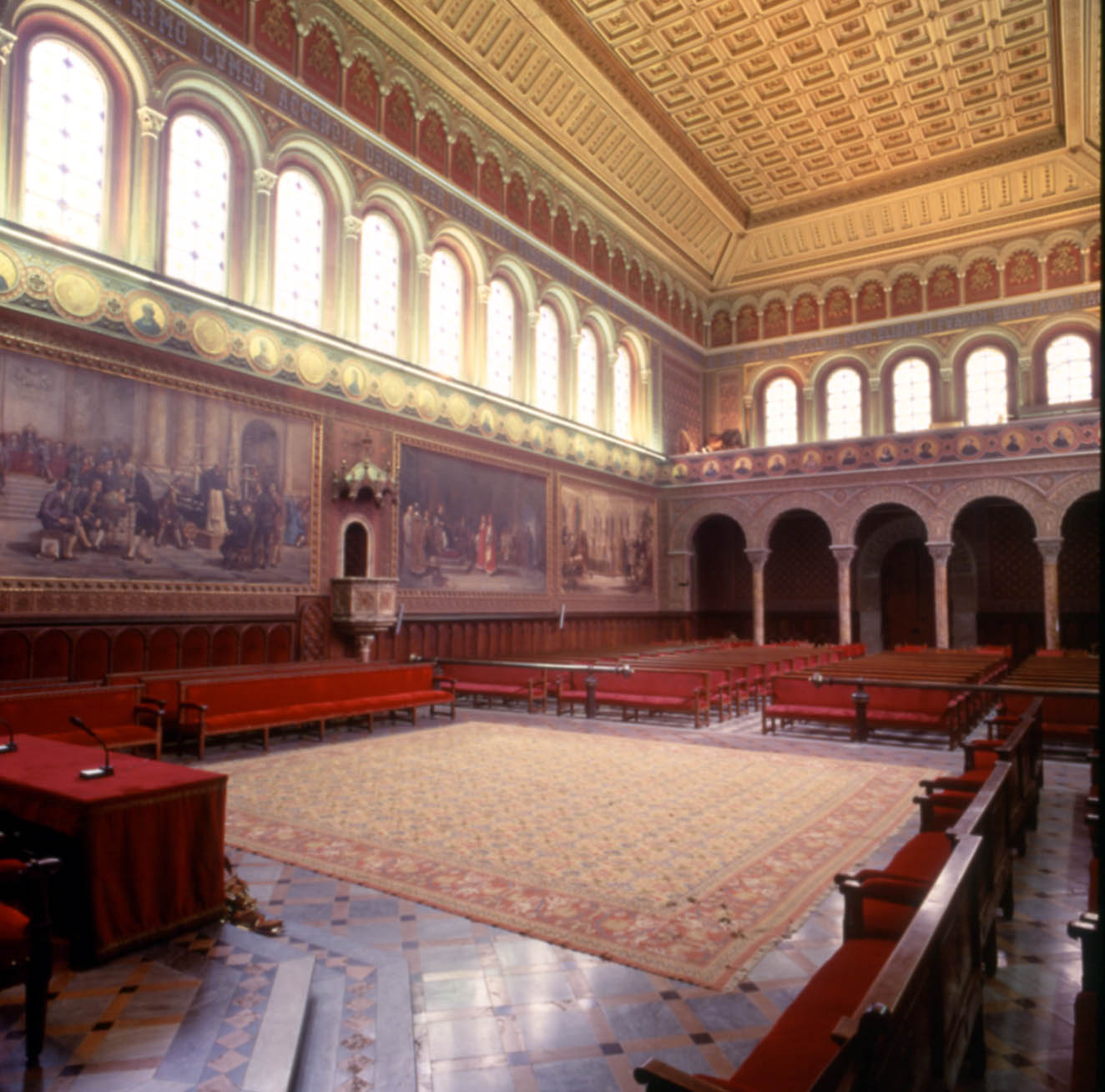
Paranymph of the Universitat de Barcelona historic buiilding

A paranymph is a ceremonial assistant or coach in a ceremony. In ancient Greek weddings, the bride and bridegroom were attended by paranymphs and, from this use, it has been generalized to refer to attendants of doctoral students, best men and bridesmaids in weddings and the like. It can refer specifically to the friend of a bridegroom tasked with accompanying him in a chariot to fetch the bride home.

An obscure use of the word is as a spokesman for the bride or bridegroom, such as Cyrano de Bergerac towards Roxanne.

The word may also refer to a thought that is revealed only by a slip of the tongue, such as a Freudian slip, or a condition where such slippage is endemic.

Today, a paranymph is the name of a ceremonial hall in a university or college.

== The Netherlands ==
In the Netherlands, doctoral candidates may have two paranymphs (paranimfen) that are present at the doctoral thesis defence. This ritual originates from the ancient concept where obtaining a doctorate was seen as a de facto marriage to the university. Furthermore the paranymphs would also act as a backup for the doctoral candidate to ask for advice when answering questions, or even take over answering the questions. Today the role is symbolic and seen as a position of honour similar to a best man or woman at a wedding. A paranymph nowadays is therefore not required to have any knowledge of the subject matter.
