= Formula Manipal =

Race car student project

(India) Manipal
- Full Name: Formula Manipal
- Base: Manipal, India; 13°21′.95″N 74°47′35.9″E
- www.formulamanipal.com

Formula Student World Championship
- Debut: 2008 FSAE Italy
- Latest Competition: Formula Bharat 2026

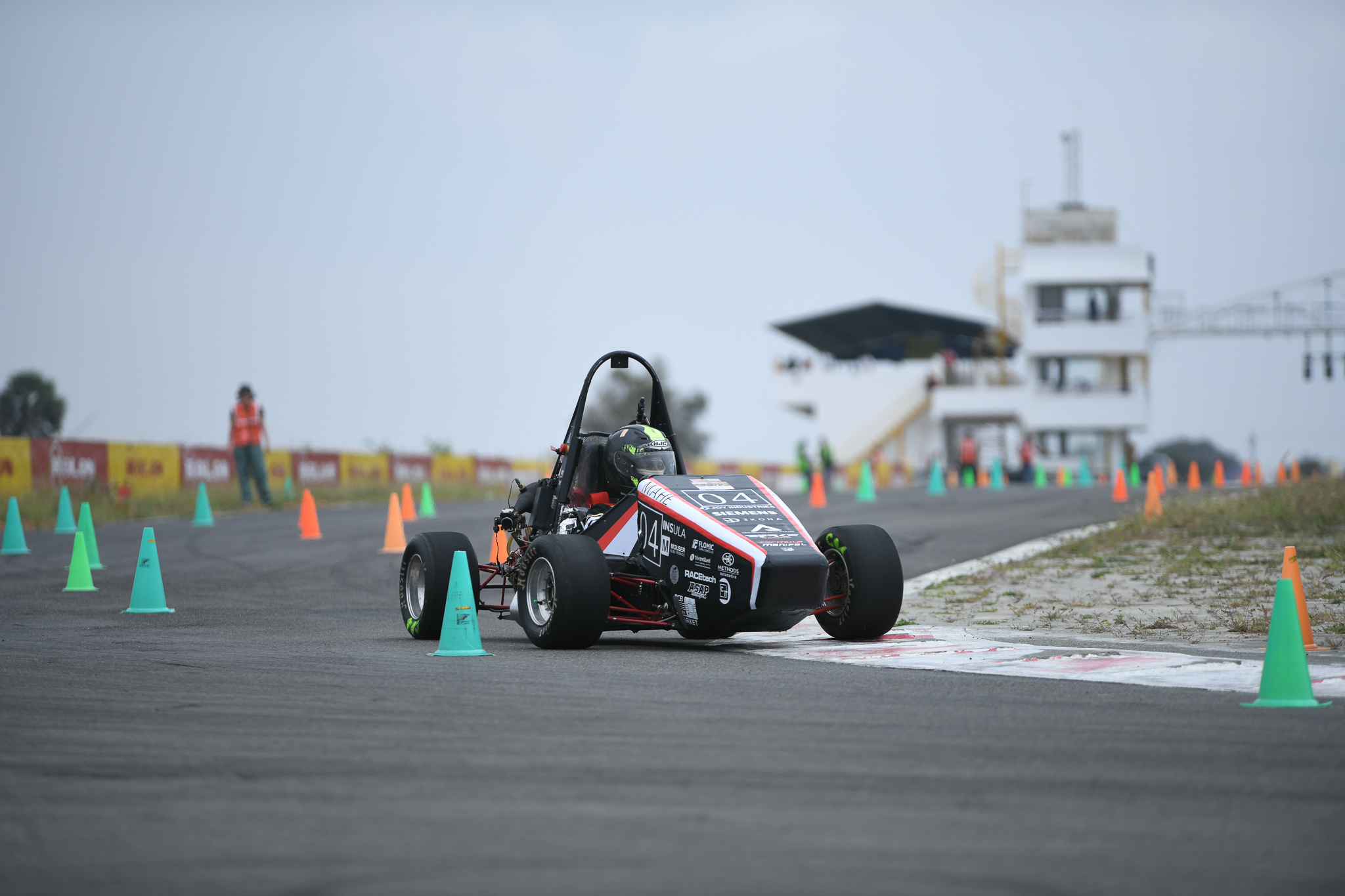
FMXX1b at Formula Bharat 2023

Formula Manipal is a Manipal Academy of Higher Education-based on a student project which aims to design, build and test a Formula-style race car. The team was founded in 2007 and is still active. The team consists many inter-disciplinary undergraduates who aim to conceive, design, fabricate, develop, and compete with Formula style vehicles at International Formula Student events.

Formula Manipal has been competing in the International Formula Student competitions for the past ten years. It made its debut in 2008 at FSAE Italy with the FM08. In the following year, the team participated in the Formula Student event in UK with the FM09. The team then had a successful participation in FS Austria with the FM-X, the season 2010 car. The year 2011 saw the development of the fourth prototype, the FMXI, which competed in FSAE Italy.

Season 2013 turned out to be the most amazing year for Formula Manipal in its history. For the first time, the team successfully participated in two FSAE events in the same calendar year with the FMX3. First, the team went to FS Germany and later to the FS Czech Republic.

FMX4, the season 2014 car scaled new heights at the Formula Design Challenge 2015 winning seven trophies total in the Formula Student Germany and Formula Student Czech Republic 2014.

FMX6, the season 2016 car participated in 3 events which consisted of 2 international, FS Germany 2016 and FS Czech Republic 2016 and the first national Formula Student event, Formula Bharat in the year 2017.

FMX8, the season 2018 car competed in 1 International Formula Student Competition-Formula Student at Austria where the team stood 26th internationally and 1 National Competition Formula Bharat in Coimbatore where the team stood 3rd overall making Formula Manipal one of the best nationally. This season also marked the first ever Formula Manipal Electric Vehicle, the FMX8e.

FM20 and FM20e, the season 2020 cars, participated in Formula Bharat 2020 and secured a position of 8th out of 51 participating team.

FMXX1, the season 2021 car competed in Formula Student Germany, ranking 6th internationally in the Business Plan Event, 17th internationally in the Cost Event, and 19th overall.

The FMXX1 was completely disassembled and remade from scratch again, resolving all the issues faced in FSG2022, and taken as FMXX1b to Formula Bharat 2023, where it stood 2nd in the Cost Event, 3rd in Autocross, 4th in Acceleration, and 5th overall.

== See also ==
- University of Patras Formula Student Team - UoP Racing Team
