= Formula Student Team Delft =

(Netherlands) FS Team Delft
- Full name: Formula Student Team Delft
- Base: Delft, Netherlands; 51°59′58.5″N 4°22′35″E
- Team Manager: (Netherlands) Renee Roozen
- Chief Engineer: (Netherlands) Tim Guezen
- Financial Manager: (Netherlands) Maurits van Kuijk
- Operations Manager: (Netherlands) Matthijs Spoormaker
- Website: www.fsteamdelft.nl

2024 Formula Student Season
- Current Model: DUT24
- Chassis: Aluminium Honeycomb Monocoque
- Motors: 4x Fischer TI-085 35 kW
- Tyres: 16 x 7.5-10
- Electronics: Self-designed ECU, Motor Controllers, Battery Management System and sensor nodes

Formula Student World Championship
- Debut: 2001 Formula Student UK
- Latest race: 2024 Formula Student Germany
- Competitions competed: 16x Formula Student UK; 17x Formula Student Germany; 7x Formula Student Austria; 5x Formula Student Netherlands; 2x Formula Student Spain; 4x Formula Student East; 1x FSAE Michigan
- Competition victories: 2011, 2014, 2015 Formula Student UK; 2008, 2010, 2011, 2012, 2013, 2015 Formula Student Germany; 2016 Formula Student Spain; 2018 Formula Student East; 2019 Formula Student Netherlands
- Design awards: 2003, 2009, 2011, 2012 Formula Student UK; 2009, 2012, 2013 Formula Student Germany; 2016 Formula Student Spain; 2017, 2018 Formula Student East; 2019, 2021 Formula Student Netherlands
- Current World Ranking (electric): 35th (as of 2025-02-14)
- Highest World Ranking (electric): 1st (in 2011, 2012, 2013, 2015)
- Highest World Ranking (combustion): 1st (2013-07-07)

The Formula Student Team Delft (FS Team Delft) is a Dutch Formula Student team based in Delft and composed mostly of students from the Delft University of Technology. The team is known for designing constructing lightweight Formula Student racing cars and competing in the global Formula Student competition since 2001. Having won Formula Student UK three times (2011, 2014, 2015) and Formula Student Germany six times (2008, 2010, 2011, 2012, 2013, 2015), FS Team Delft is currently among the highest ranked teams in the Formula Student competition.

== Team philosophy ==
=== Team composition ===
The FS Team Delft consists of 65 to 85 team members working to design and produce a fast and energy-efficient racing car within one academic year. The team consists of undergraduate students as well as graduate students, representing several faculties at the TU Delft, putting FS Team Delft among the larger and varied teams of the TU Delft and the competition.

=== Education ===
The main goal of the team is education. The team offers students an opportunity to apply the skills and theoretical knowledge acquired from the curriculum at the university, whilst at the same time offer a training ground for other 'soft skills' such as teamwork and communication. Lectures and workshops are organized at the start of every season to teach the team members the fundamentals on race vehicle design. Older members often assist the newcomers during the year, helping ensure the quality of work.

== Racing history ==
=== 4-cylinder era (2000–2002) ===
Founded in 2000 by two students at the TU Delft, the team started their first racing adventure in the summer of 2001. With a group of 20 students, the team managed to come up with a competitive 4 cylinder open-wheel racing car, which ended up finishing as the second best newcomer.
DUT Racing competed again with the same 4-cylinder philosophy the next year with both the old 2001 car and the new DUT02 at Bruntingthorpe in the United Kingdom. This time a nice midfield position was the result.

=== Lightweight (2003–2005) ===
Due to extreme lightweight and 'out-of-the-box thinking' solutions on the car, the rules changed the very next year. The year 2003 is a breaking point in the DUT Racing philosophy. The team came up with a new idea on how a Formula Student car should be designed. Up until then, cars were built with the maximum available power plant that regulations would allow. With a maximum cylinder capacity of 600cc, this meant that teams would use 4-cylinder 600cc engines. The DUT Racing team designed their 2003 car for a lower power standard by using a lighter 530cc KTM 1-cylinder engine. By applying the philosophy of 'less is more' the team managed to build a car of less than 140 kilograms, where the competition would weigh in at no less than 220 kilograms.

Due to this difference in weight, without losing on performance, the team won the design engineering award for the first time. In the next three years, the team would optimize their lightweight concept, eventually resulting in top results in 2006.

=== First results (2006–2007) ===
During the first 6 years, the team had grown significantly. With over 60 students, the team was the biggest TU Delft student project.
The 2006 season would bring the first big success to the Delft team since the Design Award in 2003. With a third place in the new Formula Student competition at the Hockenheimring, Germany, the team got their first podium finish.

The 2007 season brought another success, with the team managing a second place in the FISITA World Championship at Silverstone Circuit, Buckinghamshire, United Kingdom.

=== E85 (2008–2010) ===
As of 2008, the team redesigned their 1-cylinder lightweight concept to a greener and faster fuel, E85. Having used normal petrol for over 7 years, the team set itself a new challenge by converting the Yamaha WR450F engine to an Ethanol (E85) powered engine. First tests on the new concept were conducted by driving the 2007 car (DUT07) with the new engine in the FSAE Michigan competition at the Michigan International Speedway, Michigan, USA. Due to a small problem the car did not finish the race, but the concept did prove itself.

The ethanol powered generation of DUT racing cars (DUT08, DUT09, DUT10), was successful. In the 2008 season, the team came in second at Formula Student UK and won the Formula Student Germany competition. In the 2009 year, the team was successful again in the UK by coming in second for the third year in a row. In 2010, the team won the Formula Student Germany competition for the second time.

=== Electricity (2011–present) ===
After years of loud, fuel burning machines, the competition changed and so did DUT Racing. With the introduction of an electric class in 2010 at the Formula Student UK and Formula Student Germany competition, several top-level teams made the switch to the new power source. The performance showed by the electric cars in the 2010 season, made the DUT Racing team change to the new class in 2011. Not only did the performance play a part in the decision, the challenge of redesigning almost every part of the car and thus challenging the students in their engineering capability also played a role in the switch to electrically powered cars. With the DUT11, the team won both the UK and Germany event.

The DUT12 was the second electric car of the DUT Racing team. The biggest difference compared to the DUT11 was the four-wheel drive system. This made it possible to use the brake energy from all wheels to recharge the batteries, thus making the car more efficient. With a second place at Formula Student UK and another win at Formula Student Germany, the electric drive was again proving successful. With a time of 3,45 seconds on the acceleration test (0-75 meter), the car set the quickest acceleration time by a Formula Student race car. The time was beaten by the ETH Zurich car (0-75m in 3,210s) at the Formula SAE Italy competition in September 2013. Later on, in September 2013, the DUT12 would set a Guinness World Record for acceleration of an electric car, by reaching 100 km/h in 2.13 seconds. As of June 2016, the record is held by the electric car from ETH Zurich.

In 2013, the DUT13 got an aerodynamics package, something the team up until then had never experimented with. Featuring 4-wheel drive, the car now also disposed of a front wing, rear wing and undertray, significantly improving the traction of the car. Additionally, part of the electronics were changed, improving the traction control features and yaw rate controllers. The team won again the Formula Student competition in Germany, and placed second in the competition in Austria.

== Formula Student results ==
(bold indicates championships won. From 2011 onwards, the World Ranking is Electric specific)

Season	Competitions	Venue	Car	Tyres	Propulsion	Result	World Ranking Position
2017	Formula Student East	Euroring Orkeny	DUT17	Apollo Vredestein B.V.	4 AMK Electric motors	3rd (837.7 pts)	2nd (=)
2016	Formula Student Spain	Circuit de Cataluyna-Barcelona	DUT16	Apollo Vredestein B.V.	4 AMK Electric motors	**Champion** (906 pts)	
2016	Formula Student Germany Electric	Hockenheimring	DUT16	Apollo Vredestein B.V.	4 AMK Electric motors	2nd (900 pts)	
2016	Formula Student UK (Class 1)	Silverstone Circuit	DUT16	Apollo Vredestein B.V.	4 AMK Electric motors	17th (528 pts)	
2015	Formula Student Austria	Red Bull Ring	DUT15	Apollo Vredestein B.V.	4 AMK Electric motors	9th (580 pts)	
2015	Formula Student Germany Electric	Hockenheimring	DUT15	Apollo Vredestein B.V.	4 AMK Electric motors	**Champion** (923 pts)	1st (=)
2015	Formula Student UK (Class 1)	Silverstone Circuit	DUT15	Apollo Vredestein B.V.	4 AMK Electric motors	**Champion** (909 pts)	1st (↑)
2014	Formula Student Austria	Red Bull Ring	DUT14	Apollo Vredestein B.V.	4 AMK Electric motors	2nd (784 pts)	2nd (=)
2014	Formula Student Germany Electric	Hockenheimring	DUT14	Apollo Vredestein B.V.	4 AMK Electric motors	3rd (855 pts)	2nd (=)
2014	Formula Student UK (Class 1)	Silverstone Circuit	DUT14	Apollo Vredestein B.V.	4 AMK Electric motors	**Champion** (855 pts)	2nd (=)
2013	Formula Student Austria	Red Bull Ring	DUT13	**HO**	4 AMK Electric motors	2nd (834 pts)	2nd (=)
2013	Formula Student Germany Electric	Hockenheimring	DUT13	**HO**	4 AMK Electric motors	**Champion** (843 pts)	2nd (=)
2013	Formula Student UK (Class 1)	Silverstone Circuit	DUT13	**HO**	4 AMK Electric motors	13th (534 pts)	2nd (↓)
2012	Formula Student Germany Electric	Hockenheimring	DUT12	**HO**	4 AMK Electric motors	**Champion** (933 pts)	1st (=)
2012	Formula Student UK (Class 1)	Silverstone Circuit	DUT12	**HO**	4 AMK Electric motors	2nd (848 pts)	1st (=)
2011	Formula Student Germany Electric	Hockenheimring	DUT11	**HO**	2 AMK Electric motors	**Champion** (909 pts)	1st (↑)
2011	Formula Student UK (Class 1A)	Silverstone Circuit	DUT11	**HO**	2 AMK Electric motors	**Champion** (910 pts)	2nd (New in Electric Ranking)
2010	Formula Student Germany Combustion	Hockenheimring	DUT10	**HO**	Yamaha WR450F	**Champion** (867 pts)	10th (↑)
2010	Formula Student UK (Class 1)	Silverstone Circuit	DUT10	**HO**	Yamaha WR450F	18th (528 pts)	23rd (↓)
2009	Formula Student Germany Combustion	Hockenheimring	DUT09	**HO**	Yamaha WR450F	18th (615 pts)	11th (↓)
2009	Formula Student UK (Class 1)	Silverstone Circuit	DUT09	**HO**	Yamaha WR450F	2nd (786 pts)	3rd (↑)
2008	Formula Student Germany Combustion	Hockenheimring	DUT08	**HO**	Yamaha WR450F	**Champion** (920 pts)	6th (↑)
2008	Formula Student UK (Class 1)	Silverstone Circuit	DUT08	**HO**	Yamaha WR450F	2nd (752 pts)	21st (↑)
2008	FSAE Michigan	Michigan International Speedway	DUT07	**HO**	Yamaha WR450F	23rd (534 pts)	37th (↓)
2007	Formula Student Germany Combustion	Hockenheimring	DUT07	**HO**	Yamaha WR450F	21st (501 pts)	32nd (↓)
2007	Formula Student UK (Class 1)	Silverstone Circuit	DUT07	**HO**	Yamaha WR450F	2nd (889 pts)	8th (↑)
2006	Formula Student Germany Combustion	Hockenheimring	DUT06	**L**	Yamaha WR450F	3rd (808 pts)	37th (↑)
2006	Formula Student UK (Class 1)	Silverstone Circuit	DUT06	**L**	Yamaha WR450F	23rd (423 pts)	93rd (↓)
2005	Formula Student UK (Class 1)	Bruntingthorpe	DUT05	**L**	Yamaha WR450F	19th (442 pts)	80th (↓)
2004	Formula Student UK (Class 1)	Bruntingthorpe	DUT04	**L**	Yamaha WR450F	10th (517 pts)	64th (↑)
2003	Formula Student UK (Class 3)	Bruntingthorpe	DUT04	N/A	N/A	N/A	N/A
2003	Formula Student UK (Class 1)	Bruntingthorpe	DUT03	**G**	KTM 530	21st (303 pts)	92nd (↓)
2002	Formula Student UK (Class 1-200)	Bruntingthorpe	DUT01	**A**	Yamaha YZF-R6	20th (345 pts)	64th (=)
2002	Formula Student UK (Class 1)	Bruntingthorpe	DUT02	**A**	Yamaha YZF-R6	16th (485 pts)	64th (↑)
2001	Formula Student UK (Class 1)	NEC Birmingham	DUT01	**A**	Yamaha YZF-R6	20th (181 pts)	109th (New in Ranking)
