= Cold War Jets Collection =

- Location: Bruntingthorpe Aerodrome
- Coordinates: 52°29′53.09″N 1°6′35.22″W
- Type: Aerospace museum
- Collection size: 18
- Founder: Walton Family

The Cold War Jets Collection (CWJC) was a museum based on the edge of Bruntingthorpe Aerodrome, a former Royal Air Force station located near Lutterworth, Leicestershire in the United Kingdom.

C Walton Ltd owned the airfield, who hosts the CWJC, this is made up of several aviation preservation groups, such as the Lightning Preservation Group (LPG), Classic British Jets Collection (CBJC), GJD AeroTech and previously the Buccaneer Aviation Group (T-BAG).

The airfield was open on Sundays from 10.00 am to 4.00 pm when aircraft were displayed. Demonstrations of fast taxi runs were carried out on the two open days held each year, usually May Bank Holiday Sunday and August Bank Holiday Sunday. Individual Groups also held events of their aircraft, these included fast taxi runs, static engine runs, photoshoots etc.

It was reported in June 2020 that the museum had closed.

The collection reopened at a new location on the edge of Bruntingthorpe Aerodrome during September 2023, based around the QRA hangars, on an invitation only basis. However the museum is now permanently closed.

== Collection ==
Aircraft	Version	Registration	Markings	Last Unit	Owner	Notes
BAC Jet Provost	T.5A	XW290		No. 1 FTS	CBJC	
Dassault Mystère	IVA	85	8-MV	French AF	CWJC	
de Havilland Comet	4C	XS235	G-CPDA	DTEO	CWJC	
de Havilland Sea Venom	FAW.21	WM571			CBJC	
de Havilland Sea Vixen	FAW.2	XJ494	121	A&AEE	CBJC	
de Havilland Venom	FB4	WR470	G-DHVM	Swiss AF	CBJC	
English Electric Canberra	B(I).8	WT333		RAE		
English Electric Lightning	F.6	XR728	JS	No. 11 Squadron RAF	LPG	
	F.6	XS904	BQ	No. 5 Squadron RAF/ No. 11 Squadron RAF	LPG	
Folland Gnat	T.1	XP540		No. 4 FTS	CBJC	
Gloster Meteor	NF.11	WM167			CBJC	
Handley Page Victor	K.2	XM715		No. 55 Squadron RAF	CWJC	
Hawker Hunter	GA.11	WT806		FRADU	CBJC	
	T.8C	XF994			CBJC	
	T.7	XL565	Y	FRADU	GP	
Hawker Sea Hawk	FGA.6	XE368			CBJC	
Hawker Siddeley Nimrod	MR.2	XV226		RAF Kinloss/ RAF St Mawgan Wing	CWJC	
Hunting Jet Provost	T.3A	XM365		No. 1 FTS	CBJC	
Lockheed F-104 Starfighter	G	22+35		jbG34		
	G	22+57		jbG34		
PZL TS-11 Iskra	BIS B	1H-1018		Polish AF	CWJC	
SEPECAT Jaguar	GR.1	XZ382		No. 14 Squadron RAF	CWJC	

== Previous residents ==
Aircraft	Version	Registration	Markings	Last Unit	Owner	Notes
Folland Gnat	T.1	XP534	XR993	No. 4 FTS	Phoenix Aviation	to South Wales Aviation Museum
Hawker Siddeley Buccaneer	S.2B	XW544	Y	No. 16 Squadron RAF	T-BAG	to Cotswold Airport
	S.2B	XX889	T	No. 12 Squadron RAF	T-BAG	to South Wales Aviation Museum
	S.2B	XX894	020	No. 208 Squadron RAF	T-BAG	to Cotswold Airport
	S.2B	XX900		No. 208 Squadron RAF	CWJC	to Tatenhill Airfield
SEPECAT Jaguar	T.2A	XX145		ETPS	CWJC	to Boscombe Down Aviation Collection
Vickers VC10	K.4	ZD241	N	No. 101 Squadron RAF	GS	Scrapped
