= IIT Bombay Racing =

(India) IIT Bombay Racing
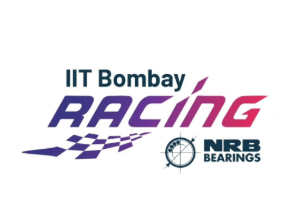
- [[ Racing_iitb ]]
- Full name: IIT Bombay Racing
- Base: Mumbai, India; 19°08′.24″N 72°54′47.88″E
- Faculty Advisor: (India) Prof. Sandeep Anand
- Team Leader: (India) Varun Pathak
- Website: www.iitbracing.org
- Facebook: www.facebook.com/iitbracing/
- Twitter: www.twitter.com/iitb_racing
- Instagram: www.instagram.com/iitbombayracing

2016 Formula Student UK
- Car Name: EvoK
- Chassis: Steel Tubular Space Frame
- Powertrain: 40 kW @ 4770 RPM 80 Nm @ 4770 RPM
- Battery: 95S1P 7.72 kWh LiPo battery, 400 V max., 400 A max.
- Tires: Hoosier 20.5 x 7.5 x 13

Formula Student World Championship
- Debut: 2008 Formula Student Michigan
- Latest race: 2019 Formula Student UK
- Competitions competed: 7x FS UK; 3x BAJA SAE INDIA; 1x FSAE Michigan

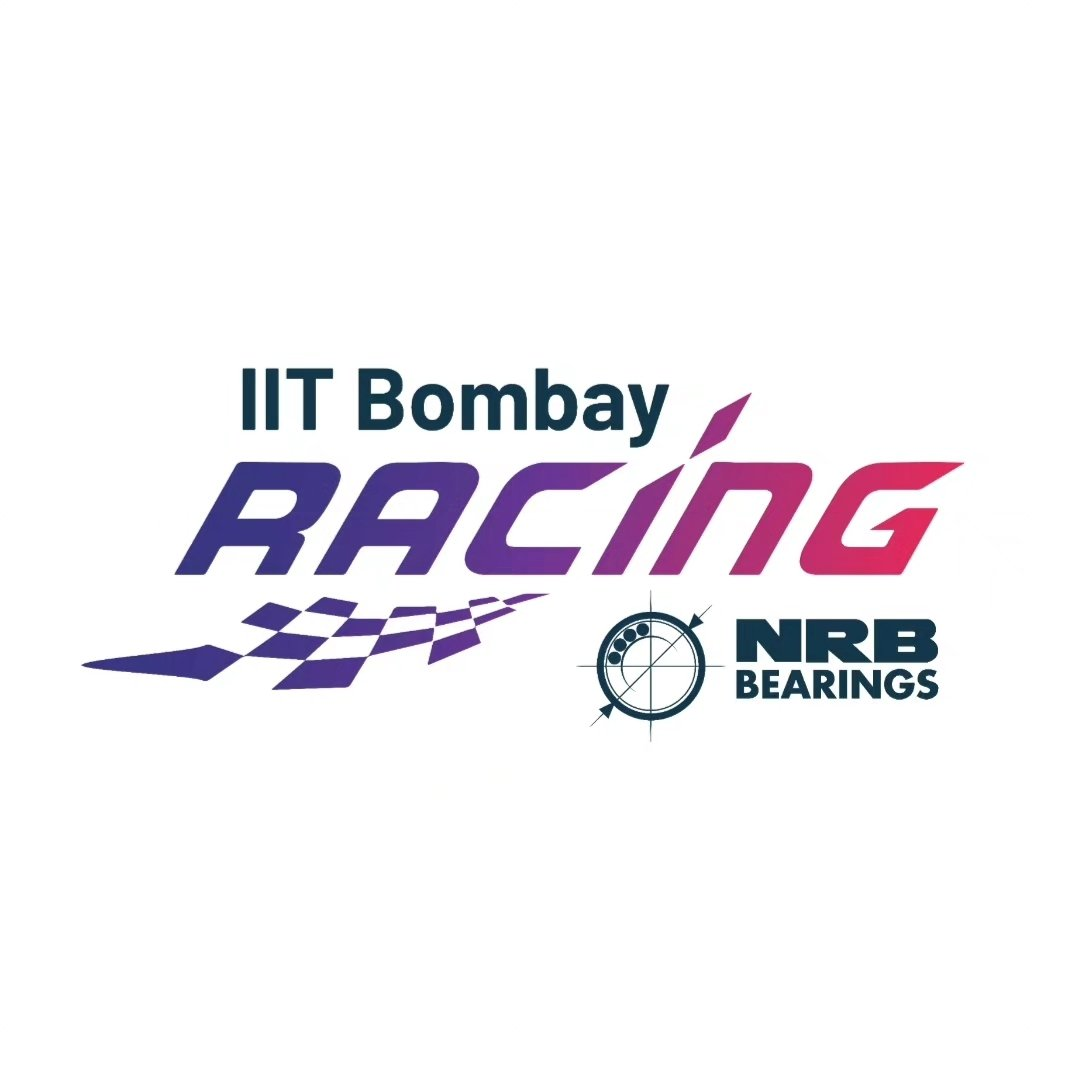
IITB racing team

IIT Bombay Racing is a Formula Student team from India based at Indian Institute of Technology Bombay since 2007.

IIT Bombay Racing made its debut at Formula Student Michigan, 2008 with an entry car Vayu as only Indian team participating in the event. In the following year, the team participated in Formula Student UK, 2009 at Silverstone Circuit with entry car Agni and was 2nd best Asian entry at Formula Student UK. The team also achieved highest score among Indian participating teams along with a 2nd rank in Cost Event.

In the year 2012, IIT Bombay Racing developed Prithvi 3.0 securing 1st in low weight sustainability and won the best car award by peers at the Baja SAE India event held at Pithampur. The same year also witnessed the launch of EVo 1.0, India's first student designed electric racing vehicle.

Since 2012, the team has launched 11 electric vehicles with giant leaps in design and performance.

== Team Philosophy ==
IIT Bombay Racing Team has established itself as one of the Indian Formula Student Electric team. Its stated vision is "Driving innovation and powering sustainability." The team designs, builds, and races electric vehicles in Formula Student competitions and contributes to projects related to the electric vehicle ecosystem.

== Achievements ==
=== Competition Achievements ===
- 2025–26 Season:
  - Formula Student Portugal: Placed 1st overall in the Electric and Driverless Cup category. Sectional podiums included 1st in Engineering Design Presentation (EDP), 1st in Efficiency, 2nd in Endurance, and 2nd in Cost & Manufacturing.
  - Formula Bharat: Finished 3rd overall in the Electric category. Won 1st in Engineering Design and Statics, 2nd in Cost & Manufacturing, and the Best Powertrain Design award. The team also became the first Indian team to unveil a Driverless (DV) platform at this event.
  - Formula Student Switzerland: Placed 13th overall.
- 2024 – Secured 1st overall at Formula Student Bharat, along with 2nd place in Cost, 3rd place in Engineering Design, and a *Special Award for Best Control.
- 2022 – Finished 3rd overall at Formula Student UK, placing 2nd in Engineering Design, 3rd in Cost and Manufacturing, and *3rd in Real-World AI.
- 2021 – Won the overall title at the Formula Student UK Concept Class; received Best Business Presentation at Formula Student Bharat; and earned a Formula Student UK award recognizing design improvements and financial performance.
- 2020 – Awarded Best EV Design Presentation at the Formula Student Electric Vehicle (FSEV) Concept Challenge.
- 2019 , 2018, 2016, 2015, 2014 – Received a Formula Student UK award for design improvements and financial performance.
- 2012 – Won five awards at BAJA SAE, including the *AQ Peer’s Choice Award for Best ATV.
- 2011 – Received the RAFTAR Award at BAJA SAE for the *lightest and fastest vehicle.
- 2009 – Won the Best Engineering Design Award at BAJA SAE.
- 2008 – Debuted at Formula SAE Michigan, earning Best New Entrant and the Best Perseverance Award.

== Vehicles ==
=== General specifications ===
The following are the general specifications common to every car built by IIT Bombay Racing.

Chassis	Single-piece carbon fibre monocoque · Carbon fibre–aluminium honeycomb sandwich structure · Twill weave carbon fibre prepreg, oven cured
Aerodynamics	Fully carbon fibre front wing, rear wing and side trays · Designed through CFD simulations · Manufactured entirely in-house
Drivetrain	2× PMSM Emrax 188 motors · Combined power: 80 kW / 105 bhp · Single-stage planetary gearbox
Accumulator	400 V Li-ion battery · Laser-welded cylindrical cells · Custom BMS monitoring cell temperature and state of charge
Suspension	Double wishbone · Pushrod configuration · Front & rear anti-roll bar (ARB)
Electronics	In-house designed PCBs for vehicle controls, data communication and data acquisition · Interactive touchscreen dashboard with live telemetry and driver performance controls

=== Vayu ===
Vayu was the first car fabricated by IIT Bombay Racing, participating at FSAE Michigan in 2008. It was the only Indian team participating at the competition. The team won the Perseverance Award and Best New Entrant Award.

Car Number	01 IC Car (FSAE Michigan)
Engine	Honda CBR 600 F4i
Differential type	Honda Integra GSR 92-93 Quaife ATB Helical LSD · Chain drive
Tires	Hoosier 20"×6.5"-13" · Alloy 13"×5.5" Aura alloy wheels
Total Weight	288 kg

=== Agni ===
Agni participated at FSAE UK in 2009 at Silverstone Circuit, UK. It was the 2nd best Asian entry at the competition. The team achieved the highest score among participating Indian teams along with 2nd rank in Cost Event and 9th rank in Business Presentation.

Car Number	02 IC Car (FSAE UK)
Engine	Honda CBR 600 F4i
Differential type	Honda Integra GSR 92-93 Quaife ATB Helical LSD · Chain drive
Tires	Hoosier 20"×6.5"-13" · Alloy 13"×5.5" Aura alloy wheels
Total Weight	275 kg

=== EVo 1.0 ===
IIT Bombay Racing launched EVo 1.0 in 2012, India's first electric race car, marking a breakthrough in Indian racing history.

Car Number	01 EV Car (FSAE UK)
Battery	Lithium polymer pouch cells · Elithion distributed BMS with passive balancing
Motors	95R Agni motors · Brushed PM DC motors · 60 kW @ 78 V
Differential type	Honda Integra GSR 92-93 Quaife ATB Helical LSD · Chain drive
Tires	Hoosier 20"×6.5"-13" · Al alloy rims
Total Weight	388 kg

=== EVo 2.0 ===
EVo 2.0 participated in FSAE UK 2013. It was the first Indian race car to implement an electronic differential successfully. The team achieved an overall rank of 54th out of 120 teams and was the first Indian car to complete all safety checks and participate in dynamic events.

Car Number	02 EV Car (FSAE UK)
Battery	LiPo battery packs · 20S×2 configuration · Dow Kokam cells 60 A-h
Motors	95R Agni motors · Brushed PM DC motors · 60 kW @ 72 V
Differential type	Electronic differential · Two-step linear gearbox with helical gears
Tires	Hoosier 20.5"×6"-13" · Al alloy rims
Total Weight	290 kg

=== EVo 3.0 ===
EVo 3.0 participated in FSAE UK 2014. It was the first Indian FS car to complete all static and dynamic events, and the first to qualify for the endurance event. The team achieved a rank of 15th among 33 participating electric cars and received the Formula Student Award of £3,000.

Car Number	03 EV Car (FSAE UK)
Performance	Maximum lateral acceleration: 1.5g · 0–75 km/h in 4.8 sec
Battery	LiPo battery packs · 20S×2 configuration · Dow Kokam cells 60 A-h
Motors	Lynch motors · Brushed PM DC motors · 60 kW @ 72 V
Differential type	Electronic differential with torque vectoring · Two-step linear gearbox
Tires	Hoosier 20.5"×7"-13" · Al alloy rims
Total Weight	264 kg

=== EVo 4.0 ===
EVo 4.0 participated in FSAE UK 2015. IIT Bombay Racing fabricated an aluminium honeycomb monocoque chassis, a feat achieved for the first time by an Indian team. The team received the Formula Student Award of £3,000 for the second consecutive year.

Car Number	04 EV Car (FSAE UK)
Performance	Maximum lateral acceleration: 1.7g · 0–75 km/h in 4.29 sec
Battery	3P96S configuration · 400/370 V
Motors	Compact Dynamics motors · Brushless DC motors · 42 kW peak power
Differential type	Electronic differential · Hybrid planetary gearbox
Tires	Hoosier 20.5"×7"-13" · Al alloy rims
Total Weight	300 kg

=== Orca ===
Orca participated in Formula Student UK 2016. IIT Bombay Racing fabricated carbon fibre bodyworks in-house, a first by a student team at IIT Bombay. The team received the Formula Student Award of £3,000 for the third consecutive year. The team completed all static events and participated in the endurance event.

Car Number	05 EV Car (Formula Student UK 2016)
Performance	Maximum lateral acceleration: 1.7g · 0–75 km/h in 4.29 sec
Battery	LiPo battery packs · 20S×2 configuration · Dow Kokam cells 60 A-h
Motors	Compact Dynamics motors · Brushless DC motors · 80 kW @ 370 V nominal
Differential type	Electronic differential · Planetary gearbox
Tires	Hoosier 20.5"×7.5"-13" · Al alloy rims
Total Weight	242 kg

=== EvoX ===
EvoX was the 6th electric race car developed by IIT Bombay Racing, marking the team's transition to a fully carbon fibre monocoque chassis manufactured entirely in-house.

Car Number	06 EV Car
Battery	400 V Li-ion · Laser-welded cylindrical cells · Custom BMS
Motors	2× PMSM Emrax 188 · 80 kW / 105 bhp combined · 90 Nm peak torque
Drivetrain	Single-stage planetary gearbox

=== EvoK ===
EvoK was the 7th electric race car developed by IIT Bombay Racing, participating in Formula Student UK 2019 at Silverstone Circuit.

Car Number	07 EV Car (Formula Student UK 2019)
Performance	0–100 km/h: 3.47 sec · Top speed: 145+ km/h · Power: 108 bhp · Weight: 245 kg
Battery	95S1P Li-ion · 351 V · 7.72 kWh · 400 A max · Custom BMS
Motors	2× PMSM Emrax 188 · 80 kW / 105 bhp combined · 90 Nm peak torque
Drivetrain	Single-stage planetary gearbox · Final drive ratio: 4.55
Tires	Hoosier 20.5 × 7.5 × 13

=== E12 (EvoLV) ===
E12, also known as EvoLV, was the 8th electric race car developed by IIT Bombay Racing, featuring a refined 96S2P lithium-ion accumulator and an improved aerodynamic package.

Car Number	08 EV Car (E12 / EvoLV)
Performance	0–100 km/h: 2.88 sec · Top speed: 158 km/h · Max power: 80 kW
Battery	96S2P Li-ion · 403.2 V peak / 355.2 V nominal · 7.95 kWh · 330 A max discharge · Custom BMS
Motors	2× PMSM Emrax 188 · 80 kW combined · 90 Nm peak torque
Drivetrain	Single-stage planetary gearbox · Final drive ratio: 4.55
Weight bias	52% Rear

=== E13 (Etherion) ===
E13, named Etherion, was the 9th electric race car developed by IIT Bombay Racing. Etherion secured 1st overall at Formula Student Bharat 2024, along with 2nd place in Cost, 3rd in Engineering Design, and a Special Award for Best Control.

Car Number	09 EV Car (E13 / Etherion)
Performance	0–100 km/h: 3.2 sec · Top speed: 160 km/h · Max power: 80 kW
Battery	90S6P Li-ion · 378 V peak / 324 V nominal · 8.1 kWh · Self-developed BMS
Motors	2× PMSM Emrax 188 · 80 kW combined · 90 Nm peak torque
Drivetrain	Single-stage planetary gearbox · Final drive ratio: 4.55
Weight bias	55% Rear

=== E14 ===
E14 is the 10th electric race car and the current car under development by IIT Bombay Racing, continuing the team's established carbon fibre monocoque architecture and dual Emrax 188 powertrain.

Car Number	10 EV Car (E14) — Current
Battery	400 V Li-ion · Laser-welded cylindrical cells · Custom BMS
Motors	2× PMSM Emrax 188 · 80 kW / 105 bhp combined · 90 Nm peak torque
Drivetrain	Single-stage planetary gearbox
