= UoP Racing team =

Greek Formula Student team

(Greece) UoP Racing Team
- Full name: University of Patras Racing Team
- Base: Patras, Greece; 38°15′0″N 21°44′0″E
- Advising Professor: (Greece) George Chryssolouris
- Website: uopracingteam.com

Formula Student World Championship
- Debut: 2002 Formula Student UK
- Latest race: 2016 Formula Student Czech Republic
- Competitions competed: 13x Formula Student UK; 2x Formula Student Germany; 1x FSAE Michigan; 3x Formula ATA; 2x Formula Czech Republic
- Competition Victories: 2003, 2006 Formula Student UK; 2014 Formula Student Czech Republic
- Special awards: 2003 Formula Student UK IMechE Design Award winner 2006 Formula Student UK Autodesk Design Award winner
- Current World Ranking (electric): 32nd (as of February 6th 2017 )

UoP Racing Team is the first and longest running Greek Formula Student team located in University of Patras. Founded in 2002 and supported throughout the years by the Laboratory for Manufacturing Systems & Automation, UoP Racing team members design, develop and manufacture high-performance racecars that compete in the Formula Student series around the globe, alongside hundreds of teams from all over the world.

== The team's ethos ==
=== Background and origins ===
The idea was born in 2000 when a few students from the Mechanical Engineering & Aeronautics department of the University of Patras decided to build a single-seater racecar and participate in the worldwide competitions of Formula Student. At that time their experience came only from books and their resources were limited. However, under the support of the Laboratory for Manufacturing Systems & Automation, as well as the guidance of professor George Chryssolouris, they managed to gather a team and build their first -of many- single-seater formula style racecar.

=== Philosophy and education ===
The main goal of the team is education and working in the team gives students a great opportunity to gain a lot of experience and qualifications. The students that participate in the team are mainly students from the Mechanical Engineering and Aeronautics department of the University of Patras. However, since 2013 the team includes students from other departments, such as Electrical Engineering, Computer Science, Economics and Business Administration. The members are divided in several modules/sub-teams, with each module having one leader who coordinates all members.

Since 2014 the team operates under a new philosophy of resource efficiency. Design and materials are assessed in a way which factors in environmentally friendliness and also price to performance ratio. This led to the adoption of an “out of the box” thinking, which can lead to the creation of innovative ideas and novel manufacturing approaches that are foreign in areas with established technologies. This mentality precisely defines the FSAE/FS competitions.

== History ==
UoP Racing team has been competing officially from 2002 in the aforementioned competitions, and has already built its own history, designing and manufacturing 10 single-seater racecars as of 2024. Highlights include an overall Class 1 win (FS Czech 2014) and winning two times in Class 2 (FS 2003 and 2006), gaining the first position in all events, as well as the special design prize provided by the Institution of Mechanical Engineers (IMechE). In addition, UoP Racing is one of the few Formula Student teams that has won the 1st place in a particular event (Cost & Manufacturing) in back to back competitions (Formula SAE Italy 2016 and Formula Student Czech Republic 2016).

=== UoP1 (Year: 2002-2004) ===
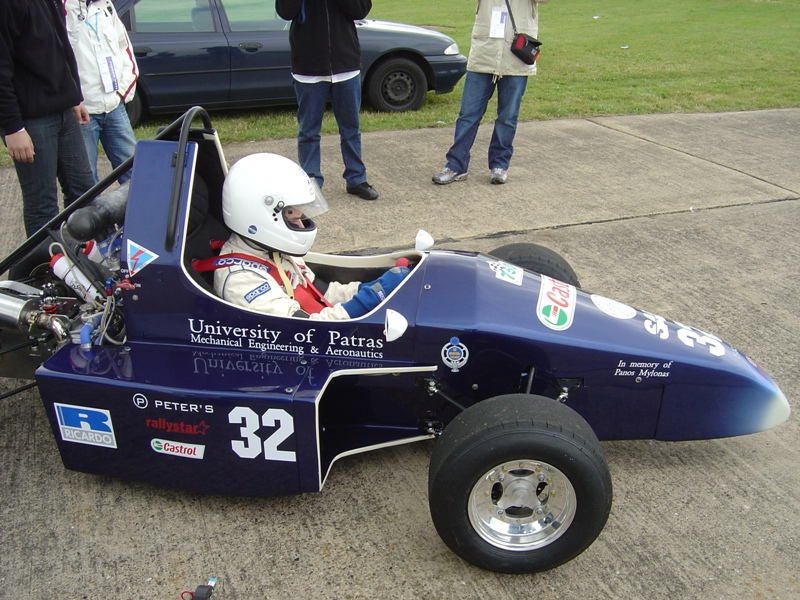
The beginning of it all, UoP1 (year:2002)

As stated before, 2002 was the starting point of UoP Racing and subsequently the Formula Student programme in Greek universities. Seven students of the department of Mechanical Engineering and Aeronautics at the University of Patras had the idea to build a racecar and take part in Formula Student competitions. The concept was then completely unknown in Greece, and the resources available were really limited. UoP1 was way ahead of its time, featuring an (in-house built) hybrid composite monocoque chassis, with a removable subframe, 10” wheels to minimize unsprung mass and inertia, and a 4-cylinder Yamaha engine. The team went on to win the IMechE Design award and conquered the first place in the overall scoreboard of the Class 2 in FSUK (the only European competition back in the day, held in the Bruntingthorpe Aerodrome) in 2003 and was the first ever Greek entry in Class 1 in 2004. Reliability issues prevented the team to score high, but the experience gained from the competitions was of utmost importance for the evolution and future potential of the team. Since 2014, UoP1 has found a new home in the Hellenic Motor Museum as part of the permanent exhibition "Made by Hellas", to serve as a reminder of how it all began.

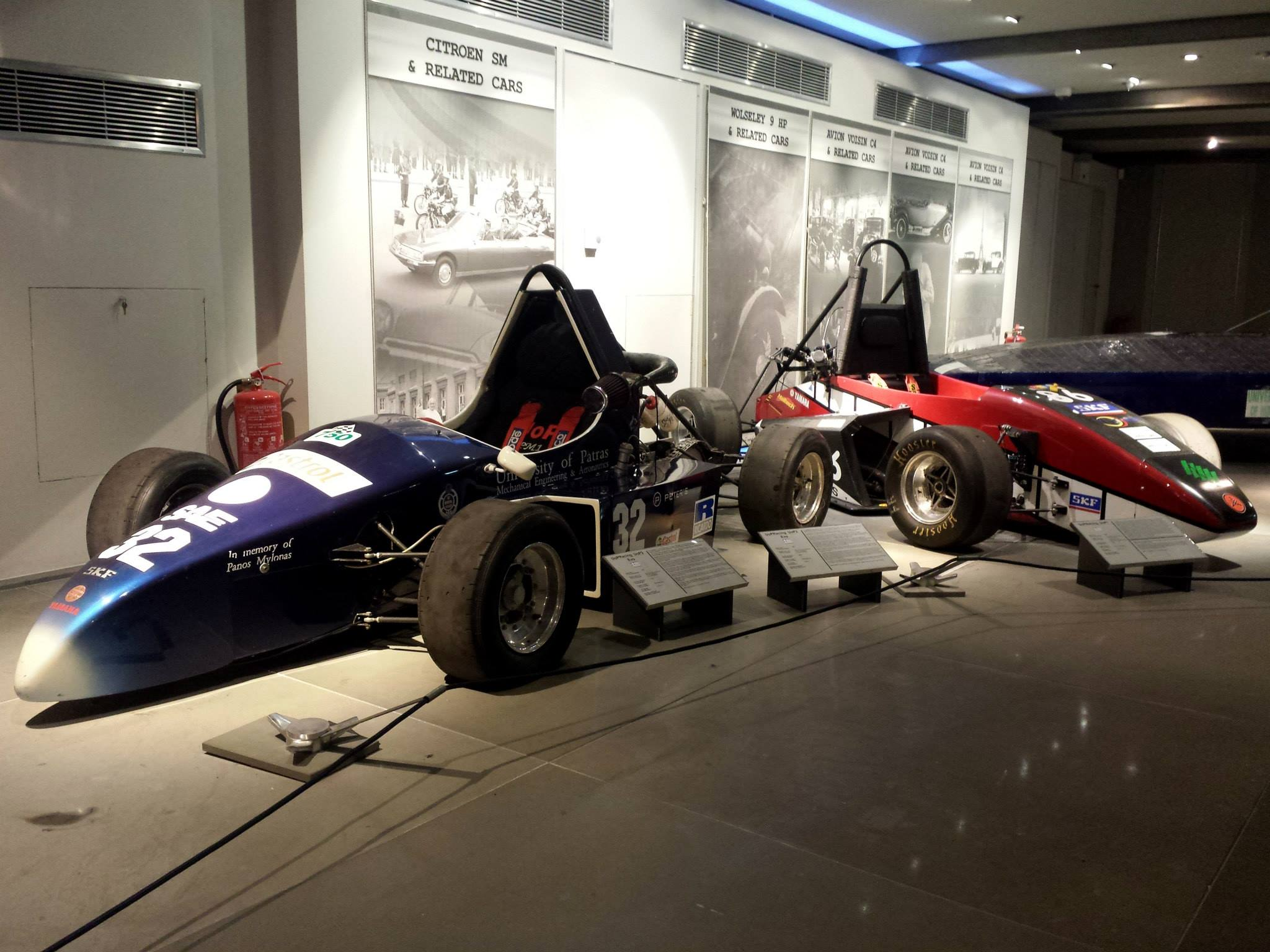
UoP1 and UoP3Evo exhibited at the Hellenic Motor Museum

Characteristics	Specifications
Length/Width/Height/Wheelbase	2537mm/1431mm/1146mm/1650mm
Track (front/rear)	1240mm/1220mm
Weight with 150 lb driver	280 kg
Suspension (front/rear)	Double unequal length A-Arm. Push rod actuated horizontally oriented spring and damper/Double unequal length A-Arm. Push rod actuated horizontally oriented spring and damper
Wheels (front/rear)	6 inch wide, 2 pc Al Rim, 2 inch negative offset/6 inch wide, 2 pc Al Rim, 2 inch negative offset
Brake System	Cast Iron, hub mounted, 160mm dia., 5mm thick, vented, Nissin, 2 piston model caliper /Cast Iron, Differential mounted, 215mm dia., 5mm thick, vented, Nissin, 2 piston model caliper
Frame Construction	carbon fiber Monocoque 2 piece front section / hybrid rear sub frame (aluminum sheet/steel tubes)
Frame Materials	Woven CC201 Carbon fiber, 4130 Laser-cut sheet steel, 4130 25mm OD tubing
Engine	1996 Yamaha YZF600R 4cyl
Bore/stroke/cylinders/cc	62mm bore/49,6mm stroke/4 cylinder/ 599 cc
Fuel system	Student des/built, fuel injection, sequential
Max power RPM/Max Torque RPM	8500rpm/6500rpm
Drive Type	520 Chain 0-Ring
Differential	Limited slip Torsen T-1(University Special)

=== UoP2 (Year: 2005-2007) ===
Aiming for the continuation of the project in the University of Patras, a brand new team of nine students participated in the 2005 FS Competition for the first time, as a Class 3 entry, presenting a new design solution for the next FS car to be manufactured. Simpler, cheaper and more straightforward solutions were adopted throughout the development of the car, using a steel tubular spaceframe and directly actuated dampers. UoP2 also marked the beginning of the single cylinder engine era for the team. All of the changes led to a more advanced and lighter car than UoP1.

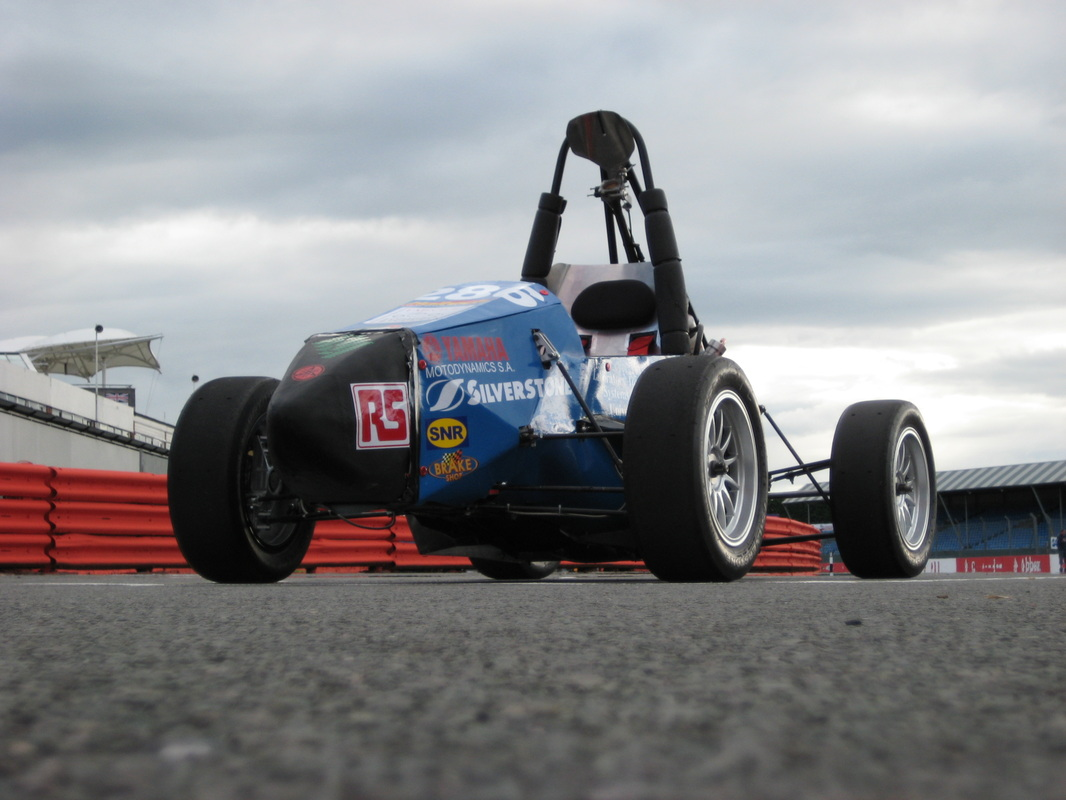
UoP2 (year:2005-2007)

Characteristics	Specifications
Length/Width/Height/Wheelbase	2590mm/1574mm/1247mm/1530mm
Track (front/rear)	1000mm/1050mm
Weight including 68 kg driver (front/rear)	134/155
Suspension (front/rear)	Unequal length A-Arm. Fox DHX 2.0 spring/damper units installed above chassis, Direct actuated via push-rods
Tires (front/rear)	160/530 R13 Silverstone FTZ Sport Slick / 160/530 R13 Silverstone FTZ Sport Slick
Wheels (front/rear)	6x13, -6mm offset AISi7Mg aluminum alloy / 6x13, -6mm offset AISi7Mg aluminum alloy
Brake System	2x220mm Cast Iron drilled rotors at front, 1x256mm differential-mounted drilled disc at rear, 3xBrembo 2-piston caliper, Tilton balance bar
Frame Construction	Steel (Chromoly 4130H Steel) tubes space frame
Engine	Modified 2003 Yamaha XT600E (3AJ)
Bore/stroke/cylinders/cc	95mm bore / 84mm stroke / 1 cylinder / 600cc
Fuel	98 octane unleaded gasoline
Fuel system	Haltech E6X, sequential injection, direct ignition
Max power RPM/Max Torque RPM	8500rpm/6500rpm
Drive Type	5 speed sequential gearbox
Differential	Modified Torsen T1 LSD University Special

=== UoP2Evo (Year: 2008-2009) ===
UoP2Evo is an almost complete upgrade of the UoP2. Using the same basic components, the chassis was redesigned to improve stiffness. At the same time, changes to almost all subsystems led to a further reduction of its total weight. Track was increased for stability, while dampers actuation was changed to pushrod. Moreover, a completely new, lighter and higher quality bodywork was built. The car participated successfully in all the events of the competitions UoP Racing took part in, which again helped the team gain valuable experience for development of future cars.

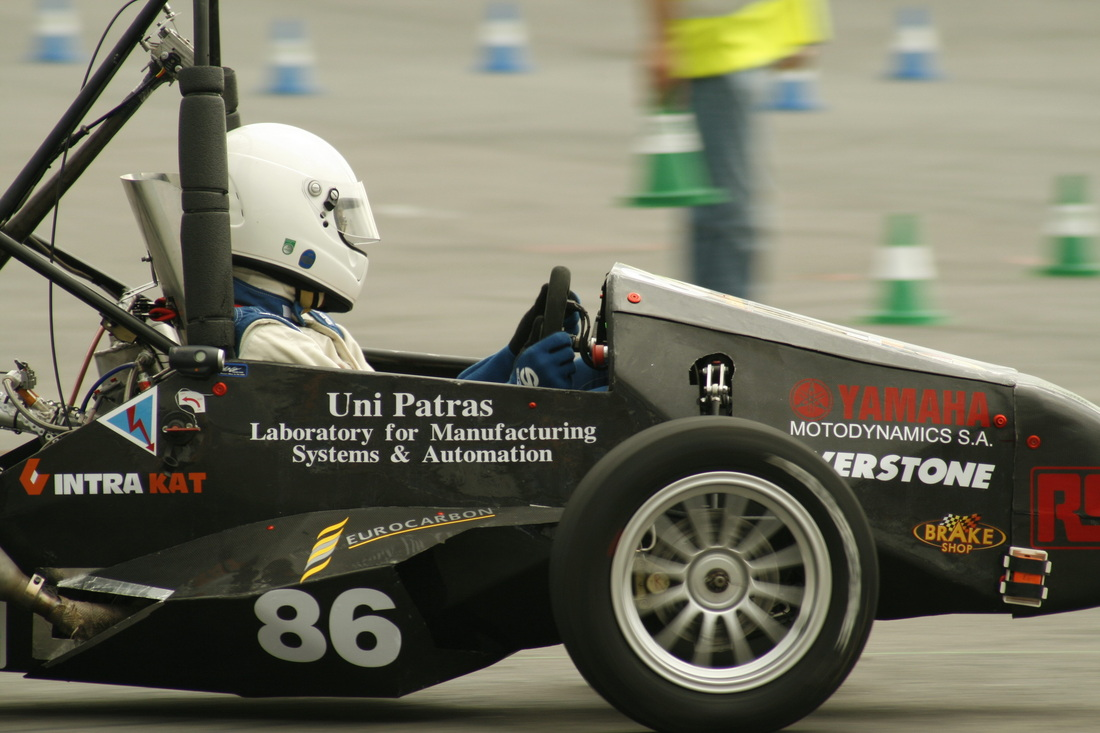
The upgraded UoP2Evo (year:2008)

Characteristics	Specifications
Length/Width/Height/Wheelbase	2590mm/1574mm/1247mm/1530mm
Track (front/rear)	1210mm/1200mm
Weight including 68 kg driver (front/rear)	124/144
Suspension (front/rear)	Unequal length A-Arm. Fox DHX 5.0 spring/damper units installed above chassis, actuated via push-rods
Tires (front/rear)	160/530 R13 Silverstone FTZ Sport Slick / 160/530 R13 Silverstone FTZ Sport Slick
Wheels (front/rear)	76x13, -6mm offset AISi7Mg aluminum alloy / 6x13, -6mm offset AISi7Mg aluminum alloy
Brake System	2x220mm Cast Iron drilled rotors at front, 1x256mm differential-mounted drilled disc at rear, 3xBrembo 2-piston caliper, Tilton balance bar
Frame Construction	Steel (Chromoly 4130H Steel) tubes space frame
Engine	Modified 2003 Yamaha XT600E (3AJ)
Bore/stroke/cylinders/cc	95mm bore / 84mm stroke / 1 cylinder / 600cc
Fuel	98 octane unleaded gasoline
Fuel system	Haltech E6X, sequential injection, direct ignition
Max power RPM/Max Torque RPM	8500rpm/6500rpm
Drive Type	5 speed sequential gearbox
Differential	Modified Torsen T1 LSD University Special

=== UoP3 (Year: 2009-2010) ===
An alternative way of manufacturing came up during the designing process of UoP3. The changes applied would bring a major innovation in team's history. A new frame was constructed from carbon fiber monocoque which became a key ingredient for UoP racing. The car being lightweight was a top priority and that led to a change in the engine used, as the team switched from a Yamaha XT600E (3AJ) to a Yamaha WR450. The third generation of the team, which consisted of 12 students, gathered all the feedback and experience from the design and construction of the two previous cars and aimed high. The racecar competed only in the FSAE Michigan competition of that year and proved significantly lighter than its predecessors. As of November 2016, UoP3 remains the lightest racecar of UoP Racing, weighing 175 kilos.

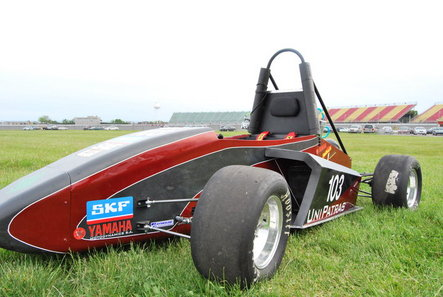
UoP3 (year: 2010)

Characteristics	Specifications
Length/Width/Height/Wheelbase	2537mm/1431mm/1146mm/1650mm
Track (front/rear)	1240mm/1220mm
Suspension (front/rear)	Double unequal length A-Arm. Pull rod actuated horizontally oriented spring and damper/Double unequal length A-Arm. Pull rod actuated horizontally oriented spring and damper
Tires (front/rear)	18x7.5-10 R25B Hoosier slicks/19.5x6.5-10 Hoosier wets
Wheels (front/rear)	7.5 inch wide, 3 pc Al Rim, custom Al center/7.5 inch wide, 3 pc Al Rim, custom Al center
Brake System	Floating, Cast Iron, hub mounted, 180mm dia. Drilled ISR rotors, 4xISR 22-048 OB four piston caliper
Frame Construction	Two piece carbon fiber monocoque
Engine	2008 Yamaha WR450
Bore/stroke/cylinders/cc	95mm bore/63mm stroke /1 cylinder/ 449 cc
Fuel system	Student designed/built fuel injection system using Keihin 550cc/min injectors and Haltech E6X ECU
Max power RPM/Max Torque RPM	9000rpm/7500rpm
Drive Type	DID ERV 520 chain
Differential	Drexler LSD - Formula student

=== UoP3Evo (Year: 2011-2012) ===
After receiving encouraging feedback from judges in previous years' competitions, the 18 members of the team improved the UoP3 chassis construction, while redesigning the suspension system to reduce compliances. The powertrain sub-system was retained, albeit with a revised differential mount and exhaust system. The result was a slightly heavier car but way more reliable. UoP3Evo successfully participated in Formula Student Germany held in Hockenheimring and in Formula SAE Italy held in Autodromo Riccardo Paletti, finishing in all dynamic events that year, rendering the best results the team had this far.

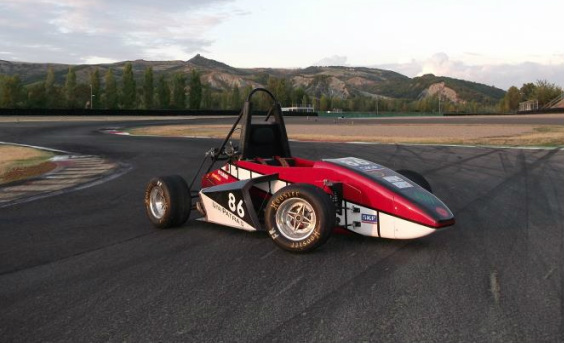
The upgraded UoP3Evo (year:2011)

Characteristics	Specifications
Length/Width/Height/Wheelbase	2670mm / 1431mm / 1146mm / 1650mm
Track (front/rear)	1240mm/1220mm
Weight including 68 kg driver (front/rear)	122 kg / 126 kg
Suspension (front/rear)	Double unequal length A-Arm. Pull rod actuated horizontally oriented spring and damper/Double unequal length A-Arm. Pull rod actuated horizontally oriented spring and damper
Tires (front/rear)	18x7.5-10 R25B Hoosier slicks/19.5x6.5-10 Hoosier wets
Wheels (front/rear)	7.5 inch wide, 3 pc Al Rim, custom Al center/7.5 inch wide, 3 pc Al Rim, custom Al center
Brake System	Floating, Cast Iron, hub mounted, 180mm dia. Drilled ISR rotors, 4xISR 22-048 OB four piston caliper
Frame Construction	Two piece carbon fiber monocoque
Engine	2008 Yamaha WR450
Bore/stroke/cylinders/cc	95mm bore/63mm stroke /1 cylinder/ 449 cc
Fuel	98 octane unleaded gasoline
Fuel system	Student designed/built fuel injection system using Keihin 550cc/min injectors and Haltech E6X ECU
Max power RPM/Max Torque RPM	9000rpm/7500rpm
Drive Type	DID ERV 520 chain
Differential	Drexler LSD - Formula student

=== UoP4e (Year: 2012-2014) ===
After 10 years of participating in Formula Student competitions, marking the beginning of the “electric car era” for the team. Trying to keep up with the trend of the future, the team's 4th racecar is not only the team's first electric-powered racecar, but also the first Formula Student type racecar with an electric motor manufactured in Greece. UoP4e incorporates all knowledge and experience from the three previous UoP Formula Student racecars, namely a carbon fiber monocoque chassis and 10” wheels. The car's highlight is probably the drivetrain/powertrain sub-system. In regards to the transmission, electric motor and accumulator, the team had these three words on their mind during the car's development phase: Functionality - Durability - Lightweight. UoP4e has more complex geometry than the previous cars, but its ergonomically focused design and increased stiffness give confidence for the construction of a high performance car. A single electric motor, directly driving a differential without the use of a gearbox was promoted for its simplicity, reliability, and ease-of-maintenance. In 2013, UoP4e received an aerodynamics package. The benefit of a well-developed aerodynamic package was evident early in the development process. In the end, the car turned out to be an amazing performer, being by far the fastest and most successful car of the team so far, finishing in 5th place overall in Formula Student UK electric class and winning the Formula Student Czech Republic competition.

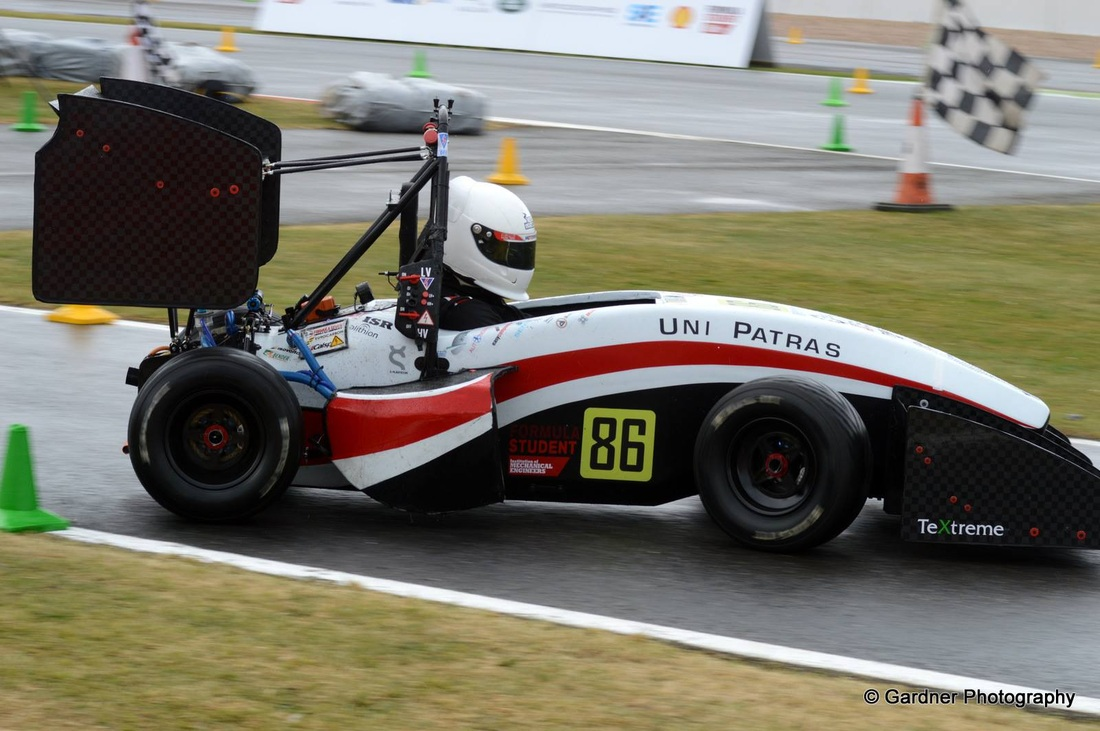
The first ever all electric Formula Style racecar build by a Greek Team, UoP4e (year:2012-2014)

Characteristics	Specifications
Length/Width/Height/Wheelbase	3042mm/1430mm /1135mm /1600mm
Track (front/rear)	1240mm/1220mm
Weight including 68 kg driver (front/rear)	136 kg/167 kg
Suspension (front/rear)	Double unequal length A-Arm, Pull rod (front)/Push rod (rear)
Tires (front/rear)	457.2 x 190.5-254 Hoosier R25B
Wheels (front/rear)	254mm wide, 2pc aluminum rims
Brakes (front/rear)	Cast Iron, hub mounted, 180 mm dia. Drilled rotors with ISR 4 piston calipers
Chassis Construction	Two piece carbon fiber monocoque
Engine	YASA-750 [YASA Oxford Motors]
Power output/Torque output	85 kW/750Nm
Transmission	Direct transmission
Differential	Drexler FSAE LSD

=== UoP5e (Year: 2015-2016) ===
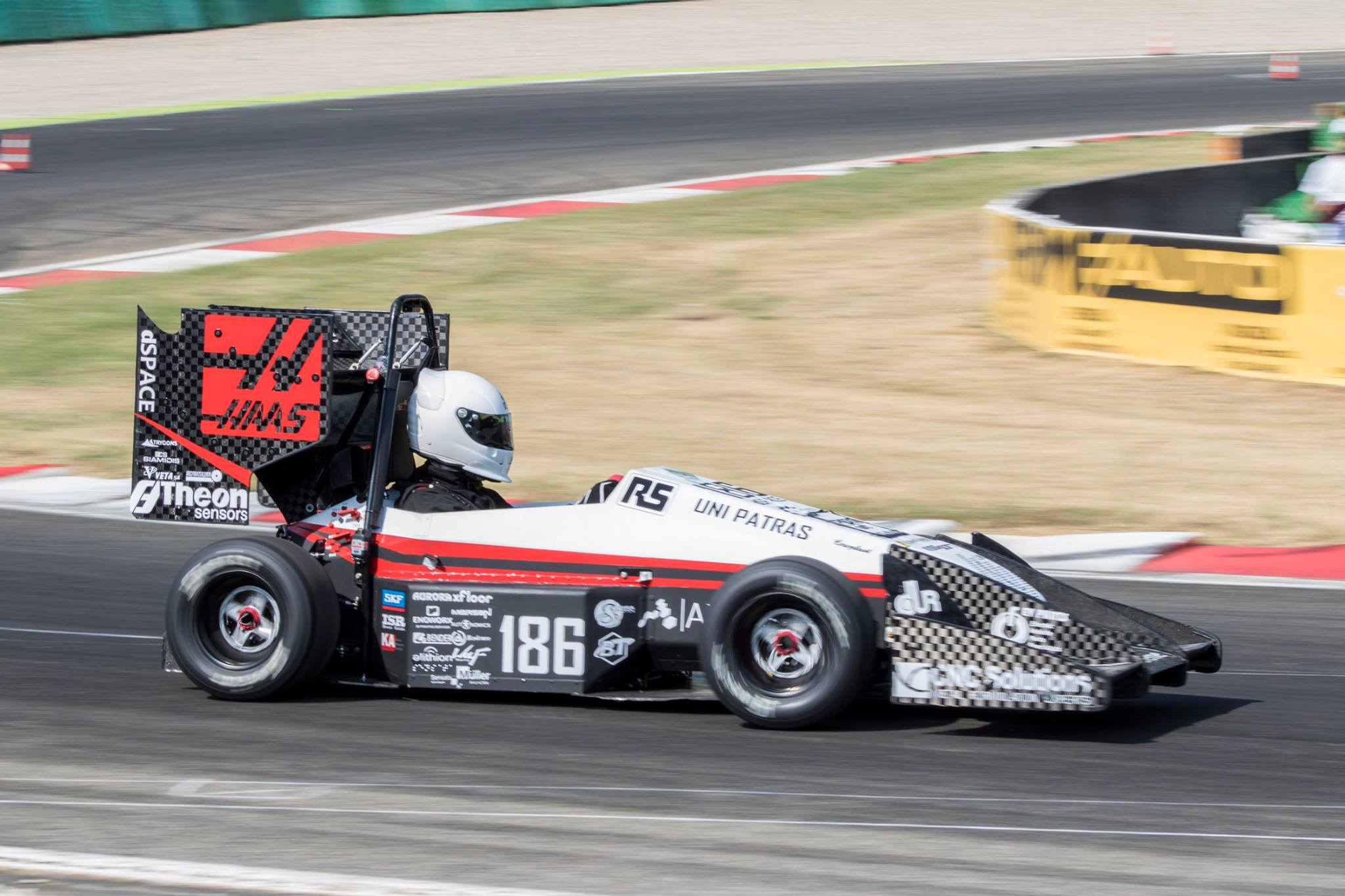
UoP5e, the team's second electric FS racecar at Formula SAE Italy 2016.

The team's fifth racecar marked yet a new chapter in the team's approach to the development of an FS racecar. The car was competitive during the dynamic events of FSAE Italy 2016 and FS Czech Republic 2016. In addition, the resource efficient design and manufacturing helped the team secure the 1st place in the Cost & Manufacturing static event in both aforementioned competitions, an achievement only a few Formula Student teams have accomplished.

Characteristics	Specifications
Length/Width/Height/Wheelbase (mm)	2900/1316/1145/1600
Track (front/rear) (mm)	1165/1095
Weight (kg)	210
Tires	18.0x7.5-10 Hoosier R25B slicks/18.0 x 6.0-10 Hoosier intermediates
Wheels	7x10", 3 piece spun aluminum rim with self-designed AL7075 center, single-lug, 46mm offset
Suspension	Double unequal length carbon fiber A-arms with direct acting Ohlins damper attached to the lower A-arm
Brake rotors (front/rear)	Floating, Cast Iron, hub mounted, 180mm outer diam., 5 mm thick, drilled / Floating, Cast Iron, hub mounted, 180mm outer diam., 4 mm thick, drilled
Brake calipers (front/rear)	ISR 22-048 OB four piston, 25mm piston dia., radial mount / ISR 22-049 two piston, 25mm piston dia., radial mount
Chassis	5-piece aluminum panel monocoque
Motor	ENSTROJ/EMRAX 228 HV LC
Power/Torque	100 kW at 5000 RPM (limited to 80 kW) / 240Nm for 30 seconds
Transmission	Direct transmission
Differential	Drexler Limited Slip Differential

=== UoP5Evo (Year:2016-2017) ===
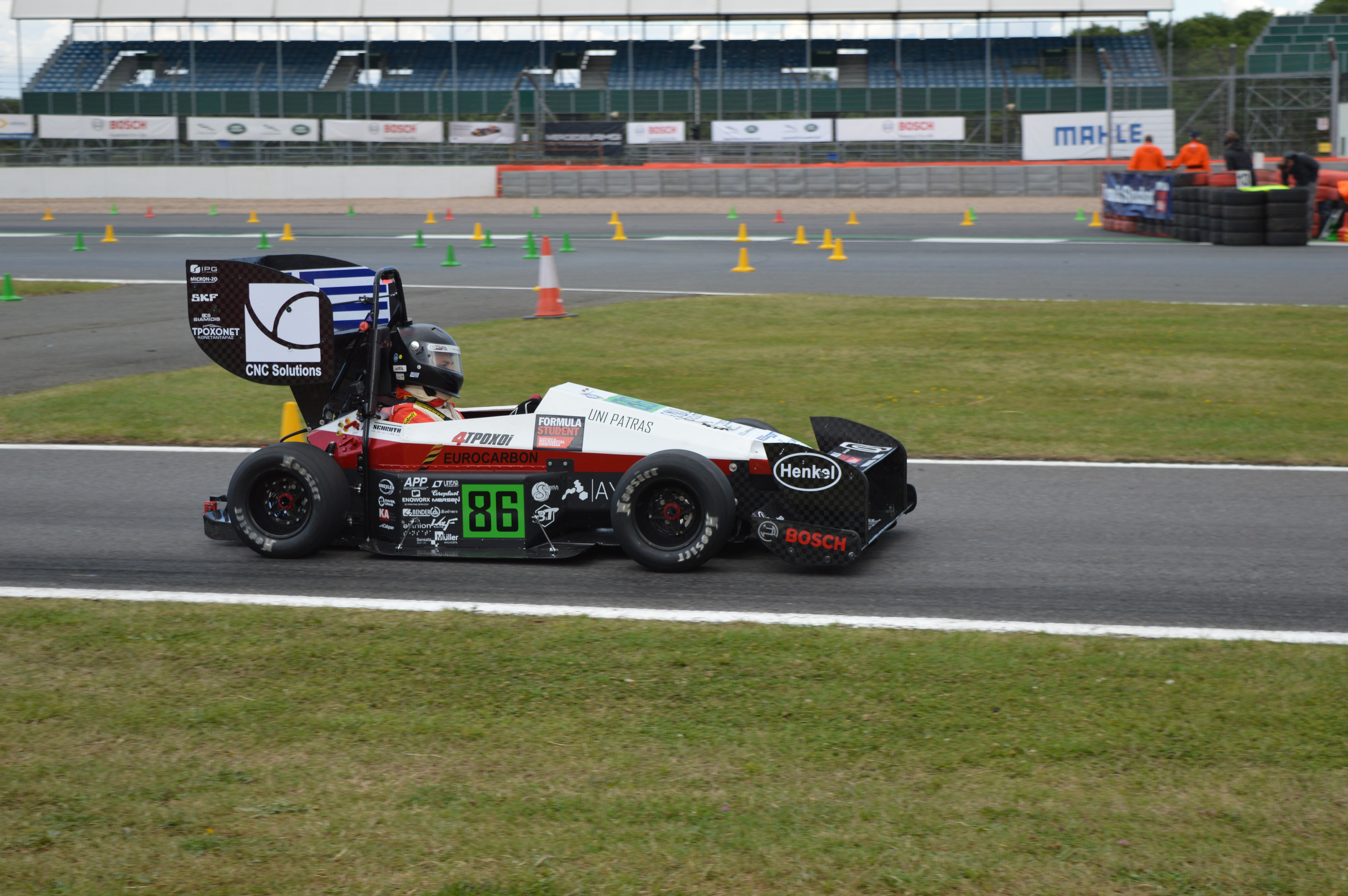
UoP5Evo conquering the Silverstone Circuit!Formula Student UK 2017 Competition

UoP5evo was an upgrade on almost every aspect in comparison to the UoP5e. The chassis was constructed using the cut and fold technique, with honeycomb aluminum panels. The results were superior mechanical properties and better weight to stiffness ratio. Furthermore, even more improved ergonomics were achieved, while also a higher safety of the driver. In terms of aero, it was redesigned from scratch. The front wing was made shorter, and the back wing consisted of two instead of four elements. Moreover, the undertray was chosen to be more aggressive and efficient. Finally, the side foils were abandoned for a nose cone foil able to balance the front and rear wings. At last the electronics were completely redesigned too. The use of lower capacity batteries was managed by opting for higher voltage. In addition, we used the CAN-bus notes leading to simplified wiring. The lower capacity batteries and the unified wiring harness led to a decrease in the overall weight of our car. The UoP5evo carried on the success of its predecessor by securing the 1st place in the Efficiency Dynamic Event and the 3rd place in the Cost Event and the 1st place among the electric racecars, during the FSUK 2017 competition, in addition to being competitive during the FSG 2017 competition.

Characteristics	Specifications
Length/Width/Height/Wheelbase (mm)	2900/1316/1145/1600
Track (front/rear) (mm)	1168/1100
Weight (kg)	208,5
Tires	18.0x7.5-10 Hoosier R25B slicks/18.0 x 6.0-10 Hoosier intermediates
Wheels	7.5x10", 3 piece aluminum rim with self-designed AL7075 center, single-lug
Suspension	Double unequal length carbon fiber A-arms with direct acting Ohlins damper attached to the lower A-Arm
Brake rotors (front/rear)	Floating, Cast Iron, hub mounted, 180mm outer diam., 5 mm thick, drilled / Floating, Cast Iron, hub mounted, 180mm outer diam., 4 mm thick, drilled
Brake calipers (front/rear)	ISR 22-048 OB four piston, 25mm piston dia., radial mount / ISR 22-049 two piston, 25mm piston dia., radial mount
Chassis	5-piece aluminium panel monocoque
Motor	ENSTROJ/EMRAX 228 HV LC
Battery Pack Energy	7,1 kWh at Nominal Voltage
Power/Torque	100 kW at 5500 RPM (limited at 80 kW)/240 Nm for 30 seconds
Transmission	Student Designed Two-Stage Gearbox
Differential	Drexler Limited Slip Differential

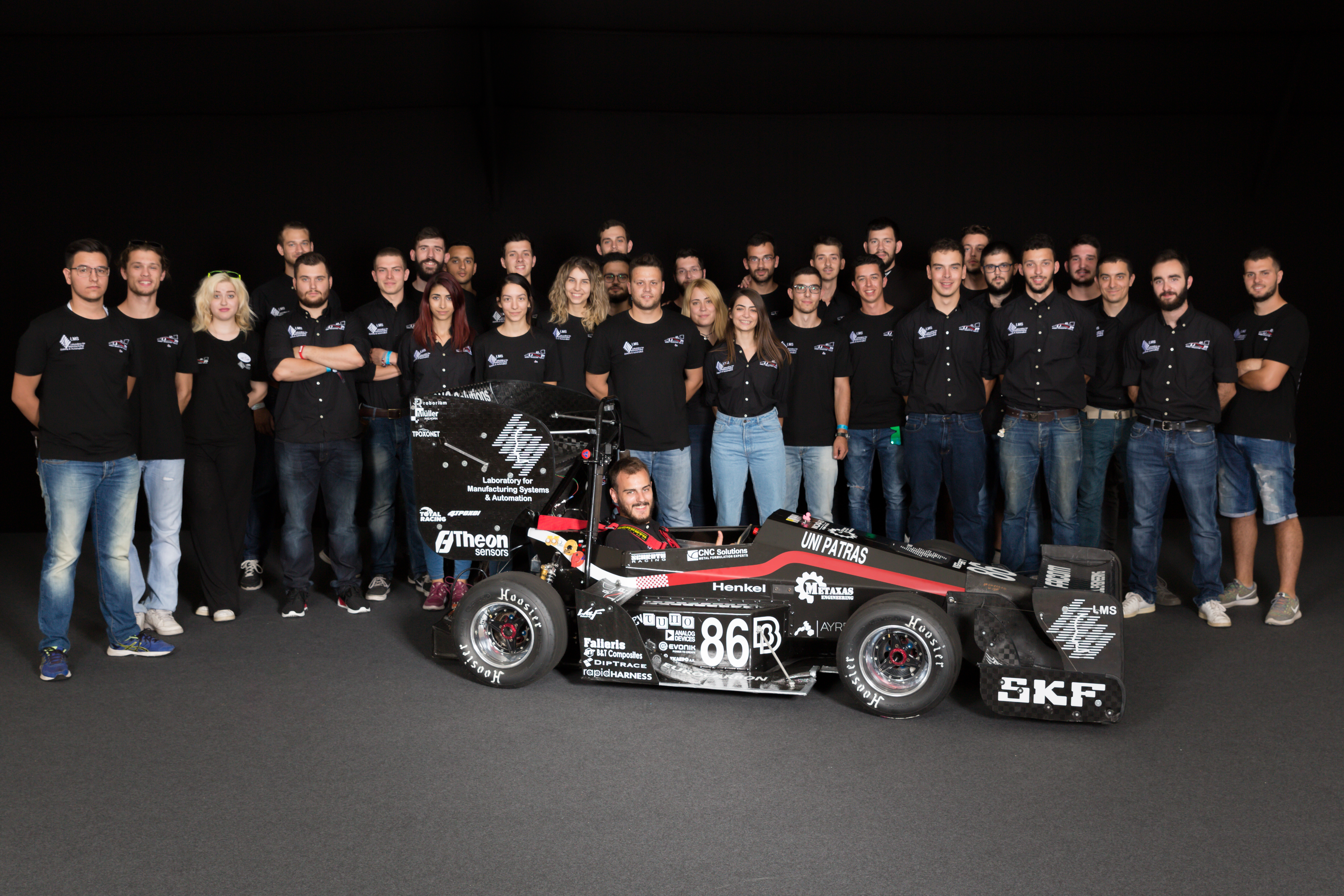
Formula Student Germany 2018 Participation

=== UoP6e (Year:2017-2018) ===
UoP6e was based on the competitive UoP5evo. The chassis was constructed using the same materials as UoP5evo but with more efficient techniques in order to make the process faster and achieving a higher quality at the finished product. Furthermore, changes were done at the back of the chassis in order to simplify the geometry and thus achieve better internal packaging. In terms of aero, the philosophy with a nosecone airfoil was kept while introducing a more an effective diffuser which works better with the new bigger (due to the increase of the rear track) rear wing into which DRS was introduced. Regarding the drivetrain, the same motor EMRAX 228 was used and the same two stages gearbox as UoP5evo. At last, at the electronics lower capacity batteries was managed by opting for higher voltage. In addition, the use of CAN-bus notes was maintained for a simplified wiring. The UoP6e participated in the Formula Student Germany 2018 Competition and conquered the 21st place among the most competitive contestants of the world.

Characteristics	Specifications
Length/Width/Height/Wheelbase (mm)	2845/1396/1170/1580
Track (front/rear) (mm)	1160/1160
Weight (kg)	215,5
Tires	18.0x7.0-10 Hoosier R25B slicks/18.0 x 6.0-10, Hoosier intermediates
Wheels	7.0x10", 3 piece aluminum rim with self-designed AL7075 center, single-lug
Suspension	Double unequal length carbon fiber A-arms with direct acting, Ohlins damper attached to the lower A-Arm
Brake rotors (front/rear)	Floating, Cast Iron, hub mounted, 180mm outer diam., 5 mm thick (front), 4 mm thick (rear)
Brake calipers (front/rear)	ISR 22-048 OB four piston, 25mm piston dia., radial mount / ISR 22-049 two piston, 25mm piston dia., radial mount
Chassis	5-piece aluminium panel monocoque
Motor	ENSTROJ/EMRAX 228 HV LC
Battery Pack Energy	7,1 kWh at Nominal Voltage
Power/Torque	100 kW at 5500 RPM (limited at 80 kW)/240 Nm, for 30 seconds
Transmission	Student Designed Two-Stage Gearbox
Differential	Drexler Limited Slip Differential

== Participations and awards ==
Season	Competition	Car	Result
2018	Formula Student Germany	UoP6e	21st Place Overall
2017	Formula Student Germany	UoP5Evo	28th Place Overall
2017	Formula Student UK (Class 1)	UoP5Evo	10th Place Overall
2017	Formula Student UK (Class 1)	UoP5Evo	3rd Place Cost Event
2017	Formula Student UK (Class 1)	UoP5Evo	1st place Efficiency Dynamic Event
2016	Formula Student Czech Republic	UoP5e	7th place overall
2016	Formula Student Czech Republic	UoP5e	1st place Cost Event
2016	Formula Student Italy ATA	UoP5e	1st place Cost Event
2016	Formula Student Italy ATA	UoP5e	8th place overall
2014	Formula Student Czech Republic	UoP4e	1st place Business Plan
2014	Formula Student Czech Republic	UoP4e	1st place Acceleration
2014	Formula Student Czech Republic	UoP4e	1st place Skidpad
2014	Formula Student Czech Republic	UoP4e	1st place autoX
2014	Formula Student Czech Republic	UoP4e	1st place Endurance
2014	Formula Student Czech Republic	UoP4e	1st place overall
2014	Formula Student UK (Class 1)	UoP4e	15th place overall
2014	Formula Student UK (Class 1)	UoP4e	5th place amongst electric racecars
2014	Formula Student UK (Class 2)	UoP5e(designs)	1st place Business plan
2014	Formula Student UK (Class 2)	UoP5e (designs)	6th place overall
2013	Formula Student Electric	UoP4e	29th place overall
2013	Formula Student Italy ATA	UoP4e	16th place overall
2011	Formula Student Germany	UoP3Evo	60th place overall
2011	Formula Student Italy ATA	UoP3Evo	31st place overall
2010	FSAE Michigan	UoP3	80th place overall
2010	Formula Student UK (Class 2)	UoP4(IC)	8th place overall
2009	Formula Student UK (Class 3)	UoP4 (IC)	6th place overall
2008	Formula Student UK (Class 1 200)	UoP2Evo	2nd place Design Event
2008	Formula Student UK (Class 1 200)	UoP2Evo	4th place overall
2008	Formula Student Germany (class 1)	UoP2Evo	70th place overall
2007	Formula Student UK (Class 3)	UoP3	1st place Cost Event
2007	Formula Student UK (Class 3)	UoP3	3rd place overall
2007	Formula Student UK (Class 1)	UoP2	50th place overall
2006	Formula Student UK (Class 2)	UoP2	Autodesk Design Award winner
2006	Formula Student UK (Class 2)	UoP2	1st place overall
2005	Formula Student UK (Class 3)	UoP2	6th place overall
2003	Formula Student UK (Class 2)	UoP1	IMechE Design Award winner
2003	Formula Student UK (Class 2)	UoP1	1st place overall
2002	Formula Student UK (Class 3)	UoP1	4th place overall
