= Formula Student =

UK student engineering competition

- Frequency: Annually
- Location: Worldwide
- Country: United Kingdom
- Won by Edith Cowan University Racing

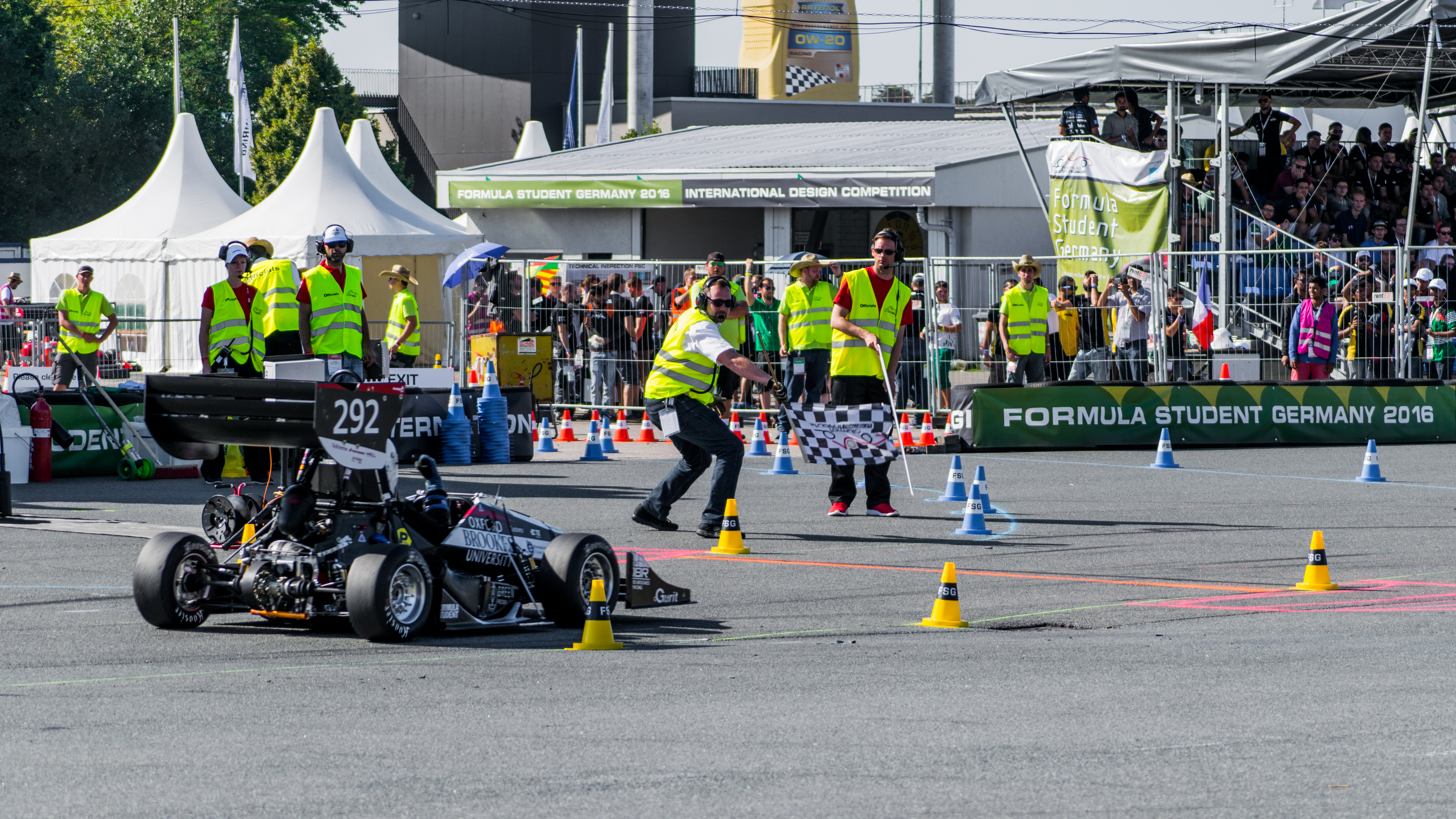
Oxford Brookes Racing finishing endurance at Formula Student Germany 2016.

Formula Student is a student engineering competition held annually. Student teams from around the world design, build, test, and race a small-scale formula style racing car. The cars are judged on a number of criteria. It is run by the Institution of Mechanical Engineers and uses the same rules as the original Formula SAE with supplementary regulations.

== Class definitions ==
There are three entry classes in Formula Student, designed to allow progressive learning.

=== Formula Student Class (formerly Class 1) ===
This is the main event, where teams compete with the cars they have designed and built. Teams are judged across six categories and must pass an inspection by judges before being allowed to compete for the dynamic events. There are usually 100–120 teams in this class.

=== Concept Class (formerly Class 2) ===
This is a concept class for teams who only have a project and plan for a Class 1 car. It can include any parts or work that has been completed in the project so far but this is not necessary. Teams are judged on business presentation, cost and design. Schools can enter both FS Class and Concept Class cars, allowing Concept Class to be used for inexperienced students to practise their development in advance of a full Formula Student Class entry.

=== FS-AI ===
In 2019 the FS-AI class was introduced for driverless cars.

=== Class 1A (pre-2012) ===
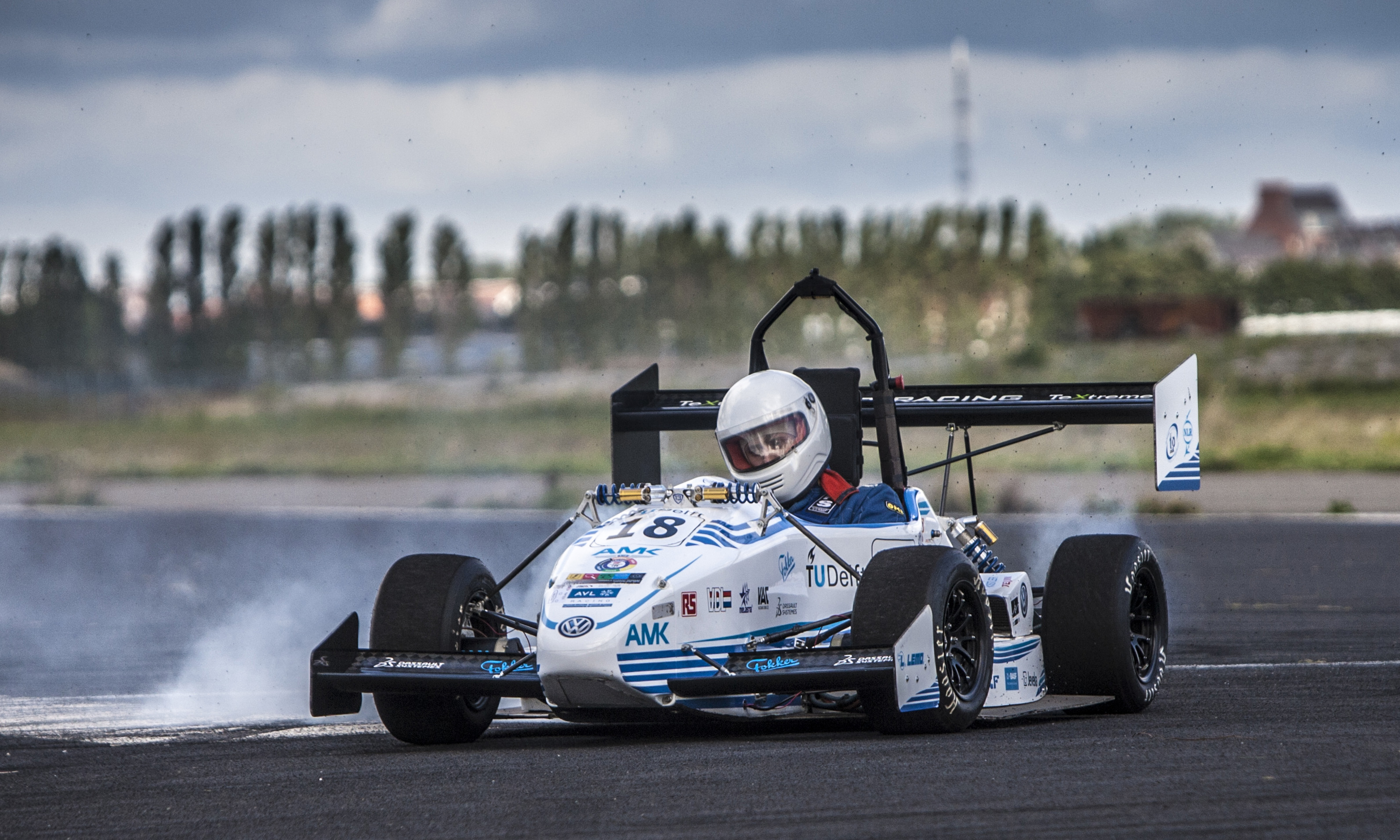
The 13th car of DUT Racing, the Formula Student team from the Delft University of Technology

This was an alternative fueled class with the emphasis placed upon the environmental impact of racing. A car from the previous year's Class 1 entry could be re-entered and re-engineered allowing the students to concentrate on the low carbon aspect of the competition without having to redesign a new chassis and ancillaries. Cars in Class 1A were judged in the same events alongside Class 1 however the cost category was replaced by one for sustainability and the endurance event had a greater emphasis placed upon measured emissions. Class 1A cars were scored and ranked independently of Class 1. Since 2012, both Petroleum and Alternative fueled cars have competed for places in the same rankings.

=== Class 2A (pre-2012) ===
This was a concept class for teams who only had a project and plan for a Class 1A car. It could include any physical parts or work that had been completed for the project so far, but was not essential. Teams were judged on business presentation, cost and design. Schools could enter both Class 1A and Class 2A teams, with Class 2A allowing inexperienced students to gain competition experience in preparation for a full Class 1A entry.

== History ==
The first event was held at the Motor Industry Research Association (MIRA) proving ground in 1998. Following that, the event was held for three years at the NEC Birmingham between 1999 and 2001. The event was then held on the Go-Kart track at Bruntingthorpe Aerodrome between 2002 and 2006, before moving to Silverstone Circuit in 2007 where the competition remains until this day. The dynamic events have taken place on Luffield and Brooklands corners in the past but 2012 saw Copse corner and the National Circuit pit straight being used.

Formula Student partnered with Racing Pride in 2019 to support greater inclusivity across the British motorsport industry for LGBT+ fans, employees and drivers.

The FS-AI class enabling driverless cars began in 2019.

== Winners ==
Year	Location	Class 1	Points	Best UK team	Points (position)	Class 1–200	Class 3	Class 1a	
1998	MIRA	(United States) UT Arlington		University of Birmingham		n/a	n/a	n/a	
1999	NEC Birmingham	(United States) Rochester IT		Leeds University		n/a	(Slovenia) University of Maribor	n/a	
2000	NEC Birmingham	(United States) CSU Pomona		University of Hertfordshire		n/a	(United Kingdom) University of Huddersfield	n/a	
2001	NEC Birmingham	(United States) Georgia Tech	913	Leeds University	891 (3)	(United Kingdom) University of Birmingham	(United Kingdom) University of Bath	n/a	
2002	Bruntingthorpe	(United States) Georgia Tech	936	Brunel University	728 (4)	(United Kingdom) University of Hertfordshire	(Italy) University of Florence	n/a	
2003	Bruntingthorpe	(Canada) University of Toronto	885	Oxford Brookes University	477 (5)	(Finland) Helsinki Polytechnic Stadia	(United Kingdom) Swansea University	n/a	
2004	Bruntingthorpe	(Australia) RMIT University	907	Oxford Brookes University	601 (7)	(Germany) UAS Stralsund	(United Kingdom) University of Bath	n/a	
2005	Bruntingthorpe	(Canada) University of Toronto	884	University of Hertfordshire	764 (7)	(United Kingdom) Swansea University	(United Kingdom) University of Bath	n/a	
2006	Bruntingthorpe	(Canada) University of Toronto	844	Oxford Brookes University	802 (3)	(United Kingdom) University of Hertfordshire	(Portugal) Instituto Superior Técnico	n/a	
2007	Silverstone	(Australia) RMIT University	925	University of Bath	785 (6)	(United Kingdom) University of Hertfordshire	(United Kingdom) University of Hertfordshire	n/a	
2008	Silverstone	(Germany) University of Stuttgart	896	University of Bath	691 (4)	(United Kingdom) University of Hertfordshire	(Netherlands) TU Eindhoven	(United Kingdom) University of Hertfordshire	
2009	Silverstone	(Germany) University of Stuttgart	792	University of Bath	715 (4)	(Germany) TU Munich	(Iran) Isfahan UT	(United Kingdom) University of Hertfordshire	
2010	Silverstone	(Germany) TU Munich	848	University of Hertfordshire	716 (5)	n/a	(Portugal) Instituto Superior Técnico	(Switzerland) ETH Zurich	
Year	Location	Class 1	Points	Best UK team	Points (position)	Class 1a	Class 2	Class 2a	
2011	Silverstone	(Germany) University of Stuttgart	872	University of Hertfordshire	729 (3)	(Netherlands) TU Delft (910 points)	(United Kingdom) University of Bath	(United Kingdom) University of Warwick	
Year	Location	Class 1	Points	Best UK team	Points (position)	Dynamic Events Winner	Endurance Event Winner	Static Events Winner	Class 2
2012	Silverstone	(Sweden) Chalmers UT	850	Oxford Brookes University	719 (7)	(Germany) TU Munich	(Sweden) Chalmers UT	(Australia) Monash University	(Portugal) Instituto Superior Técnico
2013	Silverstone	(Switzerland) ETH Zurich	921	University of Huddersfield	503 (15)	(Switzerland) ETH Zurich	(Switzerland) ETH Zurich	(Switzerland) ETH Zurich	(United Kingdom) Imperial College London
2014	Silverstone	(Netherlands) TU Delft	855	Oxford Brookes University	733 (6)	(Netherlands) TU Delft	(Germany) University of Stuttgart	(Germany) University of Stuttgart	(Netherlands) TU Eindhoven
2015	Silverstone	(Netherlands) TU Delft	909	University of Bath	748 (4)	(Netherlands) TU Delft	(United Kingdom) University of Bath	(Germany) University of Stuttgart	(United Kingdom) University of Bath
2016	Silverstone	(Germany) University of Stuttgart	851	University of Bath	708 (4)	(Germany) University of Stuttgart	(Germany) University of Stuttgart	(Switzerland) ETH Zurich	(Italy) University of Rome
2017	Silverstone	(United Kingdom) Cardiff University	855	Cardiff University	855 (1)	(United Kingdom) University of Birmingham	(United Kingdom) University of Birmingham	(United Kingdom) Cardiff University	(United Kingdom) University of Bath
2018	Silverstone	(Australia) Monash University	864	Oxford Brookes University	772 (2)	(Australia) Monash University	(Australia) Monash University	(United Kingdom) University of Bath	(United Kingdom) University of Bath
2019	Silverstone	(Italy) Uni MoRE	873	Oxford Brookes University	754 (2)	(Germany) UAS Zwickau	(Italy) Uni MoRE	(Italy) Uni MoRE	(United Kingdom) University of Portsmouth
2020	not held								
2021	Silverstone	(United Kingdom) University of Sheffield	753.9	University of Sheffield	753.9 (1)	(United Kingdom) University of Central Lancashire	(United Kingdom) University of Sheffield	(United Kingdom) University of Sheffield	(India) Indian Institute of Technology Bombay
2022	Silverstone	(Scotland) University of Glasgow	792.9	University of Glasgow	792.9 (1)	(Scotland) University of Glasgow	University of Malta	(United Kingdom) University of Southampton	(Portugal) University of Porto
2023	Silverstone	(Italy) Uni MoRE	834.6	Staffordshire University	719.4 (2)	(Italy) Uni MoRE	(Italy) Uni MoRE	(United Kingdom) Oxford Brookes University	(Egypt) Ain Shams University
2024	Silverstone	(Australia) Edith Cowan University	915.2	Cardiff University	714.8 (2)	(Australia) Edith Cowan University	(Australia) Edith Cowan University	(Scotland) University of Glasgow	(Scotland) University of Glasgow
2025	Silverstone	(Spain) University of the Basque Country	908.3	Oxford Brookes University	810.8 (3)	(Spain) University of the Basque Country	(United Kingdom) University of Birmingham	Technical University Denmark	(Mexico) ITESM
2026	Silverstone	(Australia) Edith Cowan University	880.3	University of Birmingham	746.7 (3)	(Italy) Uni MoRE	(Italy) Uni MoRE	(United Kingdom) Oxford Brookes University	(United Kingdom) University of Liverpool

=== Most wins ===
Team	Class 1 wins
(Germany) University of Stuttgart	4
(Canada) University of Toronto	3
(United States) Georgia Tech	2
(Australia) RMIT University	2
(Netherlands) TU Delft	2
(Italy) Uni MoRE	2
(Australia) Edith Cowan University	2
(United Kingdom) Cardiff University	1
(Sweden) Chalmers UT	1
(United States) CSU Pomona	1
(Switzerland) ETH Zurich	1
(Australia) Monash University	1
(United States) Rochester IT	1
(Germany) TU Munich	1
(United Kingdom) University of Glasgow	1
(United Kingdom) University of Sheffield	1
(Spain) University of the Basque Country	1
(United States) UT Arlington	1

== See also ==
- Formula SAE
- Formula SAE Australasia
- IIT Bombay Racing
- University of Patras Formula Student Team - UoP Racing Team
- ETSEIB Motorsport
