= UH Racing =

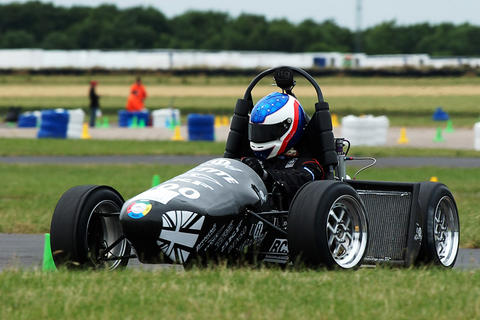
UH Racing at FSUK 2006

UH Racing is a Formula Student team run by students attending the University of Hertfordshire, ranked 8th EV team in the UK and 120th EV team in the world as of 17 December 2023. UH Racing's peak international ranking was 7th, achieved in 2010.

The team entered the inaugural Formula Student competition hosted in the United Kingdom in 1998, at the MIRA proving ground.

The team has entered at least one vehicle in every subsequent Formula Student UK competition, with the exception of 2021. Additionally, UH Racing has travelled abroad to enter other Formula Student events, such as Formula Student Germany, Formula Student Italy, and Formula Student Netherlands.

UH Racing has often been at the forefront of FS innovation, being the first UK team to compete with an electric vehicle with UH12A in 2009. In 2020, the decision to return to electric powertrain was made, and the team is now exclusively EV.

== UH Racing at Formula Student UK ==
UH Racing Entries at FSUK
Year	Location	Chassis	Static Events				Dynamic Events					Overall Results	
Year	Location	Chassis	Cost	Business	Design	LTS*	Acceleration	Skidpad	Autocross	Endurance	Efficiency	Points	Position
1998	MIRA	UH1	-	-	-	-	-	-	-	-	-	N/A	N/A
1999	NEC Birmingham	UH2	-	-	-	-	-	-	-	-	-	N/A	7th
2000	NEC Birmingham	UH3	-	-	-	-	-	-	-	-	-	N/A	4th
2001	NEC Birmingham	UH4	21st	14th	14th	-	14th	-	11th	9th	-	431	11th
2002	Bruntingthorpe	UH5	6th	10th	6th	-	15th	-	19th	13th	-	500	14th
2003	Bruntingthorpe	UH6	17th	6th	17th	-	12th	-	17th	5th	5th	329	17th
2004	Bruntingthorpe	UH7	41st	7th	28th	-	-	-	-	-	-	201	42nd
2005	Bruntingthorpe	UH8	16th	21st	8th	-	4th	5th	22nd	5th	5th	764	7th
2006	Bruntingthorpe	UH9	4th	19th	18th	-	7th	14th	6th	6th	15th	771	5th
2007	Silverstone	UH08H	-	-	-	-	-	-	-	-	-	N/A	13th
2007	Silverstone	UH10	21st	39th	14th	-	4th	23rd	5th	10th	14th	693	8th
2008	Silverstone	UHH2	-	-	-	-	-	-	-	-	-	N/A	1st
2008	Silverstone	UH11	3rd	57th	7th	-	4th	10th	17th	-	-	409	19th
2009	Silverstone	UH12	58th	26th	16th	-	2nd	2nd	9th	27th	-	634	13th
2009	Silverstone	UH12A	-	-	-	-	-	-	-	-	-	N/A	1st
2010	Silverstone	UH13	16th	44th	16th	-	18th	8th	7th	6th	14th	716	5th
2010	Silverstone	UH13A	N/A	1st	4th	-	3rd	3rd	3rd	-	-	410	4th
2011	Silverstone	UH14	13th	1st	7th	-	28th	17th	8th	2nd	19th	729	3rd
2012	Silverstone	UH15	23rd	8th	2nd	-	13th	10th	10th	28th	-	490	15th
2013	Silverstone	UH16	3rd	42nd	10th	-	15th	5th	15th	26th	-	472	18th
2014	Silverstone	UH17	32nd	38th	28th	-	37th	38th	32nd	13th	7th	418	17th
2015	Silverstone	UH18	6th	46th	7th	-	30th	14th	20th	32nd	-	384	27th
2016	Silverstone	UH19	11th	12th	23rd	-	43rd	19th	24th	12th	14th	628	9th
2017	Silverstone	UH20	12th	11th	1st	-	10th	3rd	18th	37th	-	441	16th
2018	Silverstone	UH21	11th	49th	7th	-	6th	31st	26th	38th	-	354	25th
2019	Silverstone	UH22	13th	14th	7th	-	12th	17th	30th	5th	4th	584	8th
2020**	Silverstone	UH23	-	-	-	-	-	-	-	-	-	909.8	2nd
2022	Silverstone	UH25	5th	6th	10th	2nd	-	-	-	-	-	330.9	12th
2023	Silverstone	UH26	24th	24th	13th	20th	-	-	-	-	-	251.6	23rd
2024	Silverstone	UH27	29th	3rd	18th	16th	-	-	-	-	-	264.8	20th
2025	Silverstone	UH28	34th	43rd	15th	4th	-	-	-	-	-	231.2	27th

Data has been filled in where available, but several values are still missing.

*the Lap Time Simulation (LTS) event was first included in the FSUK competition in 2022.

**in 2020, Formula Student UK's competition format was changed temporarily due to the COVID-19 pandemic. UH Racing chose to continue the development of their vehicle into 2021, intending to compete with UH23 at FSUK 2021. Unfortunately, further delays associated with the pandemic meant the car was not ready to enter, and further development continued into 2022.

UH Racing has finished in the top three at Formula Student UK a total of three times, according to the IMechE website.

== UH Racing at international competitions ==
UH Racing at FS Australia
Year	Chassis	Points	Position
2001	UH4	562	5th

UH Racing at FSAE Michigan
Year	Chassis	Points	Position
2006	UH9	601	23rd

UH Racing at FS Germany
Year	Chassis	Points	Position
2008	UH11	835	5th
2009	UH12	814	2nd
2010	UH13	411	32nd
2011	UH14	686	7th
2012	UH15	825	6th
2013	UH16	736	10th
2014	UH17	141	64th
2015	UH18	630	7th
2016	UH19	565	14th
2017	UH20	369	27th

UH Racing at FS Czech Republic
Year	Chassis	Points	Position
2017	UH20	836	2nd
2018	UH21	378	11th

UH Racing at FS Netherlands
Year	Chassis	Points	Position
2019	UH22	626	5th

UH Racing at FS Italy
Year	Chassis	Points	Position
2019	UH22	513	12th
2022	UH25	250	14th
