= St Mary's Church, Bruntingthorpe =

Church in Bruntingthorpe, Leicestershire

Coordinates: 52°30′09″N 1°06′59″W

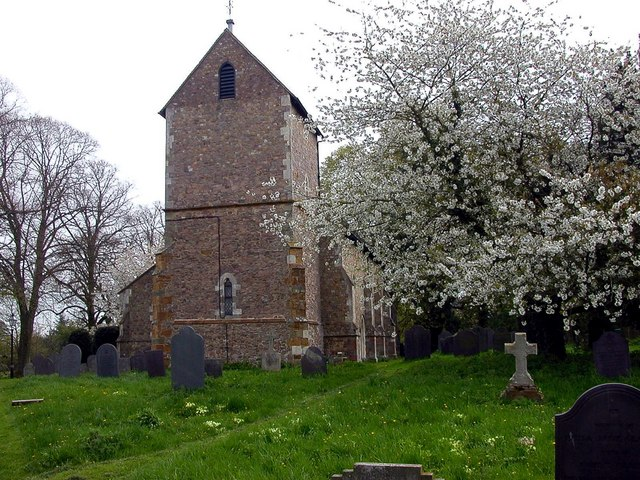
- Denomination: Church of England

History
- Dedication: St Mary

Administration
- Diocese: Leicester
- Archdeaconry: Loughborough
- Parish: Bruntingthorpe, Leicestershire

Clergy
- Rector: Liz Bickley

St Mary's Church is a church in Bruntingthorpe, Leicestershire. It is a Grade II listed building.

== History ==
The church consists of a nave, north aisle, transept, chancel and tower. The tower has an unusual swithland slated roof. The church was 'razed to the foundations' in 1873 apart from the tower which was only dismantled as far as the belfry parapet.

The current church started to be built in the March of that year and the tower was restored. The font, dating from the 12th century, survives from the earlier church. The chancel's north wall has a wall painting depicting the Descent from the Cross.
