= Bruntingthorpe =

Village in Leicestershire, England

Coordinates: 52.50279°N 1.11457°W

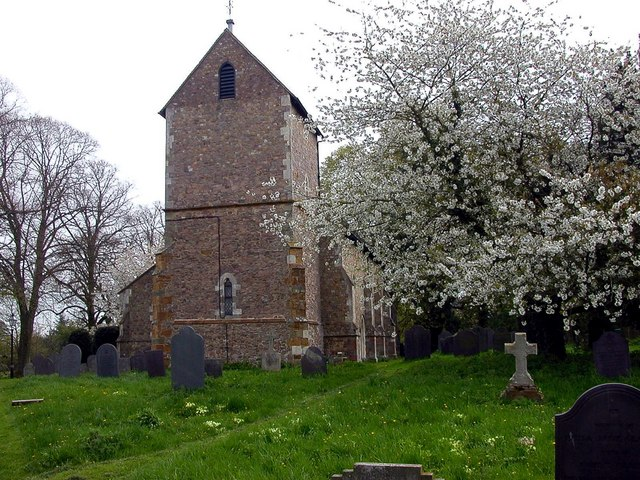
- St Mary's Church, Bruntingthorpe

- Location within Leicestershire
- Population: 425 (2011)
- District: Harborough
- Shire county: Leicestershire
- Region: East Midlands
- Country: England
- Sovereign state: United Kingdom
- Post town: Lutterworth
- Postcode district: LE17
- Police: Leicestershire
- Fire: Leicestershire
- Ambulance: East Midlands
- UK Parliament: South Leicestershire

Bruntingthorpe is a village and civil parish in the Harborough district of Leicestershire, England. According to the census in 2001, the parish had a population of 398. The parish also includes the hamlet of Upper Bruntingthorpe. Following the 2011 census, the population of the parish had increased to 425.

The former RAF Bruntingthorpe is now Bruntingthorpe Aerodrome.

== History ==
The village's name means 'outlying farm/settlement of Brenting/Branting'.

Bruntingthorpe is in the Domesday Book where it is listed amongst the lands held by Hugh de Grandmesnil for the King.
