= South Wales Aviation Museum =

- Location within Wales
- Location: Bro Tathan North, St Athan, Vale of Glamorgan, Wales
- Coordinates: 51°25′11″N 3°26′21″W
- Type: Aviation museum
- Owners: Gary Spoors & John Sparks
- Parking: Yes, on site
- Website: www.swam.online

The South Wales Aviation Museum (SWAM) is an aviation museum in Bro Tathan North, St Athan, Vale of Glamorgan, Wales on part of the former MOD St Athan. It was set up to preserve the aviation history of South Wales, UK.

== Exhibits ==
Exhibits present in the museum are as follows:

- Avro Shackleton
- BAe Hawk
- BAe Sea Harrier
- British Aerospace 146
- Beagle Terrier
- Blackburn Buccaneer
- de Havilland Sea Devon
- de Havilland Vampire
- de Havilland Canada DHC-1 Chipmunk
- English Electric Canberra
- Fairey Gannet
- Folland Gnat
- Gloster Meteor
- Hawker Hunter
- Hawker Tempest
- Handley Page Victor
- Hawker Siddeley Harrier
- Hawker Siddeley Nimrod
- Hunting Jet Provost
- Lockheed T-33 Shooting Star
- McDonnell Douglas Phantom FG.1/FGR.2
- Panavia Tornado
- Percival Pembroke
- Percival Sea Prince
- Scottish Aviation Twin Pioneer
- SEPECAT Jaguar
- Vickers VC10
- Westland Lynx
- Westland Sea King
- Westland Wessex
- Boeing 747 Upper cockpit section
- Boeing 707 Cockpit section
- Boeing 747 Upper cockpit section

== Aircraft in Restoration ==
- Sea Harrier FRS1
- English Electric Canberra
- Avro Shackleton
- Gloster Meteor
- To be demobbed Panavia Tornado GR4
- To be demobbed Panavia Tornado GR4
- Fairey Gannet
- To be added soon Conroy Skymonster

== See also ==
- List of aviation museums
