= Bruntingthorpe Aerodrome =

Private airfield in Leicestershire, England

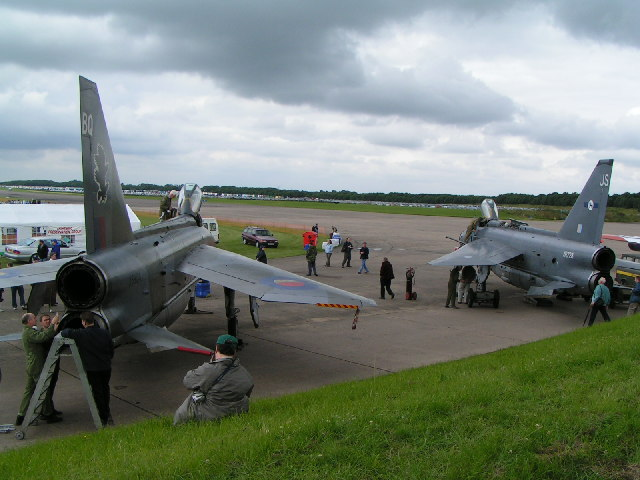
- IATA: none; ICAO: none; LID: EG74

Summary
- Airport type: Former private
- Operator: Cox Automotive
- Location: Bruntingthorpe, Leicestershire, England
- Opened: 1942
- Elevation AMSL: 467 ft (142 m)
- Coordinates: 52°29′13″N 001°07′50″W
- Website: https://www.coxauto.co.uk

Map
- Location in Leicestershire

Runways
Direction	Length		Surface
Direction	m	ft	Surface
06/24	3,000	9,843	Asphalt
06R/24L	900	2,953	Grass

Bruntingthorpe Aerodrome and Proving Ground is a privately owned former airfield near the village of Bruntingthorpe, 11 miles (18 km) to the south of Leicester, England. It was opened as RAF Bruntingthorpe in 1942.

== History ==
The aerodrome was originally RAF Bruntingthorpe and hosted both the Royal Air Force and the United States Air Force during its life. In 1973 it was sold to Chrysler Motor Corporation, which used it as a vehicle proving ground. In August 1983 it was purchased by C Walton Ltd and it continued in use as a vehicle proving ground and also provided facilities for historic aircraft storage and maintenance, air shows, corporate hospitality, exhibition space, location filming, motorcycle design and development, and vehicle storage and auctions. In 2020 it was sold to Cox Automotive for vehicle storage and auctions, with a part retained by the Walton family for aircraft activities.

== Current uses ==
Vehicles

The site can accommodate about 25,000 vehicles, parked on the former runway and taxi areas.

One Cold War-era hangar formerly housed the Manheim Bruntingthorpe Car Auction Centre.

Royal Enfield Motorcycles have established their Worldwide Technology Centre at Bruntingthorpe.

Aircraft

The most notable aircraft at the aerodrome was the Avro Vulcan XH558, which was restored to airworthy condition over eight years at a cost of about GBP 6,000,000. Its first flight was from Bruntingthorpe on 18 October 2007. The Vulcan left Bruntingthorpe at the beginning of the 2008 flying display season, was temporarily based at RAF Brize Norton as a flying base, and RAF Lyneham as its winter maintenance base. It is now grounded and based at Doncaster Sheffield Airport, Doncaster, formerly RAF Finningley 'V Bomber' base.

Bruntingthorpe houses the Cold War Jets Collection aircraft museum on the edge of the site, although due a reduction in space some aircraft have now been moved to other locations such as the South Wales Aviation Museum.

Vickers VC10 C1K XR808 "Bob" arrived at Bruntingthorpe on 29 July 2013 after retirement from the RAF and has now moved to RAF Cosford to join their museum.

In March 2013, six of the former nine RAF Lockheed TriStars were flown to the aerodrome to be stored, but have since been scrapped.

The last VC-10 to fly (ZA147) was flown to the aerodrome to be stored, but has since been scrapped.

== 1997 Boeing 747 explosion test ==
In 1997, the airfield was used by the Federal Aviation Administration of the US and the Civil Aviation Authority to conduct a test to study the effects of a terrorist planted bomb explosion on board a wide-body aircraft such as had happened over Lockerbie. The test used an ex-Air France Boeing 747-100, and four similar sized bombs were detonated at the same time, two in each underfloor luggage compartment, in opposite corners. Three of the four corners where the explosions were to take place were thoroughly protected by kevlar or titanium, but the rear left hand corner of the rear luggage compartment was deliberately left unprotected, to see what the effect would be. Many cameras were positioned inside the aircraft and round it outside, and there is a well known photograph of the rear port side of the aircraft being blown out. There was no damage elsewhere, the protective measures having completely contained the other three explosions.

Photographs of the test were later involved in a hoax, which supposedly showed an Air Canada Boeing 747 with its back half exploding on landing. The photo was, however, an edit of an Air Canada Boeing 747 landing normally with the photo of the explosion test stitched onto the back of the aircraft.

== Incidents ==
On 3 May 2009, during a "fast taxi" run, Handley Page Victor XM715 made an unplanned brief flight, reaching a height of between 20 and 30 ft before being landed. The aircraft does not have a permit to fly. The Civil Aviation Authority (CAA) stated that they would not be conducting an investigation. The causes have been identified as the co-pilot failing to reply to the command 'throttles back', thus resulting in the pilot having to control the throttles himself, resulting in a brief loss of control of the aircraft, causing it to rise. No action was to be taken by the CAA against either of the crew aboard XM715 or the operators of Bruntingthorpe Airfield.

== See also ==
- Strategic Air Command in the United Kingdom
- United States Air Forces in Europe
