= Formula SAE =

Racing car design competition

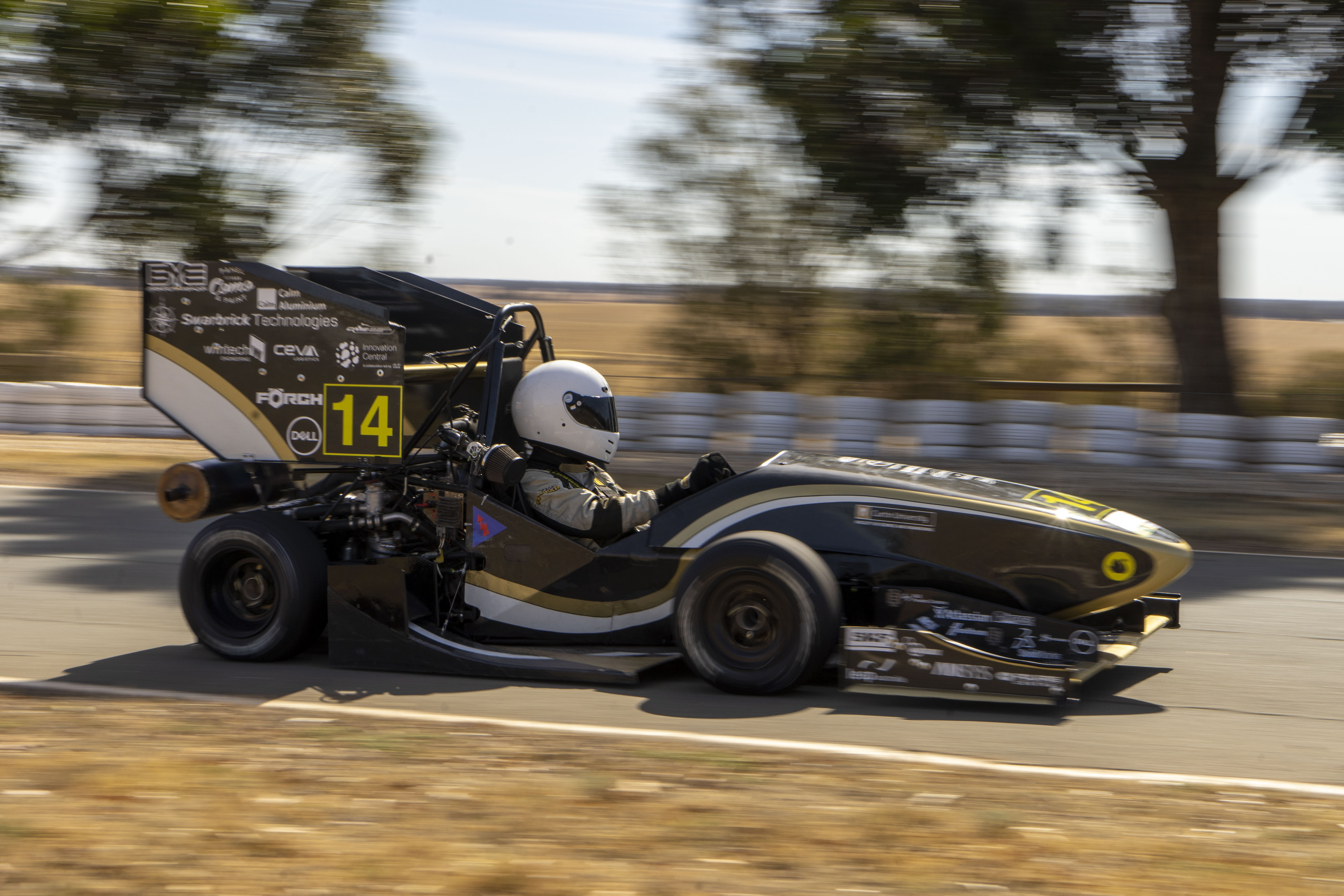
Curtin University Motorsport Team's 2019 car being tested before the 2019 Formula SAE Australasia competition.

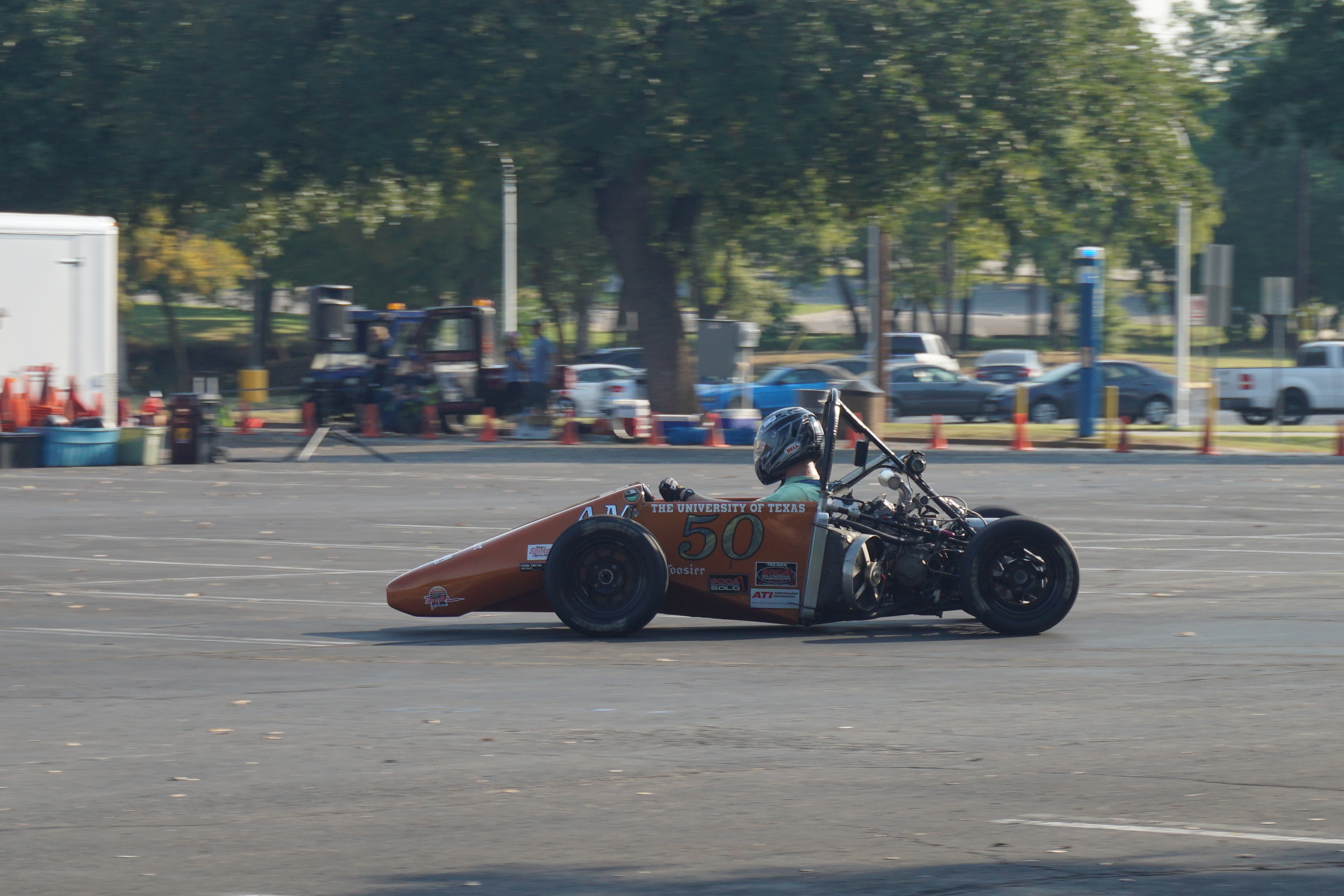
University of Texas at Austin Formula SAE car

Formula SAE is a student design competition organized by SAE International (previously known as the Society of Automotive Engineers, SAE). The competition was started in 1980 by the SAE student branch at the University of Texas at Austin after a prior asphalt racing competition proved to be unsustainable.

== Concept ==
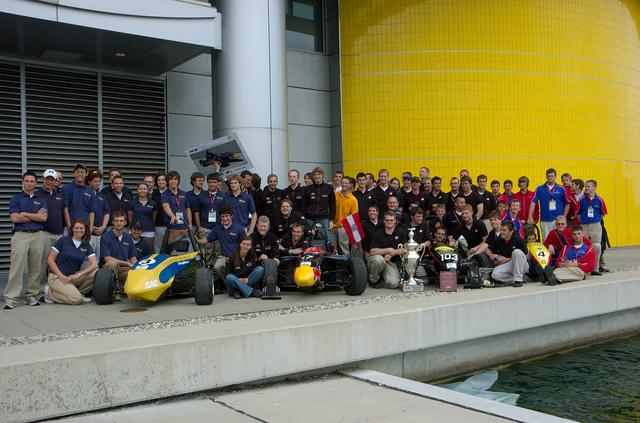
The 2007 design finalist cars; from the left, University of Michigan - Ann Arbor, TU Graz, University of Wisconsin - Madison, and Kansas. Absent is the Pennsylvania State University

The concept behind Formula SAE is that a fictional manufacturing company has contracted a student design team to develop a small Formula-style race car. The prototype race car is to be evaluated for its potential as a production item. The target marketing group for the race car is the non-professional weekend autocross racer. Each student team designs, builds and tests a prototype based on a series of rules, whose purpose is both ensuring on-track safety (the cars are driven by the students themselves) and promoting clever problem solving. There are combustion and electric divisions of the competition, primarily only differing in their rules for powertrain.

The prototype race car is judged in a number of different events. The points schedule for most Formula SAE events is:

Static Events
Design Event	150
Cost & Manufacturing Analysis Event	100
Presentation Event	75
Dynamic Events
Acceleration Event	100
Skidpad Event	75
Autocross Event	125
Fuel Economy Event	100
Endurance Event	275
Total Points Possible	1,000

In addition to these events, various sponsors of the competition provide awards for superior design accomplishments. For example, best use of E-85 ethanol fuel, innovative use of electronics, recyclability, crash worthiness, analytical approach to design, and overall dynamic performance are some of the awards available. At the beginning of the competition, the vehicle is checked for rule compliance during the Technical Inspection. Its braking ability, rollover stability and noise levels are checked before the vehicle is allowed to compete in the dynamic events (Skidpad, Autocross, Acceleration, and Endurance).

Large companies, such as General Motors, Ford, and Chrysler, can have staff interact with more than 1000 student engineers. Working in teams of anywhere between two and 30, these students have proven themselves to be capable of producing a functioning prototype vehicle.

The volunteers for the design judging include some of the racing industry's most prominent engineers and consultants including the late Carroll Smith, Bill Mitchell, Doug Milliken, Claude Rouelle, Jack Auld, John LePlante, Ron Tauranac, and Bryan Kubala.

Today, the competition has expanded and includes more than 12 events all over the world. For example, Formula Student is a similar SAE-sanctioned event in the UK, as well as Formula SAE Australasia (Formula SAE-A) taking place in Australia. The Verein Deutscher Ingenieure (VDI) holds the Formula Student Germany competition at the Hockenheimring.

In 2007, an offshoot called Formula Hybrid was inaugurated. It is similar to Formula SAE, except all cars must have gasoline-electric hybrid power plants. The competition takes place at the New Hampshire International Speedway.

In 2010, the Formula Student Electric was inaugurated, which requires the students to build a fully electrically powered racing vehicle.

In 2017, the Formula Student Driverless was inaugurated.

== Summary of rules ==
=== Student competition ===
Formula SAE has relatively few performance restrictions. The team must be made up entirely of active college students (including drivers) which places obvious restrictions on available work hours, skill sets, experience, and presents unique challenges that professional race teams do not face with a paid, skilled staff. This restriction means that the rest of the regulations can be much less restrictive than most professional series.

Students are allowed to receive advice and criticism from professional engineers or faculty, but all of the car design must be done by the students themselves. Students are also solely responsible for fundraising, though most successful teams are based on curricular programs and have university-sponsored budgets. Additionally, the points system is organized so that multiple strategies can lead to success. This leads to a great variety among cars, which is a rarity in the world of motorsports.

=== Engine (IC Competition) ===
The engine must be a four-stroke, Otto-cycle piston engine with a displacement no greater than 710cc. An air restrictor of circular cross-section must be fitted downstream of the throttle and upstream of any compressor, with a diameter no greater than 20mm for gasoline engines, forced induction or naturally aspirated, or 19mm for ethanol-fueled engines. The restrictor keeps power levels below 100 hp in the vast majority of FSAE cars. Most commonly, production four-cylinder 600cc sport bike engines are used due to their availability and displacement. However, there are many teams that use smaller V-twin and single-cylinder engines, mainly due to their weight-saving and packaging benefits. Very rarely do teams build an engine from scratch, few examples include Western Washington University's 554cc V8 entry in 2001, University of Melbourne's "WATTARD" engine in 2003–2004, and University of Auckland's V twin. In 2019, 120 student teams registered for competition, and 109 of them were found to be onsite. There was also 2567 students that participated from these teams that showed up.

=== Electric Powertrain (EV Competition) ===
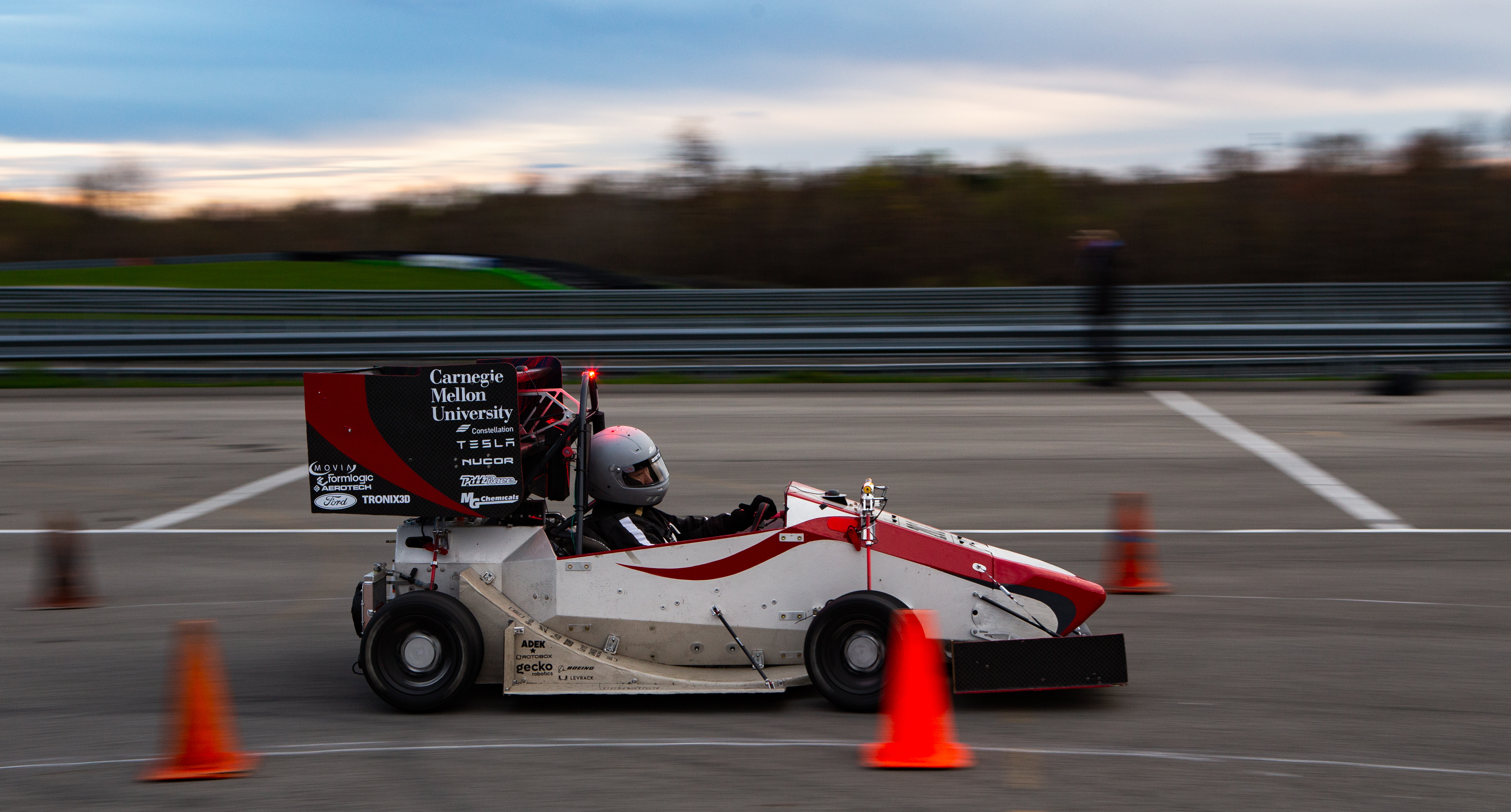
Carnegie Mellon University's Formula SAE Electric Car, 24e

The accumulator must not have a voltage greater than 600V, but does not have a capacity limit. An energy meter is installed at competition ensuring no more than 80kW are drawn. Most teams elect to use lithium-ion cells, but both lead acid cells as well as other energy storage devices such as capacitors are also permitted — this accounts for the commonly referred battery pack being referred to as an accumulator in this competition. Cell voltages and temperatures must be monitored and individual cell connected via fusible links. These challenges lead many (especially young) teams to use preconfigured cell modules that are connected together in the accumulator enclosure. The competition organizers attempt to prepare teams for competition EV technical inspection by having teams complete an Electrical Safety Form (ESF) prior to competition — this form outlines many of the parts used in the high voltage system as well as design decisions the team is making.

=== Suspension ===
The suspension is unrestricted save for safety regulations and the requirement to have 50mm total of wheel travel. Most teams opt for four-wheel independent suspension, almost universally double-wishbone. Active suspension is legal.

=== Aerodynamics ===
Complex aerodynamic packages, while not required to compete, are common among the fastest teams. With the low speeds of the FSAE competition rarely exceeding 60 mph (97 km/h), designs must be thoroughly justified in the design judging event through wind tunnel testing, computational fluid dynamics, and on track testing. Aerodynamic devices are regulated through maximum size and powered aerodynamic devices are outlawed.

=== Weight ===
There is no weight restriction. The weight of the average competitive Formula SAE car is usually less than 440 lb (200 kg) in race trim. However, the lack of weight regulation combined with the somewhat fixed power ceiling encourages teams to adopt innovative weight-saving strategies, such as the use of composite materials, elaborate and expensive machining projects, and rapid prototyping. In 2009 the fuel economy portion of the endurance event was assigned 100 of the 400 endurance points, up from 50. This rules change has marked a trend in engine downsizing in an attempt to save weight and increase fuel economy. Several top-running teams have switched from high-powered four-cylinder cars to smaller, one- or two-cylinder engines which, though they usually make much less power, allow weight savings of 75 lb (34 kg) or more, and also provide much better fuel economy. If a lightweight single-cylinder car can keep a reasonable pace in the endurance race, it can often make up the points lost in overall time to the heavier, high-powered cars by an exceptional fuel economy score.

Example: At the 2009 Formula SAE West endurance event, third-place finishers Rochester Institute of Technology completed the endurance course in 22 minutes, 45 seconds with their four-cylinder car, while fourth-place finishers Oregon State University finished in 22 minutes, 47 seconds with their single-cylinder car; this gave RIT 290.6 of 300 points for the race portion of the event and OSU 289.2 points. However, OSU used the least fuel of any car (.671 US gal (2.54 L), or 20.3 mpg_{‑US} (0.116 L/km) over the entire endurance race) and received the full 100 points for fuel economy, while RIT used 1.163 US gal (4.40 L) (11.75 mpg_{‑US} (0.2002 L/km)) and was thus only awarded 23.9 of the available points. RIT went on to win the overall competition by only 8.9 points over OSU, having scored slightly better in all of the other dynamic events.

=== Safety ===
The majority of the regulations pertain to safety. Cars must have two steel roll hoops of designated thickness and alloy, regardless of the composition of the rest of the chassis. There must be an impact attenuator in the nose, and impact testing data on this attenuator must be submitted prior to competing. Cars must also have two hydraulic brake circuits, full five-point racing harnesses, and must meet geometric templates for driver location in the cockpit for all drivers competing. Tilt-tests ensure that no fluids will spill from the car under heavy cornering, and there must be no line-of-sight between the driver and fuel, coolant, or oil lines. Electric vehicles are also fitted with a Shutdown Circuit, which is the physical electrical path the current takes that closes the main contactors of the vehicle. All safety buttons, switches, and circuits are part of the Shutdown Circuit such that removing any should make it physically impossible for high voltage to be present outside the accumulator.

== History ==
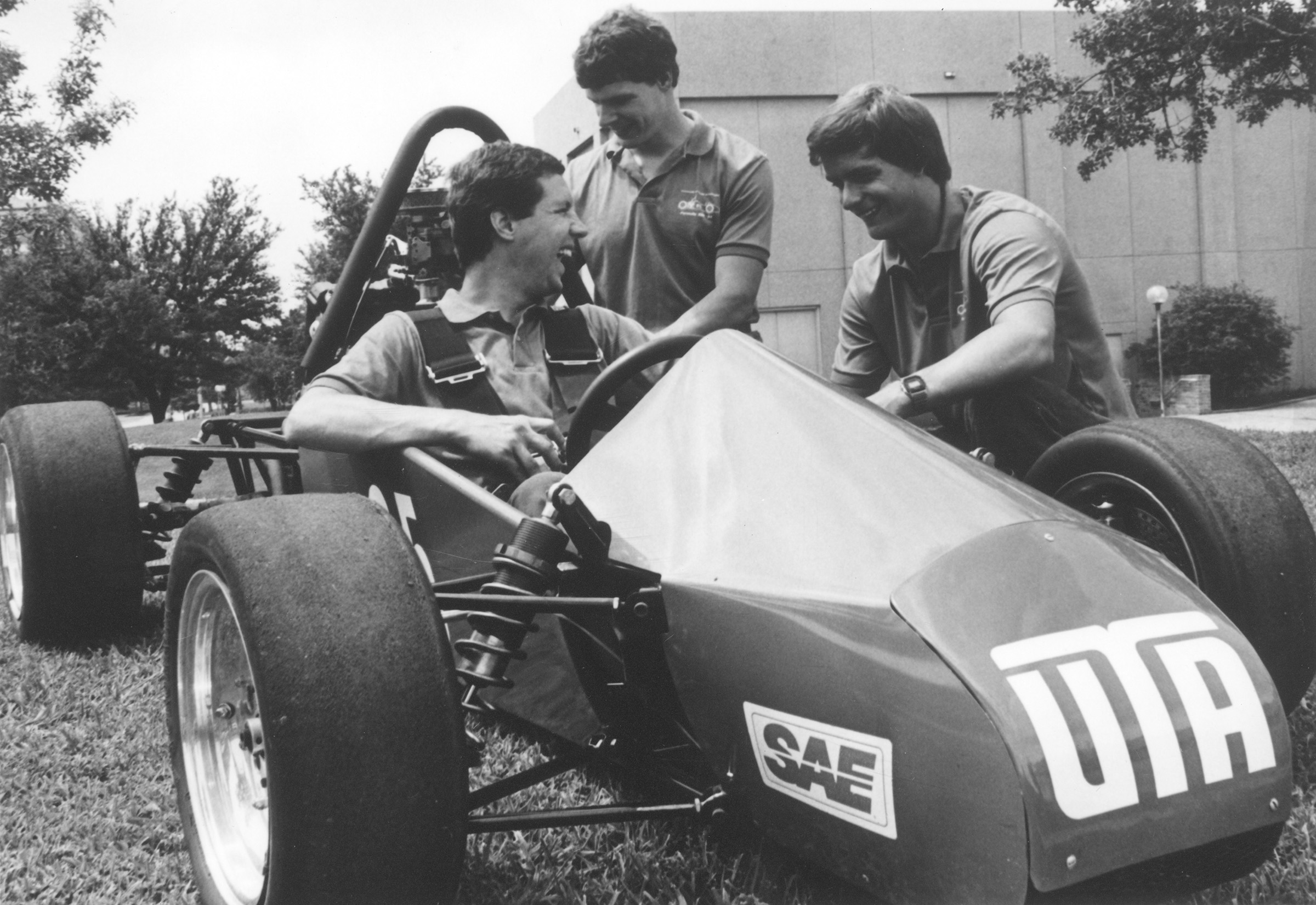
University of Texas at Arlington Formula SAE car, 1986

In 1979 the only SAE Mini-Indy was held at the University of Houston. Conceived by Dr. Kurt M. Marshek, the competition was inspired by a how-to article that appeared in Popular Mechanics magazine, for a small, "Indy-style" vehicle made out of wood, and powered by a five-horsepower Briggs & Stratton engine. Using the Mini Baja competitions as a guide, engineering students had to design and build small, "Indy-style" vehicles using the same stock engine used in the Popular Mechanics article. Thirteen schools entered and eleven competed. The University of Texas at El Paso won the overall competition under chief supervision.

Although Dr. William Shapton (who had recently left the University of Cincinnati to join Michigan Technological University) broached the idea of hosting a similar competition in 1980, no one stepped up to organize another Mini-Indy.

In 1980 when the members of the new SAE student branch at the University of Texas (Austin) learned that the Mini-Indy had died, they generated the concept for a new intercollegiate student engineering design competition that would allow students to apply what they were learning in the classroom to a complex, real-world engineering design problem: design and development of a race car. UT SAE student branch members Robert Edwards and John Tellkamp led a discussion among UT SAE members and envisioned a competition that would involve designing and constructing a race car along the lines of the SCCA Formula 440 entry-level racing series that was popular at the time. Prof. Matthews came up with the “Formula SAE” name following the format of Formula A and Formula Vee but emphasizing that this new race car was an engineering competition rather than a driver's competition. Schools would meet after the end of the academic year to compete and determine who had built the best car. Edwards, Tellkamp, and fellow UT SAE students Joe Green, Dick Morton, Mike Best, and Carl Morris drafted a set of safety and competition rules and presented them to the SAE student branch membership and to UT SAE Faculty Advisor Prof. Ron Matthews. Prof. Matthews then contacted Bob Sechler of the SAE Educational Relations Department at SAE headquarters and asked for his permission both to establish the new intercollegiate student engineering design competition and to host the first Formula SAE competition during the summer of 1981, and he agreed. The newly formed UT SAE branch, consisting mostly of automotive and motorcycle enthusiasts pursuing engineering degrees, including several who had left careers in fields for which the job market had virtually disappeared due to the depressed economy in the early 1980s – including some experienced auto mechanics, embraced and adopted the concept with little idea of what they were getting themselves into. SAE student branch officers Mike Best, Carl Morris, and Sylvia Obregon, along with Dr. Matthews began planning and organizing the event to be held the following year.

Formula SAE was NOT a simple renaming of the Mini-Indy competition but was instead an entirely new intercollegiate student engineering design competition. Unlike all previous SAE-sanctioned student racing/design competitions including Mini-Indy, the Formula SAE rules left the selection of the engine to the design team, as long as a 4 stroke engine with a one-inch diameter intake restrictor was used. (The current Formula SAE rules allow the teams to use 4-stroke engines up to 710 cc, with a smaller restrictor.) Also, unlike all previous SAE-sanctioned student racing/design competitions including Mini-Indy, engine modifications were both allowed and encouraged. The first Formula SAE competition was held in the parking lot of the UT baseball field (Disch-Falk field) on the University of Texas campus on Memorial Day weekend, 1981. Judges included legendary race car engineer/owner/driver and Indy 500 champion Jim Hall. While a sudden Texas rain storm sent everyone scrambling for cover just before the endurance event that day, the weather failed to dampen the spirits of the students, judges, or spectators and Formula SAE was born. The University of Texas continued to host the event from 1982 to 1984 as the popularity and number of participants grew. In these subsequent years, UT moved the Formula SAE competition to other parking areas that included elevation changes and driveway aprons that forced the use of functioning suspensions. The event became international in 1982 with the entry of Universidad La Salle team from Mexico City. The significant rules changes for 1982 were: 1) a displacement limit of 600 cc (300 cc for Wankels), but the 1 inch diameter restrictor rule was retained, 2) a requirement for 4-wheel independent suspension (Mini-Indy did not have any suspension rules), and 3) the addition of a temporary “B&S” class of vehicles that were originally designed for Mini-Baja, had to retain the 8 hp Briggs & Stratton engine, and did not need to comply with the 4-wheel independent suspension rule. Formula SAE continued to be an international competition when the team from Universidad La Salle returned. With the only engine restrictions being a displacement limit of 600 cc and a 1-inch maximum diameter for the intake, creativity flourished. Also in 1983, the temporary B&S class was eliminated, the University of Texas at Austin entered the first composite Formula SAE vehicle and Marquette University entered the first turbocharged engine. The rules allowed a Formula SAE car to compete for two years in recognition of the effort required to build and test a quality car. This also allowed students the experience of re-engineering and improving on design elements that did not work. The rules for 1984 specifically allowed turbochargers, superchargers, and use of nitrous oxide but the engine had to breathe through a 25.4 mm exit bore of the carburetor casting (1984 was well before electronic fuel injection). Engine intake restrictors were later tightened as cars became faster year over year as knowledge was passed on within and between teams. Also, a 65-100 inch wheelbase rule was promulgated, as was a rule requiring all vehicles to have a “body that resembles a formula car”. The Formula SAE field had grown to eleven cars in 1984, so the University of Texas at Austin decided that the competition had matured sufficiently that it was safe to pass it on to other hosts.

The University of Texas at Austin hosted the competition through 1984. In 1985, the competition was hosted by The University of Texas at Arlington. There, Dr. Robert Woods, with guidance from the SAE student activities committee, changed the concept of the competition from one where students built a pure racing car, to one that mirrored the SAE Mini-Baja competitions, where they were to design and build a vehicle for limited series production.

General Motors hosted the competition in 1991, Ford Motor Co. in 1992, and Chrysler Corp. in 1993. After the 1992 competition, the three formed a consortium to run Formula SAE.

At the end of the 2008 competition, the consortium ceased to exist. The event is now funded by SAE through company sponsorships and donations along with the teams' enrollment fees.

== See also ==
- Baja SAE
- Formula Student
