= Modular smartphone =

Smartphone made of replaceable parts

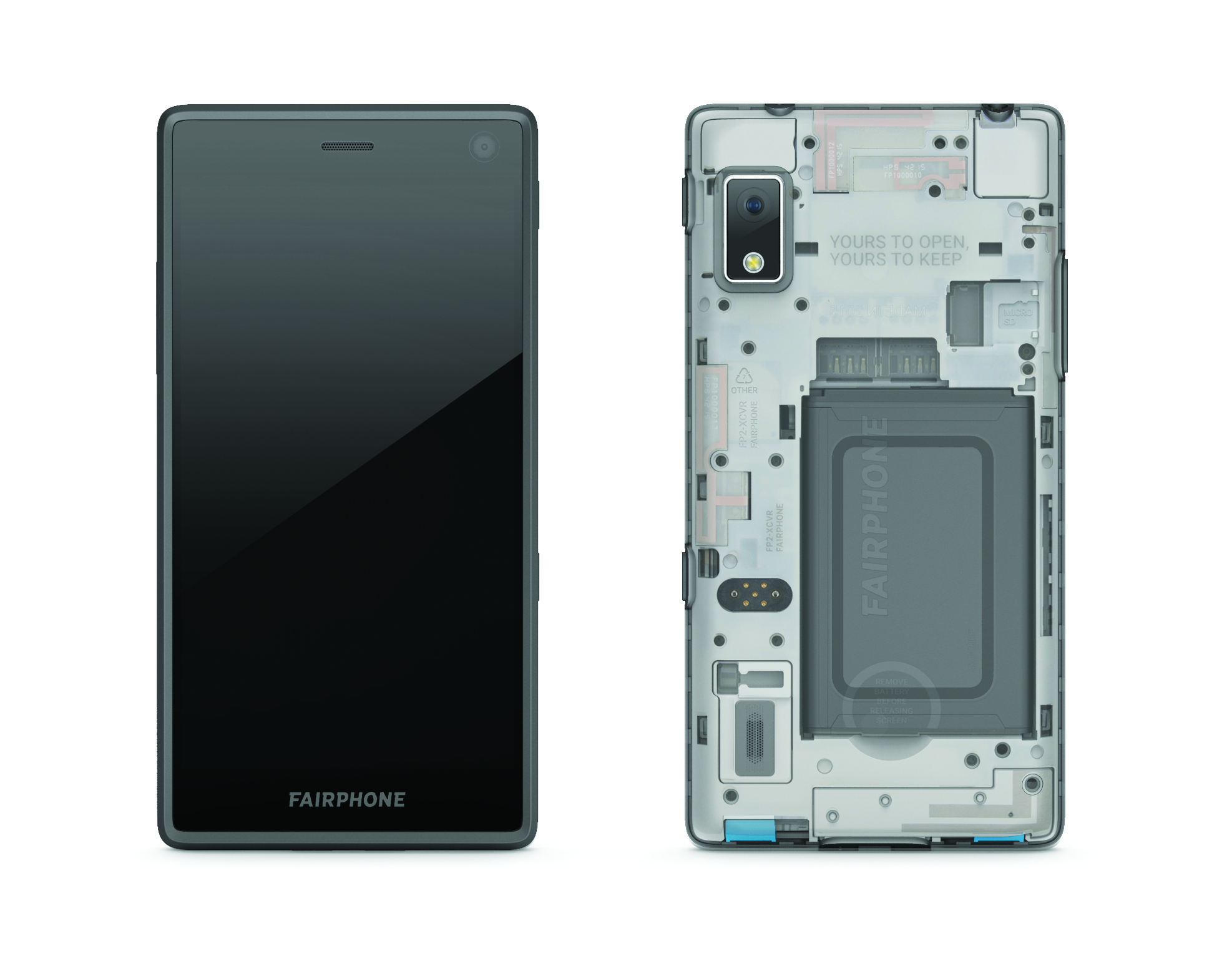
Front and back of a Fairphone 2 with a transparent case, showing the modular design. The individual components can be highlighted in the annotated image.

A modular smartphone is a smartphone designed for users to upgrade or replace components and modules without the need for resoldering or repair services. The most important component is the main board, to which others such as cameras and batteries are attached. Components can be obtained from open-source hardware stores.

This design aims to reduce electronic waste, increase the phone's lifespan, and lower repair costs. However, modular smartphones are generally bulkier and slower than their non-modular counterparts which may make them less attractive for most consumers.

== Motivation ==
=== Environmental impact and ethical considerations ===
Consumers may be motivated to buy modular phones to bypass non-modular phones, which are designed with planned obsolescence. Planned obsolescence, originating from American industrial designer Brooks Stevens, is a strategy of selling phones to be replaced rather than repaired.

Planned obsolescence in smartphones prematurely shortens their life spans, as users replace their smartphones earlier than necessary. This quick consumption cycle, caused by planned obsolescence, can lead to increased electronic waste. (Electronic waste is one of the world's fastest growing sources of waste.)

Modular phones, which are repairable and do not need to be as frequently replaced, are considered as a sustainable consumer electronic. Modular phones have also been proposed as an ethically conscious alternative to annual phone release. However, the degree of benefits are unclear because modular phone companies can not accurately trace the origin of all their materials.

In addition to the impact of disposal, the manufacturing of phones, which includes use of conflict minerals can result in soil degradation and heavy metal pollution. High amounts of energy, ore and processing power are required to obtain small quantities of the minerals used in the circuit board, display and battery of mobile phones.

=== Repairability ===
Consumers often prematurely replace their smartphones due to degradation of certain components that experience the most mechanical stress and are costly to repair (specifically the display, battery, or back cover). Modularity in smartphones promotes self-repair over repair services by enabling consumers to swap out faulty components for functional ones without incurring service or labor costs. The ability to self-repair creates positive user experience, which translates to higher satisfaction and brand loyalty.

=== Customization and upgradability ===
Modular phones are part of a trend in mass customization, propelled by consumers’ demand for new product iterations within shorter time frames. Companies like Fairphone and Google saw modular smartphones as a way to extend the life cycles of smartphones and their components while satisfying the consumer need for incremental customizations and upgrades. Such customization-intense platforms can have many resultant configurations.

=== Component lending ===
Modular components that can be lent out when they are not in use by the owner is a concept not yet realized, but is being considered as a viable option to reduce e-waste. Specialized components such as ultra high-definition cameras, condenser microphones, or barometers are generally costly to produce, and are only useful in very specific applications. These specialized components can be lent out to users on a per-need basis, thus reducing the number of units that need to be produced and increasing the number of people who can have access to otherwise hard-to-obtain equipment.

== History ==
=== Modu (2008) ===
The Modu Phone is a modular smartphone created by an Israeli company. The Modu Phone is the first modular smartphone and has a record as the world’s lightest hand-held mobile phone in the Guinness World Records. The Modu Phone is a ‘Jacket’ type modular smartphone that allows customers to chop and customize the style of their mobile phone by slipping it into various Modu jackets, also known as phone connector. The Modu jackets available for the customers were GPS, camera, MP3 player, and keyboards.

The Modu Phone was first commercially launched in Israel in June 2009. The introductory Modu Phone kit was about $125 (500 Israeli shekels). The introductory Modu Phone kit contains 2GB of internal memory device and a music player jacket.

In January 2011, Modu announced that the company was in debt and closed all operations in the following month. In May 2011, Google paid $4.9 million for the patents of the Modu company’s mobile phones, including the Modu Phone.

=== Phonebloks (2013) ===
In 2013, Phonebloks (a concept that was never manufactured) was the first modular smartphone concept that attracted widespread attention. First conceptualized by Dutch industrial designer, Dave Hakkens, this smartphone would have been made of detachable blocks that are connected to a base. Each detachable block would have had pins which transfer electrical signals to the base. To lock the device together, two small screws are used at the base.

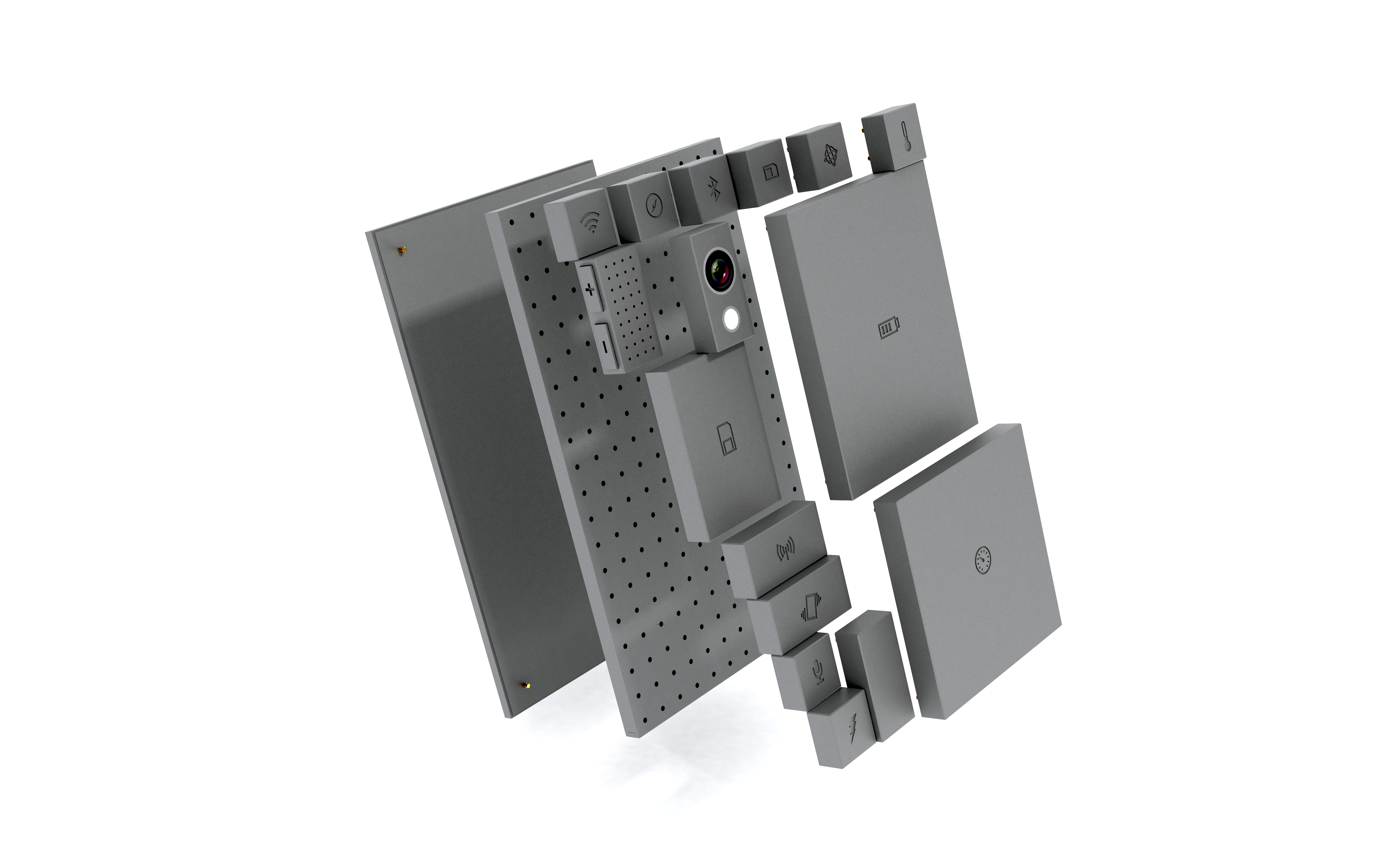
A diagram of the Phonebloks concept. Different sized modules were imagined as being attached to a base that served as the motherboard for the modular smartphone.

The concept of Phonebloks would not only have allowed a customer to easily replace broken components of the phone, rather than replacing the entire device, it also allow a customer to build and customize their perfect phone. This would have included upgrading to a larger storage block, or a better camera, depending on the user’s use of the component.

=== Project Ara (2013) ===
Inspired by the concept of Phonebloks, Google developed a modular smartphone project called Project Ara. This project was formerly headed by the Advanced Technology and Projects team of Motorola Mobility.

The purpose of Project Ara was to develop a smartphone that could be repaired, rather than replaced entirely. It was hoped that it could be part of a solution to decrease the electronic waste produced from non-modular smartphones. Google's design consisted of one metal endoskeleton with several different hardware modules attached. These parts included the battery, the processor, the display screen, the camera, storage components, and speakers.

In addition to reducing electronic waste, Project Ara also proposed to include a specialized Wifi module that would ensure a strong signal no matter the ISP. Project Ara's starter kit which includes the endoskeleton, CPU, battery, display, and Wifi was priced at $50.

Due to the device's complexity, its need for constant upgrading, and lack of support from mobile carriers, Google abandoned Project Ara. Most consumers purchase their cell phones without a thorough understanding of the internal components, but purchasing a modular smartphone would force consumers to learn about how the processor, RAM, and the storage impact a smartphone's functionality when looking for upgrades. In addition, big mobile companies did not support Project Ara because they directly profit from customers replacing their non-modular smartphones every few years. Finally, due to the constant advancements of hardware components, such as graphic cards, CPU, RAM, and storage cards, the modular smartphone would need to be constantly upgraded. This may ultimately create more electronic waste since more modules may need to be replaced more frequently than replacing a smartphone.

=== Fairphone (2015) ===
Fairphone is a modular smartphone created by a Dutch company, a social enterprise that aims to produce smartphones with the goal of having a lower environmental footprint. The first model of Fairphone, Fairphone 1, was released in 2013, and the most recent model, Fairphone 6, was released in June 2025.

As of 2022, Fairphone 4 was priced at €579 and had sold around 400,000 devices in Europe. Fairphone 4 uses a Kryo 570 processor that can support 5G connectivity, with a Sony IMX363 camera sensor. According to the company, it has increased the lifespan of a phone by two years and achieved a decrease of 29% for the yearly Global Warming Potential impact category when extending the phone lifetime to 5 years and 42% of the GWP when extended to 7 years.

=== Shiftphone (2015) ===
Shiftphone is a modular smartphone created by the German company SHIFT. The first model of Shiftphone, SHIFT4 was released in 2015, and the most recent version was the SHIFT6mq released in June 2020. The next model is expected to be SHIFTphone 8, scheduled for release in 2023. Currently, the annual turnover of Shift is less than 1 million.

To lower the inhibition threshold of self-repair, SHIFT provides video instructions via YouTube, and provides a repair service for customers. The company also offers hardware upgrade opportunities. The goal of the company is to provide spare parts for a period of ten years for the Shift 6mq released.

Shiftphone and the company were criticized for not providing information regarding conflict-free material used in Shiftphone. The company also did not provide detailed audit reports about component suppliers.

== Challenges ==
=== Technical limitations ===
Modular smartphones are difficult to miniaturize, and as a result, they are generally bulkier, slower, and less sturdy than non-modular phones. Because a modular smartphone is separated into individual components, the distance between each of the components is significantly larger than that of non-modular phones. This increased bulkiness leads modular smartphones to having a shorter battery life and slower responsiveness because distances between components are directly correlated with data speeds and power efficiency; the larger the distance, the slower the speed and efficiency.

Modular phones also rely on pre-manufactured components from different suppliers like InvenSense, Asahi Kasei, and Amotech that roughly fit different connecting pieces together. This uneven fitting of the different modules causes the device to function slower than non-modular smartphones, which have perfectly aligned components that increase device responsiveness.

Furthermore, making pluggable modules that are more space-optimal would be difficult due to the complexity of hardware configurations. Separate modules not only take up more space, but they also require individualized and self-contained boxes in order to ensure each component can be safely handled, which also adds to the device's overall size. In contrast, non-modular phones, such as the iPhone produced by Apple Inc., the memory, the processor, and the graphics circuitry are all built into a single chip. This is able to foster a faster connection and a significantly smaller device.

The intrinsically interchangeable nature of modular phones also poses a challenge as this characteristic makes these devices less sturdy. While Project Ara used latches and electropermanent magnets to achieve a more durable phone, the device still has a higher potential for breaking apart than non-modular smartphones because they rely on detachable components. In addition, due to the nature of modular smartphones having removable modules, as users pry modules off, replace them, and move them around, there is an increased possibility of breakage that exceeds that of non-modular devices.

=== Market uncertainty ===
There are also market uncertainties about consumer demand and distribution of modular smartphones. Currently, smartphone consumers prefer to have fast product iteration and individualization. There are concerns that consumers may be overwhelmed by the number of choices and would prefer pre-packaged phones, or that the modular smartphone distribution process lacks the agility to keep up with short product life-cycles. Therefore, the secondary component market's viability is unclear, until more products become available.

In addition to uncertainties regarding consumer demand, there are concerns about whether smartphone providers have sufficient incentives to distribute modular smartphones. providers, like AT&T and Verizon, are profitable because of their trade-in policies and short-term contracts for phones. Therefore, these companies may not be receptive to selling and promoting modular smartphones that may result in fewer trade-ins if it may risk their own profits.

While there are concerns, proponents hope that the technical challenges can be overcome and that a viable market ecosystem (the hardware version of an app store) will enable finer-grained competition that will benefit consumers with better and cheaper choices.

== Modular phone platforms ==
=== Current ===
- Fairphone 6, Fairphone 5, Fairphone 4, Fairphone 3, 2 and 1 by Fairphone
- Librem 5, by Purism
- Pinephone, by Pine64
- Shift6mq, Shift6m and Shift5me by SHIFT
- HMD Fusion and Skyline by HMD

=== In development ===
- SHIFTmu by SHIFT

=== Discontinued ===
- Essential Phone by Essential Products
- LG G5 by LG
- Moto Z, Moto Z Force and Moto Z Play by Motorola Mobility
- Phonebloks
- Project Ara by Google
