= Project Ara =

Project for a modular smartphone by Google

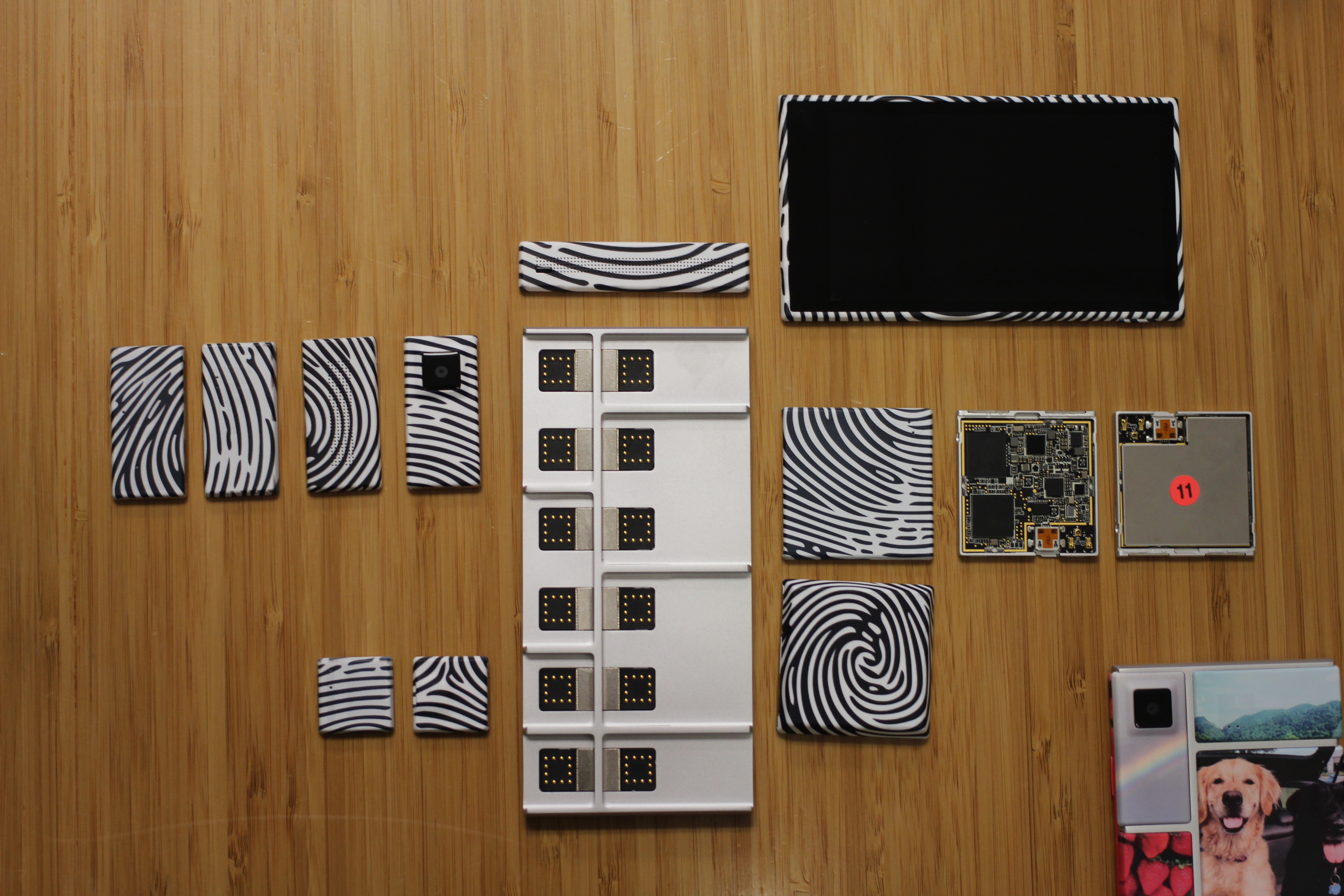
- Ara smartphones with individual modules separated
- Also known as: Ara
- Developer: Google (formerly with Motorola Mobility through the Advanced Technology and Projects group)
- Manufacturer: Google (individual modules and smartphone)
- Product family: Yes
- Type: Modular smartphone
- Released: Cancelled
- Operating system: Android
- Website: Official website

Project Ara was a modular smartphone project under development by Google. The project was originally headed by the Advanced Technology and Projects team within Motorola Mobility while it was a Google subsidiary. Google retained the ATAP group when selling Motorola Mobility to Lenovo, and it was placed under the stewardship of the Android development staff; Ara was later split off as an independent operation. Google stated that Project Ara was being designed to be utilized by "6 billion people": 1 billion current smartphone users, and 5 billion feature phone users.

Under its original design, as envisioned by NewDealDesign, under the leadership of Gadi Amit, Project Ara was intended to consist of hardware modules providing common smartphone parts, such as processors, displays, batteries, and cameras, as well as modules providing more specialized components, and "frames" that these modules were to be attached to. This design would allow a device to be upgraded over time with new capabilities and upgraded without requiring the purchase of an entire new device, providing a longer lifecycle for the device and potentially reducing electronic waste. However, by 2016, the concept had been revised, resulting in a base phone with non-upgradable core components, and modules providing supplemental features.

Google planned to launch a new developer version of Ara in the fourth quarter of 2016, with a target bill of materials cost of $50 for a basic phone, leading into a planned consumer launch in 2017. However, on September 2, 2016, Reuters reported that two non-disclosed sources leaked that Alphabet's manufacture of frames had been canceled, with possible future licensing to third parties. Later that day, Google confirmed that Project Ara had been shelved.

== Structure and features ==
Google intended Project Ara to lower the entry barrier for phone hardware manufacturers so there could be "hundreds of thousands of developers" instead of the existing oligarchy of phone manufacturers.

Ara frames
Frame	Size	Rear module slots
Mini	118 × 45 × 9.7 mm (4.65 × 1.77 × 0.38 in)	2 × 5
Medium	141 × 68 × 9.7 mm (5.55 × 2.68 × 0.38 in)	3 × 6
Large	164 × 91 × 9.7 mm (6.46 × 3.58 × 0.38 in)	4 × 7

The Project Ara concept consisted of modules inserted into metal endoskeletal frames known as "endos." The frame would be the only component manufactured by Google. The frame was the switch to the on-device network linking all the modules together. Google planned two sizes of frames on launch; a "mini" frame about the size of a Nokia 3310 and a "medium" frame about the size of a Nexus 5. Google also planned a "large", phablet frame about the size of a Samsung Galaxy Note 3 to be released in the future. Frames have slots on the front for the display and other modules. On the back are additional slots for modules. Each frame was expected to cost around US$15. The data from the modules can be transferred at up to 10 Gbit/s per connection. The 2×2 modules have two connections and would allow up to 20 Gbit/s.

Modules would provide common smartphone features, such as cameras and speakers, but could also provide more specialized features, such as medical devices, receipt printers, laser pointers, pico projectors, night vision sensors, or game controller buttons. Each slot on the frame accepted any module of the correct size. The front slots are of various heights and took up the whole width of the frame. The rear slots had standard sizes of 1×1, 1×2 and 2×2. Modules were to be hot-swapped without turning the phone off. The frame also included a small backup battery so the main battery can be hot-swapped. Modules were originally to be secured with electropermanent magnets, but this was replaced by a different method. The enclosures of the modules were planned to be 3D-printed, but due to the lack of development in the technology, Google opted instead for a customizable molded case.

Google intended to sell a starter kit where the bill of materials is US$50 and includes a frame, display, battery, low-end CPU and WiFi. Google planned to provide an open development process for modules, and would not have required manufacturers to pay a license fee. Modules were to be available both at an official Google store and at third-party retailers. Similarly to Android apps, an Ara device would be configured by default to only accept modules officially certified by Google, but users would have been able to disable this.

== Project team ==
Project Ara was developed and was led by Paul Eremenko, who in 2015 became CEO of the Airbus Group Silicon Valley technology and business innovation center. The project fell under Regina Dugan, who runs Google's Advanced Technology and Projects (ATAP) organization. Both Eremenko and Dugan worked previously at DARPA, where Eremenko originated the fractionated spacecraft concept and ran the Adaptive Vehicle Make program before heading the Tactical Technology office . The core Project Ara team at Google consisted of three people, with most of the work being done by outside contractors, such as NK Labs, a Massachusetts-based engineering firm. NK Labs then subcontracted the firm Leaflabs to do firmware development, and they later became the primary firmware developers in a direct contract with Google. The main physical concept design of the Frame and Modules was created by NewDealDesign a San Francisco based Technology design studio that was commissioned by ATAP to lead the design of the project. That was selected from 11 different configurations analyzed by the joint team. The company 3D Systems was contracted to experiment with 3D printing of electrical components, which could further the goal of mass customization.

== Development ==
Prior to its acquisition of Motorola Mobility in 2011, Google had previously acquired some patents related to modular mobile phones from Modu. Initial exploration of this concept began in 2012 and work started on April 1, 2013. Unrelated to work done by the Ara team, Dutch designer Dave Hakkens announced the Phonebloks modular phone concept independently in September 2013. Motorola Mobility publicly announced Project Ara on October 29, 2013, and said they would be working collaboratively with Phonebloks, although the original team, consisting of internal and external resources, continued working together without any change to its original design and technology. Motorola Mobility went on a 5-month road trip throughout the United States in 2013 called "MAKEwithMOTO" to gauge consumer interest in customized phones. Interested developers, testers, or users could sign up to be Ara Scouts.

The first version of the developers' kit relied on a prototype implementation of the Ara on-device network using the Mobile Industry Processor Interface (MIPI) UniPro protocol implemented on FPGA and running over a Low-voltage differential signaling (LVDS) physical layer with modules connecting via retractable pins. Subsequent versions were to be built around a much more efficient and higher performance ASIC implementation of UniPro, running over a capacitive M-PHY physical layer. A near-working prototype of an Ara smartphone was demonstrated at Google I/O 2014, but it froze on the boot screen.

In January 2015, Google unveiled the "Spiral 2" prototype, and that it planned to test market a later revision of the system in the U.S. territory of Puerto Rico later in the year. Google chose the region due to it having a large mobile phone market, and because it is still subject to U.S. telecommunications laws—allowing for continued correspondence with the FCC. However, in August 2015, Google announced that the Ara pilot in Puerto Rico had been delayed indefinitely, and that the company would instead hold pilots in "a few locations" in the U.S. some time in 2016.

At Google I/O 2016, the company unveiled a new development model, the "Developer Edition". The new iteration featured notable changes to the original concept; the device now consisted of a base phone with core components that cannot be upgraded, including the antenna, battery, display, sensors, and system-on-chip, and extensible with modules for adding features such as a secondary display or replacement cameras and speakers. Google announced that it planned to ship the Developer Edition in late 2016, and perform a consumer launch of Project Ara in 2017.

On September 2, 2016, Google confirmed that Project Ara had been cancelled.

== Reception ==
Initial reception to an earlier but similar modular phone concept—Phonebloks—was mixed, citing possible infeasibility, lack of a working prototype, as well as other production and development concerns. Project Ara's launch followed shortly after the launch of Phonebloks and better addressed some of the production and development issues since it had OEM backing, but other issues were raised about the Project Ara modular concept.

Potential issues with the modular concept include a tradeoff between volumetric efficiency and modularity, as the framework interface holding the device would increase overall size and weight. Eremenko says modularity would create a difference of less than 25% in size, power, and weight to components, and he believes that is an acceptable trade-off for the added flexibility. The current prototype is 9.7mm thick, slightly thicker than conventional smartphones. Additional issues include regulatory approval; the FCC tests single configurations for approval, not modular configurations. In 2014, Google said the FCC "[had] been encouraging so far".

== See also ==
- Fairphone 3
