= Precious Plastic =

Open hardware plastic recycling project

- Formation: 2013; 13 years ago
- Founder: Dave Hakkens
- Location: Eindhoven
- Region served: Worldwide
- Website: preciousplastic.com

Precious Plastic is an open hardware plastic recycling project and is a type of open source digital commons project. The project was started in 2013 by Dave Hakkens and is now in its fourth iteration. It relies on a series of machines and tools which grind, melt, and inject recycled plastic, allowing for the creation of new products out of recycled plastic on a small scale.

== History ==
In 2012, Dave Hakkens started working on Precious Plastic as a part of his studies at the Design Academy in Eindhoven. The project was released in 2013 as Version 1.0.

The work on version 2 was started in 2015 and was released in March 2016. In 2016, Precious Plastic also created a marketplace called Bazar for selling machines and products targeted to DIY designers to recycle plastic.

The team started working on version 3.0 from early 2017 and was launched in October 2017.

In May 2018, Precious Plastic received the Famae award of €300,000 to further develop the project. The city of Eindhoven also provided them a big workspace free of charge. In October 2018, Precious Plastic project officially opened its doors at the VDMA building in Eindhoven. The work on Version 4.0 was started in September 2018.

In 2019 Hakkens and Precious Plastic were involved in disagreement over whether to burn or recycle plastics collected from the oceans.

The version 4, which includes business models and starter kits for creating recycling systems, was announced in January 2020.

In December 2020, One Army was launched as an umbrella organization for a growing collection of projects including Precious Plastic, Project Kamp, PhoneBloks, Fixing Fashion, and Story Hopper.

Fixing Fashion was launched in March 2021.

== Description ==
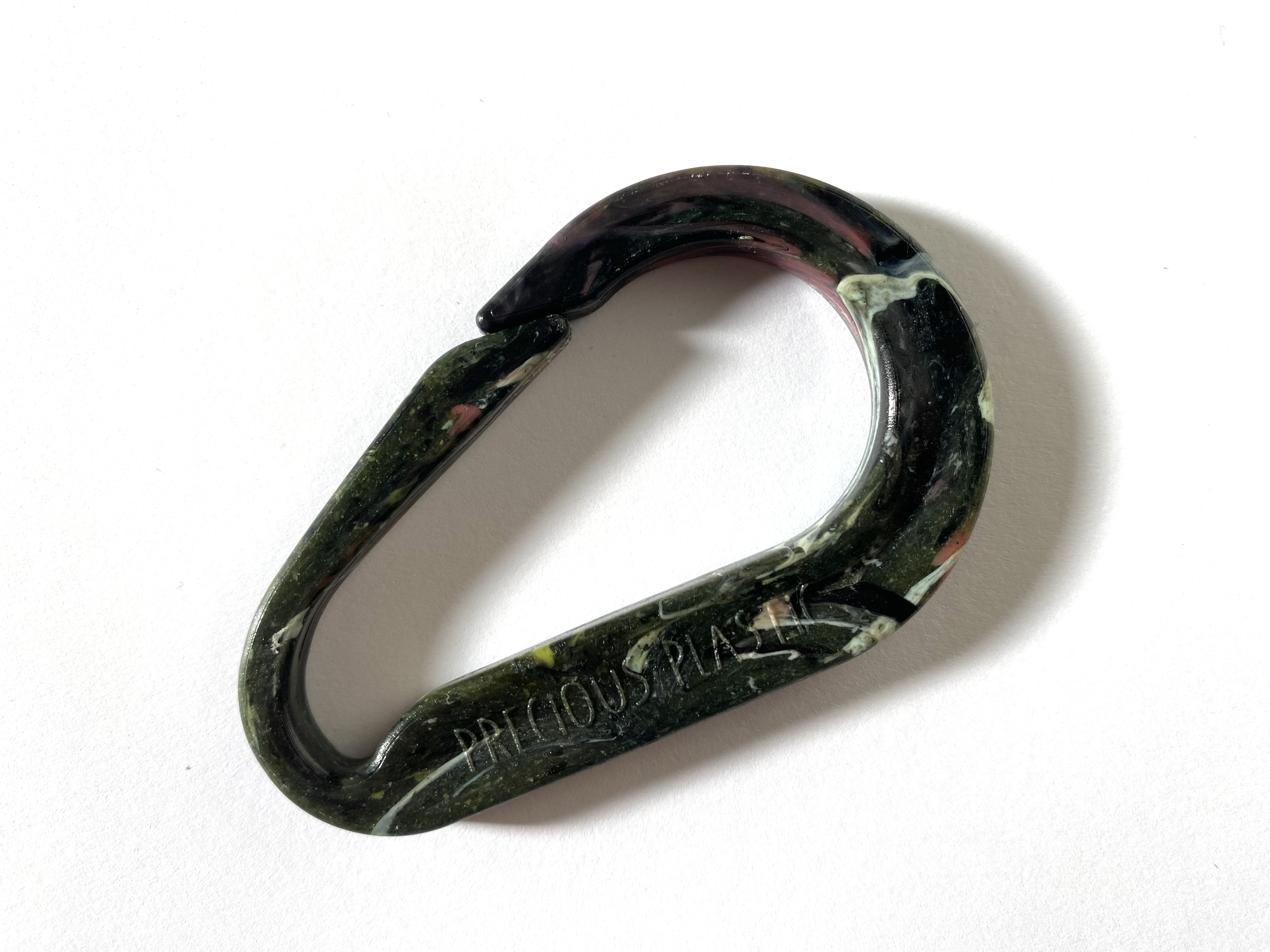
A recycled plastic carabiner made with Precious Plastic machinery by Parley for the Oceans

Precious Plastic is an open hardware plastic recycling project and is a type of open source digital commons project. It relies on a series of machines and tools which grind, melt, and inject recycled plastic, allowing for the creation of new products out of recycled plastic on a small scale. The project allows individual consumers to set up "their own miniature recycling company".

The project is composed of more than 40,000 people in over 400 work spaces, either remotely or on site in the Netherlands. All the information produced by the project such as codes, drawings, and source materials are available for free online under the Creative Commons Attribution - Share Alike International 4.0 license.

== Related projects ==
Precious Plastic Fiji was formed in 2017 as a NGO dedicated to eliminating plastic waste.

In 2018 after a workshop in China, a company, Plastplan, grew out of the Precious Plastic project in Iceland to promote an alternative to shipping plastic to Sweden to be burned for electricity.

In Hawaii in 2019, Puna Precious Plastic, with more than 1,000 members as a part of the Precious Plastic worldwide movement, collected about 1,000 pounds, which it planned to sort, shred and melt into plastic bricks and lumber for construction.

In Thailand, Precious Plastic Bangkok collects plastic bottle caps to shred, melt, and reshape into new products, including monk's robes.

With a grant from Dane County Arts and partnered with Community GroundWorks, the nonprofit that oversees Troy Kids’ Garden, and hackerspace Sector 67, a branch of Precious Plastic was launched in Madison, Wisconsin.

In September 2021, One Army announced a "Verified" Precious Plastic workspaces program to give recognition to "high quality recycling work". Many locations around the world were listed.

== University involvement ==
In 2018, a group called Precious Plastic Texas was formed by students at the University of Texas after learning about what was being done in Thailand. In 2019 students in the Environmental Fellows Program's gateway seminar at DePauw University in Indiana began work on a Precious Plastic project, and received funding from the Joseph and Carol Danks Centers Council Fund for Multidisciplinary Projects. The project will continue in a gateway seminar and three art classes, and they may add an off-campus trip to a Precious Plastic site. In Australia, UNSW business school students, working closely with Precious Plastic, won the 2019 Big Idea competition in the postgraduate category with their start-up idea called Closed Loop – a local-level plastic waste recycling business. Engineering students at the Monash University chapter created a Precious Plastic one-metre cube portable recycling machine to transport to events for display.
