= Monash University Faculty of Engineering =

The Faculty of Engineering at Monash University is one of the largest engineering faculties in Australia, with over 6,700 students in 2015.

The faculty was established when the university opened in 1961.

It offers both undergraduate and postgraduate courses, including bachelor's degrees, Masters by coursework and research and PhDs. Undergraduate students can choose from thirteen engineering specialisations at the end of their first year.

== Rankings and achievements ==
- The Faculty of Engineering at Monash was ranked as the top engineering faculty in Australia in the Times Higher Education World University Rankings (2016 – 2017).
- The quality of the faculty's research was rated well above world standard by the Australian Research Council's Excellence in Research for Australia reports in 2012 and 2015.
- The Monash Bachelor of Engineering (Honours) is accredited by Engineers Australia.

== Organisation ==
The faculty comprises several departments and schools including:

- Department of Chemical Engineering
- Department of Civil Engineering
- Department of Electrical and Computer Systems Engineering
- Department of Materials Science and Engineering
- Department of Mechanical, Mechatronics and Aerospace Engineering
- School of Engineering, Malaysia

The Faculty of Engineering operates at the Clayton campus in Australia and at Monash University's Malaysia campus.

== Facilities ==
Monash University hosts a range of engineering facilities, including:

- The Monash Wind Tunnel, the largest wind tunnel in the Southern Hemisphere, which is used to test the aerodynamics of vehicles,
- The CAVE2, providing an immersive visualisation platform for exploring data,
- The New Horizons Centre, a Monash University/CSIRO collaboration dedicated to research addressing technological challenges in Australia and around the world,
- The Monash Centre for Electron Microscopy, housing one of the world's most advanced electron microscopes.

== Clubs and teams ==
Students of the faculty are involved in a range of co-curricular activities including;

- Monash Nova Rover, a group of multidisciplinary students across multiple faculties developing an analogue Martian and LunarRover. The team was the first team from the southern hemisphere ever to compete in the University Rover Challenge placing 2nd globally in 2026, alongside competing at the Australian Rover Challenge, placing 3rd in Australia.
- Monash Motorsport, a multi-disciplinary student team which competes in Formula SAE Australasia and other Formula SAE events. Monash Motorsport were Australasian champions from 2009-2015,
- Monash Unmanned Aerial Systems, a team who design, construct and fly a fully autonomous plane (UAS),
- Engineers Without Borders (EWB),
- Female Engineers at Monash (FEM),
- Robogals,
- Monash High Powered Rocketry, a group of enthusiastic students working towards the design, manufacture and flight of experimental scientific sounding rockets, for entry into the Australian Universities Rocket Competition and Spaceport America Cup(HPR),
- Precious Plastic.
- Monash Solar Decathlon Team (A multidisciplinary student team striving to design and improve feasible zero-emission buildings)

== Notable alumni ==
The Faculty of Engineering has produced a number of notable graduates who are leaders in their field, including:

- Alan Finkel (Electrical Engineering), Chief Scientist of Australia and Chancellor of Monash University from 2008 to 2016,
- Stephen Durkin (Civil Engineering), CEO of Engineers Australia,
- Peter Coleman (Civil Engineering), Managing Director of Woodside Energy,
- Professor Scott William Sloan (Civil Engineering), Director of the Australian Research Council (ARC) Centre of Excellence in Geotechnical Science and Engineering,
- Samantha Read (Materials Engineering), Chief Executive Officer of the Plastics and Chemical Industries Association (PACIA),
- Freddy Boey (Materials Engineering), Provost at Nanyang Technological University Singapore,
- Ahmad Belhoul, United Arab Emirates’ Minister of State for Higher Education Affairs.
- Daniel Lambert (Civil Engineering), Sir John Holland Civil Engineer of the Year 2021.
