= Clara Santato =

Italian electronics engineer

Clara Santato is an Italian electronics engineer who works in Canada as a professor in the Polytechnique Montréal Department of Engineering Physics, where she holds a tier 1 Canada Research Chair in Sustainable Organic Electronics: Materials, Processes and Devices and the UNESCO Chair in Green and Sustainable Electronics. Her research involves photoelectrochemistry, optoelectronics, bioelectronics, and sustainable electronics, including the photocatalysis of hydrogen from water and the use of biological pigments such as melanin in biocompatible electrodes.

== Education and career ==
Santato received a laurea (then the Italian equivalent of a master's degree) from the University of Bologna in 1995, and completed a Ph.D. in 2001 at the University of Geneva. Her doctoral dissertation, Preparation and characterization of nanostructured WO_{3} films as photoanodes in photoelectrochemical devices, was supervised by Jan Augustyński.

From 2001 to 2011 she worked for the Italian National Research Council at its Institute of Nanostructured Materials (ISMN) in Rome, during this time also holding visiting positions at Purdue University, the Quebec-based Institut national de la recherche scientifique, McGill University, and Cornell University.

After joining Polytechnique Montréal, she was awarded the Canada Research Chair in Sustainable Organic Electronics: Materials, Processes and Devices in 2020, and the UNESCO Chair in Green and Sustainable Electronics in 2023.

== Recognition ==
Santato was the 2018 recipient of the MRS Communications Lecture award of the journal MRS Communications, lecturing on the electronic properties of melanin based on a paper with Eduardo Di Mauro, Ri Xu, and Guido Soliveri in the journal. She was elected to the Canadian Academy of Engineering in 2022.
