= Fairphone 2 =

Smartphone

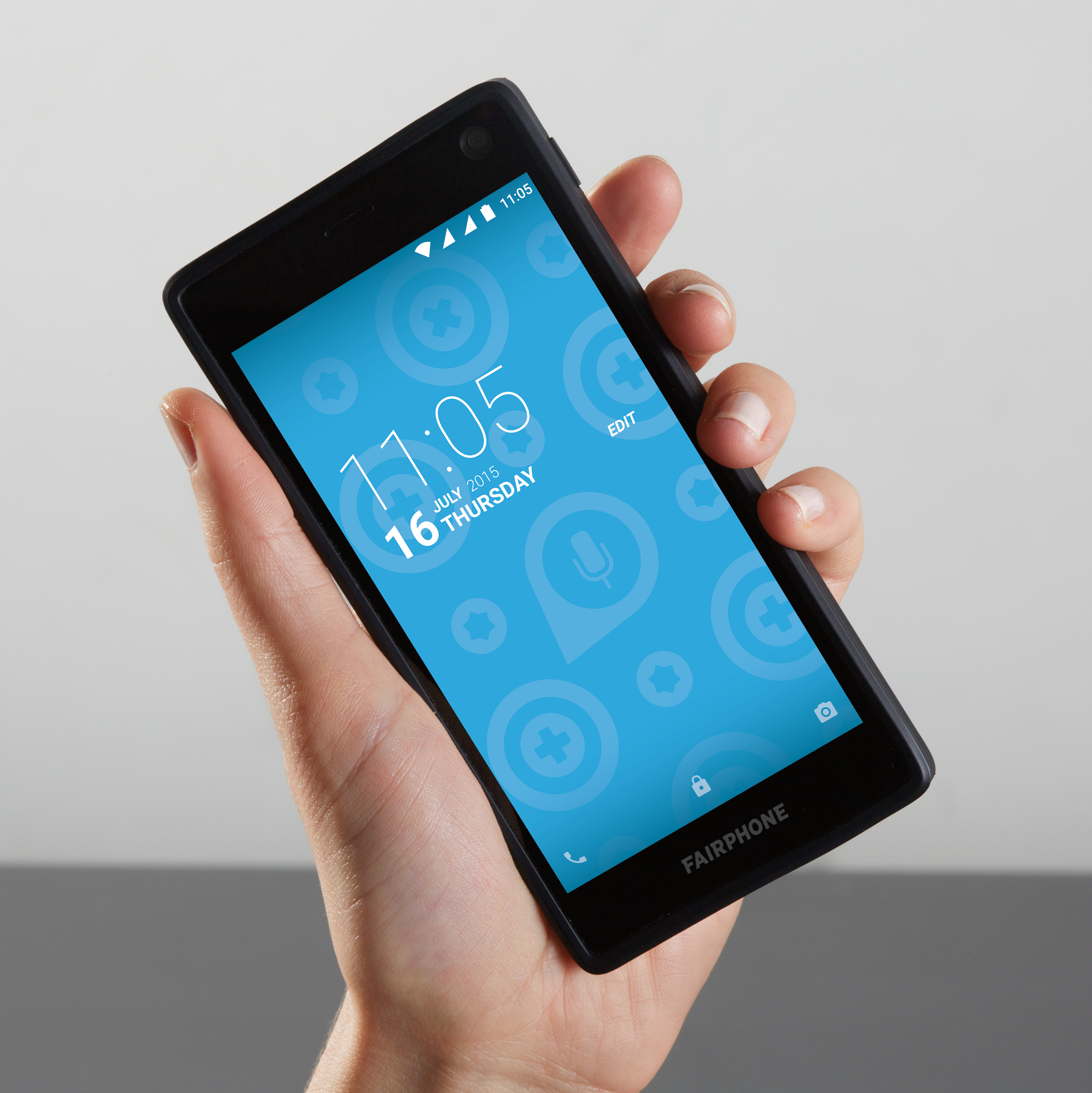
- Brand: Fairphone
- Manufacturer: Hi-P
- Type: Smartphone
- First released: December 2015; 10 years ago
- Units sold: 114,835
- Predecessor: Fairphone 1
- Successor: Fairphone 3
- Form factor: Slate
- Dimensions: 143.0 mm (5.63 in) H 73 mm (2.9 in) W 11 mm (0.43 in) D
- Weight: 168 g (5.9 oz)
- Operating system: upgradeable to Android 10; Android 5.1 "Lollipop" at launch
- System-on-chip: Qualcomm MSM8974AB-AB
- CPU: Qualcomm Snapdragon 801 (quad-core) 2.26 GHz
- GPU: Qualcomm Adreno 330 GPU 578 MHz
- Memory: 2 GB LPDDR3 RAM
- Storage: 32 GB eMMC5
- Removable storage: microSD
- Battery: 2420 mAh Li-ion
- Rear camera: 12 MP CMOS sensor (f/2.2) with dual-LED flash (Note: 8 MP at launch)
- Front camera: 5 MP (f/2.4) (Note: 2 MP at launch)
- Display: 5 in (130 mm) diagonal IPS LCD 1080×1920 px HD 446 ppi
- Connectivity: 2G (GSM/GPRS/EDGE): 850/900/1,800/1,900 MHz; 3G (UMTS/HSPA/HSPA+): 900/1,900/2,100 MHz; LTE: 800/1,800/2,600 MHz; Wi-Fi: 2.4/5.0 GHz, 802.11b/g/n/ac Bluetooth: 4.0 LE; Wi-Fi Hotspot microUSB 2.0 with support for USB OTG; Expansion Port on the backside for connectivity to external case
- SAR: 0.65 W/kg (head), 1.1 W/kg (body)
- Other: accelerometer, gyrometer, digital compass, proximity sensor, ambient light sensor, dual SIM
- Website: www.fairphone.com
- References: Specification of FP2

The Fairphone 2 is a touchscreen-based, dual-SIM smartphone designed to be easily repaired by the user. First released in October 2015, it was the first modular smartphone available for purchase and has since received both hardware improvements and major software updates, initially shipping with Android 5 "Lollipop" and running Android 10 as of November 2022. Production ceased in 2018.

It was the second phone from the social enterprise Fairphone and the first one completely designed by them. The phone was ethically sourced, using conflict-free minerals, Fair trade gold and recycled materials. It was assembled in audited factories with good working conditions.

== Design ==
=== Hardware choices ===
The phone was designed to have a higher life expectancy (five years) than other phones.

The Fairphone 1's system on a chip (SoC), Mediatek MT6589, was not widely used and thus did not receive long-term software support from its manufacturer. The Fairphone 2 used Snapdragon 801 platform (a high-end, early 2014 platform); hoping to maintain longer term support.

Fairphone deliberately did not include recent innovations like wireless charging or USB-C ports, intending for this to lead to lower prices and maintenance. However, the phone's modular design allows the modules to be changed with updated components. Newer versions of the modular design contain cameras.

The back of the Fairphone 2 was equipped with a USB pin-out and charging input, allowing aftermarket back covers with extended capabilities.

=== Ethical considerations ===
The phone was designed to have a lower environmental impact than comparable mass-market smartphones, with an expected lifespan of five years. The modular design allows components to be replaced individually.

Many electronic devices contain conflict minerals (tin, tungsten, tantalum and gold) from the Democratic Republic of the Congo (DRC), used by armies and rebel groups to fund war in the country. Therefore, some manufacturers avoid all materials from the DRC, which reduces employment opportunities in the country. The Fairphone 2 supply chain was audited to ensure that these materials come from mines that do not fund armed groups while supporting local communities in the DRC (where possible) to provide an alternative to conflict mines. The tantalum and tin ores are sourced from conflict-free mines in the DRC, the tungsten was from Rwanda, and the gold was from a Fairtrade certified mine in Peru. In addition, the phone includes recycled plastic, copper, and tungsten.

Hi-P assembled the Fairphone 2 in Suzhou, China, in a factory that has been audited to ensure that it meets high standards for working conditions and for the environment.

=== Modular design ===
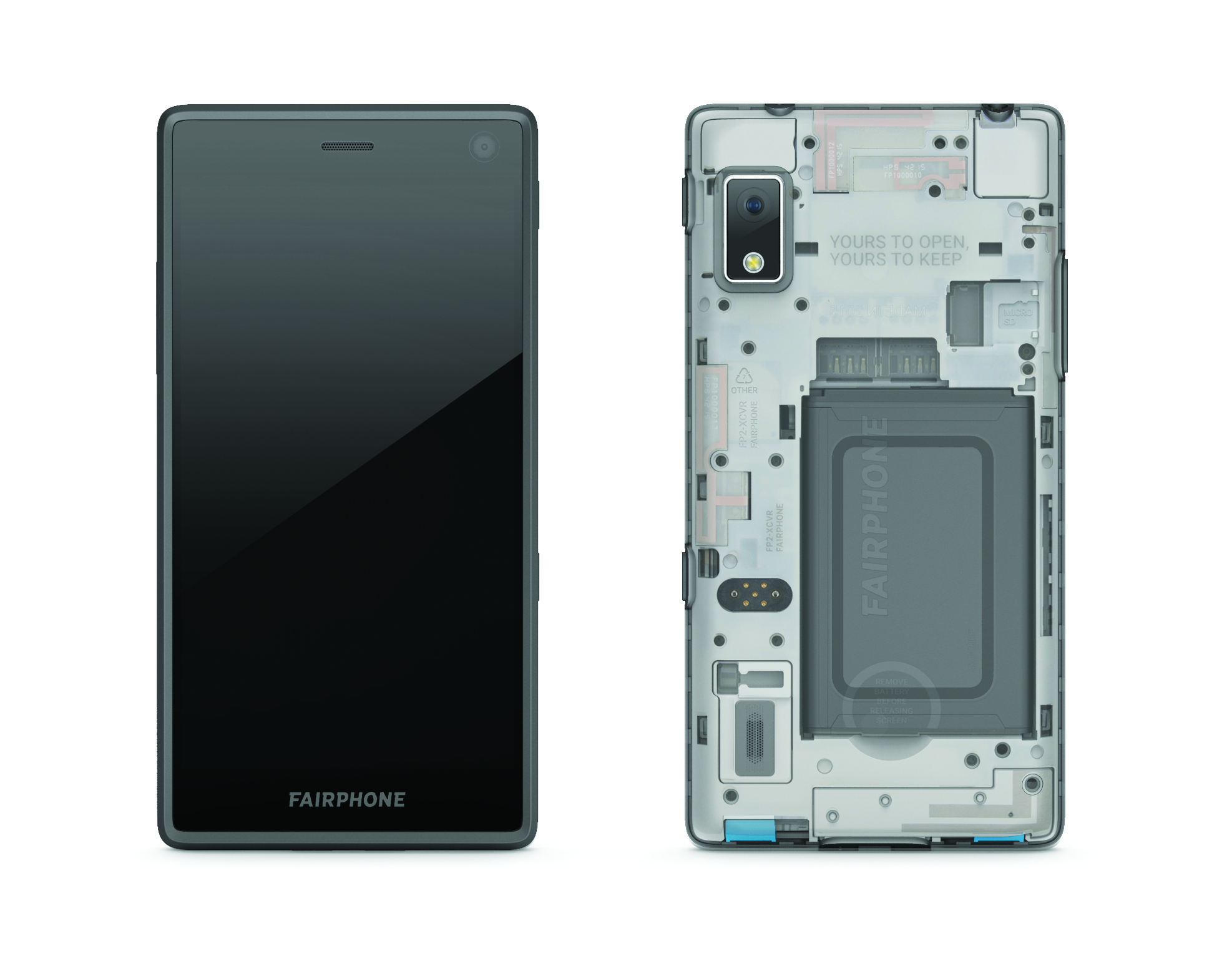
Front and back of the phone with a transparent case, showing the modular design. The individual components can be highlighted in the annotated image.

The Fairphone 2 was the first modular smartphone available to the general public. The modular, repairable design was designed to increase longevity, with an additional focus on increasing the product's recyclability. The phone components are designed to be replaceable, with the end user only needing to use a screwdriver to replace components of the phone. In addition, it was possible to replace individual components within each module.

The phone received a 10 out of 10 score for smartphone repairability from iFixit, the first phone to receive the score.

The phone consists of seven removable parts: the main chassis, the battery, the display assembly, the rear camera module, the top module (selfie camera, headphones, speaker, sensors), the bottom module (loudspeaker, vibration, microphone and charging port), and the back protective cover. Except for an updated slim case design, the first module set to be upgraded the cameras, with a new rear camera module (with a dual LED flash and 12-megapixel camera) and top module (with a 5-megapixel camera) in September 2017.

=== Software ===
Date	Event	Comment
22 Oct 2015	Sailfish OS port underway	With input from Fairphone developers.
21 Dec 2015	Launch. Android 5.1 “Lollipop”	Two variants of Android are available – the default Android installation, which includes Google Mobile Services (GMS), and the Fairphone open-source OS, which does not include GMS, but can easily be rooted. Unlike most Android manufacturers, Fairphone was committed to regularly releasing security patches and other updates.
Apr 2017	Android 6.0 “Marshmallow”	Free for all customers.
8 Feb 2017	Ubuntu Touch port	
20 May 2017	LineageOS 14.1 community release	First time an Android 7.1 “Nougat”-based operating system runs on the phone.
13 Nov 2018	Android 7.0 “Nougat” official update	First and so far only phone running on Snapdragon 801 to have this upgrade.
16 Jun 2020	Android 9.0 “Pie” beta	Fairphone in cooperation with the LineageOS team. Making it so far the only phone running on Snapdragon 801 to have an Android 9.0 “Pie” update
Mar 2021	Android 9.0 “Pie” stable	
Nov 2021	Android 10 release	
Mar 2023	Android 10 update	Final Fairphone 2 software update for Android 10

== Costs ==
The phone was primarily funded through pre-orders and was mostly sold directly, though in some markets the phone was available through resellers such as The Phone Co-op in the UK. The pre-order campaign started on 16 July 2015 and ended on 30 September 2015, with 17,418 phones pre-ordered (the objective was 15,000).

Just as they did for the Fairphone 1, Fairphone released details about costs for the Fairphone 2, which sold for an average price of €525. Despite its relatively high price compared to many phones (a similarly equipped "normal" phone cost about US$402–500), the margin on each phone sold was only €9, principally due to low sales volume and higher manufacturing costs than most phones. The price also funded a wide range of Fairphone's goals to make the phone more ethical, including recycling programs and partnerships for reduced usage of "blood minerals".

== Sales ==
On 16 July 2015, pre-orders for Fairphone 2 became available. To order the components needed to assemble the first devices, as well as to generate the revenue needed to ensure continuous production, Fairphone initiated a crowdfunding campaign by setting a goal to achieve 15,000 pre-orders by the end of September. The goal was finally exceeded, reaching a total of 17,418 pre-orders before the pre-order period ended on 30 September. Production started in December 2015, aiming to ship all phones ordered during the crowdfunding campaign that month. However, issues in ramping up production caused a delay. The last pre-ordered device was shipped on 8 February 2016. On 26 May 2016, Fairphone reported that their milestone of selling 40,000 of the Fairphone 2 had been reached and that all phones ordered before that date had been shipped.

== Discontinuation ==
On January 9th 2023 Fairphone announced that, after March 2023, the Fairphone 2 would stop receiving updates. Fairphone released the final update for the Fairphone 2 on March 7, 2023. Though parts for the phone are still available, the supply is limited.

== See also ==
- Modular smartphone, the concept of the phone for which components can be replaced
- List of open-source mobile phones, phones with open-source operating system
- Sailfish OS, an operating system based on Linux as an alternative to Android
- Project Ara, a project by Google to create a low-price modular phone. Discontinued in September 2016
