= Phonebloks =

Modular phone concept

- Type: Modular smartphone
- Form factor: Bar
- Data inputs: Touchscreen display
- Website: phonebloks.com

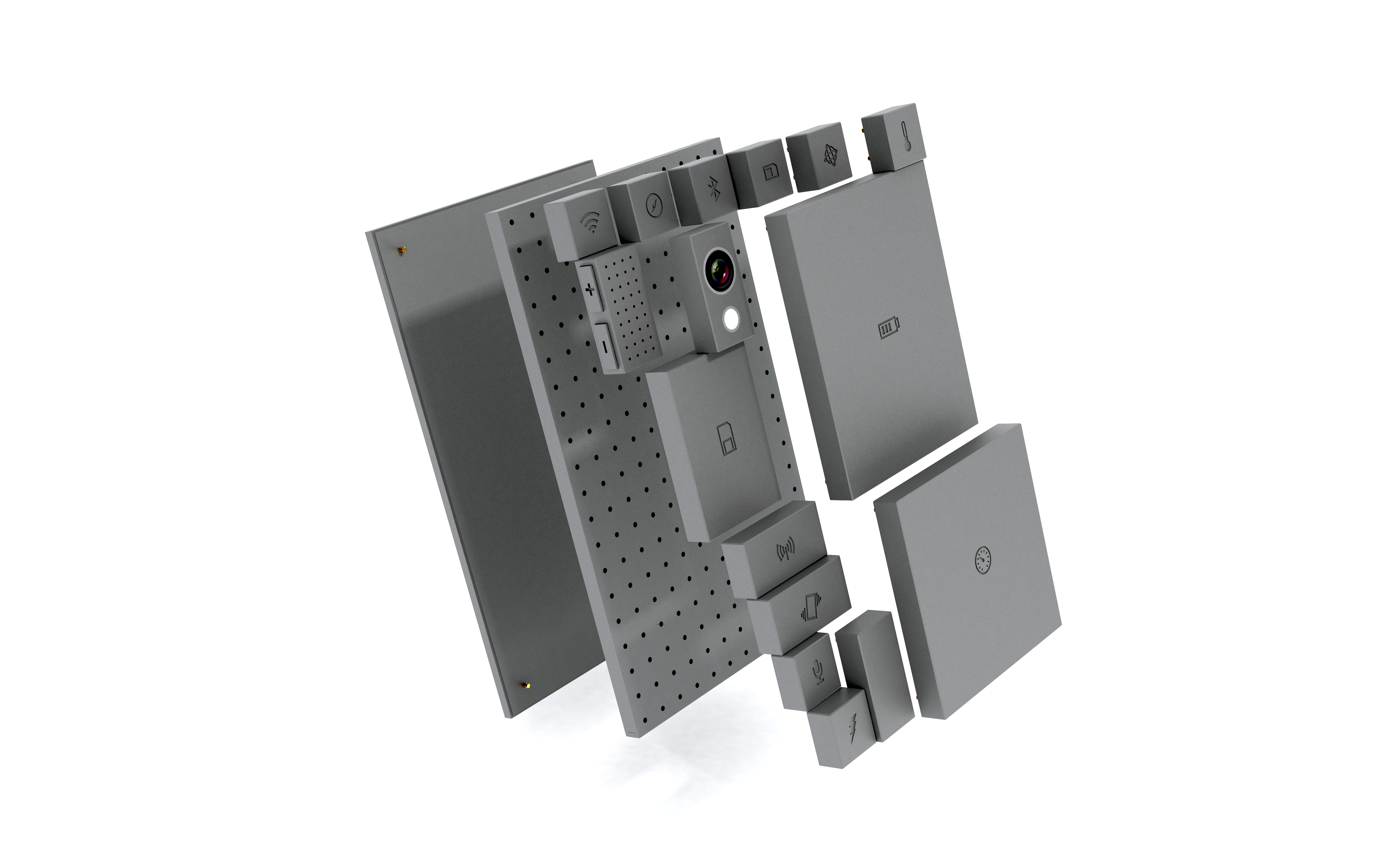
An exploded view of the Phonebloks concept.

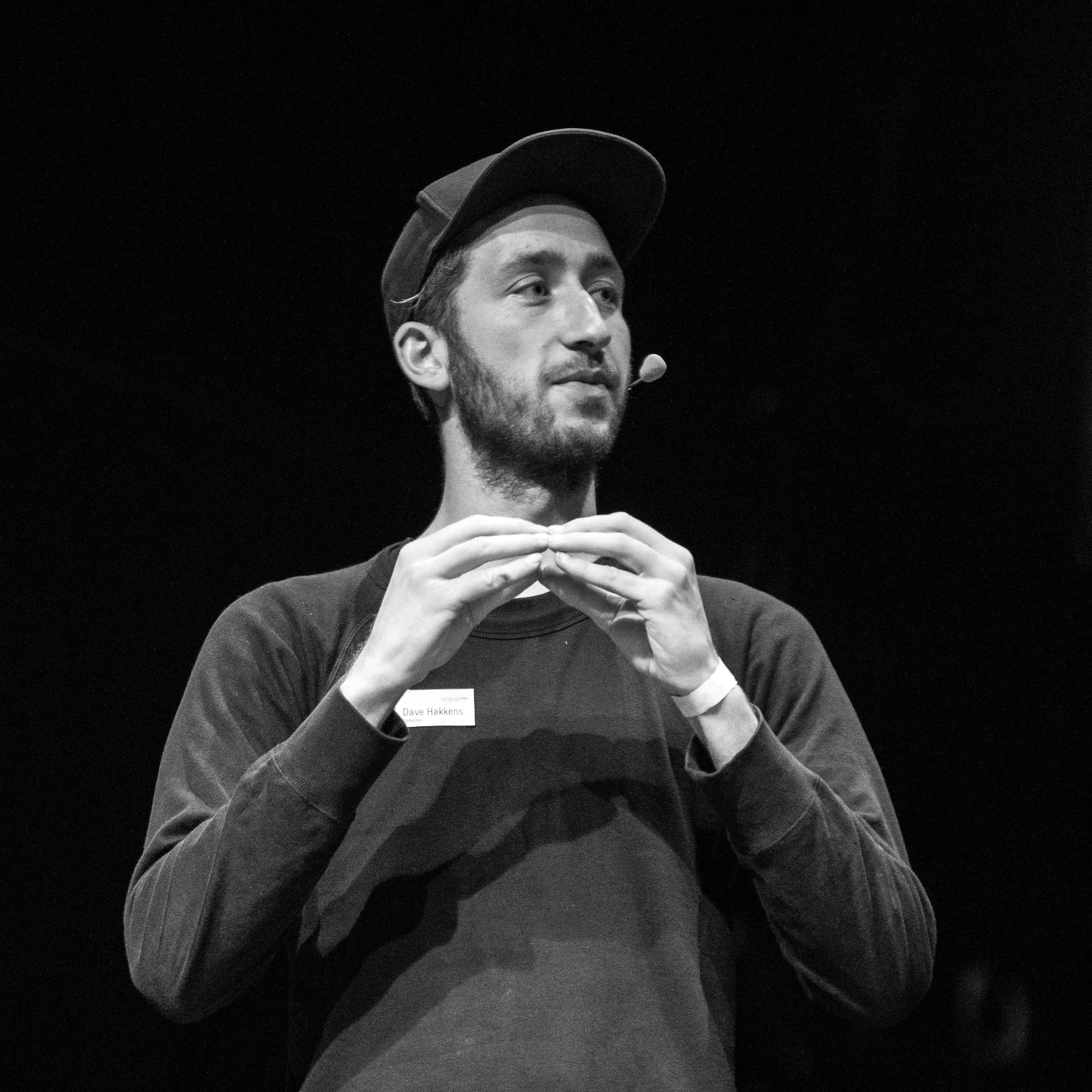
Dave Hakkens in 2017

Phonebloks is a modular smartphone concept created and designed by the Dutch designer Dave Hakkens in 2013, primarily to reduce electronic waste. While Phonebloks is not the first attempt at modular design in a phone, it is notable due to the extent of its modularity and the attention and support it has gained. By attaching individual third-party components (called "bloks") to a main board, a user would create a personalized smartphone. These bloks can be exchanged at will to replace a broken blok, to upgrade an existing blok, or to expand the functionality of the phone into a specific direction. Bloks would be available in Blokstore, "an app store for hardware", where users could buy new and used bloks as well as sell back their old ones.

There is no plan to actually produce the Phonebloks design as a commercial product.

== Concept ==
Hakkens graduated cum laude from the Design Academy Eindhoven in summer 2013 with his idea for Phonebloks. Phonebloks consists of a main board onto which bloks could be snapped on by the user like Lego bricks. Each blok is responsible for a unique function of the phone, much like a desktop computer has a distinct sound card, graphics card, processor, monitor, and power supply. As a result, instead of replacing the entire phone when it becomes obsolete or broken, one could simply replace the defective or performance-limiting part. If the consumer wants a camera that suits their needs better, they could for example swap their small generic camera blok for a larger zoom camera from a manufacturer such as Nikon or Canon instead of buying a phone with a better camera. In theory, this would lead to fewer people throwing away their phones and contributing to the ever-increasing problem of electronic waste. Smartphones based on the Phonebloks system would be sold part by part, as well as in starter sets. When assembled, the phone would have a screen covering the entirety of the front, volume buttons and headphone jacks along the outer edge, and bloks clicked into the back, forming a rectangular block shape overall.

== Issues ==
While many people support the concept's development into an actual product, there are objections as to the concept's viability and ultimate impact.

=== Economic feasibility ===
One challenge this concept faces is the large amount of money and manufacturing required in order to make the Phonebloks system a viable competitor with other major smartphone developers. Without many manufacturers producing bloks, there would be a limited selection of bloks to choose from, taking away from the open-source appeal of the system.

=== Technical barriers ===
Because all bloks are external of the main board, signals between components have to travel for significantly longer distances. This extra distance could lead to drops in signal quality, lower data transfer speeds and increased power consumption due to added interfacing resistance. In addition, the quality of connection needed would require expensive Pogo pins and sockets, and developing a system to allow the user to arbitrarily place bloks would be very difficult. The end product would likely be much thicker than non-modular smartphones, and the bloks would be at risk of dislodging from the main board.

RF design of a modular phone would be a challenge. Antennas integrated into the main body of the phone would require RF routing to the RF modem(s) in the modules and could limit the frequencies on which the phone could operate, necessitating different phones for different networks. Antennas integrated into modules could be less efficient due to limited space and EM interactions with adjacent modules, limiting range.

=== Potential increase of e-waste ===
Despite Hakkens' stated goal of lessening electronic waste, critics have argued that, if put into practice, the concept could actually increase e-waste output. They argue that by producing constantly better components, the consumer would have more pressure on them to replace several parts every few months; frequent replacement of bloks could add up to more waste on average than getting a new phone every two years.

== Implementation ==
After exceeding his goal of 900,000 supporters on Thunderclap by October 2013, Hakkens started collaborating with Motorola on Project Ara, a more practical modular smartphone system consisting of an endoskeleton with slots on the back where bloks can slide in. Hakkens encourages the supporters of Phonebloks to stay involved in the design process. However, this project was later cancelled.
