= Saturation (magnetic) =

Feature of some magnetic materials

Magnetization curves of 9 ferromagnetic materials, showing saturation.: 1. sheet steel; 2. silicon steel; 3. cast steel; 4. tungsten steel; 5. magnet steel; 6. cast iron; 7. nickel; 8. cobalt; 9. magnetite

Seen in some magnetic materials, saturation is the state reached when an increase in applied external magnetic field H cannot increase the magnetization of the material further, so the total magnetic flux density B more or less levels off. (Though, magnetization continues to increase very slowly with the field due to paramagnetism.) Saturation is a characteristic of ferromagnetic and ferrimagnetic materials, such as iron, nickel, cobalt and their alloys. Different ferromagnetic materials have different saturation levels.

== Description ==
Saturation is most clearly seen in the magnetization curve (also called BH curve or hysteresis curve) of a substance, as a bending to the right of the curve (see graph at right). As the H field increases, the B field approaches a maximum value asymptotically, the saturation level for the substance. Technically, above saturation, the B field continues increasing, but at the paramagnetic rate, which is several orders of magnitude smaller than the ferromagnetic rate seen below saturation.

The relation between the magnetizing field H and the magnetic field B can also be expressed as the magnetic permeability: $\mu = B / H$ or the relative permeability $\mu_r = \mu/\mu_0$, where $\mu_0$ is the vacuum permeability. The permeability of ferromagnetic materials is not constant, but depends on H. In saturable materials the relative permeability increases with H to a maximum, then as it approaches saturation decreases toward one.

Different materials have different saturation levels. For example, high permeability iron alloys used in transformers reach magnetic saturation at 1.6–2.2 teslas (T), whereas ferrites saturate at 0.2–0.5 T. Some amorphous alloys saturate at 1.2–1.3 T. Mu-metal saturates at around 0.8 T.

Due to saturation, the magnetic permeability μ_{f} of a ferromagnetic substance reaches a maximum and then declines

== Explanation ==
Ferromagnetic materials (like iron) are composed of microscopic regions called magnetic domains, that act like tiny permanent magnets that can change their direction of magnetization. Before an external magnetic field is applied to the material, the domains' magnetic fields are oriented in random directions, effectively cancelling each other out, so the net external magnetic field is negligibly small. When an external magnetizing field H is applied to the material, it penetrates the material and aligns the domains, causing their tiny magnetic fields to turn and align parallel to the external field, adding together to create a large magnetic field B which extends out from the material. This is called magnetization. The stronger the external magnetic field H, the more the domains align, yielding a higher magnetic flux density B. Eventually, at a certain external magnetic field, the domain walls have moved as far as they can, and the domains are as aligned as the crystal structure allows them to be, so there is negligible change in the domain structure on increasing the external magnetic field above this. The magnetization remains nearly constant, and is said to have saturated. The domain structure at saturation depends on the temperature.

== Effects and uses ==
Saturation puts a practical limit on the maximum magnetic fields achievable in ferromagnetic-core electromagnets and transformers of around 2 T, which puts a limit on the minimum size of their cores. This is one reason why high power motors, generators, and utility transformers are physically large; to conduct the large amounts of magnetic flux necessary for high power production, they must have large magnetic cores. In applications in which the weight of magnetic cores must be kept to a minimum, such as transformers and electric motors in aircraft, a high saturation alloy such as Permendur is often used.

In electronic circuits, transformers and inductors with ferromagnetic cores operate nonlinearly when the current through them is large enough to drive their core materials into saturation. This means that their inductance and other properties vary with changes in drive current. In linear circuits this is usually considered an unwanted departure from ideal behavior. When AC signals are applied, this nonlinearity can cause the generation of harmonics and intermodulation distortion. To prevent this, the level of signals applied to iron core inductors must be limited so they don't saturate. To lower its effects, an air gap is created in some kinds of transformer cores. The saturation current, the current through the winding required to saturate the magnetic core, is given by manufacturers in the specifications for many inductors and transformers.

On the other hand, saturation is exploited in some electronic devices. Saturation is employed to limit current in saturable-core transformers, used in arc welding, and ferroresonant transformers which serve as voltage regulators. When the primary current exceeds a certain value, the core is pushed into its saturation region, limiting further increases in secondary current. In a more sophisticated application, saturable core inductors and magnetic amplifiers use a DC current through a separate winding to control an inductor's impedance. Varying the current in the control winding moves the operating point up and down on the saturation curve, controlling the alternating current through the inductor. These are used in variable fluorescent light ballasts, and power control systems.

Saturation is also exploited in fluxgate magnetometers and fluxgate compasses.

In some audio applications, saturable transformers or inductors are deliberately used to introduce distortion into an audio signal. Magnetic saturation generates odd-order harmonics, typically introducing third and fifth harmonic distortion to the lower and mid frequency range.

== See also ==
- Magnetic reluctance
- Permendur/Hiperco
