= Shift (company) =

German information technology company

SHIFT GmbH
- Company type: Private (GmbH)
- Industry: Telecommunications equipment; Consumer electronics
- Founded: November 24, 2014; 11 years ago
- Founder: Carsten Waldeck; Rolf Waldeck; Samuel Waldeck
- Headquarters: Campus 7, 34590 Wabern, Hesse, Germany
- Products: Smartphones; Tablets
- Website: www.shiftphones.com

Shift GmbH (styled as SHIFT) is a German smartphone and phablet manufacturer with its headquarters with design and development department in Wabern in Northern Hesse Germany and Production in China. The company focuses on fairness in manufacturing and sustainability through a modular design.

== Products ==
Its smartphone products are called shiftphones.

Following the same principles as the phones, a modular 13.3" tablet is also in the works, scheduled for release in 2022. It uses a Tiger Lake i5-processor, features a swappable battery and two M.2 slots, and will support Windows 10 and Linux.

== History ==
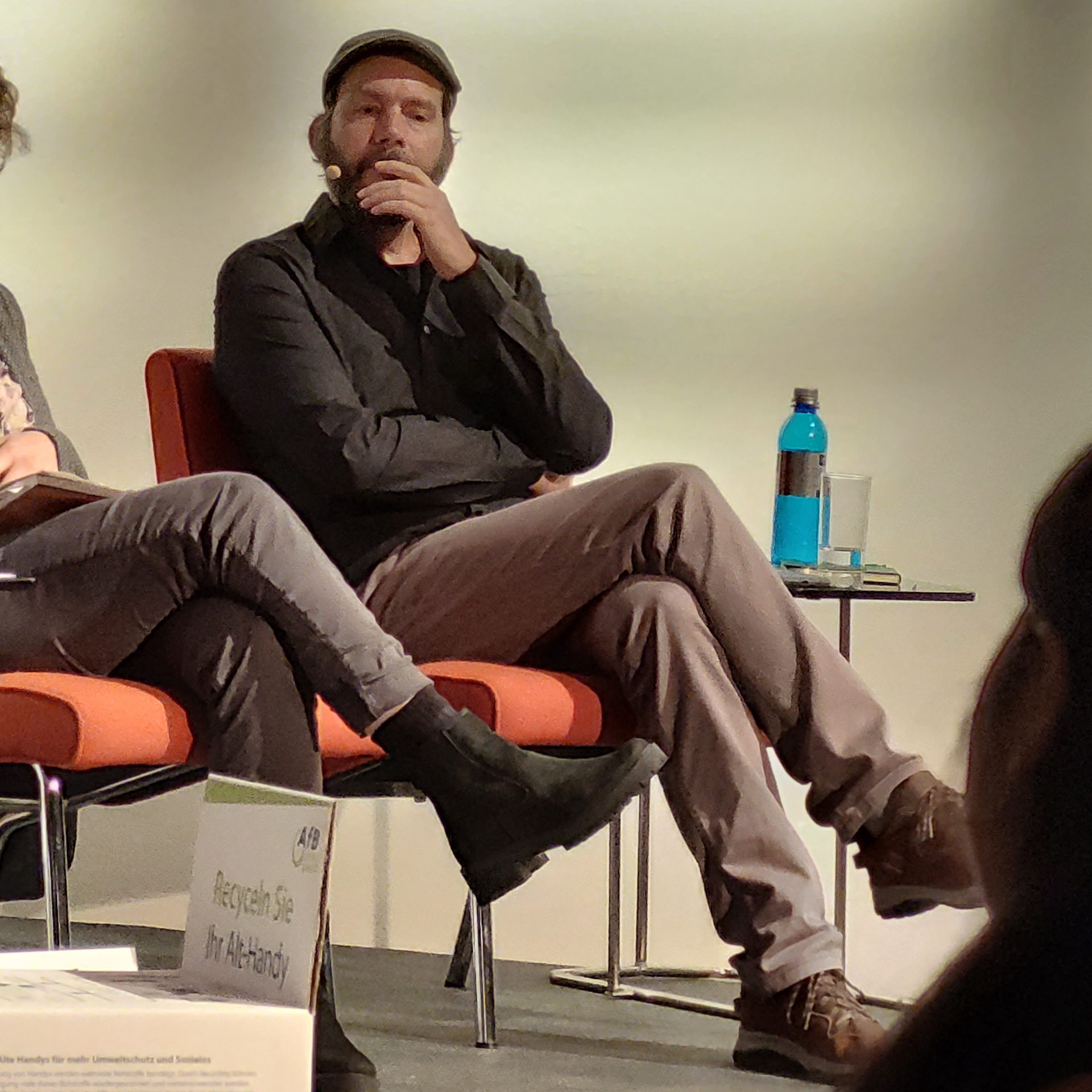
Founder Carsten Waldeck

Shift has been developing smartphones since 2014. In the beginning, brothers Carsten and Samuel Waldeck realized the project SHIFT7 through German crowdfunding platform Startnext. The brothers founded Shift GmbH, a company with limited liability regulated under German law. Further Shiftphones were launched with model series SHIFT4 and SHIFT5 in 2015.

The foundation of Shift was preceded by the crowdfunding of the smartphone shift7. The financing period was from April to July 2014 and was expected to raise €77,700, which was exceeded by one third and was therefore successful.

The company was officially founded in November of the same year and entered into the commercial register at the Amtsgericht Fritzlar.

In 2016 Shift became the first telecommunications equipment manufacturer to introduce a device deposit for all Shift products. In order to avoid waste, end users are to return defective devices to the company to ensure that they are disposed of properly or reused by second or third parties.

In June 2018, the company employs eleven people at its headquarters in Wabern and ten in Hangzhou, earning four times as much as the industry average in China.

By June 2019 Shift had sold 30,000 units.

The project grew into a small company with 15 employees in Germany, which collaborated with the Chinese production coordinator company "Vstar and Weihuaxin" in Shenzhen. Since 2018 the company has employed 10 workers in their own manufacturing facility in Hangzhou.

== Critiques ==
=== Doubts in the c't ===
Initially, doubts were expressed about the credibility of Shift's corporate goals, which were formulated as fair. The computer magazine c't, for example, raised doubts about the fairness of the companies smartphone Shift5.1 in its 9/2016 issue. The article points out that the founder Carsten Waldeck did not provide any documents to support his statements. Also, statements of the Fair Production Manifesto on the manufacturer's website are remarkably vague. Furthermore, the manifesto was written by Waldeck and "signed by 'Aaron, the founder and CEO of Vstar and Weihuaxin', a company based in Shenzen, China". The company, which according to c't von Waldeck is referred to as the "main partner", in turn has the shiftphones manufactured by another company. According to c't, the manifesto is thus merely "a declaration of intent by the shift-maker, not an investigation report by an at least halfway independent third party. The conclusion of the article is correspondingly harsh on Shift5.1: it should not be considered a fairphone alternative, but merely a typical cheap smartphone.

=== Mixed representation at Utopia ===
The german ecology online portal Utopia.de also described the efforts towards more sustainable production as "intransparent". Nevertheless, Shift5 was then included in a top list of ecological smartphones.

=== Further representations ===
In contrast, the magazine Digitale Welt writes that the company attaches just as much importance to environmentally friendly measures as it does to fair working conditions and reparability. The latter is achieved through the concept of modular construction of the devices, whose individual parts can be ordered by the user and repaired with commercially available tools and tutorials.

=== Reports after 2017 ===
More recent reports paint a clearer picture. Articles in other magazines have also been able to capture Carsten Waldeck's statements and prove their credibility accordingly. In June 2018, for example, golem.de of Computec Media reported in detail about the company and its efforts in the areas of sustainability and fairness.

ProSieben magazine Galileo also tested - also in June 2018 - the newly published Shift6m and used video recordings to illuminate the production conditions of the in-house Shift factory on site in China.

In September 2018, N-tv described the initial efforts towards fairness and sustainability as well as the history of the Shift phone's development.

The computer magazine c't found more positive words about the German smartphone manufacturer in issue 15/2018, although the reporting in the context of other European providers is very brief.

The ecology portal Utopia.de also no longer mentions intransparency in an article from August 2018. On December 7, 2018, Deutsche Welle headlines: "Smartphone and sustainability - is that possible? With the shiftphone it is!".
