= Permendur =

Cobalt-iron alloy

Permendur rods

Permendur is a cobalt-iron soft ferromagnetic alloy with equal parts of cobalt and iron which is notable for its high magnetic saturation level. Its saturation flux density of around 2.4 tesla is the highest of any commercially available metal. Coupled with its low coercivity and core losses, its high saturation and permeability makes Permendur useful as magnetic cores in transformers, electric generators and other electrical equipment. The advantage of high saturation in a magnetic core is that it can function at higher magnetic field strengths, so the core can be smaller and lighter for a given magnetic flux and power level. Permendur is used for magnetic cores and pole pieces in lightweight transformers and electric motors used in aircraft. The alloy was invented in 1929 by Gustav Elmen at Bell Telephone Laboratories. Various formulations are sold under different trade names.

Cobalt-iron alloys like permendur have very high Curie temperatures so they can function magnetically at high temperatures at which other ferromagnetic materials lose their magnetic properties. They are harder and less ductile than many other iron alloys and so are harder to fabricate, but have superior mechanical strength. Most permendur alloys require heat treatment after fabrication to attain the best magnetic properties.

The most important alloys are

- Permendur 2V (Vanadium Permendur, Permendur 49): Invented by White and Wahl in 1932, it is approximately 49% cobalt, 49% iron and 2% vanadium. The vanadium improves ductility and workability.
- Supermendur (Hiperco 50): Invented by Gould and Wenny in 1957, it has similar composition to Permendur 49 but is grain-oriented so it has a square hysteresis loop and much lower core losses, for better performance in transformers. Current formulations include trace amounts of niobium, silicon and manganese to improve cold-forming properties.

The coercivity can be controlled by varying the vanadium concentration. Equiatomic cobalt-iron alloys with more vanadium than permendur, 2-5%, are called Remendur. This is a medium-coercivity magnet material which bridges the gap between Permendur and Vicalloy cobalt-iron magnets with 8-15% vanadium.
