= Electropermanent magnet =

Bistable permanent magnet

Animated simulation of an electropermanent magnet (EPM) switching between ON and OFF states by reversing the AlNiCo magnetization, showing the change in magnetic flux lines and holding force on a 1018 steel workpiece.

An electropermanent magnet (EPM) is a type of permanent magnet in which the external magnetic field can be switched on or off by a pulse of electric current in a wire winding around part of the magnet. The magnet consists of two sections, one of "hard" (high coercivity) magnetic material and one of "soft" (low coercivity) material. The direction of magnetization in the latter piece can be switched by a pulse of current in a wire winding about the former. When the magnetically soft and hard materials have opposing magnetizations, the magnet produces no net external field across its poles, while when their direction of magnetization is aligned the magnet produces an external magnetic field.

Before the electropermanent magnet was invented, applications needing a controllable magnetic field required electromagnets, which consume large amounts of power when operating. Electropermanent magnets require no power source to maintain the magnetic field. Electropermanent magnets made with powerful rare-earth magnets are used as industrial lifting (tractive) magnets to lift heavy ferrous metal objects; when the object reaches its destination the magnet can be switched off, releasing the object. Programmable magnets are also being researched as a means of creating self-building structures.

== Description ==
An electropermanent magnet is a special configuration of magnetic materials where the external magnetic field can be turned on and off by applying a current pulse. The EPM is based on a common magnetic configuration called magnetic latch. A general example of this configuration assembly is built by a permanent magnet block with two plates of soft magnetic materials (generally iron alloys) on each side of the block. Those two plates exceed the dimensions of the permanent magnet. Because the plates had a higher permeability than the air, they will concentrate the magnetic flux of the permanent magnet. When a third (external) soft magnet plate is placed touching the other two plates, the magnetic flux will flow confined in the soft magnetic plates creating a closed magnetic circuit and the magnetic field produced by the magnet will be maximum (approximately the magnet remanence).

An EPM has at least two permanent magnets in between the plates. The magnetic field generated by the EPM is produced by the permanent magnets not by electric currents and this is the main difference with the electromagnets. An EPM uses only a pulse of current to magnetize one of the magnet in a desired direction (turning on and off the external magnetic field of the latch). After changing the direction of the magnet no current is needed and the field will return to depends on the permanent magnets.

== Electropermanent magnet principle ==
In order to explain the principle of the EPM, the configuration on the following picture is presented. Two permanent magnets are assembled with two U-shape (horseshoe) iron bars. If the north pole of both magnets are pointing up we will have the configuration described on the left: The iron U in the top will see two norths on its ends and will concentrate the flux lines but it won't be able to contain the magnetic flux and the flux will flow through the air and will try to find the other iron U. In a general schema, the iron U on top will become a north pole of the big magnet and the bottom iron U will become a south pole. In this configuration we can say there is big magnet ON.

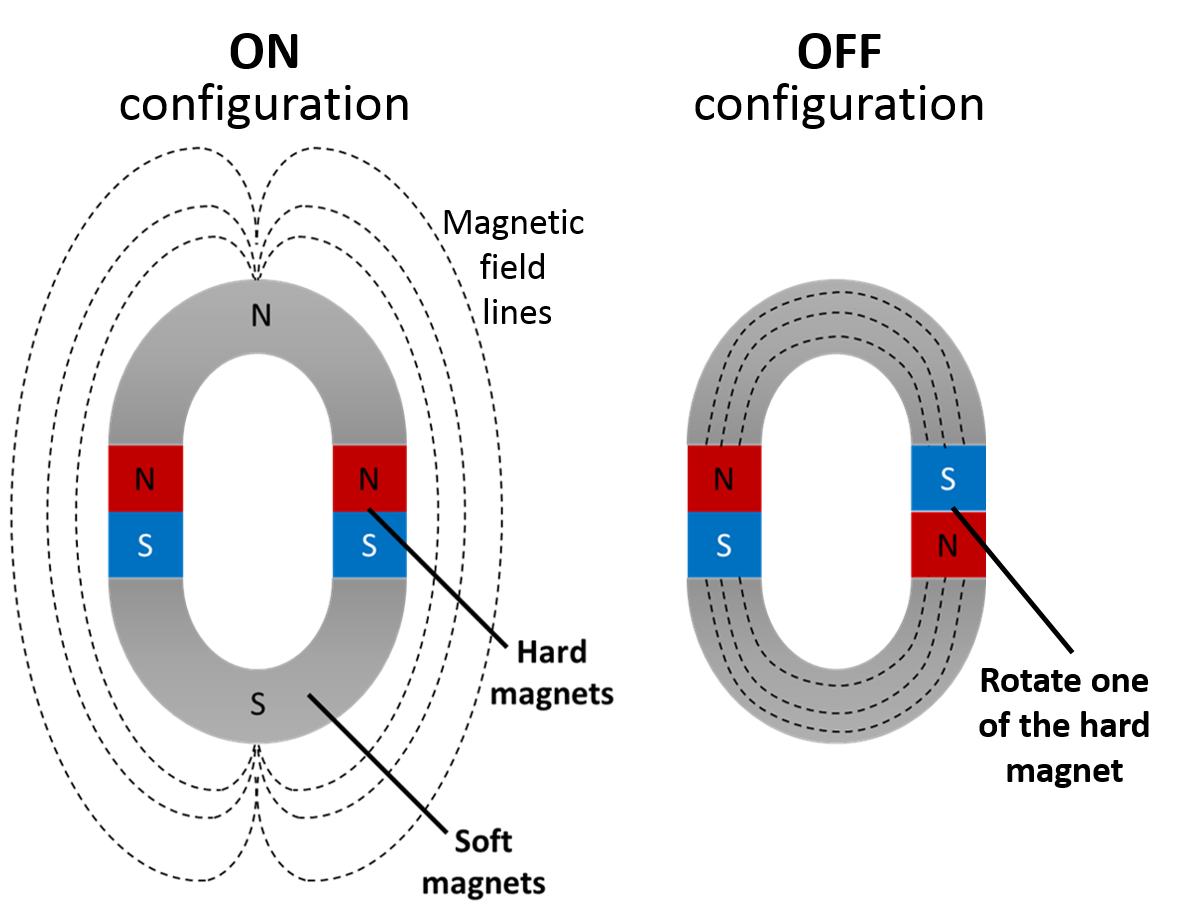
Representation of a magnetic latch configuration that can turn the external magnetic field ON and OFF by rotating one of the magnets.

If we rotate one of the hard magnets (north pole point down), the iron U on top will see a north pole and a south pole. The other iron U will see exactly the opposite. In this way almost all the magnetic flux will be concentrated inside both iron U's creating a close circuit for the magnetic field (because the high permeability of the iron). Having all the flux confined inside the structure, the magnetic flux outside became almost nonexistent. In this configuration we can say the big magnet is OFF.

Now we can move forward and instead of mechanically rotating one of the magnets we can flip the direction of its magnetization. To do it we can build the configuration on the following picture:

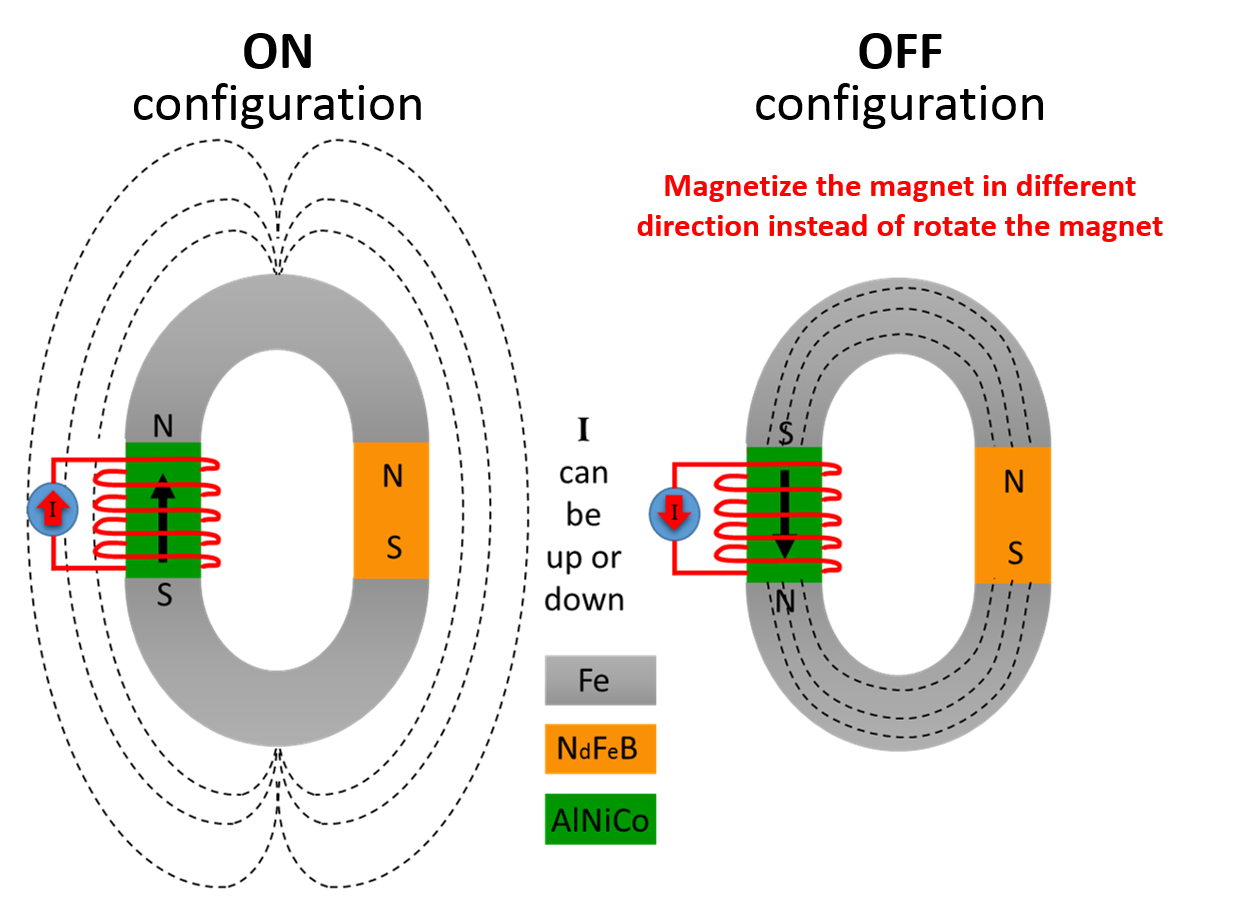
EPM principle. Representation of a magnetic latch configuration where the external magnetic field can be turned ON and OFF by reversing the magnetization direction of one of the magnets by action of the current in the coil.

A coil is wound around one of the magnets in a way that if we inject enough current (in a pulse) in the solenoid the generated magnetic field inside will be higher than the intrinsic coercivity of the magnet ($H_{ci}$). If this is the case the permanent magnet will be magnetized in the direction of the field inside the solenoid. Applying the same pulse of current in the opposite direction will lead to magnetize the magnet in the opposite direction. Therefore, we have the same behavior as when we mechanically rotate the magnet. This configuration is the concept of electropermanent magnet: Using a pulse of current we reverse the magnetization direction of one of the magnets and we will turn ON and OFF the external magnetic field.

It is important to mention that both magnets can be wound in the same coil, but it is necessary that one of the magnets have much lower intrinsic coercivity than the other in order to flip their magnetization direction without changing the other's direction of magnetization. During this explanation we use one magnet made of NdFeB and the other made of AlNiCo because both materials had the same remanence (around 1.3T) but AlNiCo has a lower intrinsic coercivity of 50kA/m while NdFeB has an intrinsic coercivity of 1120kA/m.

== Magnetic circuit analysis ==
Using a magnetic circuit analysis we can represent a simple EPM using the following schematic:

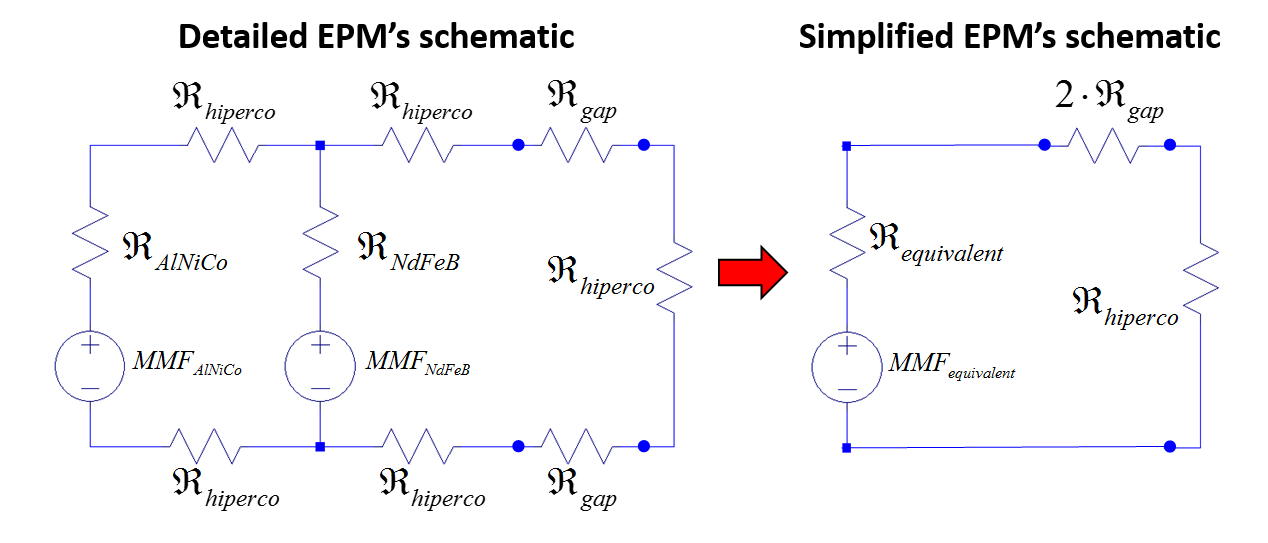
Detailed and simplified schematic of the EPM's magnetic circuit.

We present two permanent magnets made of different materials (AlNiCo and NdFeB) and the soft magnet is made of Hiperco. An additional segment of hiperco is shown to close the circuit and obtains better calculated results. An air gap is included (One for each side of the EPM) for calculating the magnetic flux and field generated in the air as function of the gap distance. This will lead to obtain an expression of the EPM's force (exerted over the additional segment of hiperco) as a function of the separation distance.

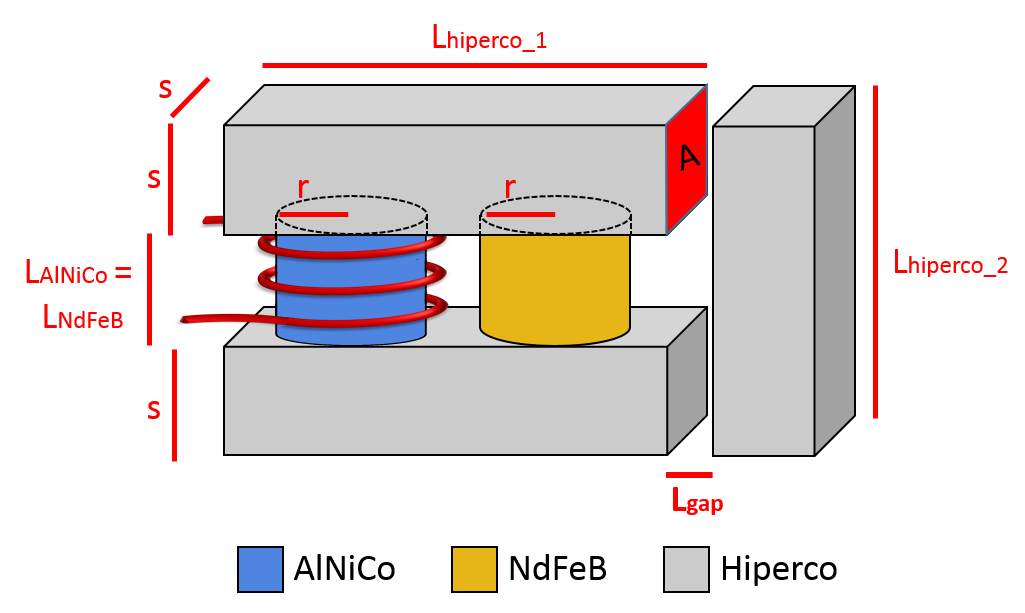
Design concept of an EPM.

For the calculation of the values of the components in the circuit we will assume that all the areas in the flow have the same dimensions. If the selected magnets had a cylindrical shape then the area of the flow for the magnets will be $A = \pi \sdot r^2$ and the hiperco blocks will have a square section of side $s = r \sdot \sqrt{\pi}$ in order to have the same area.

For the AlNiCo magnet we can calculate the magnetomotive force (MMF), the reluctance $\mathcal{R}$ and the magnetic flow over that magnet as:

$$MMF_{AlNiCo} = H_{C-AlNiCo} \sdot L_{AlNiCo}$$

$$\mathcal{R}_{AlNiCo} = \frac{L_{AlNiCo}}{\frac{ B_{r-AlNiCo}}{H_{C-AlNiCo}} \sdot A}$$

$$\Phi_{AlNiCo} = \frac{MMF_{AlNiCo}}{\mathcal{R}_{AlNiCo}}$$

For the NdFeB magnet we can calculate the magnetomotive force (MMF), the reluctance $\mathcal{R}$ and the magnetic flow over that magnet in the same way:

$$MMF_{NdFeB} = H_{C-NdFeB} \sdot L_{NdFeB}$$

$$\mathcal{R}_{NdFeB} = \frac{L_{NdFeB}}{\frac{ B_{r-NdFeB}}{H_{C-NdFeB}} \sdot A}$$

$$\Phi_{NdFeB} = \frac{MMF_{NdFeB}}{\mathcal{R}_{NdFeB}}$$

Expressions for the reluctance $\mathcal{R}$ of the gap and the hiperco can be also generated:

$$\mathcal{R}_{gap} = \frac{L_{gap}}{\mu_{0} \sdot A}$$

$$\mathcal{R}_{hiperco} = \frac{L_{hiperco}}{\mu_{r-hiperco} \sdot A}$$

But the magnetic circuit can be simplified by using electric source transformations and considering all the hiperco in only one big reluctance (mainly because the value of those small pieces of reluctance are negligible compared with the reluctance of the permanent magnets). A simplified version of the magnetic circuit was presented on the right in the picture above:

An equivalent reluctance ($\mathcal{R}_{equivalent}$) can be calculated to replace the magnets:

$$\mathcal{R}_{equivalent} = \left ( \frac{1}{\mathcal{R}_{NdFeB}} + \frac{1}{\mathcal{R}_{AlNiCo}} \right )^{-1}$$

For the equivalent MMF, there are going to be two different values. One when the EPM is ON and both flows are in the same direction (addition):

EPM ON:

$$\color{green} MMF_{equivalent} =\mathcal{R}_{equivalent} \sdot \left (\Phi_{NdFeB}+\Phi_{AlNiCo} \right )$$

And another one when the EPM is OFF and the magnetic fluxes are in opposite direction (subtraction)

EPM OFF:

$$\color{red} MMF_{equivalent} =\mathcal{R}_{equivalent} \sdot \left (\Phi_{NdFeB}-\Phi_{AlNiCo} \right )$$

Knowing the value of the MMF for the two stages of the EPM and the equivalent components, we can continue calculating the magnetic flux and the magnetic flux density (B):

$$\Phi_{gap} = \frac{MMF_{equivalent}}{2 \sdot \mathcal{R}_{gap} + \mathcal{R}_{hiperco} + \mathcal{R}_{equivalent}}$$

$$\mathbf{B}_{gap} = \frac{\Phi_{gap}}{A}$$

The original formula for force between two magnetized surfaces without fringing is well known, and presented below. In the formula the force is divided by 2. Since we are going to calculate the force for the two areas corresponding to the gaps then the equation to calculate the force as a function of the gap distance looks like:

$$\mathbf{F}_{(gap-distance)} = \frac{(\mathbf{B}_{gap})^2 \sdot A}{\mu_{0}}$$

== EPM design ==
=== Magnetization coil fabrication ===
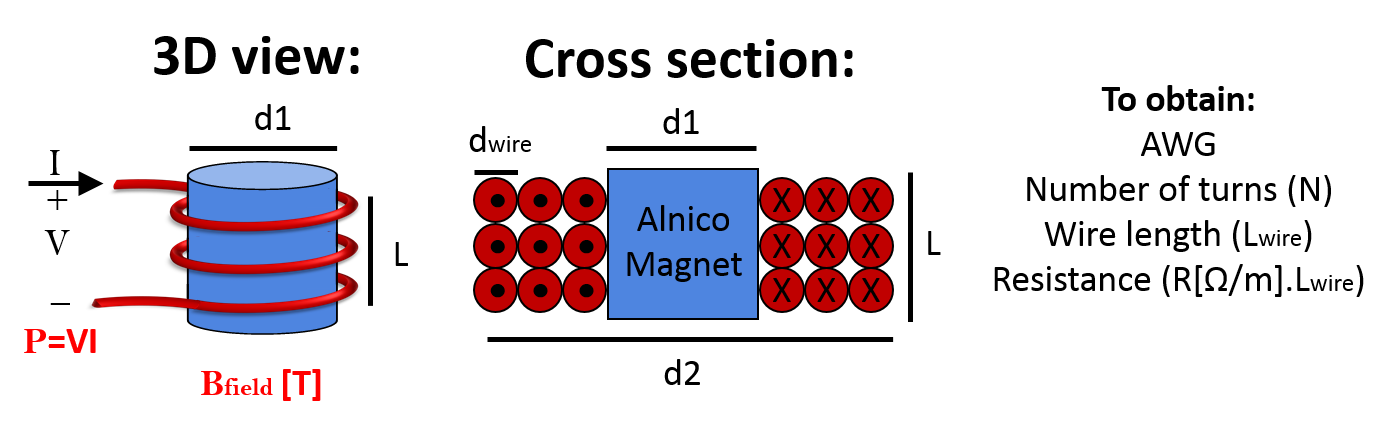
Design parameters for the magnetization coil in an EPM.

The first and most important step is to design the solenoid that will create the magnetic field to reverse the magnetization of the AlNiCo. As mentioned before the AlNiCo has an intrinsic coercivity of 50kA/m so it is necessary to create a field of at least: $B_{apply} = \mu_{0}H_{ci}=62.8mT$. It is recommended to design the field 3 times higher than the intrinsic coercivity to fully magnetize a material. Picture below depicts the coil design parameters:

The next step to complete the design is to calculate the B field in the middle point of the coil using the equations for thick solenoids (knowing:$B_{z} = \mu_{0}H_{z}$):

$$H_{z}(0) = \frac{N \sdot i}{D_2-D_1} \sdot ln\left ( \frac{D_2 +\sqrt{{D_2}^2+L^2}}{D_1 +\sqrt{{D_1}^2+L^2}} \right )$$

Then, it is necessary to calculate the length of the wire and the number of turns that we are going to use in the solenoid. The equations provided by Princeton physics was used so N is the number of turns and L is the wire length:

$$N = \frac{L}{d_{wire}} \sdot \frac{(D_2-D_1)}{2 \sdot d_{wire}}$$

$$L_{wire} = 0.515 \sdot N \sdot \pi \sdot (D_2+D_1)$$

Using the AWG table provided by, for different wires, it is possible to create a spread sheet with the diameter of the different wires and the maximum current they can handle (Maximum amps for power transmission).

To solve this problem it is necessary to fix D1, the solenoid length to L and the current to the maximum value permitted for each wire. This simplify the optimization problem leading to calculate Bz by changing D2. Using solver function in the spreadsheet, this value can be calculated.

After this it is possible to include parameters for the resistance (copper resistance in mΩ/m multiply by the wire length), the power as $P=I^2 \sdot R$ and the voltage as $V=P / I$. A different value for each AWG wire gauge will be generated and the voltage and power to obtain the desired Bz at a maximum current must be calculated. By inspection it is possible to find the wire with minimal power consumption.

The last step to design the coil is plot the B field inside the coil as a function of the position inside the coil. We will use the full version of the equation for thick solenoids and making z variate between -L/2 and L/2:

$$H_{z}(Z) = \frac{N \sdot i}{2L \sdot (D_2-D_1)} \sdot \left [ (L+2z) \sdot ln \left ( \frac{D_2 +\sqrt{{D_2}^2+(L+2z)^2}}{D_1 +\sqrt{{D_1}^2+(L+2z)^2}} \right )+(L-2z) \sdot ln \left ( \frac{D_2 +\sqrt{{D_2}^2+(L-2z)^2}}{D_1 +\sqrt{{D_1}^2+(L-2z)^2}} \right )    \right ]$$

=== Magnetic force calculations ===
Simulation of magnetic flux and holding force as the air gap between an EPM and a 1018 steel workpiece increases.

Using the formula for force mentioned earlier it is possible to plot the force as a function of the gap distance of the external hiperco bar. Two curves were obtained: one for the EPM in ON state and the other for the EPM in OFF state: If we plot those forces together it is possible to observe the difference of at least 4 orders of magnitude from the EPM when is ON and OFF (This plot is an example of EPM with two cylindrical magnets -one NdFeB and the other AlNiCo- of 1mm diameter and length. The soft magnet material is hiperco with square section bars of side 0.889mm to make the flux area equal to the one in the magnets):

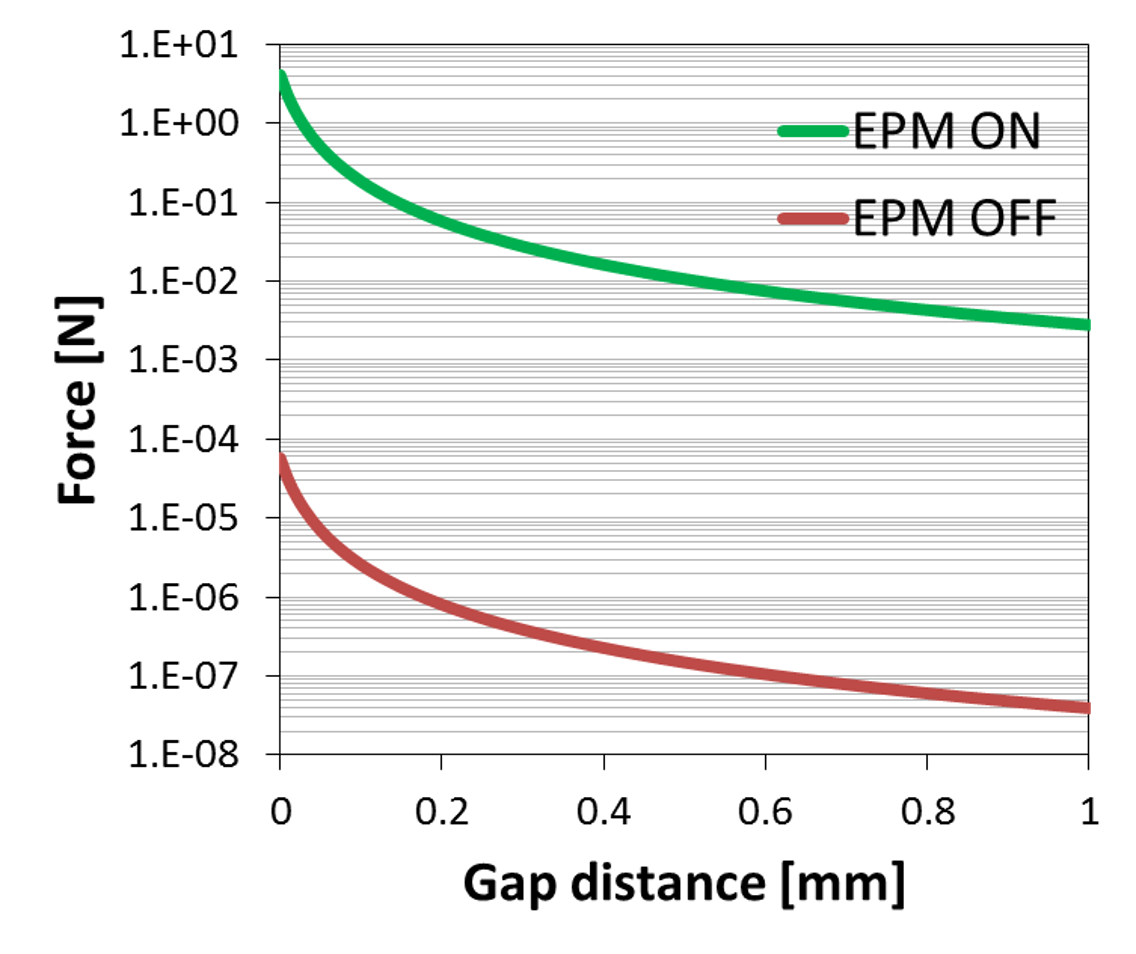
Plot of the forces between the EPM and the external bar as a function of the gap distance between them. For EPM ON and OFF.

=== Multiphysics simulations ===
An example of an EPM of $300 \mu m$ by $400 \mu m$ is simulated to verify the difference in the magnetic field when the EPM is ON and OFF. This simulation was made using finite element approach by the software COMSOL Multiphysics. The picture below shows a simulation of the Magnetic Flux density Field (B) for the EPM ON and OFF (with a calculation of the flux in that specific plane) and below shows multiple cross section measurements of the flux density on top of the EPM (ON and OFF as well). The simulations shown that there are at least 4 orders of magnitude of difference in the external magnetic fields between the two operation modes confirming the magnetic circuit model.

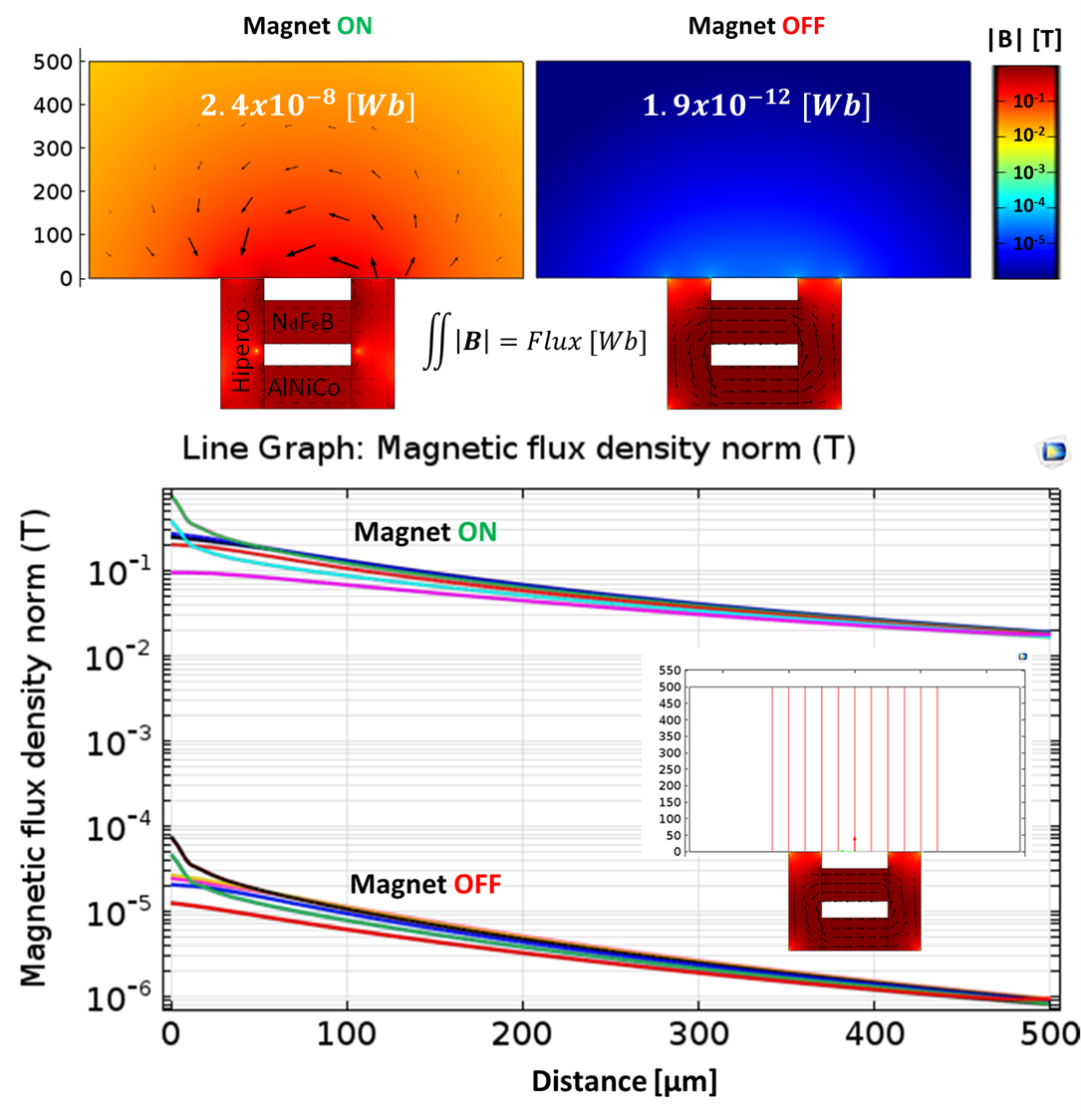
Multiphysics simulation (COMSOL Multiphysics) of the EPM for On and OFF stage.

== Applications ==
=== Project Ara ===
Project Ara was an open hardware initiative by Google to create a modular phone where all the components are interchangeable and can be replaced while the device is on. The project was originally announced as using EPMs as the method used to fasten the phone's modules to its endoskeleton. However, the project later announced that they were searching for replacement methods.

The project was suspended on 2 September 2016. Bob O’Donnell of TECHnalysis Research said, “This was a science experiment that failed, and they are moving on.”

=== Drone package delivery system ===
Gripping systems for drones have been developed using electropermanent magnets. Nicadrone's OpenGrab EPM v3 was the first of such systems but it is now obsolete. Zubax Robotics, an R&D company, developed the FluxGrip EPM as the next generation payload attachment module.

Related Videos:

- EPM for drones: 1
- EPM for drones: 2
- FluxGrip EPM system test

=== Reconfigurable matter ===
Using a dice of six sides and in each side include an EPM is the concept behind this Pebbles robots that are capable of interpret a simple shape and reproduce it by selecting which blocks must be attached to the other.

Related Videos:

- Reconfigurable matter

=== Logitech MX Master 3 mouse scroll wheel ===
The scroll wheel on this mouse uses a technology called “MagSpeed”: the mouse quickly switches between a typical ratcheting feel and a free-spinning mode. To rapidly switch between modes, the Logitech team engineered a little circuit that energizes a coil which energizes an EPM, which sits still within the internal cavity of the wheel, causing it to pull on the little teeth as they pass, giving the user the illusion of a mechanical detent. This EPM remains energized even when power is shut off. Using a magnet eliminates any mechanical wear over time as it was the case on previous versions of the mouse hardware, and since the magnet is electropermanent the power consumption is zero except when switching modes.

Related Article:

- Logitech MX Master 3 teardown

=== External links ===
- Self-sculpting sand robots are under development at MIT BBC News, April 2012.
- Electropermanent Cargo Gripper
- Zero Static Power Magnets for ProgrammableMatter
- Electropermanent Magnetic Connectors and Actuators
- The Electro-Permanent Magnet Company — EPM technology, simulations, and applications resource

== See also ==
- Magnet
- Electromagnet
- Magnetic base
- Variable Halbach array
