= Thunderclap (website) =

Former social gathering website

- Website type: Crowdspeaking
- Headquarters: New York City, New York State, U.S.
- Founder: David Cascino
- Website: thunderclap.it
- Launched: May, 2012
- Current status: Closed, July, 2018

Thunderclap was a platform that let individuals and companies rally people together to spread a message. The site used a model similar to crowdfunding sites such as Kickstarter, in that if the campaign did not meet its desired number of supporters in the given time frame, the organizer receives none of the donations. To each campaign there was assigned a url with a short version of Thunderclap domain name (thndr.me or thndr.it) and a unique random 6 alphanumeric path. This was referred to as "crowdspeaking", as Thunderclap and its rival site Daycause use the same terminology. Backers are required to copy the original message in tweets or social media posts. In August 2018, Facebook revoked Thunderclap's ability to post onto Facebook, making Thunderclap unsustainable to operate. Thunderclap announced that it would be shutting down in September 2018, along with Daycause. The closure came after Facebook changed its terms of service, blocking external apps from posting content.

== Overview ==
Thunderclap was owned by De-De, a New York City-based product development studio backed by Australian advertising executive David Droga. Site founder David Cascino said that the idea for the site came to him when he saw how an Occupy Wall Street protester's speech was amplified by the crowd repeating the speech verbatim.

Campaigns included activism, fundraising, films, creative projects, and product launches. Thunderclap campaigns were run by the White House, Major League Baseball, People, Levi's, Durex, Toms Shoes, Sony Pictures, the Discovery Channel, Mozilla, BBC, and the United Nations.
