= Formula SAE Australasia =

Australasian Formula SAE student engineering competition

- Category: Student engineering competition
- Country: Australia
- Inaugural season: 2000
- Classes: Internal Combustion (IC), Electric Vehicle (EV), Autonomous (AV)
- Constructors: University student teams
- Drivers' champion: (2025 class winners): Edith Cowan University (IC); University of Canterbury (EV)
- Official website: www.saea.com.au/formula-sae-a

Formula SAE-Australasia (FSAE-A, also styled Formula SAE Australasia) is an annual student design competition in which university teams design, build, and compete with single-seat, formula-style race cars. It is hosted by the Society of Automotive Engineers – Australasia (SAE-A) and held in Australia. The competition is run under rules based on those of the international Formula SAE series, organised by SAE International. It has been held annually since its inception in 2000, with the exceptions of 2020 and 2021, when it was cancelled due to the COVID-19 pandemic.

The competition includes Internal Combustion (IC), Electric Vehicle (EV), and Autonomous (driverless) classes. Teams are judged on a combination of static events (cost, business presentation, and engineering design) and dynamic events (acceleration, skid pad, autocross, endurance, and efficiency). Between 20 and 35 teams take part each year, including international entries from countries such as New Zealand, Germany, Spain, Japan, Taiwan, India, the United Kingdom, and the United States. The Australasian event uses the international Formula SAE rules with a local addendum issued by SAE-A.

== History ==
The first Formula SAE-Australasia competition was held in 2000 at the Ford Proving Ground, with ten teams (six local and four international) participating. It was won by the University of Texas at Arlington. Subsequent early competitions were hosted at automotive industry test facilities in Victoria, including the Holden, Toyota, and Mitsubishi proving grounds, before the competition settled at the Victorian University Test Facility from 2005 to 2013. From 2014 to 2025 the event was held at motor racing circuits in Victoria, alternating between Calder Park Raceway and Winton Motor Raceway. In 2026 the competition relocated to The Bend Motorsport Park in South Australia under a five-year hosting agreement with Business Events Adelaide.

An Electric Vehicle class was introduced in 2010, with two local teams entering in its debut year. Electric entries have grown steadily since, and from 2017 onward EV entries have generally equalled or exceeded IC entries. An Autonomous (driverless) class was added in 2022, mirroring the introduction of similar driverless classes at international Formula Student competitions in the late 2010s.

The 2020 and 2021 events were cancelled due to the COVID-19 pandemic in Australia. The competition resumed in December 2022 at Winton Motor Raceway with 29 teams across IC, EV, and Autonomous classes.

== Format ==
Formula SAE-A is run as a four-day event, typically held in early to mid-December. The 2026 competition is scheduled for 7–10 December 2026 at The Bend Motorsport Park (Shell V-Power Motorsport Park), Tailem Bend, South Australia, and includes IC, EV, and Autonomous classes.

The premise, common to Formula SAE-derived competitions worldwide, is that a fictional manufacturing company has engaged a student design team to develop a small formula-style race car aimed at the non-professional weekend autocross driver. The vehicle is then evaluated as a potential production prototype. Each team designs, builds, tests, and races their own car, with the work performed by enrolled university students.

=== Classes ===
The competition is divided into three classes, each governed by the FSAE-A Local Rules Addendum to the international Formula SAE Rules:

- Internal Combustion (IC): cars powered by a four-stroke piston engine of no more than 710 cc, fitted with a circular intake air restrictor downstream of the throttle (20 mm for petrol, 19 mm for E85).
- Electric Vehicle (EV): battery-electric cars limited to 600 V DC and a maximum power draw of 80 kW, measured using an event-supplied energy meter.
- Autonomous (AV): self-driving cars completing a subset of the static and dynamic events without a driver. Vehicles may be dedicated AVs or "dual-purpose" cars also entered in the EV or IC class. For 2026, the AV class is run as a demonstration event scored separately from the EV/IC competition.

Teams may enter newly built vehicles or eligible second- or third-year cars carried over from a previous competition, subject to compliance with current safety rules.

=== Events and scoring ===
Like other Formula SAE-derived competitions, FSAE-A scoring is divided between static events (judged off-track) and dynamic events (run on-track). For the IC and EV classes the maximum score is 1,000 points, with the same allocation as the international Formula SAE Rules other than for the Cost and Design Events, which are governed by the local addendum.

FSAE-A IC and EV class scoring
| Event | Type | Points |
|---|---|---|
| Engineering Design | Static | 150 |
| Cost and Manufacturing | Static | 100 |
| Business Presentation | Static | 75 |
| Acceleration | Dynamic | 100 |
| Skid Pad | Dynamic | 75 |
| Autocross | Dynamic | 125 |
| Endurance | Dynamic | 275 |
| Efficiency | Dynamic | 100 |
| Total | | 1,000 |

The Autonomous class for 2026 is scored out of 425 points across one static and two dynamic events:

FSAE-A AV class scoring (2026)
| Event | Type | Points |
|---|---|---|
| AV Design | Static | 150 |
| AV Skidpad | Dynamic | 75 |
| AV Trackdrive | Dynamic | 200 |
| Total | | 425 |

The AV Trackdrive is run without a driver, and AV teams must additionally pass an Emergency Brake System (EBS) test demonstrating that the vehicle can be brought to a safe stop on a remote stop signal.

Endurance is the highest-weighted dynamic event. The Efficiency event is then scored from the energy used during Endurance — fuel consumed for IC vehicles, and net electrical energy drawn through the energy meter for EVs (with credit given for energy recovered through regenerative braking).

All vehicles must pass technical inspection before being permitted to attempt the dynamic events. EV and AV vehicles undergo additional class-specific inspections. Following the Endurance event, all vehicles are impounded in parc fermé for further inspection, where penalties may be applied for any non-compliance identified.

Additional specialty awards are presented each year by competition sponsors, including the Motorsport Australia Inspiring Motorsport Award, the LEAP Award for Best Use of Simulation, the SAE-A Harry Watson Award, the Technical Inspection Award, and the Caterpillar Automated Vehicle Drive Award.

== Venues ==
The competition has been hosted at a variety of venues, primarily in Victoria for most of its history before relocating to South Australia in 2026:

Formula SAE-A venues
| Years | Venue |
|---|---|
| 2000 | Ford Proving Ground |
| 2001 | Holden Proving Ground |
| 2002 | Toyota Test Facility |
| 2003 | Mitsubishi Proving Ground |
| 2004–2013 | Victorian University Test Facility |
| 2014–2017 | Calder Park Raceway |
| 2018–2019 | Winton Motor Raceway |
| 2022 | Winton Motor Raceway |
| 2023-2025 | Calder Park Raceway |
| 2026 | The Bend Motorsport Park |

== Results ==
=== Internal Combustion class winners ===
Overall IC class winners, 2000–present
| Year | Winner | Country |
|---|---|---|
| 2000 | University of Texas at Arlington | United States |
| 2001 | University of Leeds | United Kingdom |
| 2002 | University of Wollongong | Australia |
| 2003 | Georgia Institute of Technology | United States |
| 2004 | University of Wollongong | Australia |
| 2005 | University of Western Australia | Australia |
| 2006 | RMIT University | Australia |
| 2007 | University of Western Australia | Australia |
| 2008 | University of Stuttgart | Germany |
| 2009 | Monash University | Australia |
| 2010 | Monash University | Australia |
| 2011 | Monash University | Australia |
| 2012 | Monash University | Australia |
| 2013 | Monash University | Australia |
| 2014 | Monash University | Australia |
| 2015 | Monash University | Australia |
| 2016 | University of Wollongong | Australia |
| 2017 | Monash University | Australia |
| 2018 | Monash University | Australia |
| 2019 | Monash University | Australia |
| 2020 | Cancelled due to COVID-19 | |
| 2021 | Cancelled due to COVID-19 | |
| 2022 | University of Waikato | New Zealand |
| 2023 | Edith Cowan University | Australia |
| 2024 | RMIT University | Australia |
| 2025 | Edith Cowan University | Australia |

=== Electric Vehicle class winners ===
Overall EV class winners (since EV class introduced in 2010, first overall EV winner 2016)
| Year | Winner | Country |
|---|---|---|
| 2016 | Universitat Politècnica de Catalunya | Spain |
| 2017 | Monash University | Australia |
| 2018 | Technical University of Munich | Germany |
| 2019 | Monash University | Australia |
| 2020 | Cancelled due to COVID-19 | |
| 2021 | Cancelled due to COVID-19 | |
| 2022 | University of Auckland | New Zealand |
| 2023 | University of Canterbury | New Zealand |
| 2024 | Monash University | Australia |
| 2025 | University of Canterbury | New Zealand |

=== Participation by class ===
The number of entries has grown from 10 teams in the inaugural 2000 competition to a peak of 32 in 2016. Electric vehicle entries first matched IC entries in 2017 and have outnumbered them every year since 2019.

== See also ==
- Formula SAE — the parent United States competition
- Formula Student — the United Kingdom competition
- Formula Student Germany — the German competition (FSG), held at the Hockenheimring
- Formula Hybrid — hybrid-powertrain offshoot
- List of Formula SAE winners
- Student design competition
- SAE International
