= Fairphone 1 =

Smartphone designed and manufactured by Fairphone

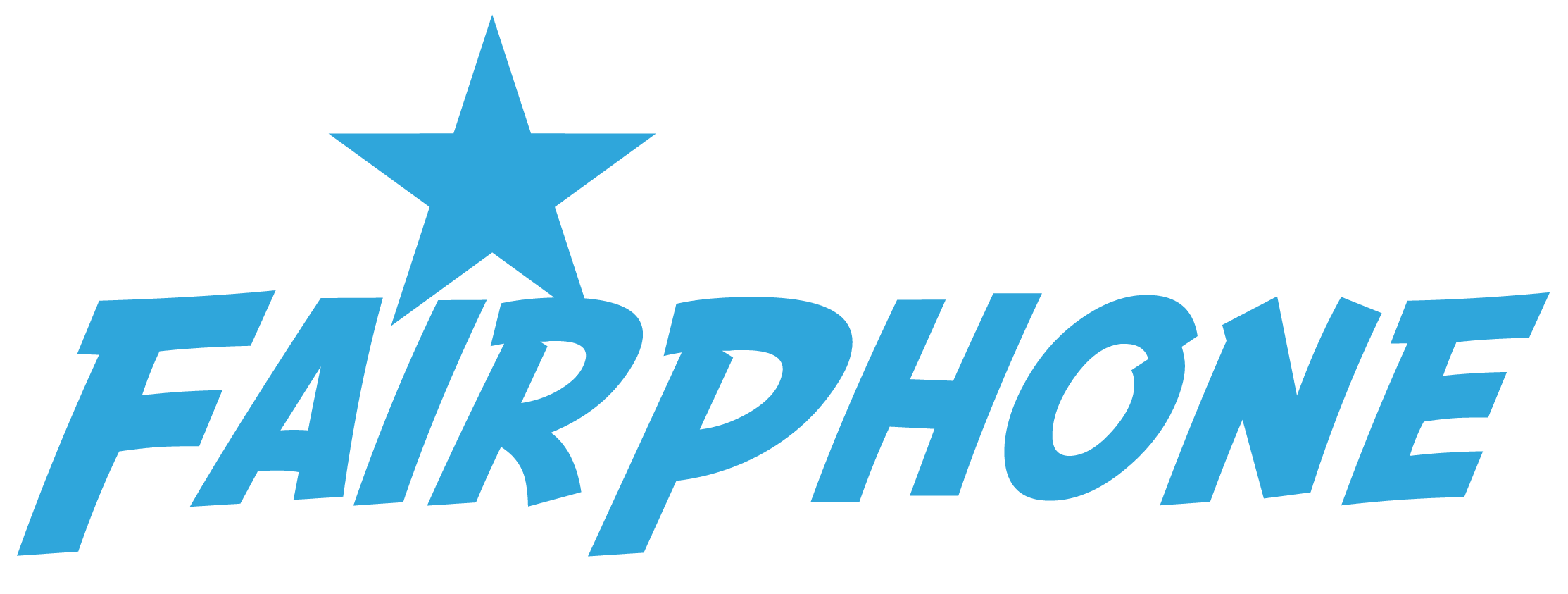

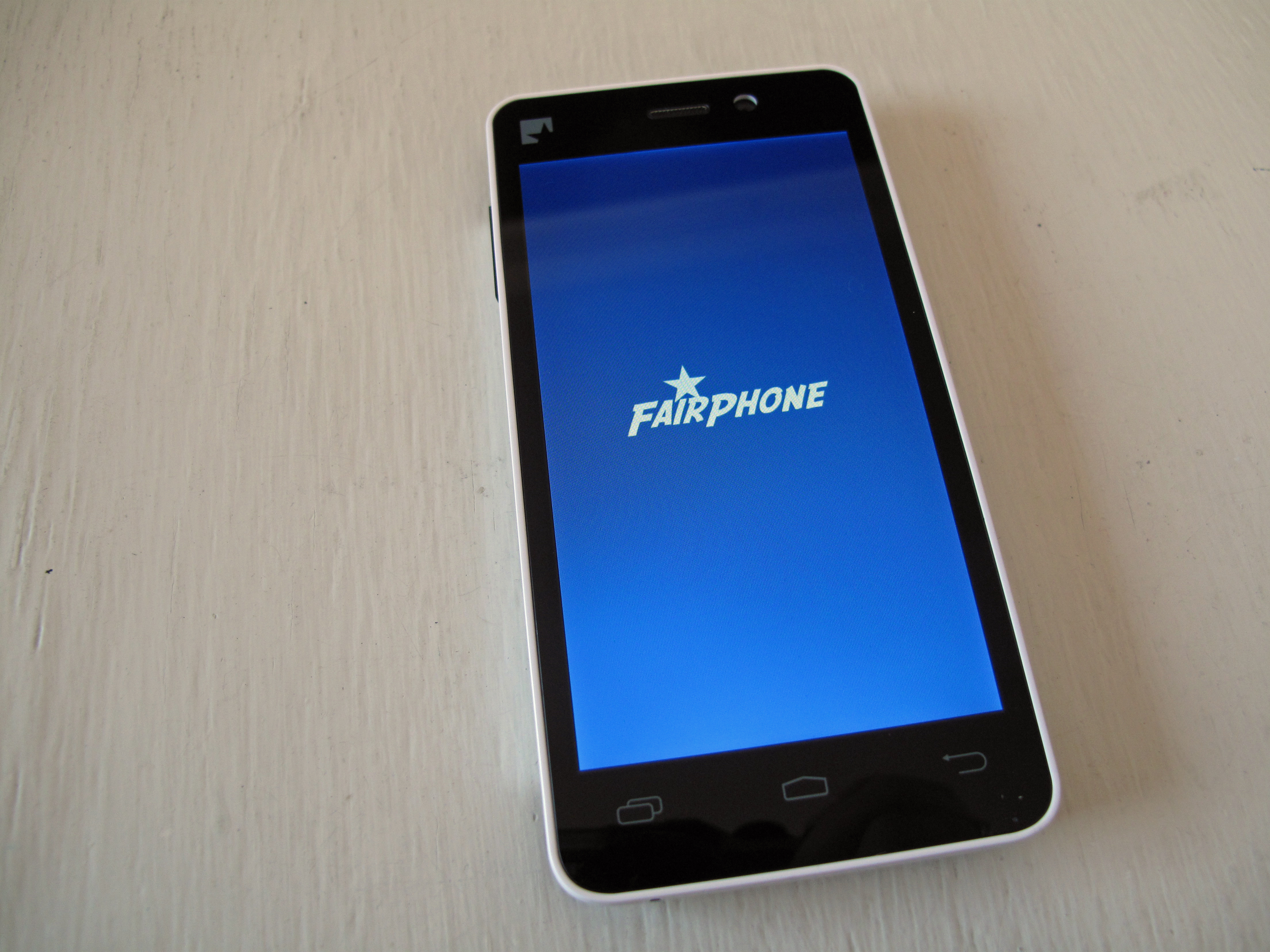
- Type: Smartphone
- First released: December 2013; 12 years ago
- Units shipped: 60,000
- Successor: Fairphone 2
- Compatible networks: GSM 850 900 1800 1900; WCDMA 900 2100
- Form factor: slate
- Dimensions: 126.0 mm (4.96 in) H 63.5 mm (2.50 in) W 10 mm (0.39 in) D
- Weight: 170 g (6.0 oz)
- Operating system: Android 4.2.2 "Jelly Bean" with specific extensions (Fairphone OS)
- CPU: MediaTek MT 6589 (quad-core) 1.2 GHz
- Memory: 1 GB
- Storage: 16 GB
- Removable storage: microSD up to 64 GB
- Battery: 2000 mAh
- Rear camera: 8 MP AF (stabilization + image sensor)
- Front camera: 1.3 MP
- Display: 4.3 in (110 mm) diagonal IPS LCD 960×540 px qHD 256 ppi supporting 16M colours
- External display: Dragontrail glass
- SAR: 0.318 W/kg
- Website: www.fairphone.com
- References: Specification of FP1

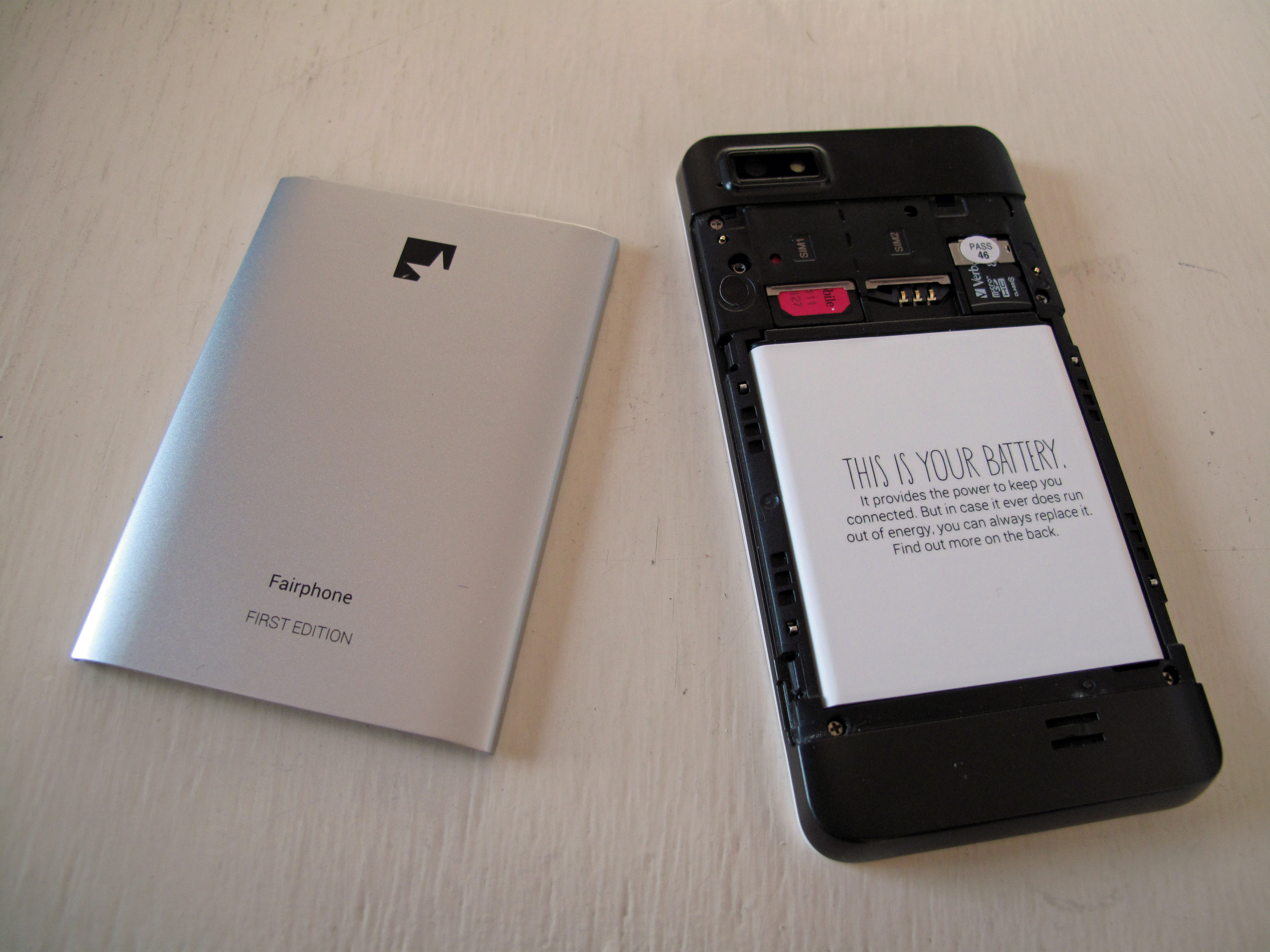
Fairphone 1, with the back lid removed. Removable battery, dual SIM slots and one SDHC card slot are visible.

The Fairphone 1 is a touchscreen-based, slate-sized smartphone designed and manufactured by Fairphone. It was released running Android 4.2.2 "Jelly Bean", with the Fairphone OS skin. It was the first phone from the social enterprise Fairphone, announced on 14 May 2013 and shipped beginning in December 2013.

== Production batches ==
=== First batch ===
- The project raised money for the initial batch of phones through pre-orders at ohm2013 bas started with that, reaching the required 5,000 on 5 June 2013. It sold the entire initial production run of 25,000 handsets on 13 November 2013, nearly a month in advance of the revised mid-December release date.

=== Second batch ===
- A second production run of 35,000 phones was released for sale on 21 May 2014.
- 3D Hubs and Fairphone partnered in July 2014 to offer locally produced 3D printed cases.
- The last batch of devices of the second production run was sold in February 2015. No more Fairphone 1 were produced, with the company focusing on developing the phone's successor Fairphone 2.

== Software updates ==
In December 2014, Fairphone admitted that it had failed to convince chipset vendor MediaTek to open up the source code for first-generation Fairphones. In September 2015, Fairphone released an update indicating that they had indeed gained access to MediaTek's source code.

An update to Android 4.4 “KitKat” was announced for 2016 but was delayed because of major issues. In July 2017, Fairphone announced in an e-mail to their buyers that they were sorry not to be able to pursue the release of Android 4.4 “KitKat” for the Fairphone 1.

=== Alternative software ===
In November 2013, one of the developers of Replicant wrote a blog post in which they said that Replicant could work on the Fairphone and the bootloaders (that are not part of the operating system) may even be free software. The Fairphone team seemed "definitely interested" in helping get Replicant running on the device.

In August 2014, an unofficial build of CyanogenMod 11 (Android 4.4 “KitKat”) for the Fairphone 1 engineered by Christian Hoffmann was published at the XDA Developers Forum.
