= Dave Hakkens =

Dutch industrial designer (born 1988)

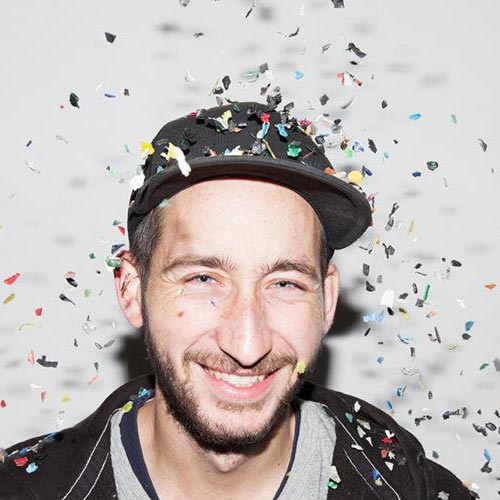
- Education: Design Academy Eindhoven
- Occupation: Industrial design
- Organization: Precious Plastic
- Known for: Phonebloks

YouTube information
- Channel: One Army
- Years active: 2006–present
- Subscribers: 363 thousand
- Views: 52.5 million
- Last updated: 2 September 2024
- Website: www.onearmy.earth

Dave Hakkens (born 1988) is a Dutch industrial designer. He gained fame with his two graduation projects: Phonebloks, a concept for modular telephones, and Precious Plastic, a movement to develop and promote machines and organizations for plastic recycling. Hakkens is seen by many as an example of a new generation of designers who have set themselves the goal of improving society by sharing knowledge.

== Education ==
In 2009, Hakkens graduated from Sint Lucas Academy in Boxtel, after which he graduated cum laude from Design Academy Eindhoven in 2013.

== Innovations ==
Hakkens gained fame with his two graduation projects: Phonebloks, a concept for modular telephones, and Precious Plastic, a movement to develop and promote machines and organizations for plastic recycling.

He also created "The Dust Ball", which is a honeycombed spherical cleaning robot for public spaces. John Pavlus of FastCompany called it "a cute, clutter-eating robot that looks like a futuristic vacuum crossed with a Tribble," and said Hakkens's best idea was to make the outer shell strong and flexible enough that you can push or kick it out of the way.

The Toilet 2.0 is a lighter and stronger toilet made of Corian, with water jets using grey water. Charlie Sorrel of Wired called the Toilet 2.0 concept a modern take on the old-fashioned WC, and said it collects waste water from the bath and sink and stores it to use for flushing.

== Videos ==
Hakkens is also known for making videos. Ruben Baart of nextnature.net said Hakkens spends his time building open-source recycling machinery, making videos and creating his own community to give people around the world the knowledge to locally start recycling plastic. Rachel Stevens of Impactboom said Hakkens loves to build machinery and inspirational videos, and to "push the world in a better direction."

== Reception ==
Hakkens is seen by many as an example of a new generation of designers who have set themselves the goal of improving society by sharing knowledge.

Claire Cottrell of The Atlantic wrote that Hakkens wanted to address the fact that 90 percent of the pens used get thrown away. In response, he made pens of candy that aren't sticky and won't melt in one's hands, filled with edible ink. Yuka Yoneda of Inhabit.com said Hakkens realized that people in the creative field, including himself, might be susceptible to pen-chewing behavior, so he created an edible pen that wouldn't be taboo to eat.

Ana Lisa of Inhabit.com said Hakkens created a series of colorful recycled composite "Rubble Floor" bricks by crushing and mixing materials from an old building, taking inspiration from Italian-style terrazzo floors made from waste produced in the marble mines. She also said the Netherlands is the perfect place to harvest wind power due to its flat landscape and strong breezes, and to take advantage of this resource, as a student at the Dutch Design Academy of Eindhoven, Hakkens created Wind Oil – a machine that extracts healthy oil from seeds and nuts by pressing them using a windmill.

Rodrigo Caula of DesignBoom wrote that Hakkens made a series of ceramic jugs by shrinking porcelain. He made a master mold with several textures and materials. With 14% kiln shrinkage, each form becomes a template for making smaller and smaller jugs. The starting 5 liter mold is made into 10 gradually smaller jugs, down to 10 milliliters. Caroline Williamson of design-milk described the process as making a mold from the original jug, filling it with porcelain, and baking so it shrank 14%. Molds were progressively made, baked, and shrunk. With each step, the jug slowly lost detail.

== Vegan lifestyle ==
Hakken and his organization support vegan lifestyles by hiring vegan chefs and providing vegan food at the workspace in Eindhoven. Taahirah Martin of Design Indaba wrote that an operator of a vegan food truck collaborated with Hakkens to create a conference table made out of recycled plastic.

== Awards and honors ==
- Eindhoven 2011: Nomination Brains Award for Hidden Hooks
- Beijing 2012: Franz Award for 'Shrinking Jugs'
- Eindhoven 2013: Melkweg Award
- Eindhoven 2013: Social Design Talent Award
- Eindhoven 2013: Keep an Eye Grant
- London 2014: Nomination Design of the Year 2014
- 2016 ECO Coin Award
