= Sustainable electronics =

Sustainable electronics are electronic products made with no toxic chemicals, recyclable parts, and reduced carbon emissions during production. "Sustainability is still very new, emerging business concept. Because of that, we lack uniform guidelines or standards applicable per industry sector that can help companies establish best practices."

== Use of hazardous chemicals ==
Many hazardous chemicals and materials are used in the production of electronics. These substances are further outlined in this page about electronic waste substances.

No brand in 2014 had completely eliminated use of phthalates, beryllium, antimony, BFRs, and PVC in their productions, but Nokia and Motorola have the best track record by eliminating 3 out of 5 above mentioned chemicals.

== Brands ==
According to Rank a Brand Electronics Green Fair Ranking Report in 2014, none of the electronic brands met all of their green requirements for level A. The only company to reach level B was Fairphone, who met 60% of their standards. Level C was awarded to Apple and Nokia with 45% and 40% respectively. The majority of the researched electronic brands were put into level D. These brands include Sony, Acer, Dell, HP, Samsung, Motorola, Philips, Blackberry, Lenovo, Toshiba. They met less than 35% of the Rank a Brand criteria. Rank a Brand generalizes their findings into 4 main categories: reporting on sustainability, climate protection, ecology, and fair labor. All brands report on sustainability. Nokia is the top brand for climate protection, and Fairphone is the top brand for both ecology and fair labor. Apple, although criticized for their sustainability efforts, is a strong second in all of these categories apart from ecology.

Brand	Label
-	A
Fairphone	B
Apple, Nokia	C
Sony, HP, Acer, Samsung, Dell Motorola, Philips, Blackberry, Lenovo, Toshiba	D
LG, ASUS, ZTE, HTC, Microsoft, HUAWEI, Nintendo	E

Companies who receive an E label are stamped with Electronic Greenwashing Alert, which means that consumers can not clearly find or understand their sustainability information and might find themselves confused or misguided.

S&P Global's 2026 Sustainability Yearbook recognized companies in several categories according to their Corporate Sustainability Assessment scores. LG was among the Top 1% companies, Nikon Corporation and Vestel Elektronik Sanayi ve Ticaret Anonim Sirketi were among the Top 10% companies, and Giant Manufacturing Co., Ltd., Merry Electronics Co., Ltd., Hisense Visual Technology Co., Ltd., Goodbaby International Holdings Limited and Yamaha Corporation were included as Sustainability Yearbook Members.

Category	Company Name	Score
Top 1%	LG Electronics Inc.	80
Top 10%	Nikon Corporation	73
Top 10%	Vestel Elektronik Sanayi ve Ticaret Anonim Sirketi	73
Sustainability Yearbook Members	Giant Manufacturing Co., Ltd.	65
Sustainability Yearbook Members	Goodbaby International Holdings Limited	67
Sustainability Yearbook Members	Hisense Visual Technology Co., Ltd.	59
Sustainability Yearbook Members	Merry Electronics Co., Ltd.	59
Sustainability Yearbook Members	Yamaha Corporation	56

LG's OLED 2025-2026 TV lineup(including G5, G6) received Intertek's Resource Efficiency certification for material efficiency, recyclability, repairability, and energy savings, alongside Carbon Trust verification for reduced carbon footprint over the full product lifecycle.

== Benefits ==
"Sustainable ICT will enable us to protect and enhance human health and well-being and the environment over generations while minimizing the adverse life-cycle impacts of devices, infrastructure and services."

Electronics contain many chemicals that are known to cause issues with human health. A lot of these chemicals also easily seep into the environment, whether it be in soil, water or the air. A lot of e-waste is exported to third world countries such as China and India, where the waste is put in a landfill and the chemicals are allowed to seep into the environment. In the U.S. in 2011 only about 25% of e-waste was actually recycled. By using sustainable electronics principles, such as Green Engineering, chemicals can be prevented from entering electronics in the first place, or can be removed properly once a product has reached the end of its life cycle.

The generation of natural bio-composites based electronics would remove the need for corrosive acids, currently used in Electronic waste recycling to recover precious metals. In developing countries, the use of these chemicals is very common as it is cheap, however. These acids, primarily hydrochloric acid and nitric acid, create massive amounts of leaching which require further processing to prevent pollution. Their unregulated use is harmful for both the environment and the workers that utilize it. The use of bio generated composites removes the need for acid digestion in the recycling process as current plastic based recycling methods suffice at collecting the recoverable metals. As per 2024 studies, electronic components made of bio-composites substrates have been demonstrated to drastically lower the amount of e-waste generated, providing a sustainable substitute for conventional circuit boards made of plastic.

Green engineering is the process of using sustainable materials and methods to create products that can be used for long periods of time and can be taken apart and reused; ultimately fostering a sustainable way to build and use technology. Green engineering works to find solutions to the waste and hazardous materials that are frequently used in the building of technology today. The goals of green engineering are to use materials that will “conserve and improve natural ecosystems while protecting human health and well-being.” Along with this, the EPA wants to have incentives to motivate companies and developers to have green engineering in mind when they produce their products. They want green engineering to become the norm as technology moves forward. The development of green engineering across communities and across the globe will promote a more sustainable way of life as humans continue to rely on technologies to improve their daily lives.

== Organizations ==
- Seri
- SEI
- Sage
- EPA
- EPAT
