= List of Formula SAE winners =

This is the list of the Formula SAE winners by Formula:

== United States ==
=== Formula SAE ===
- 1981 (United States) Stevens Institute of Technology
- 1982 (United States) University of Texas at Austin
- 1983 (United States) University of Texas at Arlington
- 1984 (United States) University of Houston
- 1985 (United States) University of Texas at Arlington
- 1986 (United States) University of Texas at Arlington
- 1987 (United States) University of Maryland - College Park
- 1988 (United States) Cornell University
- 1989 (United States) University of Texas at Arlington / Virginia Polytechnic Institute and State University Methanol
- 1990 (United States) University of Texas at Arlington
- 1991 (United States) Virginia Polytechnic Institute and State University
- 1992 (United States) Cornell University
- 1993 (United States) Cornell University
- 1994 (United States) University of Michigan at Ann Arbor
- 1995 (United States) University of Texas at Arlington
- 1996 (United States) University of Texas at Arlington
- 1997 (United States) Cornell University
- 1998 (United States) Cornell University
- 1999 (United States) University of Akron
- 2000 (United States) Texas A&M University
- 2001 (United States) Cornell University
- 2002 (United States) Cornell University
- 2003 (Australia) University of Wollongong
- 2004 (United States) Cornell University
- 2005 (United States) Cornell University
- 2006 (Australia) RMIT University
- 2007 (United States) University of Wisconsin–Madison
- 2008 University of Western Australia
- 2009 (Austria) Graz University of Technology
- 2010 (United States) / (Germany) Global Formula Racing
- 2011 (United States) / (Germany) Global Formula Racing
- 2012 (United States) / (Germany) Global Formula Racing
- 2013 (Germany) University of Stuttgart
- 2014 (United States) / (Germany) Global Formula Racing
- 2015 (United States) / (Germany) Global Formula Racing
- 2016 (Germany) University of Stuttgart
- 2017 (Germany) University of Stuttgart
- 2018 (Germany) University of Stuttgart
- 2019 (Germany) University of Stuttgart
- 2021 (United States) University of Michigan at Ann Arbor
- 2022 (United States) University of Illinois Urbana-Champaign Combustion / (Canada) Polytechnique Montreal Electric
- 2023 (United States) University of Illinois Urbana-Champaign Combustion / (Canada) École de technologie supérieure Electric
- 2024 (United States) Ohio State University Combustion / (United States) Rochester Institute of Technology Electric
- 2025 (Spain) Universidad Politecnica de Valencia Combustion / (United States) / (Germany) Global Formula Racing Electric
- 2026 (Spain) Universidad Politecnica de Valencia Combustion / (United States) / (Germany) Global Formula Racing Electric

=== Formula SAE Lincoln ===
Year	Date	Ed.	Place	Winner	
2005		1st		(United States) Texas A&M University	
2007		2nd		(United States) Texas A&M University	
2008		3rd		(United States) University of Maryland	
2009		4th		(United States) Rochester Institute of Technology	
2010		5th		(United States) Rochester Institute of Technology	
2011		6th		(Canada) École de technologie supérieure	
2012		7th		(United States) University of Kansas	
				Combustion	Electric
2013		8th		(United States) University of Washington	(Brazil) Universidade Estadual de Campinas
2014		9th		(United States) University of Kansas	(Brazil) Universidade Estadual de Campinas
2015		10th		(United States) San Jose State University	(United States) University of Pennsylvania
2016		11th		(United States) Auburn University	(Czech Republic) Czech Technical University
2017		12th		(United States) Texas A&M University	(United States) University of Pennsylvania
2018		13th		(United States) Texas A&M University	(United States) Carnegie Mellon University
2019		14th		(Canada) Polytechnique Montréal	(Canada) McGill University

== Italy ==
=== Formula SAE Italy ===
Year	Date	Edition	Venue	Formula SAE Italy	Formula Electric Italy	Formula Driverless
2005		1st		(Austria) Graz University of Technology	-	-
2006		2nd		(Austria) FH Joanneum	-	-
2007		3rd		(Germany) University of Stuttgart	-	-
2008		4th		(Germany) University of Stuttgart	-	-
2009		5th		(Germany) University of Stuttgart	-	-
2010		6th		(United States) / (Germany) Global Formula Racing	-	-
2011		7th		(Germany) University of Stuttgart	-	-
2012		8th		(Germany) West Saxon University of Applied Sciences of Zwickau	(Germany) University of Stuttgart	-
2013		9th		(Germany) University of Stuttgart	(Germany) University of Stuttgart	-
2014		10th		(Austria) Graz University of Technology	(Estonia) Tallinn University of Technology	-
2015		11th		(Austria) FH Joanneum	(Germany) West Saxon University of Applied Sciences of Zwickau	-
2016		12th		(Germany) Coburg University of Applied Sciences	(Germany) TU Dresden	-
2017	19-23 july	13th	Autodromo Riccardo Paletti	(Poland) Wrocław University of Science and Technology	(Germany) DHBW Stuttgart	-
2018	11-15 july	14th	Autodromo Riccardo Paletti	(Austria) Graz University of Technology	(Estonia) Tallinn University of Technology	(Switzerland) ETH Zurich
2019	24-28 july	15th	Autodromo Riccardo Paletti	(Italy) Politecnico di Milano	(Italy) Politecnico di Torino	(Italy) Sapienza University of Rome

== Japan ==
=== Formula SAE Japan ===
Year	Date	Ed.	Place	Winner		
2003	9/10~12	1st	Fuji Speed Way	(Japan) Sophia University		
2004	8/30~9/2	2nd	Twin Ring MOTEGI	(United States) University of Texas at Arlington		
2005	9/6~9	3rd	Fuji Speed Way	(Japan) Kanazawa University		
2006	9/13~16	4th	Ogasayama Sports Park ECOPA	(Japan) Sophia University		
2007	9/12~15	5th	Ogasayama Sports Park ECOPA	(Japan) Sophia University		
2008	9/10~13	6th	Ogasayama Sports Park ECOPA	(Japan) Sophia University		
2009	9/9~12	7th	Ogasayama Sports Park ECOPA	(Japan) The University of Tokyo		
2010	9/7~11	8th	Ogasayama Sports Park ECOPA	(Japan) Osaka University		
2011	9/5~9	9th	Ogasayama Sports Park ECOPA	(Japan) Sophia University		
				Overall	Combustion	Electric
2012	9/3~7	10th	Ogasayama Sports Park ECOPA	(Japan) Kyoto Institute of Technology	(Japan) Kyoto Institute of Technology	(Japan) Daido University
2013	9/3~7	11th	Ogasayama Sports Park ECOPA	(Japan) Kyoto University	(Japan) Kyoto University	(Japan) Shizuoka Institute of Science and Technology
2014	9/2~6	12th	Ogasayama Sports Park ECOPA	(Japan) Nagoya University	(Japan) Nagoya University	(Japan) National Institute Technology, Ichinoseki College/Iwate University/Iwate Prefectural University joint team
2015	9/1~5	13th	Ogasayama Sports Park ECOPA	(Austria) Graz University of Technology	(Austria) Graz University of Technology	(Japan) Nagoya University
2016	9/6~10	14th	Ogasayama Sports Park ECOPA	(Japan) Kyoto Institute of Technology	(Japan) Kyoto Institute of Technology	(Japan) National Institute Technology, Ichinoseki College/Iwate University/Iwate Prefectural University joint team
2017	9/5~9	15th	Ogasayama Sports Park ECOPA	(Japan) Kyoto Institute of Technology	(Japan) Kyoto Institute of Technology	(Japan) Nagoya University
2018	9/4~8	16th	Ogasayama Sports Park ECOPA	(Japan) Osaka University	(Japan) Osaka University	(Japan) Nagoya University
2019	8/27~31	17th	Ogasayama Sports Park ECOPA	(Japan) Nagoya Institute of Technology	(Japan) Nagoya Institute of Technology	(Japan) Nagoya University
2020	Cancelled	18th				
2021	9/7~11	19th	(only Static Events)	(Japan) Kobe University	(Japan) Kobe University	(Japan) Nagoya University
2022	9/3~7	20th	Ogasayama Sports Park ECOPA	(Japan) Kyoto Institute of Technology	(Japan) Kyoto Institute of Technology	(Japan) Shizuoka Institute of Science and Technology

== Canada ==
=== Formula North ===
Year	Date	Ed.	Place	Winner	
2015		1st		(Canada) École de technologie supérieure	
2016		2nd		(United States) Missouri S&T	
				Combustion	Electric
2017		3rd		(United States) University of Michigan	(United States) University of Pennsylvania
2018		4th		(Canada) École de technologie supérieure	(United States) Carnegie Mellon
2019		5th		(Canada) École de technologie supérieure	(United States) Carnegie Mellon

== Austria ==
=== Formula Student Austria ===
Year	Ed.	Winner	
2010	1st	(United States) (Germany) Global Formula Racing	
2011	2nd	(United States) (Germany) Global Formula Racing	
2012	3rd	(United States) (Germany) Global Formula Racing	
2013	4th	(Switzerland) ETH Zurich	
		Combustion	Electric
2014	5th	(United States) (Germany) Global Formula Racing	(Switzerland) ETH Zurich
2015	6th	(United States) (Germany) Global Formula Racing	(Switzerland) ETH Zurich
2016	7th	(Germany) University of Stuttgart	(Switzerland) ETH Zurich
2017	8th	(Germany) University of Stuttgart	(Switzerland) ETH Zurich
2018	9th	(Austria) Graz University of Technology	(Germany) Hamburg University of Technology
2019	10th	(Austria) Fachhochschule Joanneum Graz	(Germany) Technical University of Munich
2020	not held		
2021	11th	(Germany) Hochschule Esslingen	(Germany) RWTH Aachen University
2022	12th	[[University of Stuttgart| (Germany) ]] University of Stuttgart	(Germany) University of Stuttgart
2023	13th	(Czech Republic) Czech Technical University in Prague	(Germany) Westsächsische Hochschule Zwickau
2024	14th	(Italy) Uni MoRE	(Estonia) Tallinn TU UAS

== Czech ==
=== Formula Student Czech ===
Year	Date	Ed.	Place	Winner		
				Combustion	Electric	
2013		1st		(Germany) High-Octane Motorsports	(Germany) TUfast e-Technlogy	
2014		2nd		(Austria) TU Graz Racing Team	(Greece) UoP Racing	
2015		3rd		(Germany) HAWKS Racing	(Germany) Elefant Racing	
2016		4th		(United Kingdom) Team Bath Racing	(Spain) ETSEIB Motorsport	
2017		5th		(Czech Republic) TU Brno Racing	(Germany) Running Snail Racing Team	
2018		6th		(Czech Republic) TU Brno Racing	(Czech Republic) eForce FEE Prague Formula	
				Combustion	Electric	Driverless
2019		7th		(Czech Republic) CTU CarTech Prague	(Germany) WHZ Racing Team	(Estonia) FS Team Tallinn Driverless
2021		8th		(Czech Republic) CTU CarTech Prague	(Greece) Prom Racing NTUA FSAE Team	(Germany) KA-RaceIng e.V. Driverless
2022		9th		(Germany) FaSTDa Racing - Combustion		(Estonia) FS Team Tallinn Driverless
2023		10th		(Poland) PRz Racing Team	(Germany) WHZ Racing Team	(Germany) Fast Forest
2024		11th		(Poland) Cerber Motorsport	(Austria) Joanneum Racing Graz	(Czech Republic) eForce Prague Formula
2025		12th		(Turkey) YTU Racing	(Austria) Joanneum Racing Graz	(Norway) Revolve NTNU

== Croatia ==
=== Formula Student Alpe Adria ===
Year	Date	Ed.	Place	Winner	
2017	22.-23.09	1st	Rijeka	(Croatia) Riteh Racing Team	
2019	29.-31.08	2nd	Rijeka	(Slovenia) Superior Engineering	
				Combustion	Electric
2020		3rd	Novi Marof	Cancelled due to COVID-19 Pandemic	
2021	26.-29.08	4th	Novi Marof	(Germany) UPBracing Team	(Germany) Greenteam Uni Stuttgart
2022	23.-28.08	5th	Novi Marof	(Germany) Rennstall Esslingen	(Austria) Joanneum Racing Graz
2023	21.-26.08	6th	Mičevec	(Germany) Rennteam Uni Stuttgart	(Germany) Rennstall Esslingen
2024	20.-25.08	7th	Mičevec	(Italy) MoRe Modena Racing Hybrid	(Austria) TUG Racing
2025	12.-17.08	8th	Mičevec	(Greece) Aristotle Racing Team	(Austria) TUG Racing
2026	18.-23.08	9th	Mičevec	(Italy) RaceUP Hybrid Padova	(Austria) TUG Racing

=== Virtual Formula Student Alpe Adria ===
Year	Date	Ed.	Place	Winner
2024		1st	Mičevec	(Hungary) BME Motorsport
2024		2nd	Mičevec	(Poland) PolSL Racing
2025		3rd	Mičevec	(Poland) PGRacing

== Germany ==
=== Formula Student Germany ===
Year	Electric	Combustion	Driverless
2006	(Austria) TU Graz		—
2007	(Germany) University of Stuttgart		—
2008	(Netherlands) TU Delft		—
2009	(Germany) University of Stuttgart		—
2010	(Germany) University of Stuttgart	(Netherlands) TU Delft	—
2011	(Netherlands) TU Delft	(United States) (Germany) Global Formula Racing (c)	—
2012	(Netherlands) TU Delft	(Germany) University of Stuttgart	—
2013	(Netherlands) TU Delft	(United States) (Germany) Global Formula Racing (c)	—
2014	(Switzerland) ETH Zurich	(United States) (Germany) Global Formula Racing (c)	—
2015	(Netherlands) TU Delft	(United States) (Germany) Global Formula Racing (c)	—
2016	(Germany) Karlsruhe Institute of Technology	(Germany) Technical University of Munich	—
2017	(Germany) University of Stuttgart	(Germany) UAS Esslingen	(Switzerland) ETH Zurich
2018	(Switzerland) ETH Zurich	(Germany) University of Stuttgart	(Switzerland) ETH Zurich
2019	(Germany) Technical University of Munich	(Germany) UAS Esslingen	(Switzerland) ETH Zurich
2020	Cancelled due to COVID-19 Pandemic		
2021	(Germany) University of Stuttgart	(Germany) UAS Esslingen	(Germany) Karlsruhe Institute of Technology
2022	(Germany) University of Stuttgart	(Germany) Karlsruhe UAS	(Germany) Augsburg UAS
2023	(Germany) RWTH Aachen University	(Germany) Karlsruhe UAS	(Sweden) Chalmers UT
2024	(Switzerland) ETH Zurich	—	(Switzerland) ETH Zurich
2025	(Switzerland) ETH Zurich	—	(Sweden) Chalmers UT

== Others ==
Year	Formula Student Spain	Formula Student Hungary (Formula Student East)	(Brazil) Formula SAE Brasil	(Australia) Formula SAE Australasia	(United States) Formula SAE Virginia	
2026			(Brazil) University of São Paulo - EESC-USP, São Carlos (c) (Brazil) Centro Universitario da FEI (e)			
2025			(Brazil) University of São Paulo - EESC-USP, São Carlos (c) (Brazil) Centro Universitario da FEI (e)			
2024		Electric: (Switzerland) ETH Zurich Driverless: (Switzerland) ETH Zurich	(Brazil) Federal Center for Technological Education of Minas Gerais (c) (Brazil) Faculdade de Engenharia de Sorocaba (e)			
2023			(Brazil) Federal Center for Technological Education of Minas Gerais (c) (Brazil) Faculdade de Engenharia de Sorocaba (e)			
2022			(Brazil) Federal Center for Technological Education of Minas Gerais (c) (Brazil) Centro Universitário da FEI (e)	The University of Auckland (e) The University of Waikato (c)		
2021	Electric: UAS Sankt Augustin (BRS Motorsport)		(Brazil) Federal Center for Technological Education of Minas Gerais (c) (Brazil) University of São Paulo - EESC-USP, Tupã (e)[Online/Virtual Event due to COVID-19]			
2020			[Event was not held due to COVID-19]			
2019			(Brazil) Universidade Estadual de Campinas (c) (Brazil) Universidade Estadual de Campinas (e)			
2018	Combustion: (Germany) University of Stuttgart Electric: (Germany) University of Stuttgart		(Brazil) Federal Center for Technological Education of Minas Gerais (c) (Brazil) Universidade Estadual de Campinas (e)			
2017	Combustion: (Austria) TU Graz Electric: (Switzerland) ETH Zurich	(Germany) University of Stuttgart	(Brazil) Faculdade de Engenharia de Sorocaba (c) (Brazil) Universidade Estadual de Campinas (e)	(Australia) Monash University (c) (e)	(event not held)	
2016	Combustion: (Germany) University of Stuttgart Electric: (Netherlands) Delft University of Technology		(Brazil) University of São Paulo - EESC-USP, São Carlos (c) (Brazil) Universidade Estadual de Campinas (e)	(Australia) University of Wollongong	(event not held)	
2015	(Switzerland) ETH Zurich	(Germany) University of Stuttgart (c) (Switzerland) ETH Zurich (e)	(Brazil) University of São Paulo - EESC-USP, São Carlos (c) (Brazil) Centro Universitário da FEI (e)	(Australia) Monash University	(event not held)	
2014		(United States) (Germany) Global Formula Racing (c) (Switzerland) ETH Zurich (e)	(Italy) University of Bologna (c) (Brazil) Universidade Estadual de Campinas (e)	(Australia) Monash University	(event not held)	
2013		(Germany) Esslingen University of Applied Sciences (c) (Germany) Munich University of Applied Science (e)	(Brazil) Centro Universitario da FEI (c) (Brazil) Universidade Estadual de Campinas (e)	(Australia) Monash University	(event not held)	
2012	Hybrid: (United States) Brigham Young University (Canada) Université de Sherbrooke (tie) Electric: (United States) University of Kansas	(Germany) Esslingen University of Applied Sciences (c) (Switzerland) ETH Zurich (e)	(Brazil) Centro Universitário da FEI (c) (Brazil) Universidade Estadual de Campinas (e)	(Australia) Monash University	(event not held)	
2011	(United States) Texas A&M University	(Germany) DHBW Stuttgart (c) (Switzerland) ETH Zurich (e)	(Brazil) Centro Universitário da FEI	(Australia) Monash University	(United States) Missouri S&T	
2010	(Italy) Politecnico Di Torino	(Germany) University of Hannover	(Brazil) Centro Universitário da FEI	(Australia) Monash University	(United States) University of Wisconsin	
2009	(United States) Texas A&M University		(Brazil) Centro Universitário da FEI	(Australia) Monash University		
2008			(Japan) Sophia University	(Brazil) Centro Universitário da FEI		(Germany) University of Stuttgart
2007			(Brazil) Faculdade de Engenharia de Sorocaba	University of Western Australia		
2006			(Brazil) Centro Universitário da FEI	University of Western Australia		
2005			(Brazil) University of São Paulo - São Carlos	(Australia) RMIT University		
2004			(Brazil) University of São Paulo - São Carlos	(Australia) University of Wollongong		
2003				(United States) Georgia Tech		
2002						(Australia) University of Wollongong
2001						(United States) Rochester Institute of Technology
2000						(Australia) University of New South Wales
1999						
1998
1997
1996
1995
1994
1993
1992
1991
1990
1989
1988
1987
1986
1985
1984
1983
1982
1981

(c) - combustion

(e) - electric

(h) - hybrid

== Notes ==
From 2006 to 2011 Formula SAE West was held at Auto Club Speedway in Fontana, CA.
