= Design/Build/Fly =

Radio-controlled aircraft competition

Design/Build/Fly, or DBF, is a radio-controlled aircraft competition sponsored by the American Institute of Aeronautics and Astronautics (AIAA), Cessna Aircraft Company, and Raytheon Missile Systems. The competition is intended to challenge the AIAA student branches of each university to design, build, and fly a remote-controlled airplane that can complete specific ground and flight missions. Additionally, the teams are required to submit a comprehensive design report detailing the most important aspects of their designs.

Competition rules vary annually, switching between humanitarian and military themes. Rules typically release in late September, with the final fly-off in April. A mathematical formula outlined in the rules calculates each entry's score, which lately combines design report and performance scores from fly-off missions.

== Results ==
Year	Location	1st place	2nd place	3rd place	4th place	5th place
1997	Ragged Island, MD	University of Illinois, Urbana-Champaign	Virginia Tech	Texas A&M University	Utah State University	West Virginia University
1998	Wichita, KS	University of Southern California ("Pepe")	Texas A&M University	Syracuse University	University of Texas, Austin	Utah State University [Paper Score]
1999	Pax River, MD	Utah State University	Oklahoma State University	University of Southern California ("H2OT Shark")	Georgia Institute of Technology	Texas A&M University
2000	Wichita, KS	Utah State University ("Wing and a Prayer")	Oklahoma State University 1	University of Illinois, Urbana-Champaign	Georgia Institute of Technology	Oklahoma State University 2
2001	Pax River, MD	Oklahoma State University (Orange)	California Polytechnic State University	Oklahoma State University (Black)	University of California, San Diego	Utah State University
2002	Wichita, KS	University of California, San Diego	University of Southern California ("SCrewball")	West Virginia University	University of Illinois, Urbana-Champaign	Universita degli Studi di Roma La Sapienza
2003	Ridgely Airpark, MD	San Diego State University	California Polytechnic State University	Universita degli Studi di Roma La Sapienza	University of Southern California ("SCyRaider")	Oklahoma State University (Black)
2004	Wichita, KS	Oklahoma State University (Black)	Oklahoma State University (Orange)	University of Southern California ("SCquirt")	University of Illinois, Urbana-Champaign	California Polytechnic State University
2005	Pax River, MD	Oklahoma State University (Black)	Oklahoma State University (Orange)	Washington State University	Virginia Tech	University of California, San Diego
2006	Wichita, KS	Oklahoma State University (Black)	Oklahoma State University (Orange)	California Polytechnic State University (24" Wood)	University of Southern California ("SCtingray")	Istanbul Technical University
2007	Tucson, AZ	Massachusetts Institute of Technology	Oklahoma State University (Orange)	Purdue University	Oklahoma State University (Black)	Wichita State University (Shockin' Surveyor)
2008	Wichita, KS	Oklahoma State University (Black)	University of Texas, Austin (The Hornworks)	Oklahoma State University (Orange)	University of Texas, Austin (Orange Bullet)	University of Colorado Boulder
2009	Tucson, AZ	Oklahoma State University (Black)	Oklahoma State University (Orange)	University of Southern California ("Turbo Encabulator")	Massachusetts Institute of Technology (Just Wing It)	University of California - Irvine (Zot Rocket)
2010	Wichita, KS	Oklahoma State University (Orange)	Oklahoma State University (Black)	Purdue University (B'Euler Up)	University of Texas, Austin (Bat Wing)	California Polytechnic State University (Swings Both Ways)
2011	Tucson, AZ	Georgia Institute of Technology (There Will Be Buzz)	University of Southern California ("The RFB")	Purdue University (The Golfstream)	Wichita State University (MiniWheat)	California Polytechnic State University (Balls Deep)
2012	Wichita, KS	San Jose State University (Team PhalanX)	University of California, Irvine (Angel of Attack)	University of Colorado Boulder (H2BuffalO)	Istanbul Technical University (ATA)	University of Oklahoma (Crimson Skies)
2013	Tucson, AZ	University of California, Irvine	San Diego State University	Rensselaer Polytechnic Institute	Massachusetts Institute of Technology	University of Colorado Boulder
2014	Wichita, KS	University of Southern California ("MiSChief")	University of California, Irvine	San Jose State University	University of Ljubljana, Slovenia	Massachusetts Institute of Technology
2015	Tucson, AZ	University of Ljubljana, Slovenia	University of California, Irvine	Georgia Institute of Technology	Tel Aviv University	University of Texas, Austin (The RebUTtal)
2016	Wichita, KS	San Jose State University	Georgia Institute of Technology	University of California, Irvine	Virginia Tech	University of Oklahoma
2017	Tucson, AZ	University of Southern California ("StarSCream")	Georgia Institute of Technology	University of Ljubljana, Slovenia	Massachusetts Institute of Technology	Oregon State University
2018	Wichita, KS	Clarkson University ("KnightHawk")	Virginia Tech ("Atlas")	Georgia Institute of Technology	University of Ljubljana, Slovenia	University of Texas, Austin
2019	Tucson, AZ	University of Ljubljana, Slovenia ("Pretty Boy")	Georgia Institute of Technology	FH Joanneum	University of Southern California ("ExSCalibur")	Veermata Jijabai Technological Institute ("Jatayu")
2020	Wichita, KS	University of Southern California ("SCkyfall")	Georgia Institute of Technology	University of Nevada, Las Vegas	Pennsylvania State University	The City College of New York
2021	Tucson, AZ	Dayananda Sagar College of Engineering	University of Central Florida	Embry-Riddle Aeronautical University, Daytona Beach ("STAT")	Ohio State University	Georgia Institute of Technology
2022	Wichita, KS	Georgia Institute of Technology	Embry-Riddle Aeronautical University, Daytona Beach ("MULLET")	FH Joanneum ("Hornet")	University of Southern California ("VaxSCinator" A.K.A "RadoviSCh")	Virginia Tech ("Blacksbird")
2023	Tucson, AZ	RWTH Aachen University	University of Ljubljana, Slovenia ("ATLAS")	Embry-Riddle Aeronautical University, Daytona Beach ("ROOSTER")	Virginia Tech ("SOB")	University of Washington Seattle ("Sailfin")
2024	Wichita, KS	Embry-Riddle Aeronautical University, Daytona Beach ("WRENCH")	Georgia Institute of Technology	University of Washington, Seattle ("Orca")	Virginia Tech ("THE")	FH Joanneum ("Bergfink")
2025	Tucson, AZ	FH Joanneum, Graz, Austria ("Seeschwalbe")	Royal Melbourne Institute of Technology, Melbourne, Australia	Santa Clara University, Santa Clara, Calif.	The University of Akron, Akron, Ohio	Rensselaer Polytechnic Institute, Troy, New York
2026	Wichita, KS	University of Ljubljana, Slovenia ("BRVINC")	University of Washington, Seattle ("Mako")	University of California, Los Angeles ("GOOSE")	University of Notre Dame ("Duck o' the Irish")	Rensselaer Polytechnic Institute, Troy, New York

1. The 2020 fly-off was cancelled due to the COVID-19 pandemic. Scores and rankings were solely based on the report scores.
2. The 2021 fly-off was cancelled due to the COVID-19 pandemic. Select teams were invited to submit a video presentation and demonstration of their aircraft.

== Design aspects ==
Students are required to keep up with changing technologies and mission requirements as the aerospace industry advances. Recent mission requirements have included increased focus on fuel efficiency, environmental sustainability, and electric propulsion. Additionally, the use of advanced materials and manufacturing techniques has become more prevalent in the competition, as students look for ways to optimize their aircraft performance while keeping costs down.

== List of top 5 finishes by university ==
Rank	University	Top 5	First place
1	Oklahoma State University	11	7
2	University of Southern California	13	4
3	Georgia Institute of Technology	12	2
4	University of Ljubljana	7	3
5	Utah State University	5	2
6	Virginia Tech	7	0
7	University of California, Irvine	5	1
8	California Polytechnic State University	6	0
9	Massachusetts Institute of Technology	5	1
10	Embry-Riddle Aeronautical University, Daytona Beach	4	1
11	FH Joanneum	4	1
12	University of Texas, Austin	5	0
13	University of Illinois, Urbana-Champaign	4	1
14	San Jose State University	3	2
15	University of California, San Diego	3	1
16	University of Washington, Seattle	3	0
17	Rensselaer Polytechnic Institute	3	0
18	Purdue University	3	0
19	Texas A&M University	3	0
20	University of Colorado Boulder	3	0
21	San Diego State University	2	1
22	Istanbul Technical University	2	0
23	Universita degli Studi di Roma La Sapienza	2	0
24	University of Oklahoma	2	0
25	West Virginia University	2	0
26	Wichita State University	2	0
27	Clarkson University	1	1
28	Dayananda Sagar College of Engineering	1	1
29	RWTH Aachen University	1	1
30	Syracuse University	1	0
31	Tel Aviv University	1	0
32	Veermata Jijabai Technological Institute	1	0
33	University of Nevada, Las Vegas	1	0
34	Pennsylvania State University	1	0
35	The City College of New York	1	0
36	University of Central Florida	1	0
37	Ohio State University	1	0
38	University of Notre Dame	1	0
39	The University of Akron	1	0
40	Santa Clara University	1	0
41	Royal Melbourne Institute of Technology	1	0
42	Oregon State University	1	0
