= H. C. Balakrishna =

Indian politician (born 1965)

H. C. Balakrishna (born 1965) is an Indian politician from Karnataka. He is a five time member of the Karnataka Legislative Assembly from Magadi Assembly constituency in Ramanagara district. He represents Indian National Congress and won the 2023 Karnataka Legislative Assembly election.

He was appointed chairman for Karnataka State Road Development Corporation on 26 January 2024.

== Early life and education ==
Balakrishna is from Magadi. His father H.G. Channappa is a farmer and a former three time MLA and also served as a minister. He did his schooling at Government Boys College and completed his MBBS in 1991 from Kempegowda Institute of Medical Sciences.

== Career ==
Balakrishna won from Magadi Assembly constituency representing Indian National Congress in the 2023 Karnataka Legislative Assembly election. He polled 94,650 votes and defeated his nearest rival, A. Manjunath of Janata Dal (Secular) by a margin of 11,839 votes. He was first elected as an MLA from Magadi seat in 1994 on Bharatiya Janata Party ticket. He lost the 1999 election to H. M. Revanna of Indian National Congress by a narrow margin of 5095 votes. Later, he won continuously for three terms winning in 2004, 2008 and 2013. In the 2004 Karnataka Legislative Assembly election, he polled 49,197 votes and defeated Revanna this time with a margin of 11,276 votes.

He became an MLA for third time, retaining the Magadi seat in the 2008 Karnataka Legislative Assembly election. He polled 75.991 votes and defeated P. Nagaraj of BJP by a huge margin of 24,919 votes. In the 2013 Karnataka Legislative Assembly election, he represented Janata Dal (Secular) and defeated the Indian National Congress candidate A. Manjunath by a margin of 14,359 votes. In 2018, contesting on Congress ticket, he lost to A. Manjunath of JD(S) by a huge margin of 51,425 votes. He regained the seat in the 2023 election defeating Manjunath.
