= Anup Revanna =

Indian film Actor (born 1994)

- Born: 8 February 1994 (age 32); Bangalore, Karnataka
- Education: Dayananda Sagar College of Engineering, Bangalore
- Occupation: actor
- Years active: 2015 - present
- Parent(s): H M Revanna; Vatsala Revanna

Anup Revanna is an Indian actor who works in Kannada cinema. The son of former Karnataka minister H M Revanna, Anup entered the film industry as an actor through the 2016 action film Lakshmana.

== Early life ==
Anup Revanna was born on 8 February 1994 in Bangalore as the son of Politician H M Revanna and Vatsala Revanna. He attended Dayananda Sagar College of Engineering, Bangalore.

== Career ==
Anup learned acting in Koothu-P-Pattarai. In 2016, Anup debuted as a lead actor in R. Chandru's action film Lakshmana. His second film was Na Panta Kano, directed by S. Narayan, and was released in 2017.

== Filmography ==
- All films are in Kannada, otherwise noted.

Year	Title	Role	Notes
2016	Lakshmana	Lakshmana	Nominated—SIIMA Award for Best Debutant - Male
2017	Naa Panta Kano	Arjun	
2023	Kabzaa	Fayaaz	
2024	Hide and Seek	TBA	
