= H. M. Revanna =

Indian politician

H M Revanna

Member of the Karnataka Legislative Council
- In office 1 July 2014 – 30 June 2020

Transport Minister of Karnataka
- In office 2 September 2017 – 15 May 2018

MLA
- In office 1999–2004
- Preceded by: H. C. Balakrishna
- Succeeded by: H. C. Balakrishna
- Constituency: Magadi

MLA
- In office 1989–1994
- Preceded by: H. G. Channappa
- Succeeded by: H. C. Balakrishna
- Constituency: Magadi

Personal details
- Party: Indian National Congress
- Children: Anup Revanna
- Occupation: Politician

H M Revanna is a politician from Karnataka state. He is a leader of Indian National Congress. He was an MLC in Karnataka legislative council from 2014 to 2020.

== Political career ==
He won twice as MLA from Magadi constituency in 1989 and 1999. On 2 September 2017 he was inducted into Siddaramaiah cabinet as Transport minister. In 2018 elections he contested from Channapatna and lost to former Chief minister H.D.Kumaraswamy.

== Personal ==
His son Anup Revanna is an actor in Kannada Cinema
