= Magadi Assembly constituency =

Legislative Assembly constituency in Karnataka, India

Coordinates: 12.96°N 77.23°E

Magadi
- Constituency No. 182 for the Karnataka Legislative Assembly

Constituency details
- Country: India
- Region: South India
- State: Karnataka
- District: Bengaluru south
- Lok Sabha constituency: Bangalore Rural
- Established: 1951
- Total electors: 233,433 (2023)
- Reservation: None

Member of Legislative Assembly
- 16th Karnataka Legislative Assembly
- Incumbent H. C. Balakrishna
- Party: Indian National Congress
- Elected year: 2023
- Preceded by: A. Manjunath

Magadi Assembly constituency is one of the 224 constituencies in the Karnataka Legislative Assembly of Karnataka, a southern state of India. It is also part of Bangalore Rural Lok Sabha constituency.

== Members of the Legislative Assembly ==
Election	Member	Party
1952	S. Sidappa	Indian National Congress
1957	B. Singri Gowda	Praja Socialist Party
1957 By-election (Note: Died in 1957)	T. D. Maranna	Indian National Congress
1962	C. R. Range Gowda	Praja Socialist Party
1967	C. R. Range Gowda	Praja Socialist Party
1972	H. G. Channappa	Independent politician
1978	Berraswamy Gowda	Janata Party
1983	H. G. Channappa	Indian National Congress
1985	H. G. Channappa	Janata Party
1989	H. M. Revanna	Indian National Congress
1994	H. C. Balakrishna	Bharatiya Janata Party
1999	H. M. Revanna	Indian National Congress
2004	H. C. Balakrishna	Janata Dal
2008	H. C. Balakrishna	Janata Dal
2013	H. C. Balakrishna	Janata Dal
2018	A. Manjunath	Janata Dal
2023	H. C. Balakrishna	Indian National Congress

== Election results ==
=== Assembly Election 2023 ===
2023 Karnataka Legislative Assembly election : Magadi
Party	Candidate	Votes	%	±%
INC	H. C. Balakrishna	94,650	46.74%	▲11.69
JD(S)	A. Manjunath	82,811	40.89%	▼20.63
BJP	Prasad Gawda. K. R	20,197	9.97%	▲7.70
NOTA	None of the above	604	0.30%	▼0.13
Margin of victory		11,839	5.85%	▼20.63
Turnout		202,733	86.85%	▲0.43
Total valid votes		202,508		
Registered electors		233,433		▲3.81
INC gain from JD(S)		Swing	▼14.78	

=== Assembly Election 2018 ===
2018 Karnataka Legislative Assembly election : Magadi
Party	Candidate	Votes	%	±%
JD(S)	A. Manjunath	119,492	61.52%	▲11.20
INC	H. C. Balakrishna	68,067	35.05%	▼5.61
BJP	M. C. Hanumantharaj	4,410	2.27%	▲1.19
NOTA	None of the above	839	0.43%	New
Margin of victory		51,425	26.48%	▲16.82
Turnout		194,331	86.42%	▲2.54
Total valid votes		194,218		
Registered electors		224,869		▲10.78
JD(S) hold		Swing	▲11.20	

=== Assembly Election 2013 ===
2013 Karnataka Legislative Assembly election : Magadi
Party	Candidate	Votes	%	±%
JD(S)	H. C. Balakrishna	74,821	50.32%	▼2.43
INC	A. Manjunath	60,462	40.66%	▲33.44
KJP	H. M. Kirshnamurthy	27,143	18.25%	New
BJP	C. K. Jagadish Prasad	1,604	1.08%	▼34.38
Bharatiya Dr. B.R.Ambedkar Janta Party	A. G. Krishnamurthy	1,228	0.83%	New
Independent	M. T. Ravikumar	1,069	0.72%	New
Margin of victory		14,359	9.66%	▼7.64
Turnout		170,277	83.88%	▲6.52
Total valid votes		148,705		
Registered electors		202,992		▲8.99
JD(S) hold		Swing	▼2.43	

=== Assembly Election 2008 ===
2008 Karnataka Legislative Assembly election : Magadi
Party	Candidate	Votes	%	±%
JD(S)	H. C. Balakrishna	75,991	52.75%	▲11.56
BJP	P. Nagaraju	51,072	35.46%	▲10.96
INC	Kalpana Shivanna	10,399	7.22%	▼24.53
SP	D. Shivakumar	1,628	1.13%	New
Independent	H. B. Shivalingaiah	1,126	0.78%	New
BSP	Jaffer Pasha	1,056	0.73%	New
Margin of victory		24,919	17.30%	▲7.86
Turnout		144,085	77.36%	▲8.17
Total valid votes		144,047		
Registered electors		186,252		▲7.47
JD(S) hold		Swing	▲11.56	

=== Assembly Election 2004 ===
2004 Karnataka Legislative Assembly election : Magadi
Party	Candidate	Votes	%	±%
JD(S)	H. C. Balakrishna	49,197	41.19%	▲33.79
INC	H. M. Revanna	37,921	31.75%	▼16.49
BJP	Pushpa. C	29,261	24.50%	▼19.09
Kannada Nadu Party	Parthasarthy. T. G	1,056	0.88%	New
Margin of victory		11,276	9.44%	▲4.78
Turnout		119,911	69.19%	▼3.54
Total valid votes		119,437		
Registered electors		173,298		▲12.57
JD(S) gain from INC		Swing	▼7.05	

=== Assembly Election 1999 ===
1999 Karnataka Legislative Assembly election : Magadi
Party	Candidate	Votes	%	±%
INC	H. M. Revanna	52,802	48.24%	▲8.13
BJP	H. C. Balakrishna S/o. H. G. Channappa	47,707	43.59%	▼10.42
JD(S)	H. R. Kemegowda S/o Late Ramegowda	8,094	7.40%	New
Margin of victory		5,095	4.66%	▼9.24
Turnout		111,965	72.73%	▼3.75
Total valid votes		109,446		
Rejected ballots		2,519	2.25%	▲1.12
Registered electors		153,945		▲10.82
INC gain from BJP		Swing	▼5.77	

=== Assembly Election 1994 ===
1994 Karnataka Legislative Assembly election : Magadi
Party	Candidate	Votes	%	±%
BJP	H. C. Balakrishna	56,735	54.01%	▲52.91
INC	H. M. Revanna	42,131	40.11%	▼12.55
JD	Revanna (V. G. Doddi)	3,347	3.19%	▼12.13
INC	Javarappa	1,917	1.82%	New
Margin of victory		14,604	13.90%	▼11.69
Turnout		106,249	76.48%	▲2.42
Total valid votes		105,044		
Rejected ballots		1,205	1.13%	▼3.13
Registered electors		138,919		▲11.09
BJP gain from INC		Swing	▲1.35	

=== Assembly Election 1989 ===
1989 Karnataka Legislative Assembly election : Magadi
Party	Candidate	Votes	%	±%
INC	H. M. Revanna	46,697	52.66%	▲9.52
JP	Berraswamy Gowda	24,001	27.07%	New
JD	H. G. Channappa	13,589	15.32%	New
Kranti Sabha	Mariyappa Gowada	1,663	1.88%	New
BJP	B. H. Maheshaiah	978	1.10%	New
Margin of victory		22,696	25.59%	▲14.14
Turnout		92,618	74.06%	▲2.35
Total valid votes		88,675		
Rejected ballots		3,943	4.26%	▲3.06
Registered electors		125,052		▲25.29
INC gain from JP		Swing	▼1.93	

=== Assembly Election 1985 ===
1985 Karnataka Legislative Assembly election : Magadi
Party	Candidate	Votes	%	±%
JP	H. G. Channappa	38,605	54.59%	▲9.49
INC	H. M. Revanna	30,507	43.14%	▼4.53
LKD	T. C. Nagaraju	1,357	1.92%	▼3.99
Margin of victory		8,098	11.45%	▲8.88
Turnout		71,574	71.71%	▲0.11
Total valid votes		70,718		
Rejected ballots		856	1.20%	▼0.57
Registered electors		99,813		▲8.12
JP gain from INC		Swing	▲6.92	

=== Assembly Election 1983 ===
1983 Karnataka Legislative Assembly election : Magadi
Party	Candidate	Votes	%	±%
INC	H. G. Channappa	30,947	47.67%	▲40.98
JP	T. A. Rangaiah	29,277	45.10%	▼3.98
LKD	T. C. Nagaraju	3,837	5.91%	New
Margin of victory		1,670	2.57%	▼5.77
Turnout		66,094	71.60%	▼6.46
Total valid votes		64,921		
Rejected ballots		1,173	1.77%	▼0.25
Registered electors		92,316		▲9.55
INC gain from JP		Swing	▼1.41	

=== Assembly Election 1978 ===
1978 Karnataka Legislative Assembly election : Magadi
Party	Candidate	Votes	%	±%
JP	Berraswamy Gowda	31,628	49.08%	New
INC(I)	Hulikatte. G. Channappa	26,255	40.74%	New
INC	Harthi. G. Channappa	4,311	6.69%	▼17.80
Independent	C. R. Venkatappa	1,137	1.76%	New
Independent	B. L. Prasanna Kumara Gupta	606	0.94%	New
Margin of victory		5,373	8.34%	▼17.63
Turnout		65,777	78.06%	▲14.86
Total valid votes		64,448		
Rejected ballots		1,329	2.02%	▲2.02
Registered electors		84,267		▲32.12
JP gain from Independent		Swing	▼1.66	

=== Assembly Election 1972 ===
1972 Mysore State Legislative Assembly election : Magadi
Party	Candidate	Votes	%	±%
Independent	H. G. Channappa	19,948	50.74%	New
INC(O)	C. R. Range Gowda	9,738	24.77%	New
INC	R. V. Susheelamma	9,629	24.49%	▼9.36
Margin of victory		10,210	25.97%	▲6.18
Turnout		40,311	63.20%	▼1.34
Total valid votes		39,315		
Registered electors		63,779		▲21.26
Independent gain from PSP		Swing	▼2.90	

=== Assembly Election 1967 ===
1967 Mysore State Legislative Assembly election : Magadi
Party	Candidate	Votes	%	±%
PSP	C. R. R. Gowda	16,738	53.64%	▼15.56
INC	H. G. Channappa	10,562	33.85%	▲3.05
Independent	C. R. Venkatappa	3,530	11.31%	New
Independent	P. R. S. Nath	374	1.20%	New
Margin of victory		6,176	19.79%	▼18.60
Turnout		33,948	64.54%	▲2.99
Total valid votes		31,204		
Registered electors		52,599		▲4.12
PSP hold		Swing	▼15.56	

=== Assembly Election 1962 ===
1962 Mysore State Legislative Assembly election : Magadi
Party	Candidate	Votes	%	±%
PSP	C. R. Range Gowda	20,441	69.20%	New
INC	T. D. Maranna	9,100	30.80%	▼38.66
Margin of victory		11,341	38.39%	▼0.54
Turnout		31,095	61.55%	
Total valid votes		29,541		
Registered electors		50,518		
PSP gain from INC		Swing	▼0.26	

=== Assembly By-election 1957 ===
1957 Mysore State Legislative Assembly by-election : Magadi
Party	Candidate	Votes	%	±%
INC	T. D. Maranna	19,567	69.46%	▲25.19
Independent	Honnashiddiah	8,602	30.54%	New
Margin of victory		10,965	38.93%	▲27.48
Total valid votes		28,169		
INC gain from PSP		Swing	▲13.73	

=== Assembly Election 1957 ===
1957 Mysore State Legislative Assembly election : Magadi
Party	Candidate	Votes	%	±%
PSP	B. Singri Gowda	16,165	55.73%	New
INC	T. D. Maranna	12,843	44.27%	▼4.99
Margin of victory		3,322	11.45%	▲6.09
Turnout		29,008	64.72%	▲9.10
Total valid votes		29,008		
Registered electors		44,819		▲11.64
PSP gain from INC		Swing	▲6.47	

=== Assembly Election 1952 ===
1952 Mysore State Legislative Assembly election : Magadi
Party	Candidate	Votes	%	±%
INC	S. Sidappa	10,999	49.26%	New
KMPP	B. Singri Gowda	9,803	43.90%	New
Independent	C. Rangappa Gowda	1,528	6.84%	New
Margin of victory		1,196	5.36%	
Turnout		22,330	55.62%	
Total valid votes		22,330		
Registered electors		40,147		
INC win (new seat)				

== See also ==
- Ramanagara district
- List of constituencies of Karnataka Legislative Assembly
