= ETEC Lauro Gomes =

ETE Lauro Gomes
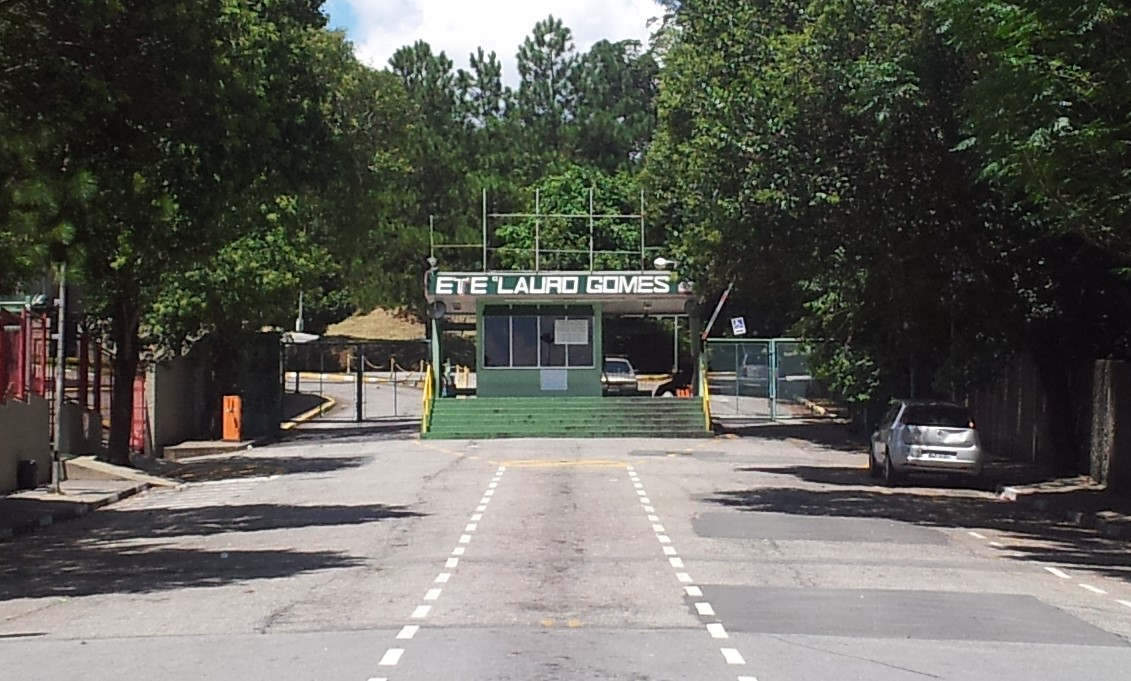
- Main entrance to ETEC Lauro Gomes photographed in March 2014. Note the old abbreviation ETE is still shown.

Location
- 400 Pereira Barreto Avenue; São Bernardo do Campo, São Paulo 09751-000; Brazil
- Coordinates: 23.69°S 46.54°W

Information
- School type: State school, Vocational school, Secondary school
- Established: October 12, 1964; 61 years ago
- Authority: CEETEPS (Centro Estadual de Educação Tecnológica Paula Souza)
- Campus type: Urban
- Color

ETEC Lauro Gomes, formerly known as ETE Lauro Gomes, ETI Lauro Gomes and Escola Técnica Industrial de São Bernardo do Campo is an educational facility located in São Bernardo do Campo, SP, Brazil. It offers secondary education and vocational education classes. It is named after Lauro Gomes de Almeida, mayor for São Bernardo do Campo between 1952 and 1954 and 1960 to 1963. ETEC Lauro Gomes is adjoined to São Paulo Technical School System, conducted by CEETEPS (Centro Estadual de Educação Tecnológica Paula Souza), an independent government body designed to govern technical schools and faculties in São Paulo.

== History ==
São Bernardo do Campo, a municipality neighboring São Paulo, started to experience a fast growth of the manufacturing sector after the inauguration of Via Anchieta, a road linking São Paulo to Santos crossing the town. In the 1950s, the traditional furniture making industry began to share space with other activities, such as pharmaceutical, home appliances and specially automotive. In 1958, Willys-Overland, Mercedes-Benz and Volkswagen already had plants in the city, thus demanding skilled workers.

In 1956 the Ministry of Education and Culture - MEC granted a ₢$20 million appropriation for the installment of the school, and in 1957 the state decree no. 3734 was established by Governor Jânio Quadros to enforce the partnership among the São Paulo Government, the Brazilian Ministry of Education and Culture and the São Bernardo do Campo Government to establish the facility. The construction has been started in 1958 at a 170,000 square metres (1,800,000 sq ft) site. In 1964 a council was set to manage a cooperation agreement between the Brazilian government and the former Federal Republic of Germany government to allow the latter to provide equipment, techniques and teachers to improve the teaching level in the school. Such agreement would allow the insertion of German educators for five years into the facility to be gradually substituted by their Brazilian counterparts. However, in 1967, the agreement was not fully operational as the school still was in construction, with a 60% completion rate and offering the construction of machines and engines as its only course, although the Industrial Engineering Faculty of the Pontifical Catholic University of São Paulo (now known as Centro Universitário da FEI) already was using part of the facilities. In the year before, the school has been named Lauro Gomes after the former city mayor died in 1964.

In the 1970s other programs have been started, such as electronics, electrotechnics, designing of tools and machining fixtures, and industrial laboratory technician. The Electronic data processing course has been established in 1985.

== Adjoining the State Technical School Center ==
In 1980, state decree no. 16309 ordered the school to join Centro Paula Souza, effective January 1, 1981, thus being one of the state-managed technical schools in São Paulo. The law has been enacted by Governor Paulo Maluf.

== The Reform ==
The vocational program and the high school programs were fused into a single lesson plan, the latter frequently adapted to match the skills needed in the first one. However the national technical education reform of 1997 deterred, in practice, the continuation of such scheme, stating only 25% of the full educational schedule could be allocated for vocational lessons. Although such resolution has been superseded in 2004, the liaisons between the vocational and the high school classes were reinstalled as an option, thus allowing the continuation of separate courses offering.

== Habilitations Offered ==
As of 2014, along with the high school classes, the following vocational habilitations are available:

- Accounting
- Business Administration
- Chemistry (derived from former industrial laboratory technician course)
- Electronics
- Industrial Automation
- Informatics (derived from former data processing course)
- Internet-oriented Informatics
- Logistics
- Mechatronics (derived from former mechanics course)
- Office management
- Power electronics (derived from former electrotechnics course)

== Admission ==
Admission to the school involves an exam called vestibulinho (Portuguese diminutive form of vestibular, the most dominant admission test employed for those seeking to ingress in a college in Brazil). It is a multiple choice test with 50 questions, ranging from Portuguese, to Math, to Natural Sciences and Human Sciences.
