= Richard Drauz =

German politician (1894–1946)

Richard Drauz (German: [ˈʁɪçaʁt ˈdʁaʊts]; 2 April 1894 – 4 December 1946) was a Nazi German politician and Kreisleiter of Heilbronn, Germany. He was also a member of the Reichstag from 1933 until the collapse of Nazi Germany at the end of World War II in Europe. Drauz was one of the most fanatical and violent Nazi Party leaders in the final days of the war. He was tried and executed by American occupation forces for war crimes in 1946.

== Early life ==
Drauz was born in Heilbronn in Württemberg, the son of postal official Christian Heinrich Drauz (1865–1937) and Friederike Johanna, née Dederer (1866–1938). His parents were from old Heilbronn vintner families. After attending middle and high school in Heilbronn, he became a mechanic's apprentice. He enlisted in the German Army at the start of World War I and rose to the rank of Feldwebel (Sergeant) by 1918. After the war, he studied at the Hochschule Esslingen in Esslingen am Neckar and from 1921 to 1928 worked at the Maschinenfabrik Esslingen as a refrigeration engineer. There he met Wilhelm Murr, a Nazi Party agitator who later became Gauleiter and then Reichsstatthalter of Württemberg. On 1 April 1928, Drauz joined the Nazi Party as Member number 80,730, and shortly afterwards he and his family moved to Dortmund. His employment there is unclear.

== Rise to Power ==
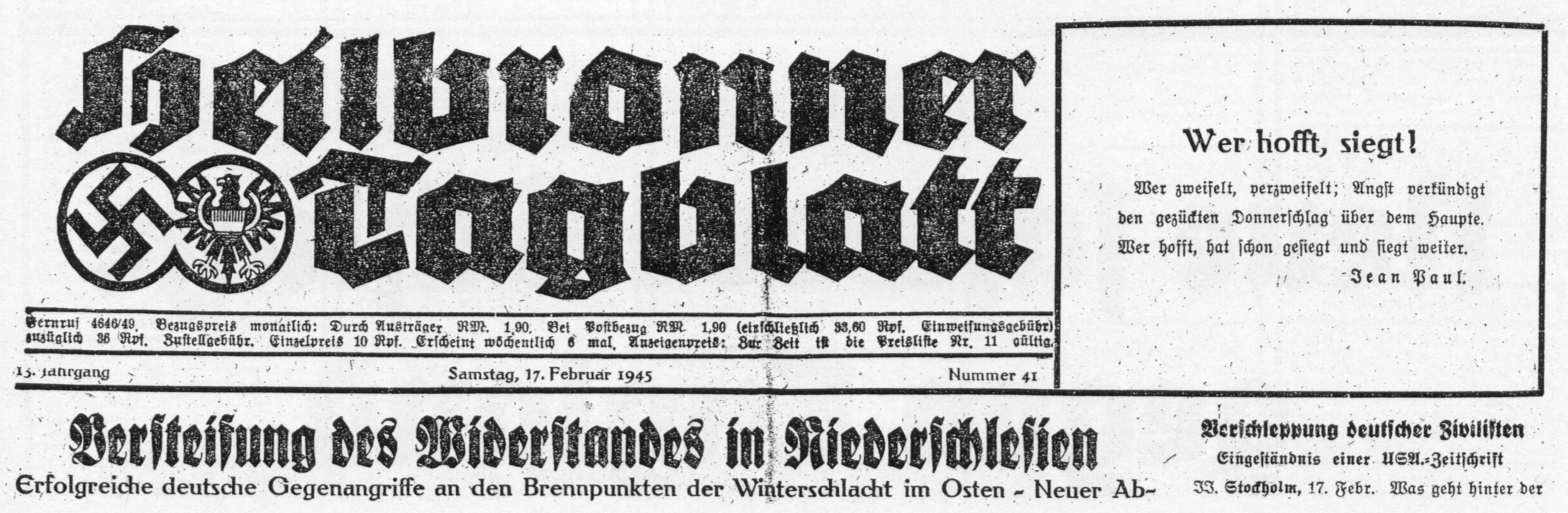
Feb. 1945 Masthead of Richard Drauz's propaganda mouthpiece, the Heilbronner Tagblatt. The box on the right reads: Whoever Hopes, Wins!.

In 1932, Wilhelm Murr, the new Party Gauleiter of Württemberg, appointed Drauz as the Nazi Party District Leader in Heilbronn. The city, with its loyal SPD/DDP social-democratic electorate, was a problem for the Party. Drauz returned to his home city to impose "National Socialist virtue," by force if necessary. He was made director of the Nazi daily party newspaper, the Heilbronner Tagblatt, a position he used to spread propaganda, harass enemies, and make calls to action. After the Nazi Seizure of Power on 30 January 1933, Drauz pushed all other Heilbronn newspapers out of business through raids, property seizures, and advertiser intimidation. In July 1933, a large group of Sturmabteilung (SA) storm troopers attacked the former Lord Mayor Emil Beutinger, who had been critical of the Nazis. Beutinger's home was damaged, but he escaped unharmed. Police proceedings against 40 suspects were suppressed by Drauz.

He was rewarded for his actions, first appointed Political Commissar for the greater Heilbronn Landkreis and then made an honorary SA-Sturmbannführer. From August 1933, he gained membership on the Heilbronn City Council, and as such, was also appointed deputy to Oberbürgermeister (Lord Mayor) Heinrich Gültig on 12 October. This was a formality, as Drauz already had authority over Gültig in the party hierarchy. In the national elections of November 1933, Drauz also won a seat in the Reichstag for electoral constituency 31, Württemberg, and he retained this seat until the fall of the Nazi regime in May 1945.

By 1938, Drauz had gained significant positions on the boards of many companies, associations, and unions in Heilbronn, such as Heilbronn Maschinenbau-Gesellschaft, Glashütte Heilbronn AG, the Portland Cement Plant in Lauffen am Neckar, and even the VfR Heilbronn football club. He responded to the rejection of his request for a supervisory board position at the food manufacturer Knorr (brand) with hate mail and abusive articles in the Tagblatt. As the result of district reforms on 1 October 1938, Heilbronn became the seat of the newly created Heilbronn County and the previously independent towns of Böckingen, Sontheim, and Neckargartach were annexed.

Drauz was unpopular with many people, even within the Nazis' own ranks. There were several proceedings against him before the Party's Internal District Court. In 1934, two complainants accused him of "purely arbitrary policies of violence" and of leading "an immoral lifestyle that defies description and will harm the overall movement," pointing to notorious street drinking sessions and numerous adulterous love affairs. All proceedings ended with acquittal, probably due to the patronage of Gauleiter Wilhelm Murr. Drauz responded by insulting his internal party opponents, initiating smear campaigns, and dismissing them from any party functions he could. While his reputation may have been tarnished, his career remained unharmed: In 1943, he was appointed Oberbereichsleiter, and he acquired additional district management roles in Vaihingen an der Enz and Ludwigsburg.

== World War II ==
After news of the German defeat at Stalingrad in 1943, Drauz was continuously active in delivering propaganda at the behest of the Party. He delivered speeches nearly every day in front of local Nazi rallies in the city and county of Heilbronn. His speeches typically conjured up memories of the First World War to emphasize how much victory depended on their attitude and loyalty.

On 16 January 1944, Drauz attended a Party meeting which adopted "Struggle, Work, Faith" as the slogan of the year, and on 30 January in Heilbronn's Marktplatz, he announced a policy of Endsieg. In August 1944, he ordered the managers of Heilbronn-based companies to an information session, during which he demanded full mobilization of all available resources for "Total War". One result was the discontinuation of the Metropolitan Orchestra and Municipal Theater. Any remaining cultural life in the city was broken after the first heavy bombing raids on 10 September 1944, replaced only by Drauz's "Rallying Calls".

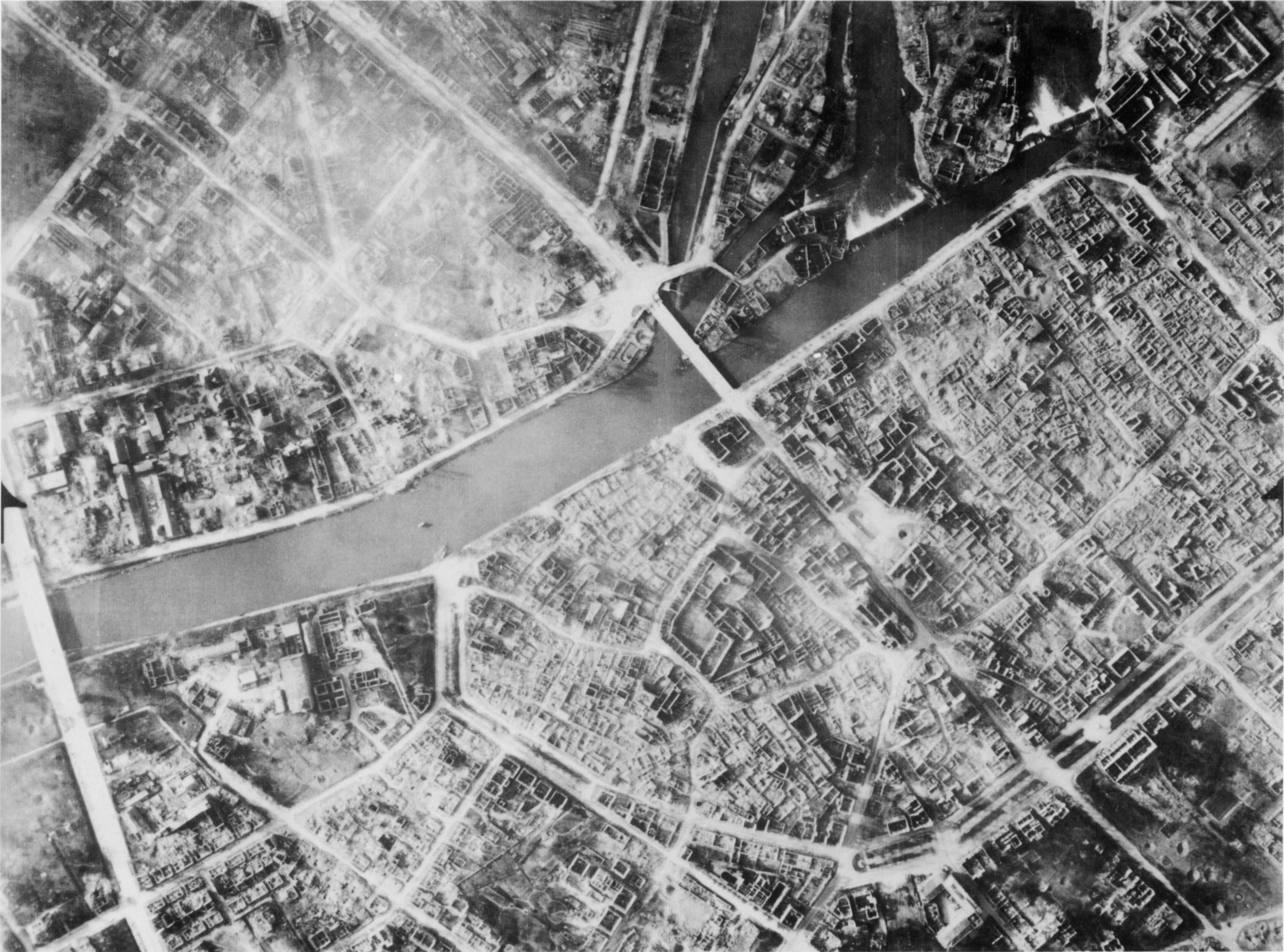
Aerial view of bomb-damaged Heilbronn city center, March 1945

Despite his arbitrary leadership, Drauz became more serious about evacuation plans for the city behind the scenes, although far too late. Initial air raids had killed about 300 people, and Drauz carefully argued to his boss, Gauleiter and now Reich Defense Commissioner Murr, that a large-scale attack on the densely populated city center would result in heavy loss of life because of its confined position on the Neckar. Murr refused to permit any evacuation, not only because it would be "defeatist" but, more practically, any evacuees would have no place to go. Drauz's prediction became a tragic reality on 4 December 1944, when a major raid completely destroyed the city center and killed over 6,500 people, including 1,000 children, the majority of whom were incinerated in a fire storm. It became the worst bombing experience of any city in Württemberg.

In the final months of the war, Drauz became increasingly desperate and violent in trying to follow Hitler's commands. As a result of the Nero Decree in March 1945, Drauz sought to turn what remained of the ruined city into scorched earth, for example, giving orders to blow up the Neckarsulm Vehicle Factory. His goal was largely resisted by the population because defeat was obvious. However, it partly succeeded through his orders to withdraw any remaining fire brigades. He ordered every district village to be turned into a bastion and to fight to the last on penalty of death. On 3 April 1945, as Allied ground forces approached, Drauz had Ortsgruppenleiter Karl Taubenberger shot because he failed to prevent residents from removing a tank barricade. He left Taubenberger's corpse on display on the main road with a sign around his neck that read, "I am a national traitor".

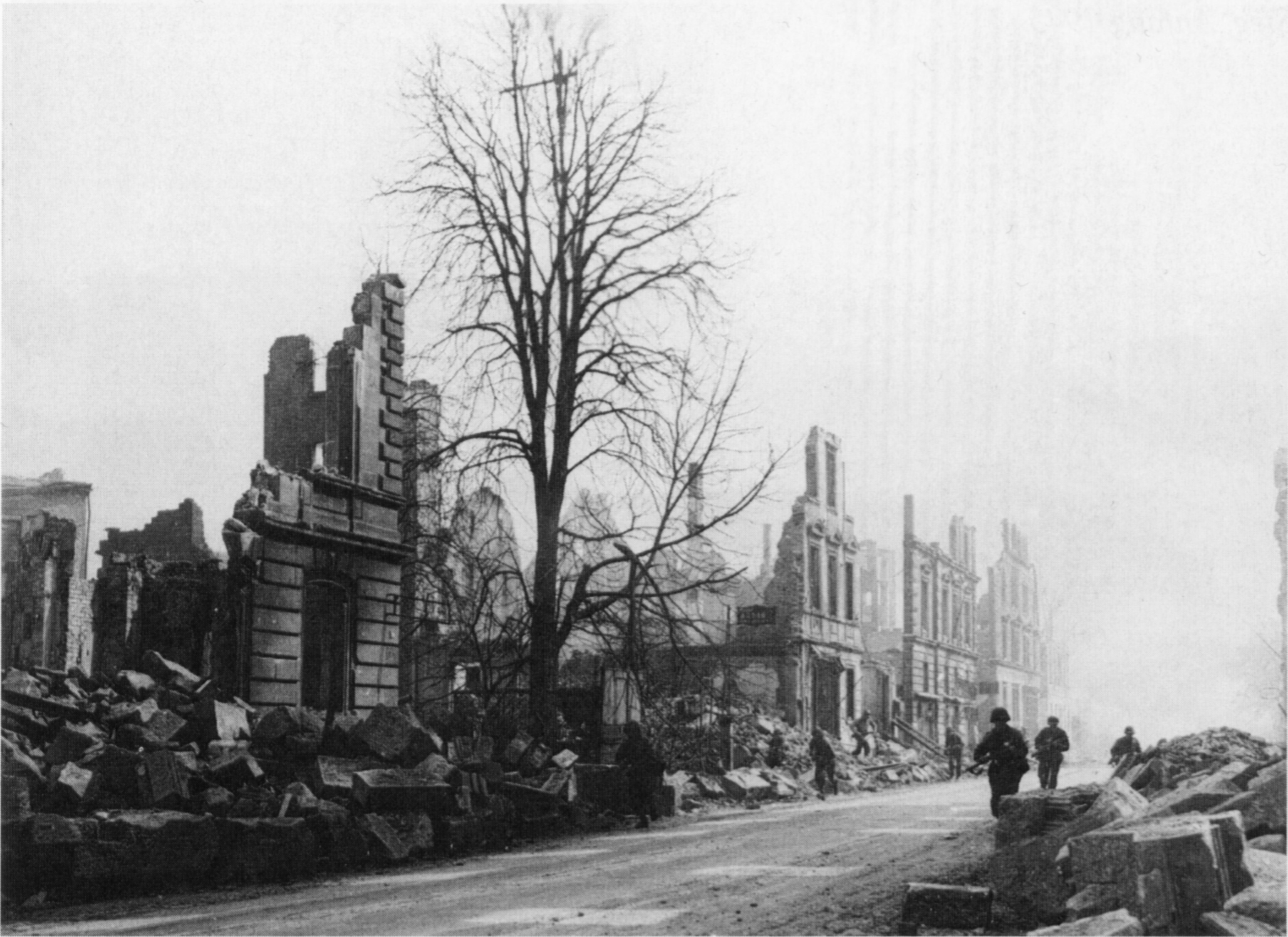
Street fighting in Heilbronn, April 1945

The final Battle of Heilbronn began on 4 April 1945. By 6 April, recognizing that the city center could not be held but refusing to accept defeat, Drauz disbanded his District Office, burned records and the Party Flag, and fled in two cars with a large escort. Upon reaching Schweinsbergstraße, the entourage saw white flags flying from five or six homes, including that of City Council member Karl Kübler. The inhabitants had been advised to raise the flags by retreating Wehrmacht troops, who had described the superior strength of approaching American forces. Drauz stopped the car and ordered, "get out, shoot, shoot everything!" Three companions indiscriminately shot at anyone who showed up at a window or opened a door. Kübler's wife Anna, standing protectively in front of her husband, was murdered, as well as Kübler himself, the 72-year-old pastor Gustav Beyer, and 46-year-old Elsa Drebinger. Heilbronn Dairy director Karl Weber, who barely escaped the hail of bullets, later reported that Kübler had been given authority by mayor Heinrich Gültig to surrender the city without a fight, but Drauz "was too powerful and would not allow surrender."

Drauz's actions directly resulted in the deaths of 14 civilians, and his orders to fanatical paramilitary units to fight to the end culminated in another week of bitter hand-to-hand fighting, needlessly costing hundreds more lives and further destroying what was left of the city. Unlike Stuttgart, whose mayor Karl Strölin had quietly negotiated his city's surrender, Heilbronn was not spared this final agony because of Drauz.

== Arrest and execution ==
At the war's end in May 1945, Drauz was already being sought by the US Army because of his involvement in the summary execution of an American POW that previous March. Now a fugitive, he fled initially to Tübingen with his family. The couple then left their children behind with a tutor and escaped under false papers into the Rhineland, where they took shelter at Dernbach Monastery in Montabaur. In July 1945, when his wife learned that their children had been abandoned by the tutor, she went back across American lines and brought them to her hometown of Talheim. There, the US Counter Intelligence Corps was waiting for her. After a long interrogation, the CIC learned her husband's location and his false name of "Richard Binder". CIC agent Al Sandwina and investigator Helmut F.W. Frey then drove by Jeep to the monastery, where with guns drawn they found a man in a small garden house answering to the name "Binder". The agents already knew this name from the false passport. When confronted, Drauz fell apart and was arrested without further incident.

He was tried by the American General Military Government Court (US vs. Richard Drauz, Case Number 12-1182-1) in the Dachau Trials. The court determined that on 24 March 1945, he shot and killed a downed American Airman who had surrendered in the village of Dürrenzimmern, in the Heilbronn district of Brackenheim, a war crime under the Third Geneva Convention. In his defense, he stated that the American pilot represented "Anglo-American air gangsters" who had indiscriminately murdered hundreds of thousands of civilians in Dresden, Hamburg, and other cities. Drauz was found guilty and sentenced to death on 11 December 1945. Transferred to Landsberg Prison, he was executed by hanging on 4 December 1946.

In the aftermath, Heilbronn's new newspaper, the Heilbronner Stimme (Voice of Heilbronn), remarked that "he was a particularly nasty specimen of the Nazi movement". For his brutality, indiscriminate murder, and responsibility in the final agony of their city, Drauz remains a figure of contempt in Heilbronn to this day.
