= Hide and Seek (2024 film) =

2024 Indian crime thriller film

- Theatrical release poster
- Directed by: Punith Nagaraj
- Produced by: Vasanth M. Rao Kulkarni; Punith Nagaraj
- Starring: Anup Revanna; Dhanya Ramkumar
- Cinematography: Rijo P. Jhon
- Edited by: Madhu Tumbakere
- Music by: Sandy Addanki
- Production company: Suneri Art Creations
- Release date: 15 March 2024
- Country: India
- Language: Kannada

Hide and Seek is a 2024 Indian Kannada-language crime thriller film directed by Punith Nagaraj. The film was bankrolled by Vasanth M. Rao Kulkarni and Punith Nagaraj under the banner of Suneri Art Creations. The film features Anup Revanna and Dhanya Ramkumar in lead roles, alongside Mythri Jaggi, Suraj, Bala Rajwadi, Krishna Hebbale, Rajesh Nataranga, and Aravind Rao in supporting roles.

== Cast ==
- Anup Revanna
- Dhanya Ramkumar as Haasini
- Mythri Jaggi
- Bala Rajwadi
- Krishna Hebbale
- Rajesh Nataranga
- Aravind Rao

== Production ==
The director, Punith Nagaraj, took four years to develop the project. Dhanya Ramkumar signed the project because she wanted to be featured in a thriller film. She plays Haasini, a businessman's daughter who gets kidnapped and subsequently falls in love with her captor, played by Anup Revanna. The film was shot over thirty days in and around Bangalore, Magadi, and Chikmagalur. The cinematography was by Rijo P. Jhon, while the editing was handled by Madhu Tumbakere.

== Soundtrack ==
Hide and Seek

Soundtrack album by Sandy Addanki
- Released: 2024
- Genre: Feature film soundtrack
- Length: 3:18
- Language: Kannada
- Label: A2 Music

External audio
- Kaduve Nee Yeke (From "Hide & Seek") on YouTube

The soundtrack was composed by Sandy Addanki.

Track listing
No.	Title	Lyrics	Singer(s)	Length
1.	"Kaduve Nee Yeke"	Pramod Maravanthe	Sangeetha Ravindranath	3:18
Total length:				3:18

== Release ==
Hide and Seek was released theatrically on 15 March 2024.

== Reception ==
Vinay Lokesh of The Times of India rated the film three out of five stars and wrote that "The narrative could have had more meat in the first half - this would have made it more interesting. The latter half of the story has enough twists and turns to keep the audience hooked." Shashiprasad SM of Times Now gave it two out of five stars and wrote that "Hide and Seek comes across as an ordinary film that does not have much to offer in terms of thrills."
