= Esslingen University of Applied Sciences =

Coordinates: 48°44′17.00″N 9°18′39.70″E

- Hochschule Esslingen
- Type: Public
- Established: 1868
- President: Christof Wolfmaier
- Academic staff: 229
- Students: 6.069
- Location: Esslingen am Neckar, Baden-Württemberg, Germany
- Website: http://www.hs-esslingen.de

Esslingen University of Applied Sciences or Hochschule Esslingen is a public University of Applied Sciences in Esslingen am Neckar, Germany. It has 11 faculties, 25 bachelor's programmes and 12 master's programmes. The focus of Esslingen University of Applied Sciences is on engineering, management, social sciences, as well as health care and nursing sciences.

Esslingen is ranked among the top Universities of Applied Sciences in Germany, and has strong programmes in the areas of Business Administration, Mechanical and Electrical Engineering, IT and Engineering with Business Studies. The university cooperates closely with the local economy and has partnerships with well-established companies such as Daimler, Porsche, Bosch, Festo, Eberspächer which have major operations in the vicinity.

== History ==
In 1868, Stuttgart's Royal Württemberg School of Construction opened a department to train mechanical engineers. Soon, demand for this programme was so high that the school in Stuttgart expanded to Esslingen. Industrial development in Esslingen was very advanced, especially in the area of engineering. In the following years, the spectrum of education was broadened, the school offering courses in electrical engineering, precision engineering, telecommunications, heating and ventilation. In 1938, the school was renamed the State Engineering School of Esslingen and in 1971, as Esslingen University of Applied Sciences, it added technical computer science and engineering management to its existing programs.

The Soziale Frauenschule (Social Women's School) of the Schwäbischen Frauenverein (Swabian Women's Association) was started in 1917 by a foundation established by Queen Charlotte of Wuerttemberg. This was the forerunner to the University of Applied Sciences for Social Work.

In 1998, reacting to the demands of industry, Esslingen University of Applied Sciences started its first English-language master's program, the MBA in International Industrial Management. The Esslingen MBA was one of the pioneers of international, English-language programs at Fachhochschulen, the forerunner of Universities of Applied Sciences, in Germany; the Fachhochschulen had been allowed to offer international degrees such as the MBA through the 1998 modification of the Hochschulrahmengesetz (Higher Education Framework Act). The Esslingen Graduate School now runs and organizes three master's programs entirely in English.

On 1 October 2006, the two Esslingen Universities of Applied Sciences – Technology and Social Work – were merged.

== Campus ==
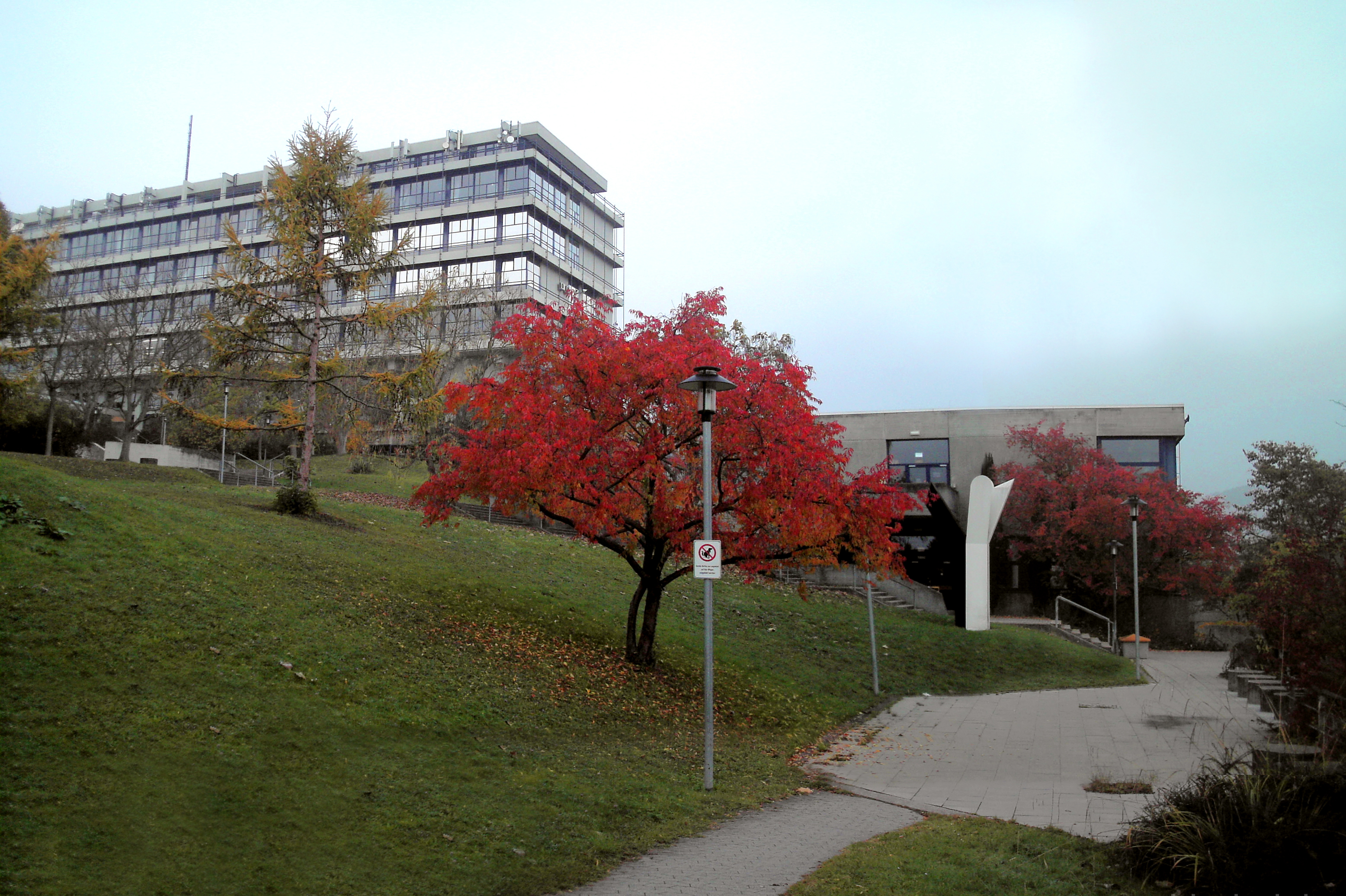
Hilltop Campus (Flandernstraße)

- Hilltop Campus – Hochschulzentrum (HZE)
- City Campus – Stadtmitte
- Göppingen Campus

Esslingen University of Applied Sciences has three locations: the main city campus is situated in the centre of Esslingen and is an architectural mix of the neo-classical and the futuristic modern. Because the original engineering school in Esslingen was located directly across from the Royal Riding Stables, the city campus is referred to as "der Stall" (the stable).

The hilltop campus is known as the Acropolis. The huge concrete block from the 1960s is prominently situated on the city's northern hills and provides a good view of Esslingen and the entire Neckar Valley.

The new campus in Göppingen is a short train ride away from Esslingen. The Göppingen campus is home to the Faculty of Management and Technology, and is a centre for innovation, technology and sustainability.

== Faculties ==
- Science, Energy and Building Services
- Computer Science and Engineering
- Mechanical and Systems Engineering
- Mobility and Technology
- Social Work, Education and Nursing Sciences
- Management and Technology

== Traditions ==
Kandelmarsch (Graduates' parade)

This unique custom at Esslingen University of Applied Sciences sees students taking part in a ritual march through Esslingen's old medieval city after graduation. The tradition is said to derive from an incident in 1922 where a group of students, tipsy after a gathering, for unknown reasons resolved to carry a ladder through the city. Being told by one policeman to not walk on the street and by another to not walk on the pavement, they decided to walk with one feet on both; the German word Kandel means "gutter".

== Notable alumni ==
- Werner Dieter
- Richard Drauz; (1894-1946) in Landsberg Lech (executed as a war criminal), headed up the NSDAP in the Heilbronn district
- Ludwig Dürr
- Eugen Eisenmann
- Heinz Illi
- Manfred R. Kuehnle
- Siegbert E. Lapp
- Theodor Koch
- Gerhard Neipp
- Werner Niefer
- Ingo Rust
- Hans Erich Slany
- Hubert Zimmerer

== See also ==
- Education in Germany
- List of universities in Germany
