= A. Manjunath =

Indian politician

Member of Karnataka Legislative Assembly
- In office 2018–2023
- Preceded by: H C Balakrishna
- Succeeded by: H. C. Balakrishna
- Constituency: Magadi

Personal details
- Born: 21 May 1974 (age 51) Ramanagara
- Party: Janata Dal (Secular)
- Occupation: Politician

A. Manjunath is an Indian politician. He was elected to the Karnataka Legislative Assembly from Magadi in 2018 Karnataka Legislative Assembly Election and won by a margin of 51,425 votes.
