= Dayananda Sagar College of Engineering =

Autonomous engineering college in Karnataka, India

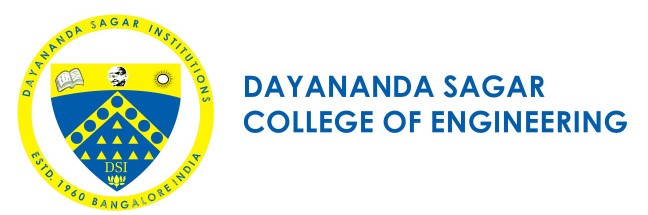
- Type: Private (autonomous)
- Established: 1979
- Founder: R. Dayananda Sagar
- Parent institution: Dayananda Sagar Institutions
- Accreditation: Accredited Grade A by NAAC, CGPA 3.20 (valid until June 2027)
- Affiliations: Visvesvaraya Technological University
- Chairperson: Dr. D. Hemachandra Sagar
- Location: Shavige Malleshwara Hills, 1st Stage, Kumaraswamy Layout, Bengaluru, Karnataka, India
- Campus: Urban, 30.8 acres
- Approvals: AICTE
- Website: dsce.edu.in

Dayananda Sagar College of Engineering (commonly referred to as DSCE) is a private autonomous engineering college located in Bengaluru, Karnataka, India.

== History ==
Dayananda Sagar College of Engineering was established in 1979 by philanthropist late Sri R. Dayananda Sagar. The college is managed by the Mahatma Gandhi Vidya Peetha Trust (MGVP) and is part of Dayananda Sagar Institutions, which runs multiple educational and healthcare establishments in Bengaluru.

== Academics ==
=== Academic Programmes ===
DSCE offers courses towards Bachelor of Engineering (B.E), Master of Technology (MTech), Master of Computer Applications (MCA) and Doctor of Philosophy (PhD).

The medium of instruction for all the courses at the college is English.

=== Departments and courses ===
==== Undergraduate ====
These 20 departments offer four-year undergraduate Bachelor of Engineering (BE) courses. All of the undergraduate courses have been conferred autonomous status by the Visvesvaraya Technological University.

- Artificial Intelligence and Machine Learning
- Aerospace Engineering
- Automobile Engineering
- Biotechnology
- Computer Science & Engineering
- Computer Science and Business Systems
- Computer Science & Engineering (Cyber Security)
- Computer Science & Engineering (Data Science)
- Computer Science & Engineering (Internet of Things, Cyber Security, and Blockchain)
- Computer Science and Design
- Chemical Engineering
- Civil Engineering
- Electrical & Electronics Engineering
- Electronics & Communication Engineering
- Information Science & Engineering
- Electronics & Instrumentation Engineering
- Mechanical Engineering
- Medical Electronics Engineering
- Electronics & Telecommunication Engineering
- Robotics and Artificial Intelligence

All academic programs are affiliated with Visvesvaraya Technological University (VTU), Belagavi, and the college has been granted academic autonomy by VTU and the University Grants Commission (India) (UGC) since 2015.

==== Postgraduate ====
The institute offers the following postgraduate programmes:

- Master of Business Administration (MBA)
- Master of Computer Applications (MCA)
- Master of Technology (MTech) in:
  - Computer Science & Engineering
  - VLSI Design and Embedded Systems
  - Structural Engineering
  - Highway Technology

== Accreditation and Affiliations ==
DSCE is accreditation with National Assessment and Accreditation Council (NAAC), valid until June 2027.

The college is approved by the All India Council for Technical Education (AICTE) and affiliated to Visvesvaraya Technological University.

== Rankings ==
The National Institutional Ranking Framework (NIRF) ranked DSCE in the 100-300 band among engineering colleges in India in 2024.

== Notable alumni ==
- Sunil Abraham, director of Public Policy, Facebook India
- Chaitra H. G., singer
- Nosthush Kenjige, American cricketer
- Shubha Phutela, model and actress
- Anup Revanna, actor
- Sudeepa, actor
