= Faculdade de Engenharia de Sorocaba =

Higher education institution in Brazil

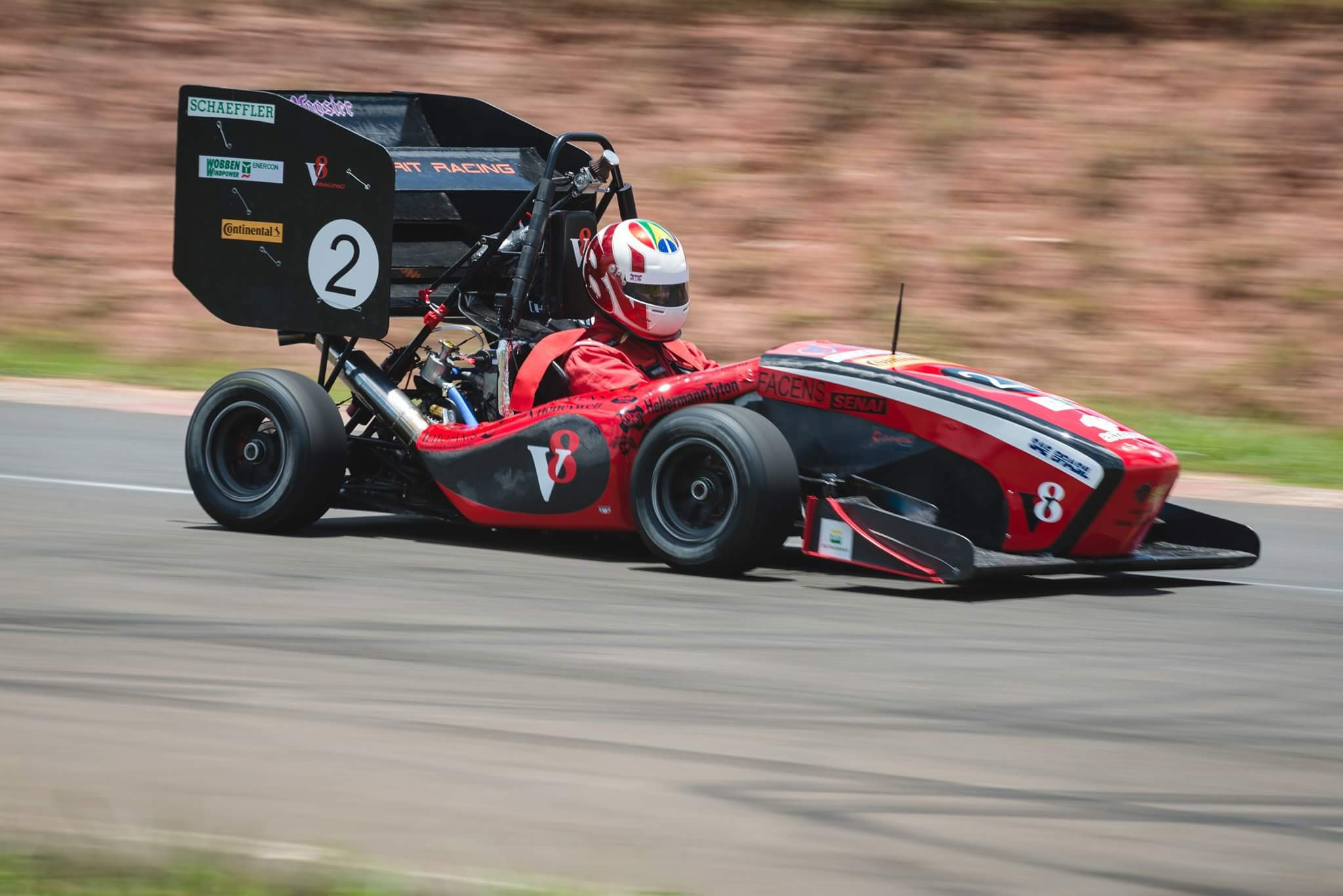
V8 Racing team - Faculdade de Engenharia de Sorocaba - Champions of FSAE Brasil 2017

Centro Universitário Facens, or UniFacens (formerly Faculdade de Engenharia de Sorocaba), is a private university in Sorocaba, Brazil founded in 1976. It is a private non-profit maintained by the Sorocaban Cultural Association of Technological Renovation (Associação Cultural de Renovação Tecnológica Sorocabana; ACRTS).

== Undergraduate programs ==
=== Architecture ===
- Architecture and Urbanism

=== Engineering ===
- Agricultural Engineering
- Civil Engineering
- Food Engineering
- Computer Engineering
- Production Engineering
- Electrical Engineering
- Mechanical Engineering
- Mechatronics Engineering
- Chemical Engineering

=== Health sciences ===
- Biomedicine
- Nursing
- Veterinary Medicine
- Dentistry
- Psychology

=== Technology degrees ===
- Technology in Systems Analysis and Development
- Technology in IT Management
- Technology in Digital Games

== Facilities ==
- LIGA (Innovation Laboratory for Games and Apps)
- LINCE (Innovation and Student Competitions Laboratory)
- FACE (Facens Center for Entrepreneurship)
- LIS (Social Innovation Laboratory)
- CEDEPS (Center for Product and Systems Development)

== LINCE ==
LINCE is a learning center where undergraduate and graduate students develop applied projects in teams. Projects include students participating in engineering competitions such as Formula SAE, robotics, and aerospace design.
