= Shizuoka Institute of Science and Technology =

Coordinates: 34°44′19″N 137°57′41″E

Shizuoka University of Science and Technology
- 静岡理工科大学
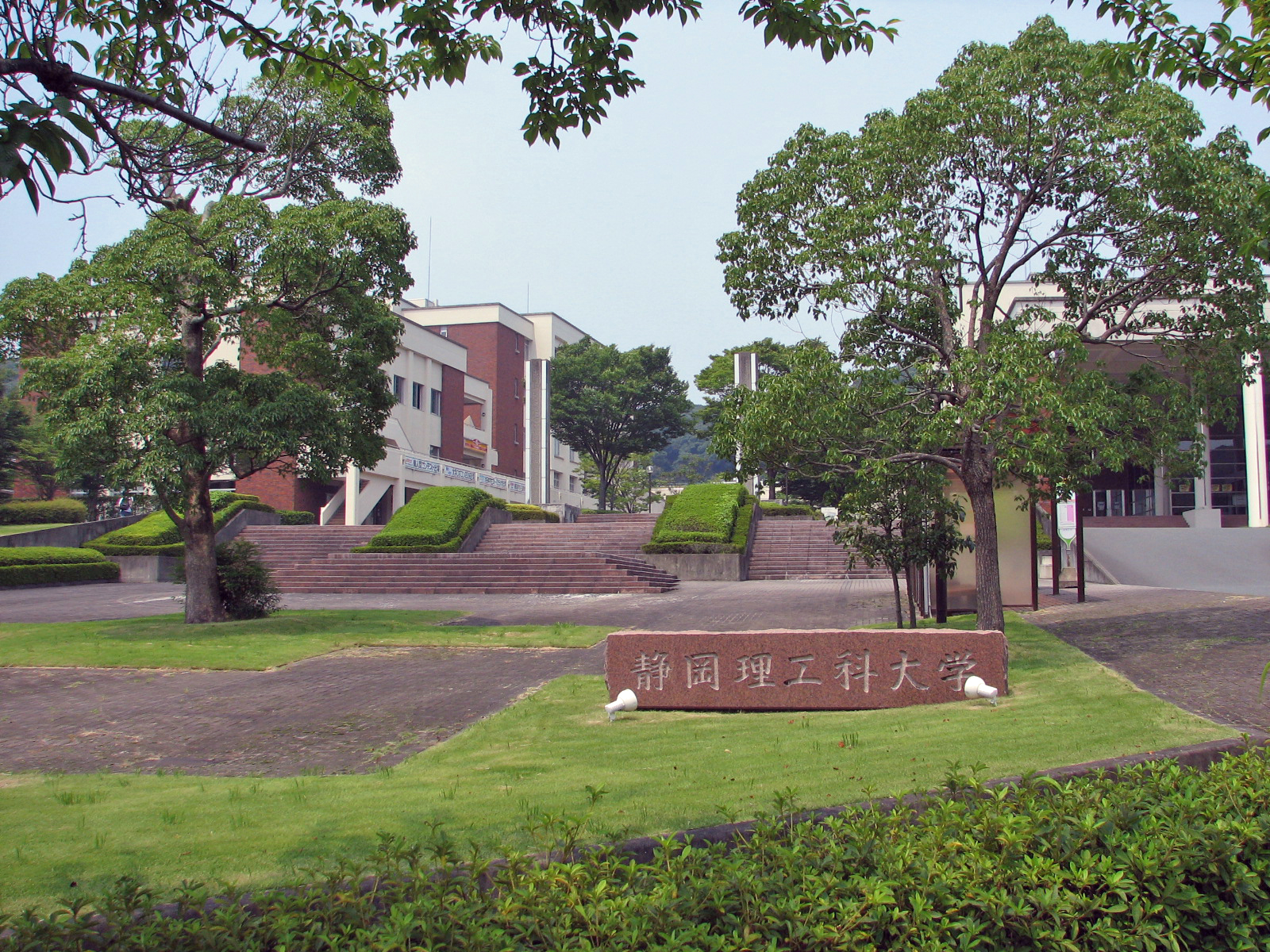
- Shizuoka University of Science and Technology
- Type: Private
- Established: 1940; university from 1991
- Students: 1400
- Location: 2200-2 Toyosawa, Fukuroi, Shizuoka Prefecture 437-8555, Fururoi, Shizuoka, Japan
- Nickname: SIST

Shizuoka University of Science and Technology (静岡理工科大学, Shizuoka Rikōka Daigaku), or SIST, is a private university in Fukuroi, Shizuoka, Japan.

The predecessor of the school was founded in 1940 as a driving school. It was chartered as a university in 1991, specializing in mechanical engineering, electrical engineering and computer technology. The university has approximately 1500 students in two faculties: the Faculty of Science and Technology and the Faculty of Comprehensive Informatics.

The university has reciprocal relationships with Daegu University in South Korea and Zhejiang Gongshang University in China.
