= Centro Universitário da FEI =

University in São Bernardo do Campo, Brazil

University Center of FEI
- Centro Universitário FEI
- Former names: Faculty of Industrial Engineering (FEI); Superior School of Business Administration (ESAN); Faculty of Information Technology (FCI)
- Type: Private
- Established: 1941; 85 years ago
- Affiliations: Society of Jesus
- Chancellor: Fabio do Prado
- President: Father Theodoro Paulo Severino Peters, S.J.
- Vice-Chancellor: Marcelo Antonio Pavanello
- Rector: Sc.D. Prof. Fábio do Prado,
- Academic staff: ~350
- Students: ~8250
- Location: Campus 1 - S. B. do Campo 23.725203°S 46.579959°W Campus 2 - São Paulo; 23.564472°S 46.635495°W; State of S. Paulo, Brazil
- Website: FEI.edu.br
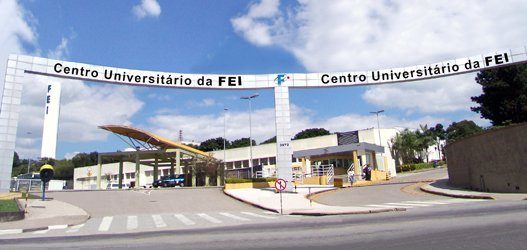

Centro Universitário da FEI is a higher education facility in São Bernardo do Campo, Brazil, offering undergraduate degrees in engineering, business administration, and computer sciences as well as master's degrees in mechanical engineering, electrical engineering, and administration; specialization courses are also offered. It is often ranked among the best Brazilian private engineering colleges and best overall in mechanical engineering, electrical engineering, and computer science.

FEI is an abbreviation for Fundação Educacional Inaciana (Portuguese for Educational Foundation of Ignatius), but had meant in the past Faculdade de Engenharia Industrial (Portuguese for Faculty of Industrial Engineering).

== History ==
Rev. Sabóia de Medeiros, S.J., founded colleges of business and engineering in São Paulo for the fast-growing industrial sector in Brazil. The Superior School of Business Administration (Escola Superior de Administração de Negócios - ESAN) came in 1941 and was then the only business school in Latin America, influenced by the Harvard Business School model. The Faculty of Industrial Engineering (Faculdade de Engenharia Industrial - FEI) offering a Chemical Engineering undergraduate degree came in 1946. In 1946 also these two colleges joined the Catholic University of São Paulo, later Pontifical Catholic University of São Paulo, but remained affiliated only until 1971.

In 1963, the Faculty of Industrial Engineering was founded in São Bernardo do Campo, provisionally sharing the city's Industrial Technical School facilities (nowadays ETEC Lauro Gomes). The ceremony was attended by the President of Brazil João Goulart. In 1965, the São Bernardo do Campo campus was inaugurated with a 4,600 square metres (50,000 sq ft) building, and plans for a 40,000 square metres (430,000 sq ft) total site area. At that time, FEI offered undergraduate courses in Mechanical, Electrical, and Chemical Engineering, as well as associate degrees in Automotive, HVAC, machine tools, Textile, Metallurgy, Electronics, and Electrotechnics Operational Engineering. (Note: At that time, Brazil had two categories for the engineering courses, Engineer (Engenheiro) and Operational Engineer (Engenheiro Operacional), the first with full capabilities and the second with regulatory limitations, yielding to shorter programs and reduced scope. The Operational Engineer career in Brazil was replaced by the Technologist (Tecnólogo).) In 1969, FEI sought an agreement with the Polytechnic School of the University of São Paulo and the Instituto Mauá de Tecnologia to improve its admission test (known as vestibular in Brazil), called MAPOFEI, by using essay rather than multiple choice questions. The partnership ended in 1977 when the University of São Paulo decided to merge all admission tests of its many colleges in a single exam conducted by FUVEST, a foundation established for that purpose. FCI, the IT branch, was founded in 1999.

Nowadays, the campus at São Bernardo do Campo has 18 buildings on a 24 hectare (60 acres) site and the campus in São Paulo occupies about one hectare (2 acres).

== Elevation to University Center ==
In 2001, the Brazilian Government established a new rule on higher education, allowing for the foundation of universities which, unlike faculties, could initiate and terminate courses. FEI, ESAN, and FCI formed a new university center in 2002, at first called UniFEI. The "Uni" was added as a common designation for universities but had to be dropped since it was already in use by the former Escola Federal de Engenharia de Itajubá (Federal Engineering School of Itajubá) - EFEI, upgraded to university under the name Federal University of Itajubá (Universidade Federal de Itajubá) - UNIFEI. So FEI remains the acronym for the amalgamated Centro Universitário da Fundação Educacional Inaciana Pe. Sabóia de Medeiros (University Center of Educational Foundation of Ignatius Father Sabóia de Medeiros).

== Courses ==
Along with many specialization courses, as of 2014 the following degrees are offered:

=== Undergraduate degrees ===
- Automation and Control Engineering
- Chemical Engineering
- Civil Engineering
- Electrical Engineering
- Materials Engineering
- Mechanical Engineering
- Production Engineering
- Textile Engineering
- Business Administration
- Computer Science

=== Master's degrees ===
- Administration (specialism in Innovative Management)
- Electrical Engineering (specialism in Integrated Electronic Devices, AI applied to Automation)
- Mechanical Engineering (specialisms in Materials & Processes, Production, Mobility Systems)

== Achievements ==
FEI sponsors a team for Baja SAE, a competition promoted by the Society of Automotive Engineers in which students design and build an off-road vehicle for evaluation. FEI won 1st place in the 2004 Midwest Awards and in the 2007 Briggs & Stratton Overall Awards, and again won the B&S Overall in 2008. In 2006, an experiment called Effect of Microgravity on Kinetic Properties of Enzymatic Reactions - MEK, carried out by some FEI researchers, was taken aboard the 13th expedition to the International Space Station, in cooperation with the Russian Federal Space Agency and the Brazilian Space Agency. The experiments were conducted by the Brazilian astronaut Marcos Pontes. The first space mission was carried out on February 6, 2000, during the Lençois Maranhenses Operation in Alcântara, with the project "Immobilization of Lipase by Covalent Bonding on Silica Enhanced with Glutaraldehyde." The mission advanced under the guidance of Prof. Adriana Lucarini and student José Angelo Maringoli Limonge.

== See also ==
- List of Jesuit sites
