= Mičevec =

- Coordinates: 45.753331°N 16.052811°E

Area
  - Total: 4.2 km^{2} (1.6 sq mi)

Population (2021)
  - Total: 1,251
  - Density: 300/km^{2} (770/sq mi)

Mičevec is a village in Central Croatia, located north of Velika Gorica. The population is 1,286 (census 2011).
