= FH Joanneum =

College in Graz, Austria

Coordinates: 47°04′10″N 15°24′26″E

- Established: 1995
- Managing Directors: Corinna Engelhardt-Nowitzki, Martin Payer
- Academic staff: 385 (2021)
- Students: 5,192 (2024/25)
- Location: Graz, Kapfenberg, Bad Gleichenberg, Austria
- Website: fh-joanneum.at/en/
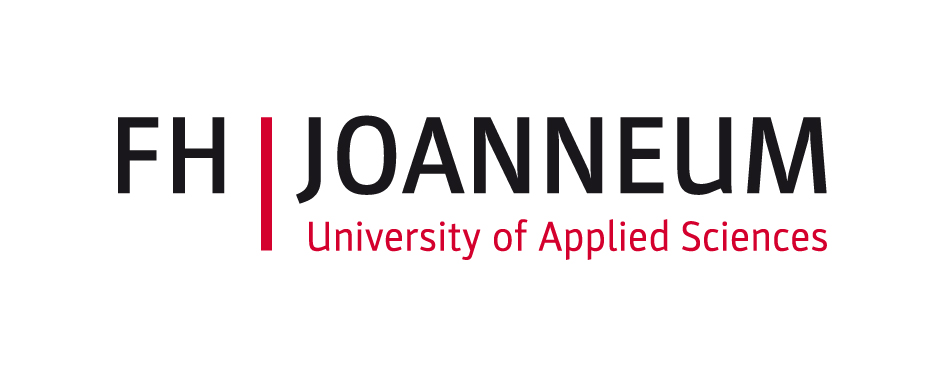

FH Joanneum is one of the largest universities of applied sciences (UAS) in Austria. It has about 5,000 students and about 750 employees. The main campus is located in Graz and there are two additional locations in Kapfenberg and Bad Gleichenberg. All three are situated in the province Styria in Austria. FH Joanneum offers almost 70 degree programs in a variety of areas including business, technology, design, media, architecture, health and social services. The programmes are practically oriented, project-based and interdisciplinary.

== History ==
FH Joanneum was established in 1994. In 2001 the campus in Bad Gleichenberg started to offer health related degree programmes.

== Gallery ==
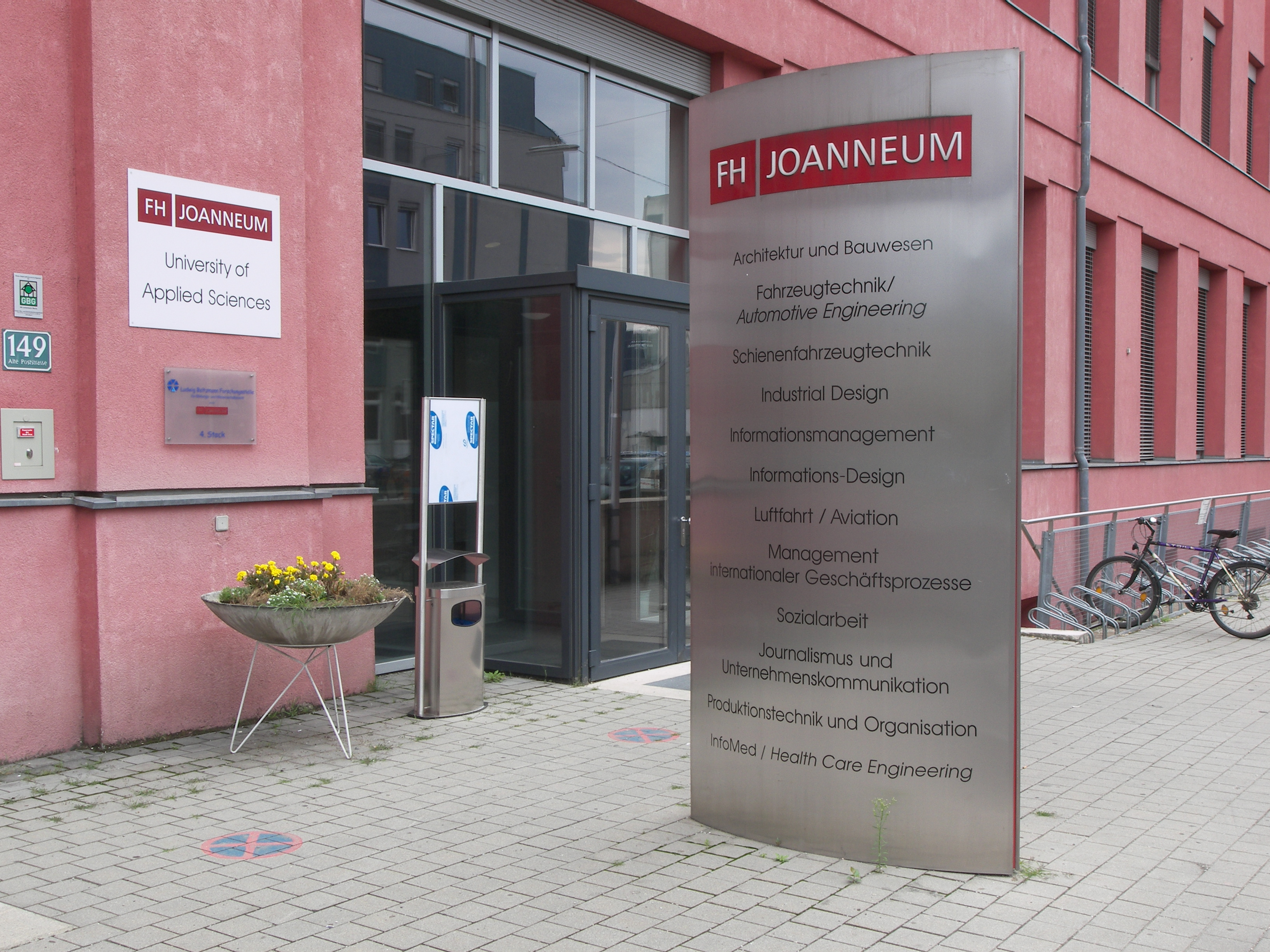
Main entrance Graz, Alte Poststrasse 149

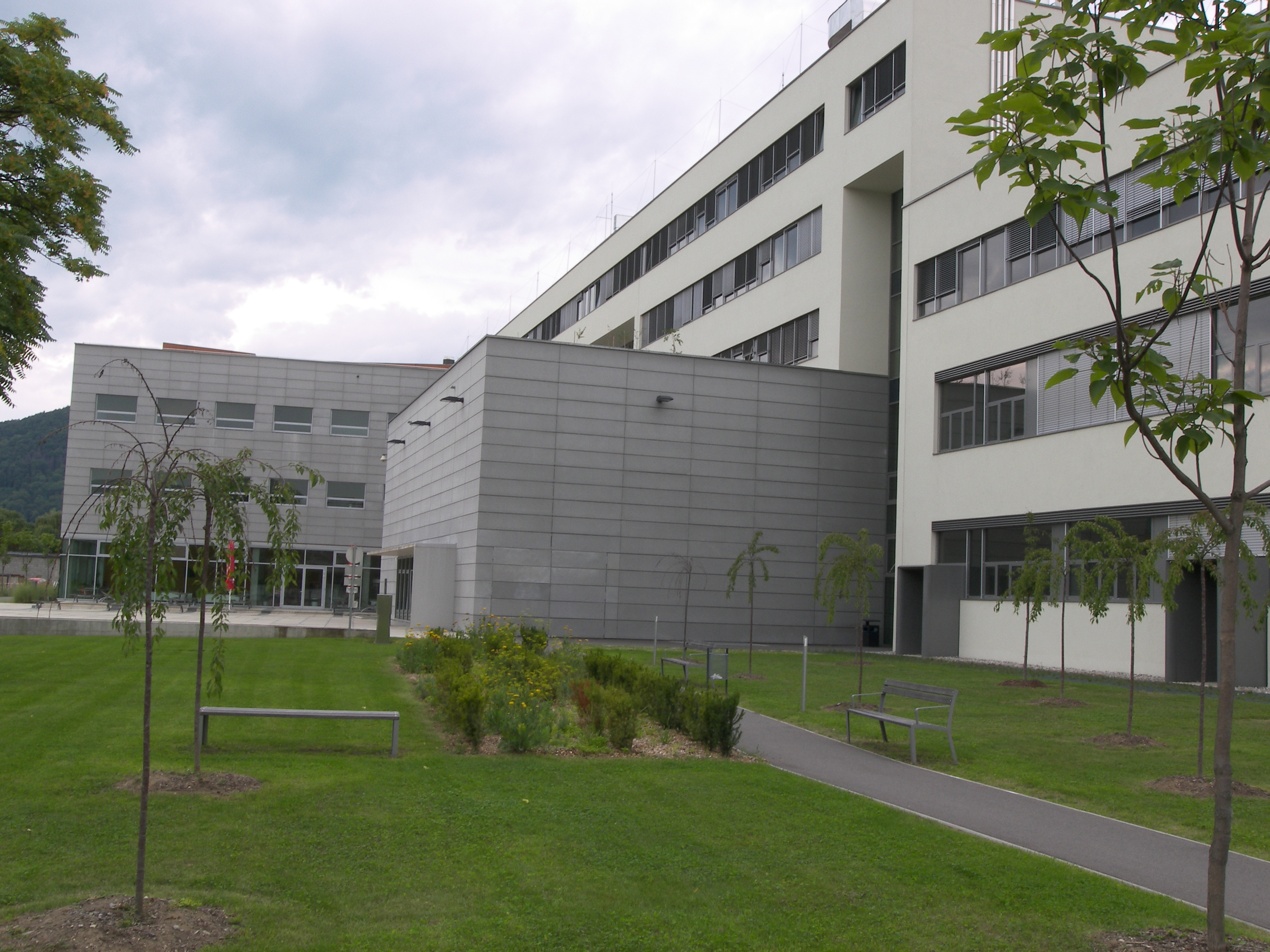
Campus building Graz, Eggenberger Allee 11

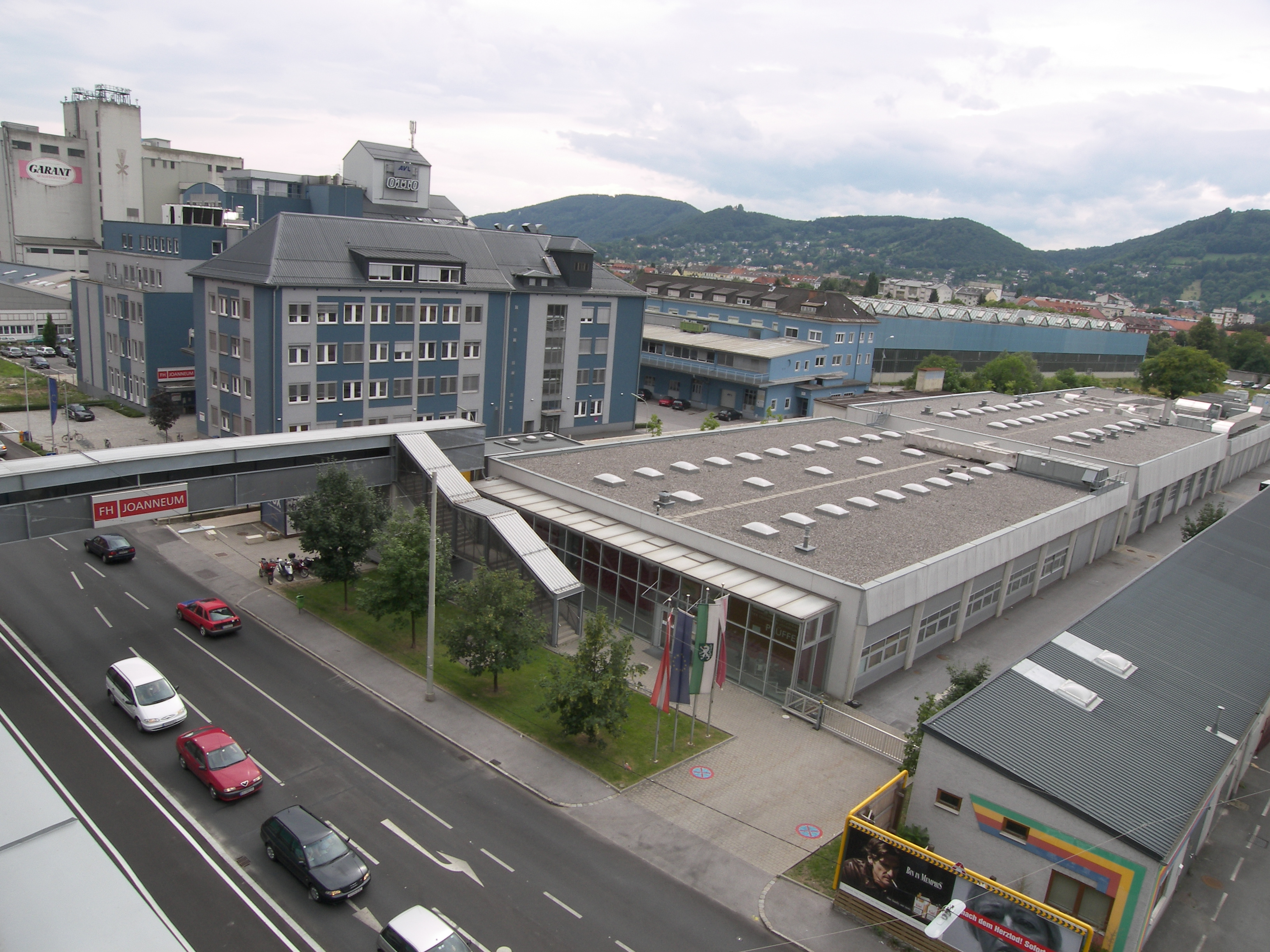
Automotive Engineering Labs, flat building, blue building to the left of it: Alte Poststrasse 154, Graz

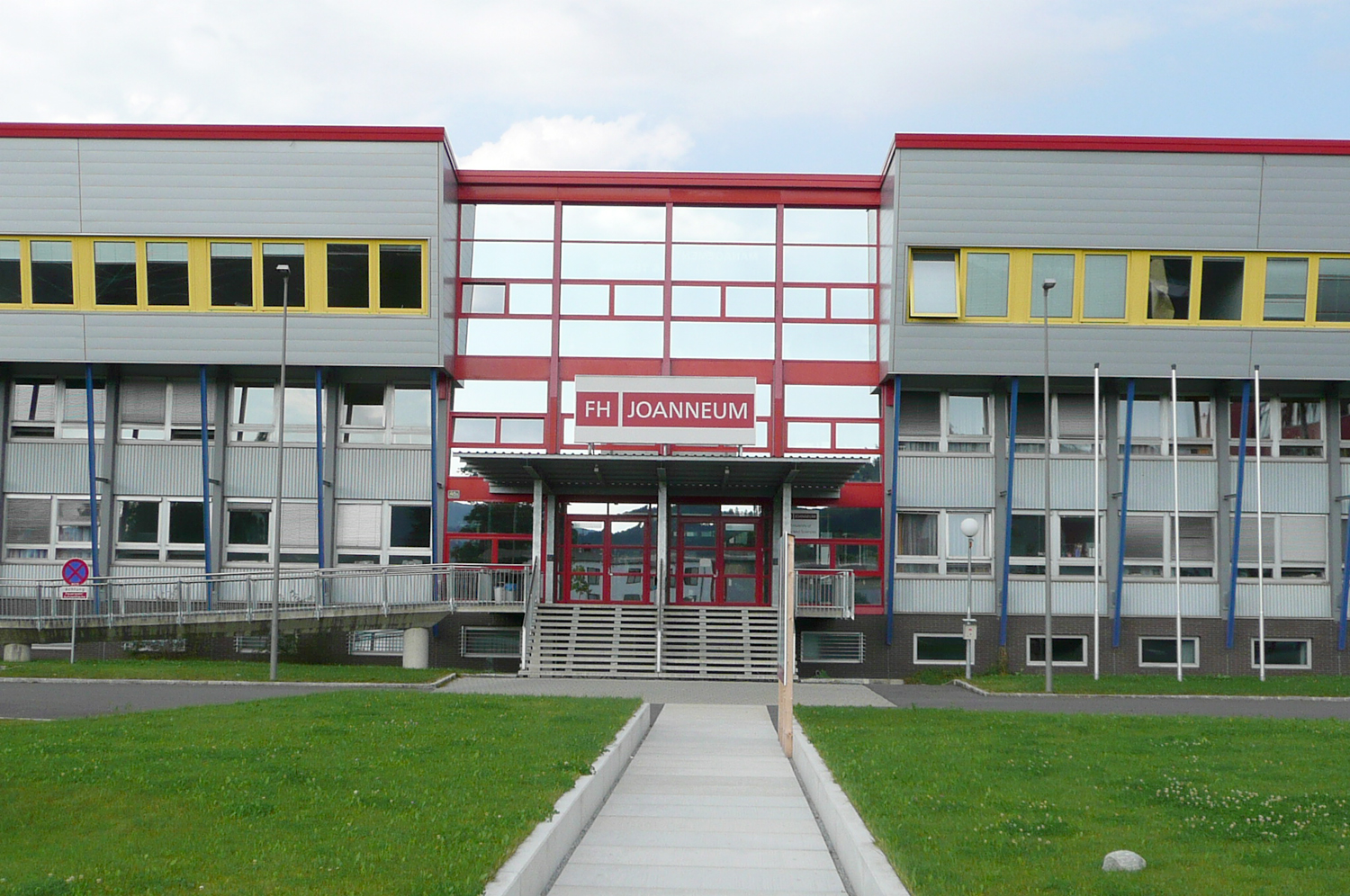
FH Joanneum building in Kapfenberg

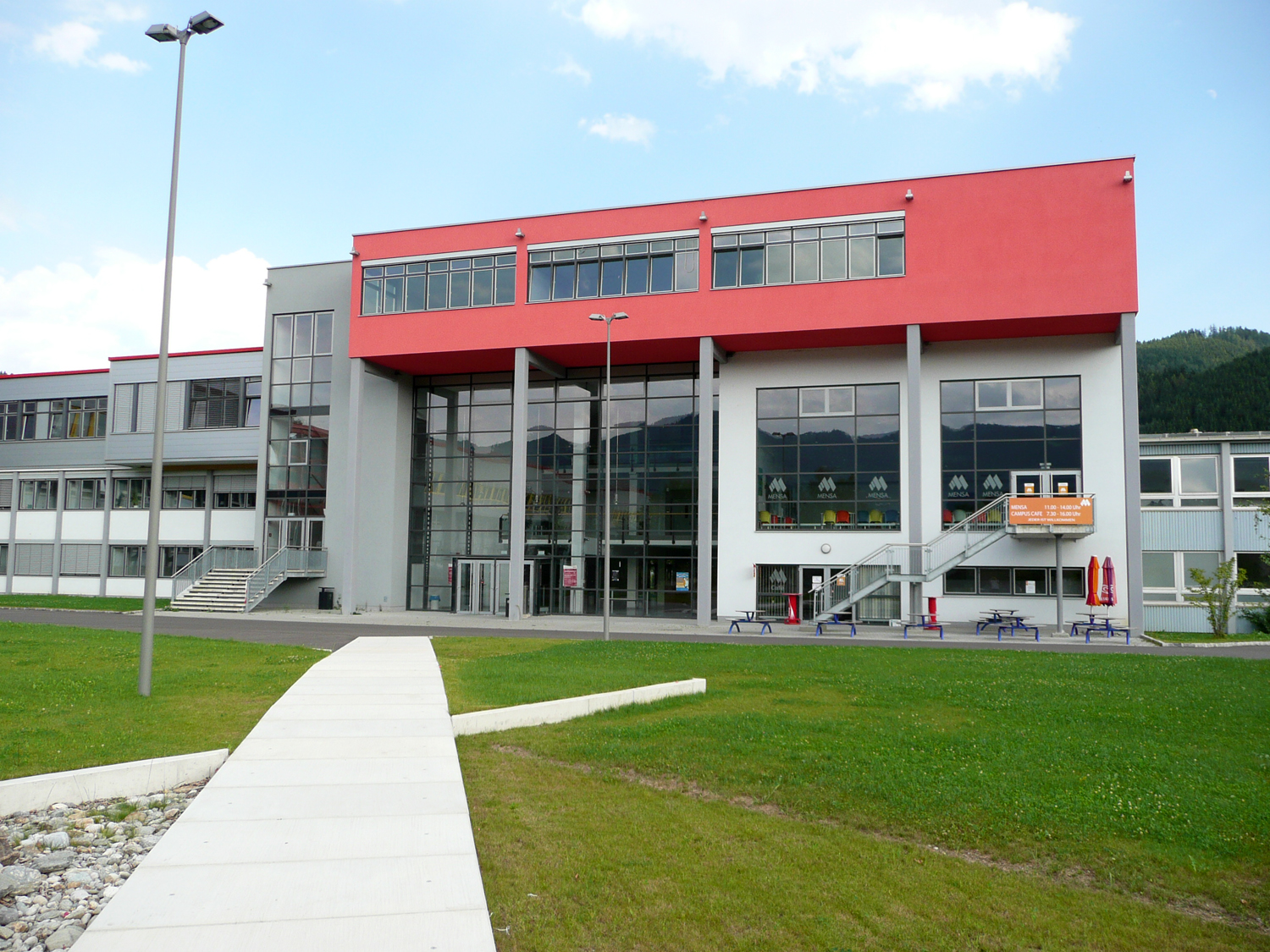
Refectory in Kapfenberg

== Departments/ programmes ==
FH Joanneum offers almost 70 bachelor's and master's degree programs and postgraduate courses at six departments and 26 institutes. The six departments are:

- Applied computer science
- Engineering
- Health studies
- Building, Energy & Society
- Media & Design
- Management

In addition to broad-based programs, there are courses with specialized focus, such as "Energy, Transport and Environmental Management", "eHealth" or "Advanced Electronic Engineering". Some new programs cover fields which have not yet been offered in Austria as university studies, for example, the midwifery education.

=== Projects ===
- One of the largest projects with students participation is the "joanneum racing team". Every year, the students in "Automotive Engineering", "Industrial Design", "Information Design", "Electronics & Technology Management", "Production Technology and Organisation", "Journalism & Public Relations" and "Physiotherapy" construct, build and commercialize a car. The project is based in the course "automotive engineering" and is supported by sponsors. The car is then taken to the "Formula Student" part and other Formula SAE competitions. The greatest successes are the overall win at the 2006 Formula SAE Italy and the 3rd overall rankings 2007 in Hockenheim and at the Formula Student UK 2008 at Silverstone.
- Another student project is the magazine "blank" and its companion web site that are created each year by students of "Journalism and PR".
- The participants of the courses "Luftfahrt / Aviation", "Information Design", "Industrial Design" and "Vehicle Technology" are also involved in projects in "Green Mobility". In practical projects they contribute new ideas and developments. They are supported by companies in the automotive industry. The development of a drone (UAVS) for civilian operations fall within the scope Green Mobility.

== Research ==
Department of Applied Computer Science	Department of Engineering	Department of Building, Energy and Society
Software Development and Digital Media Development	Power electronics in the field of energy systems and mobility	Resource saving urbanization; Building revitalization and building envelope
IT infrastructure architectures & IT Security	Civilian drones and aviation systems	Energy efficiency in industry, building and Local Area
Healthcare and computer science	Total vehicle technology in calculation and testing	Sustainable transport planning, pedestrian navigation

Department of Health Studies	Department of Media and Design	Department of Management
Diagnosis and Treatment	User Interface, data visualization, simulation	International strategies and business processes
Health promotion and prevention	Development of Product Design	Competitiveness in industry and finance
Activity and exercise	Content strategy, Web Literacy	Health promotion and (health) tourist programs

=== Training priorities, certifications and laboratories ===
- OS Education: MS IT Academy
- Electronic Design Center: Digital Short Range Radio, Embedded Systems, DSP
- Competence node telematics Kapfenberg
- Competence Center for Health Reporting
- Network Education: Cisco Networking Academy
- Seminars and workshops for managers (Summer Business School)
- Health Perception Lab (HPL) - Laboratory for Health and Sensors
- Entology Net: Force Lab - Showroom and explanation Forum for IT applications
- Perceptual laboratory VisionSpace: 3D visualization, technology-supported learning and human-computer interaction
- Metabolomics Laboratory: analysis methods in biomedical research
- Sports Science Laboratory "SpoWiLab"
- Laboratory of Avionics and ATC Technology
- Laboratory of Flight Simulation
- Laboratory of Physics and facade technology
- Laboratory for High-Frequency and Electromagnetic Compatibility
- Automotive Engineering test laboratory (accreditation body in accordance with ÖVE / ÖNORM EN ISO / IEC 17025)
- Streaming Studio: Web Radio Studio
- eGovernment Service Lab: Unlocks the Citizen Card and mobile signature
- Web Literacy Lab

== International ==
The Department of International Relations takes care of all exchange students from the university (for study or internship) going abroad (outgoings) and from abroad coming to the university (incomings). It acts as a contact point for partner universities. The department also organizes German courses (as a foreign language) and holds events and excursions.

FH Joanneum has approximately 200 partner universities in Europe, Asia, South America, North America and Australia / New Zealand.

== Student union ==
ÖH joanneum is the student union (ÖH) of FH Joanneum. It exists since the winter semester 2005/2006 and has since become an integrated part of the Teaching Board. By anchoring the FH student representatives in the Austrian Students' system, ÖH joanneum has become a legally established body. The activities of ÖH joanneum include representing the interests of FH JOANNEUM students at a higher level (e.g. As in the Federal Representation of Students' Union). Since autumn 2010 ÖH joanneum is also working on the magazine "JOE", educational issues and the organization of studies and the student life at home and abroad. The first edition was published in January 2011.
