= Maaria =

Former municipality in Turku and Pori Province, Finland

Maaria Maaria – S:t Marie
- Former municipality
- Maarian kunta S:t Marie kommun
- Coat of arms

- Location of Maaria in Finland (1960).
- Interactive map of Maaria
- Location within Southwest Finland Location within Finland Location within Europe
- Country: Finland
- Province: Turku and Pori
- Established: 1868
- Consolidated with Turku: 1967

Area
  - Land: 34.9 km^{2} (13.5 sq mi)

Population (1966-12-31)
  - Total: 3,076
  - Density: 88.1/km^{2} (228/sq mi)
- Time zone: UTC+02:00 (EET)
  - Summer (DST): UTC+03:00 (EEST)
- Official languages: Finnish

Maaria (S:t Marie in Swedish) is a former municipality of Finland in what is now the northern part of the city of Turku. The area has been inhabited since the Iron Age, and it became an important village in the 15th century with the construction of a church dedicated to the Virgin Mary (hence the district's name). Also Koroinen, with the former residence of the Bishop of Finland is in the area. The municipality of Maaria was founded in 1868, and it included the northern parts of modern Turku south of Paattinen, some enclaves to the north of Paattinen, and the island of Hirvensalo to the south of Turku.

In 1944, Hirvensalo, Raunistula and some other parts of the municipality were annexed into Turku, and the rest of the municipality followed suit in 1967. Since then, it has seen considerable growth. The Maaria Reservoir, which serves as an alternative source of tap water for Turku, was constructed in the area in 1982.

The area that used to be central Maaria is currently divided into the districts of Jäkärlä, Saramäki, Turku Airport and Yli-Maaria. The former municipality's name is preserved in administrative units such as the parish of Maaria, the district of Yli-Maaria and the ward of Maaria-Paattinen, which includes the five northern districts of Turku.
