= Vähäheikkilä =

District of Turku, Finland

Coordinates: 60°25′55″N 22°15′30″E

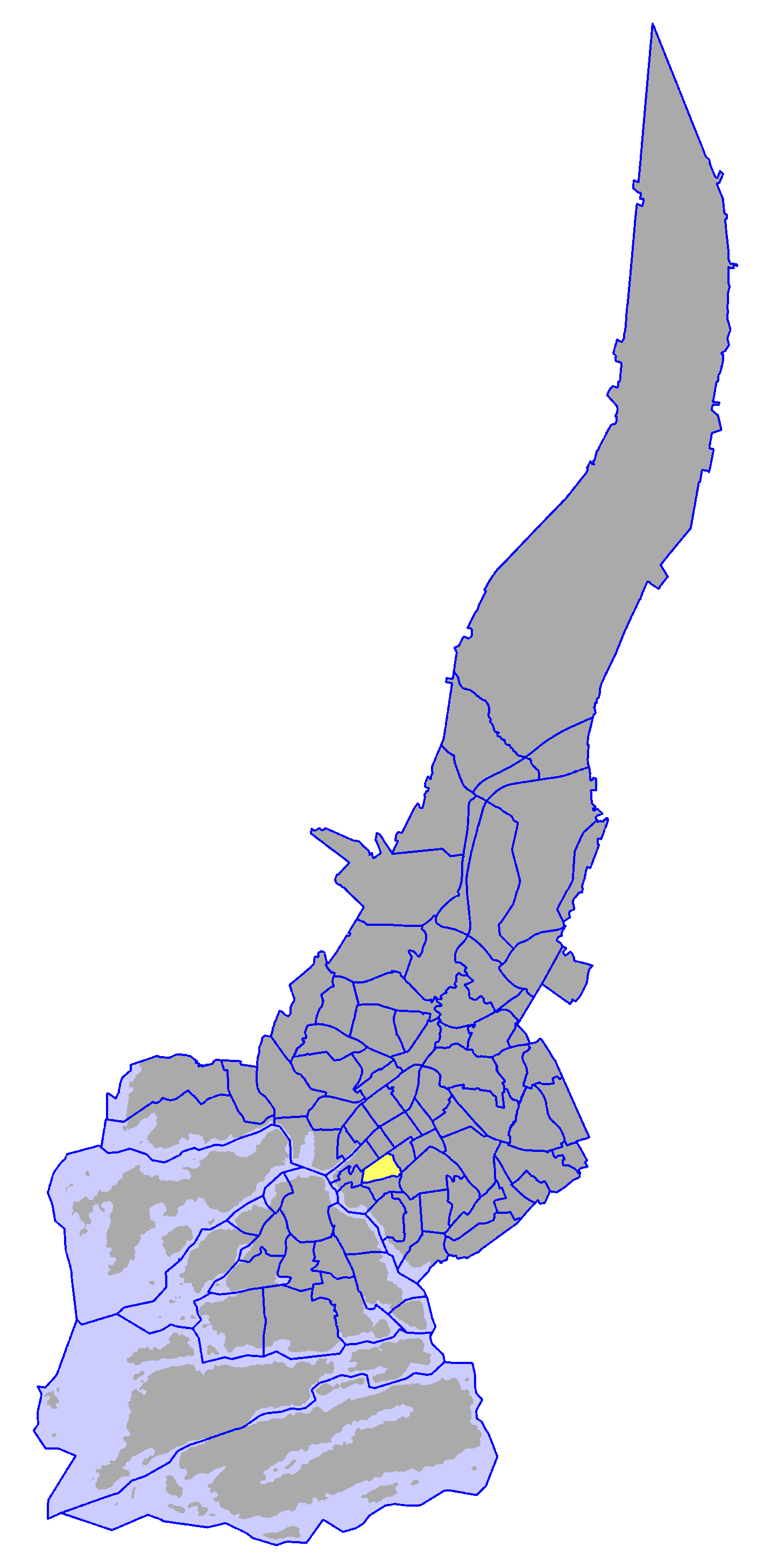
Vähäheikkilä on a map of Turku.

Vähäheikkilä (Finnish; Lillheikkilä in Swedish) is a district of the city of Turku, in Finland. It is located to the south of the city centre, between Martti and Puistomäki. Despite the district's name it has nothing to do with Iso-Heikkilä, which is located on the other side of the city centre.

The current (as of 2004) population of Vähäheikkilä is 1,153, and it is decreasing at an annual rate of 3.90%. 18.82% of the district's population are under 15 years old, while 15.00% are over 65. The district's linguistic makeup is 91.41% Finnish, 6.50% Swedish, and 2.08% other.

The buildings in the area are mainly wooden houses and detached houses built in the early 1900s. In the western part of Puistomäki, there are also veterans' houses that were built for soldiers and their families after the Second World War. Nestled in the area are also a few apartment buildings and small industries.

== Local Organisation ==
There is an influential and active neighborhood association, Martinrantaseura, operating in Vähäheikkilä. From Martinrantaseura's magazines you can read the history of the area and get to know its social activities. The neighborhood association for Puistomäki is Meripuistoseura ry, which aims to promote communality, recreational opportunities and historical knowledge in the area as well as represent residents views in city planning.

== See also ==
- Districts of Turku
- Districts of Turku by population
