= Ispoinen =

City district in Turku, Finland

Coordinates: 60°25′15″N 22°16′20″E

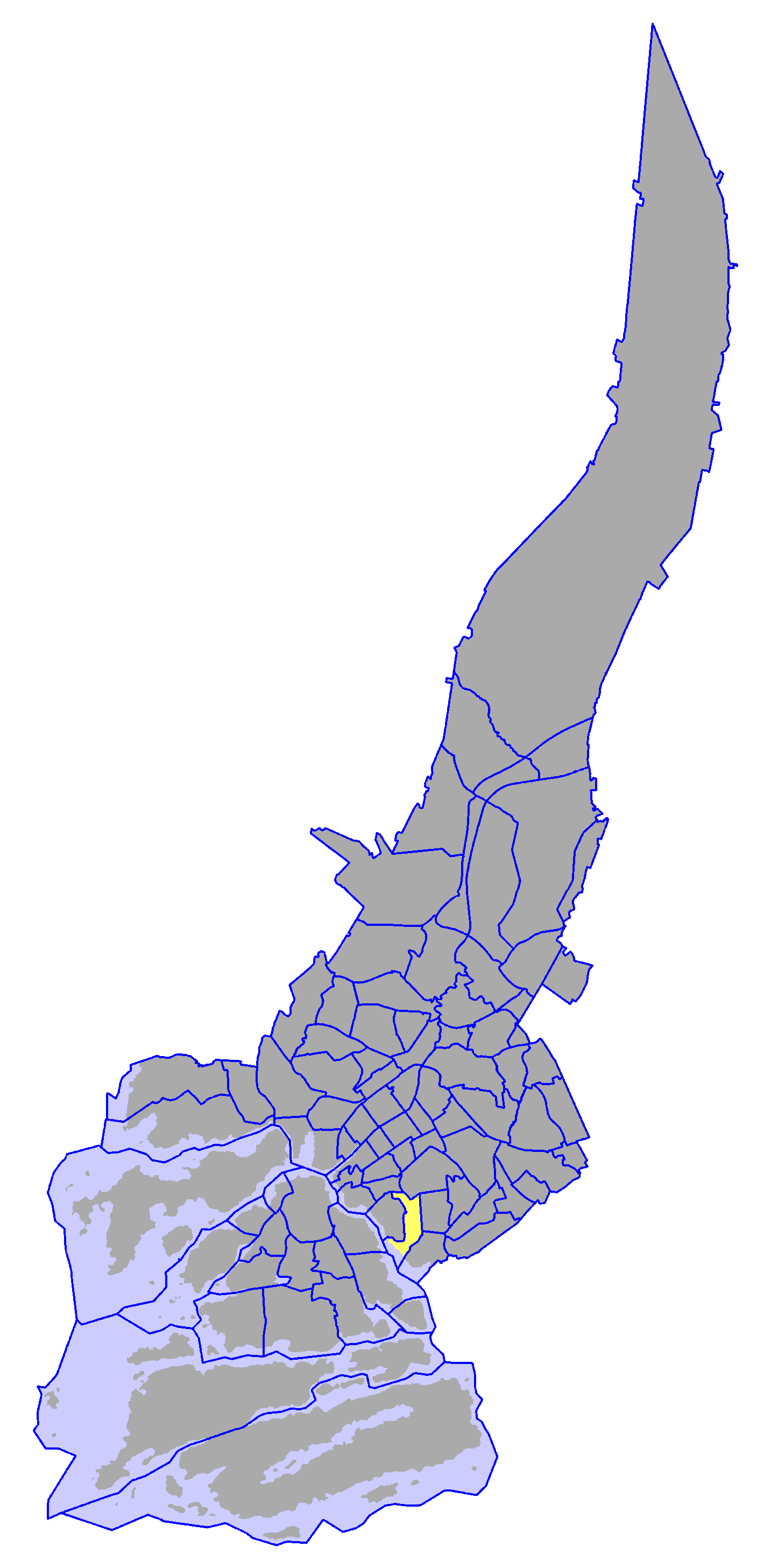
Ispoinen on a map of Turku.

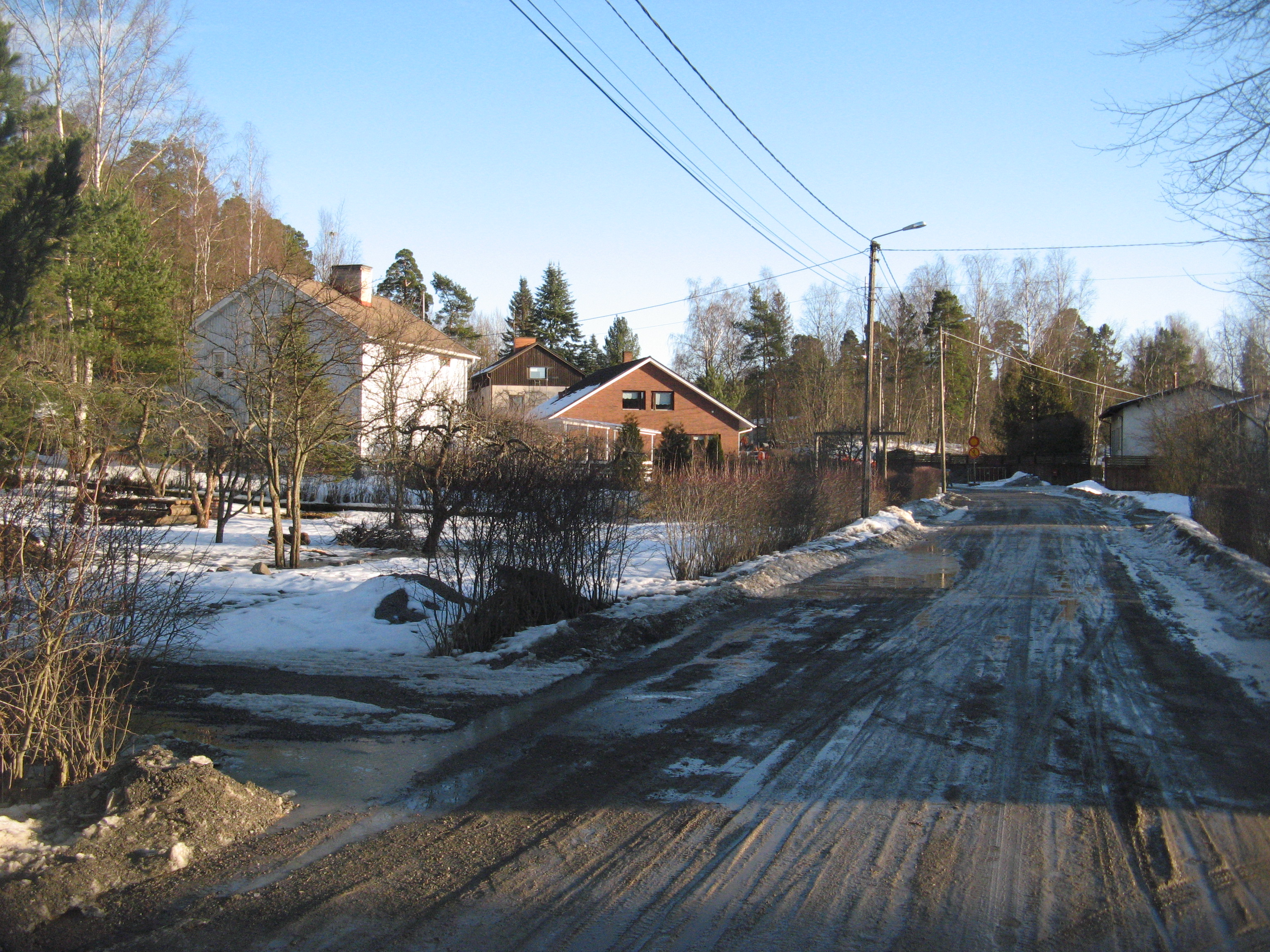
Linnunpääntie in Ispoinen

Ispoinen (Ispois in Swedish) is a district in the Uittamo-Skanssi ward of the city of Turku, in Finland. It is located in the southeast of the city, and is mainly a low-density residential area between the more densely built Uittamo and Ilpoinen.

The current (as of 2015) population of Ispoinen is 443, and it is increasing at an annual rate of 0.99%. 15.58% of the district's population are under 15 years old, while 18.96% are over 65. The district's linguistic makeup is 91.88% Finnish, 7.71% Swedish, and 0.42% other.

== See also ==
- Districts of Turku
- Districts of Turku by population
