= Vatti (disambiguation) =

Vatti may refer to:

- Vatti, Chinese kitchen appliances manufacturer
- Vätti, a district of the city of Turku, in Finland.
- Vatti clipping algorithm, a computer graphics algorithm used in clipping arbitrary polygons
