= Vaala, Turku =

District of Turku, Finland

Coordinates: 60°26′10″N 22°21′45″E

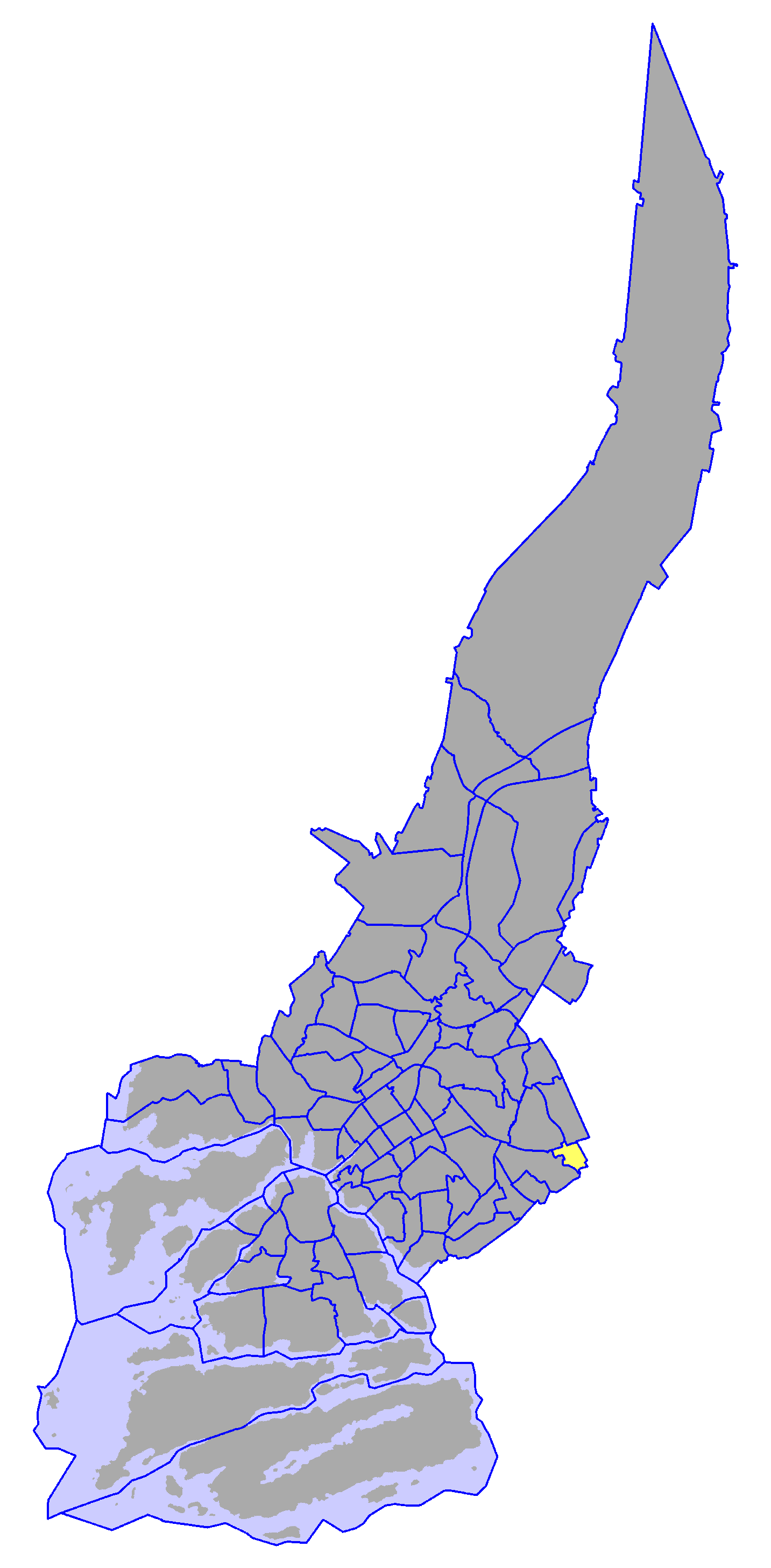
Vaala on a map of Turku.

Vaala (Finnish; Svalas in Swedish) is a district in the Itäharju-Varissuo ward of the city of Turku, in Finland. It is located to the east of the city centre, and consists mainly of a strip of low-density residential area between the more densely built suburbs of Varissuo and Lauste.

As of 2004, the population of Vaala is 972, and it is decreasing at an annual rate of 0.62%. 30.35% of the district's population are under 15 years old, while 4.22% are over 65. The district's linguistic makeup is 85.29% Finnish, 2.47% Swedish, and 12.24% other.

== See also ==
- Districts of Turku
- Districts of Turku by population
