= Oriketo =

District of Turku, Finland

Coordinates: 60.481°N 22.319°E

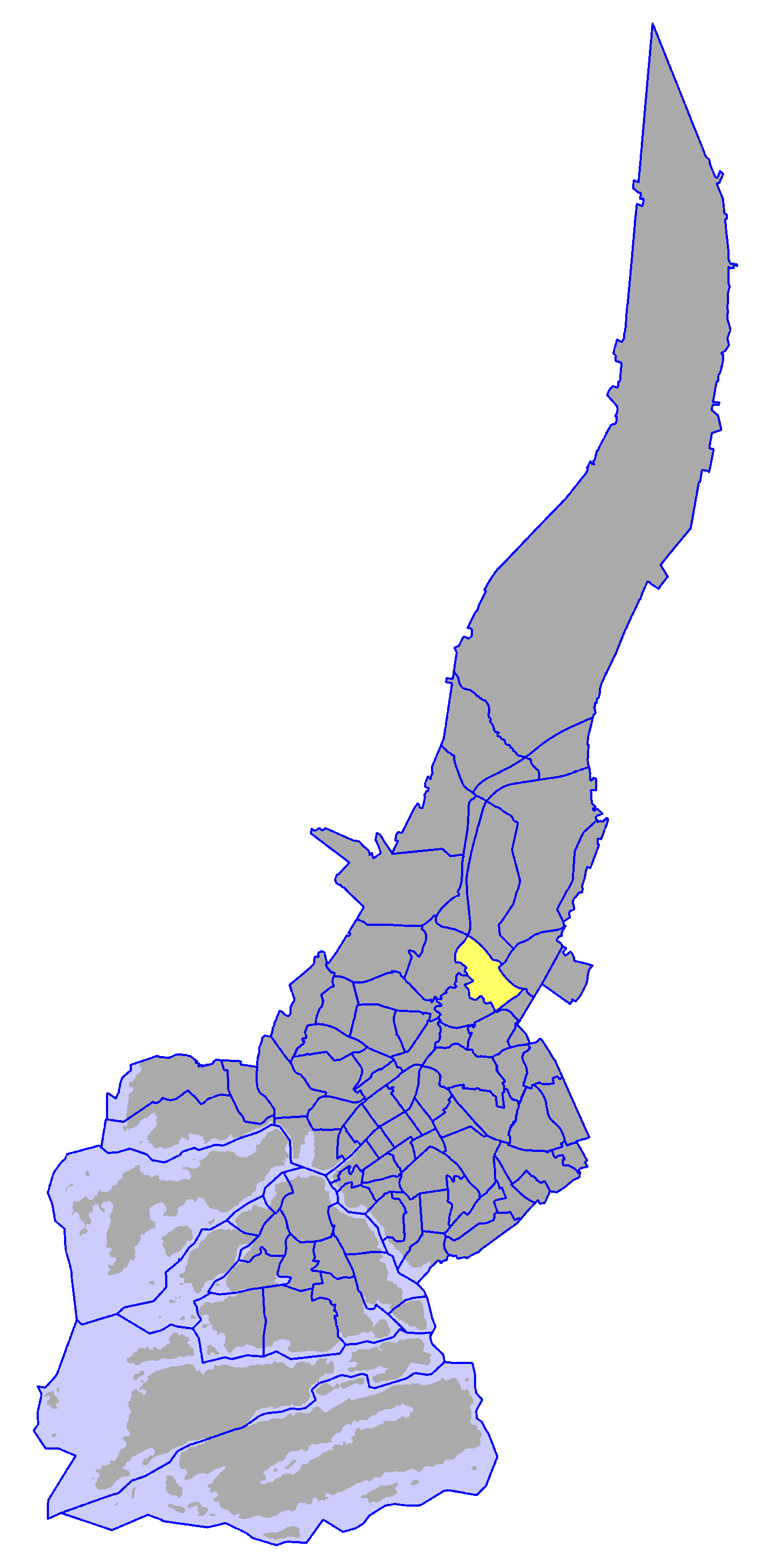
Oriketo on a map of Turku

Oriketo is a district in the Koroinen ward of the city of Turku, in Finland. It is located to the north of the densely built suburb of Halinen, and consists mostly of industrial area. Turku's waste processing plant is located in Oriketo, despite the staunch opposition of the residents of Räntämäki, another residential suburb located nearby.

The current (as of 2004) population of Oriketo is 120, and it is increasing at an annual rate of 5.83%. 11.67% of the district's population are under 15 years old, while 9.17% are over 65. The district's linguistic makeup is 89.17% Finnish, 0.83% Swedish, and 10.00% other.

== See also ==
- Districts of Turku
- Districts of Turku by population
