= Subdivisions of Turku =

The city of Turku, Finland is divided into nine wards (suuralueet in Finnish, storområden in Swedish) and into 87 non-governmental districts (kaupunginosat in Finnish, stadsdelar in Swedish). These are composed of individual suburbs, and in the very centre of the city, sectors of the central business district are identified by Roman numerals. The ward division does not always follow district boundaries.

In the following list, the names are given first in Finnish, and then in Swedish (if applicable) in brackets. For districts that have an English name, it is given first with other languages following. When a district is divided between two or three wards, it is listed under each and this is indicated by a footnote.

== City Centre (Ward 1) ==
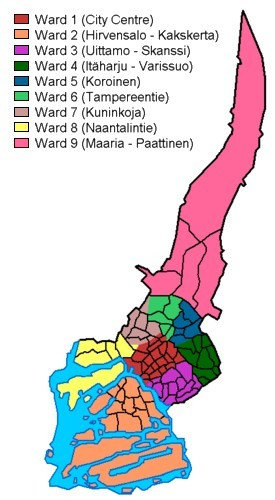
The wards of Turku in 2005

- I District
- II District
- III District
- IV District - Martti (Martins)
- V District - Itäranta (Öststranden)
- VI District
- VII District
- VIII District - Port Arthur
- IX District - Länsiranta (Väststranden)
- Iso-Heikkilä (Storheikkilä)
- Korppolaismäki (Korppolaisbacken)
- Kupittaa (Kuppis)
- Kurjenmäki (Tranbacken)
- Kähäri^{1}
- Mäntymäki (Tallbacka)
- Pihlajaniemi (Rönnudden)^{2}
- Pitkämäki^{3} (Långbacka)
- Pohjola (Norrstan)
- Port of Turku (Turun satama/Åbo hamn)
- Raunistula^{4}
- Vähäheikkilä (Lillheikkilä)
- Vätti^{1}

== Hirvensalo-Kakskerta (Ward 2) ==
- Friskala
- Haarla (Harlax)
- Illoinen (Illois)
- Jänessaari
- Kaistarniemi (Kaistarudden)
- Kakskerta
- Kukola
- Lauttaranta (Färjstranden)
- Maanpää
- Moikoinen (Moikois)
- Oriniemi
- Papinsaari
- Pikisaari (Beckholmen)
- Satava
- Särkilahti
- Toijainen (Toijais)

== Uittamo-Skanssi (Ward 3) ==
- Harittu
- Ilpoinen (Ilpois)
- Ispoinen (Ispois)
- Katariina (Katarina)
- Koivula (Björkas)
- Luolavuori
- Peltola
- Pihlajaniemi (Rönnudden)^{2}
- Puistomäki (Parkbacken)
- Skanssi (Skansen)
- Uittamo
- Vasaramäki (Hammarbacka)

== Itäharju-Varissuo (Ward 4) ==
- Huhkola
- Itäharju (Österås)
- Kohmo
- Kurala
- Lauste (Laustis)
- Nummi^{5} (Nummis)
- Pääskyvuori (Svalberga)
- Vaala (Svalas)
- Varissuo (Kråkkärret)

== Koroinen (Ward 5) ==
- Koroinen (Korois)
- Halinen (Hallis)
- Nummi^{5} (Nummis)
- Oriketo
- Räntämäki

== Tampereentie (Ward 6) ==
The ward is named after the major route that passes through the ward in the direction of Tampere.

- Kaerla
- Kastu
- Kärsämäki
- Raunistula^{4}
- Runosmäki^{6} (Runosbacken)

== Kuninkoja (Ward 7) ==
The ward is named after the historical area of the city that it occupies. There is also a district called Kuninkoja in the neighbouring municipality of Raisio.

- Kähäri^{1}
- Mälikkälä
- Pitkämäki^{3} (Långbacka)
- Runosmäki^{6} (Runosbacken)
- Ruohonpää
- Teräsrautela
- Vätti^{1}

== Naantalintie (Ward 8) ==
The ward is named after the major route that passes through the ward in the direction of Naantali.

- Artukainen (Artukais)
- Pahaniemi
- Pansio
- Perno
- Pitkämäki^{3} (Långbacka)
- Ruissalo (Runsala)

== Maaria-Paattinen (Ward 9) ==
The ward is named after Maaria and Paattinen, the two former municipalities from which it was formed after both of them were annexed into Turku.

- Turku Airport (Turun lentoasema/Åbo flygstation)
- Jäkärlä
- Paattinen (Patis)
- Saramäki (Starrbacka)
- Yli-Maaria (Övre S:t Marie)

== Notes ==
- ^1 The districts of Kähäri and Vätti are divided between City Centre and Kuninkoja.
- ^2 The district of Pihlajaniemi is divided between City Centre and Uittamo-Skanssi.
- ^3 The district of Pitkämäki is divided between City Centre, Kuninkoja and Naantalintie.
- ^4 The district of Raunistula is divided between City Centre and Tampereentie.
- ^5 The district of Nummi is divided between Itäharju-Varissuo and Koroinen.
- ^6 The district of Runosmäki is divided between Tampereentie and Kuninkoja.

== See also ==
- Districts of Turku by population
