= Kurala =

Coordinates: 60°27′40″N 22°19′40″E

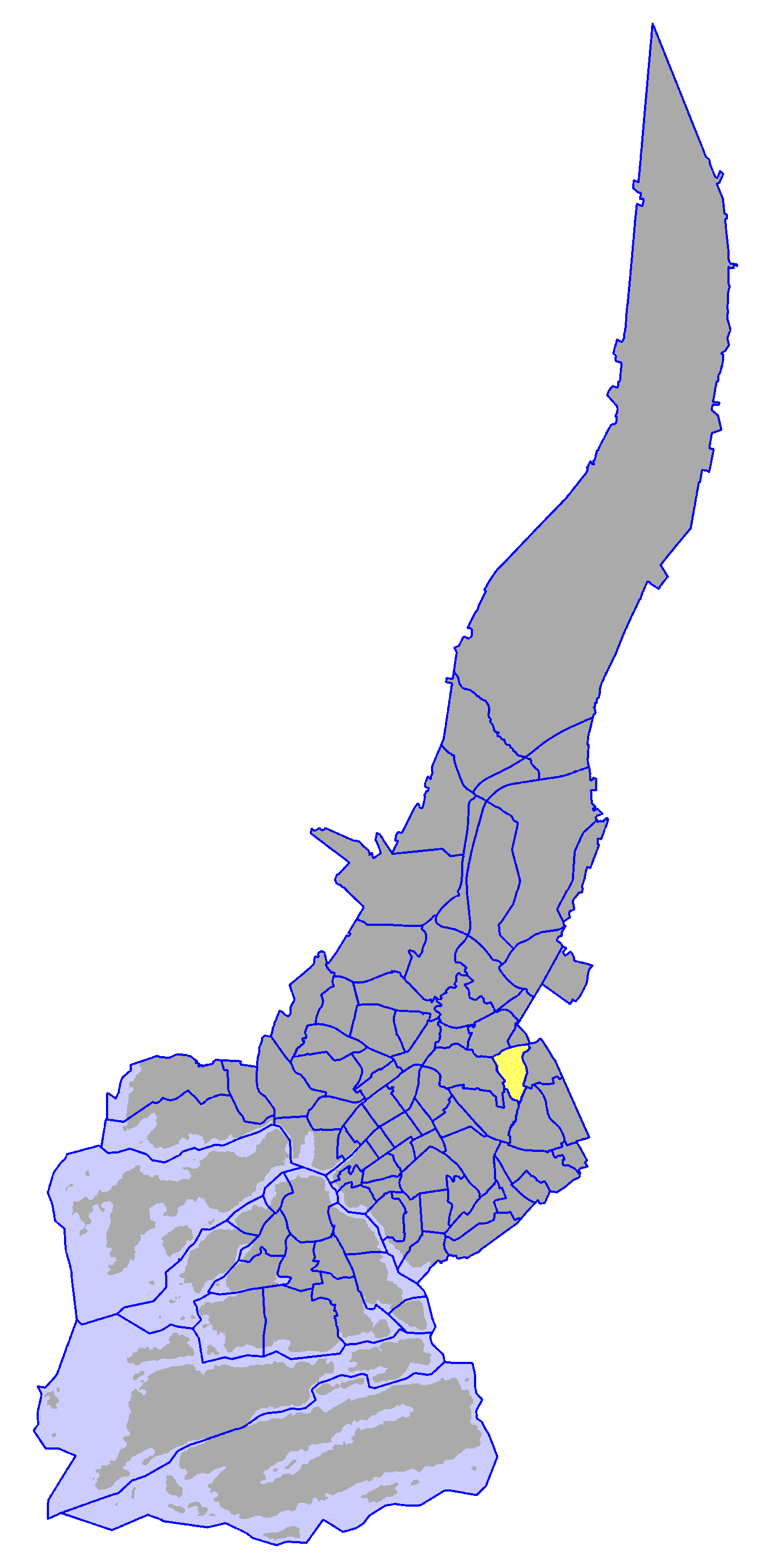
Kurala on a map of Turku.

Kurala is a district in the Itäharju-Varissuo ward of the city of Turku, in Finland. It is located to the northeast of the city, and is largely a low-density residential suburb.

The current (as of 2004) population of Kurala is 2,956, and it is decreasing at an annual rate of 1.25%. 13.26% of the district's population are under 15 years old, while 25.37% are over 65. The district's linguistic makeup is 93.78% Finnish, 4.30% Swedish, and 1.93% other.

== See also ==
- Districts of Turku
- Districts of Turku by population
