= Kaerla =

Coordinates: 60°28′55″N 22°16′20″E

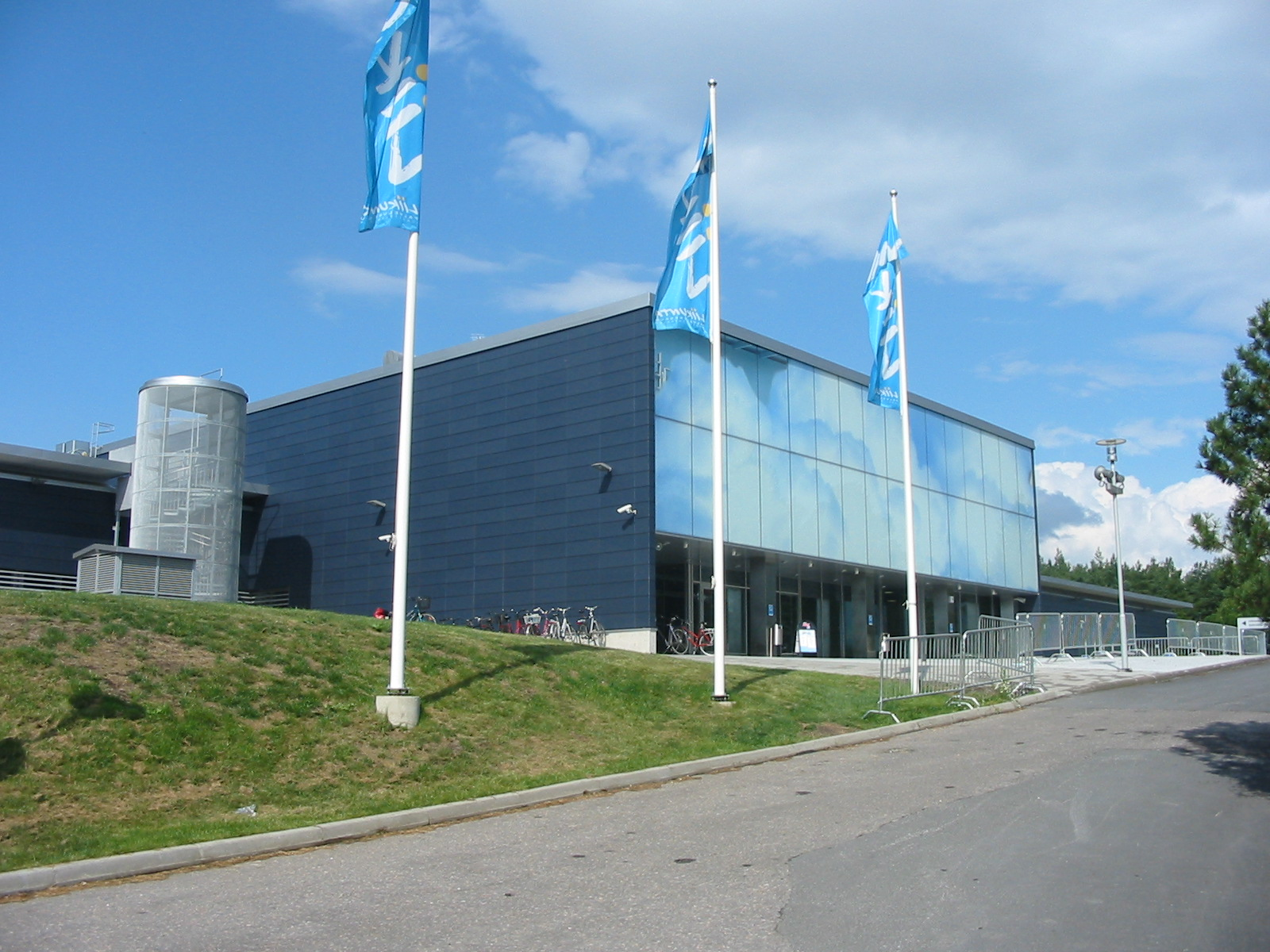
- Interactive map of Kaerla

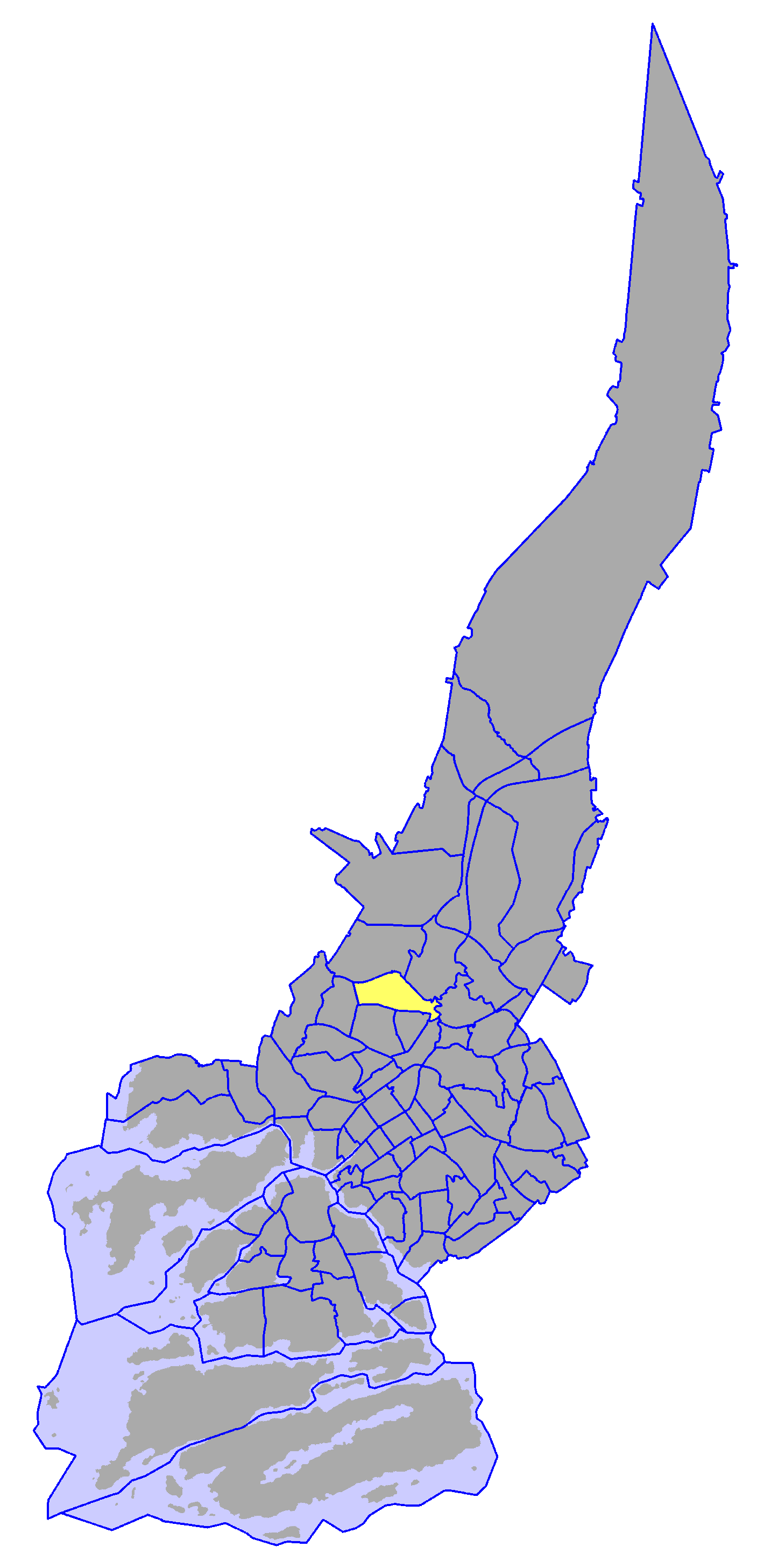
Kaerla on a map of Turku.

Kaerla is a district in the Tampereentie ward of the city of Turku, in Finland.It is located to the north of the city centre, next to the densely built suburb of Runosmäki. Kaerla is mostly low-density residential area, but it also includes the area of Impivaara, with numerous sports and recreational facilities such as an ice hockey arena, an indoor football venue, the city's main swimming centre, as well as a tennis centre.

The current (as of 2004) population of Kaerla is 2,182, and it is decreasing at an annual rate of 1.47%. 16.50% of the district's population are under 15 years old, while 17.74% are over 65. The district's linguistic makeup is 94.96% Finnish, 2.11% Swedish, and 2.93% other.

== See also ==
- Districts of Turku
- Districts of Turku by population
