= Pitkämäki =

City district in Turku, Finland

Coordinates: 60°27′33″N 22°13′41″E

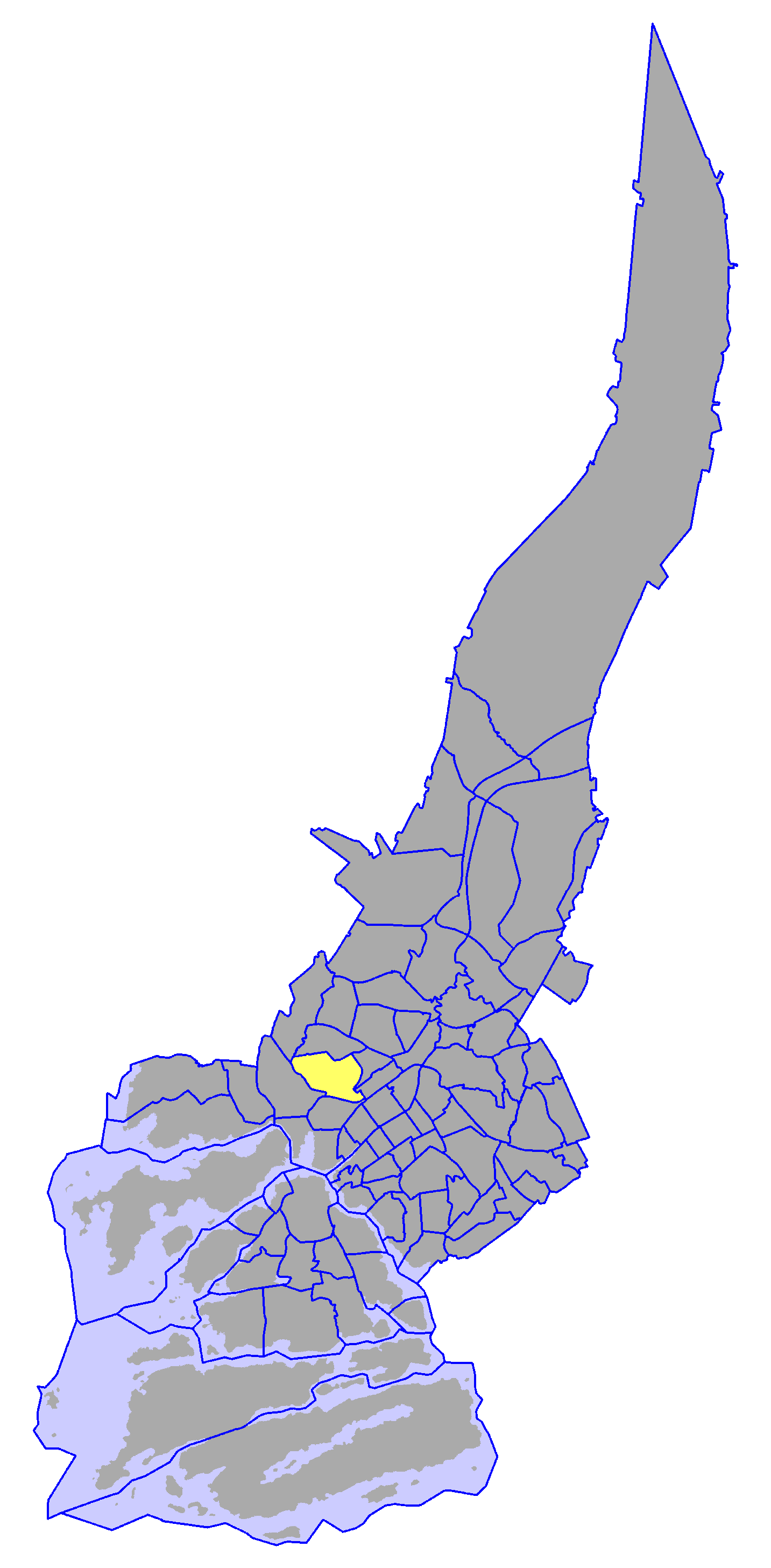
Pitkämäki on a map of Turku

Pitkämäki (Finnish; Långbacka in Swedish) is a district of the city of Turku, in Finland. It is located in the southwestern part of the city, and consists of several residential suburbs and an industrial area. Pitkämäki is the only district in Turku to be divided among three different wards: the industrial area belongs to the City Centre ward, the high-density residential area of Suikkila to Kuninkoja, and the low-density residential area of Muhkuri to Naantalintie.

The current (as of 2004) population of Pitkämäki is 2,886, and it is decreasing at an annual rate of 0.28%. 13.17% of the district's population are under 15 years old, while 23.11% are over 65. The district's linguistic makeup is 93.66% Finnish, 5.02% Swedish, and 1.32% other.

== See also ==
- Districts of Turku
- Districts of Turku by population
