= Teräsrautela =

District of Turku, Finland

Coordinates: 60°28′42″N 22°14′30″E

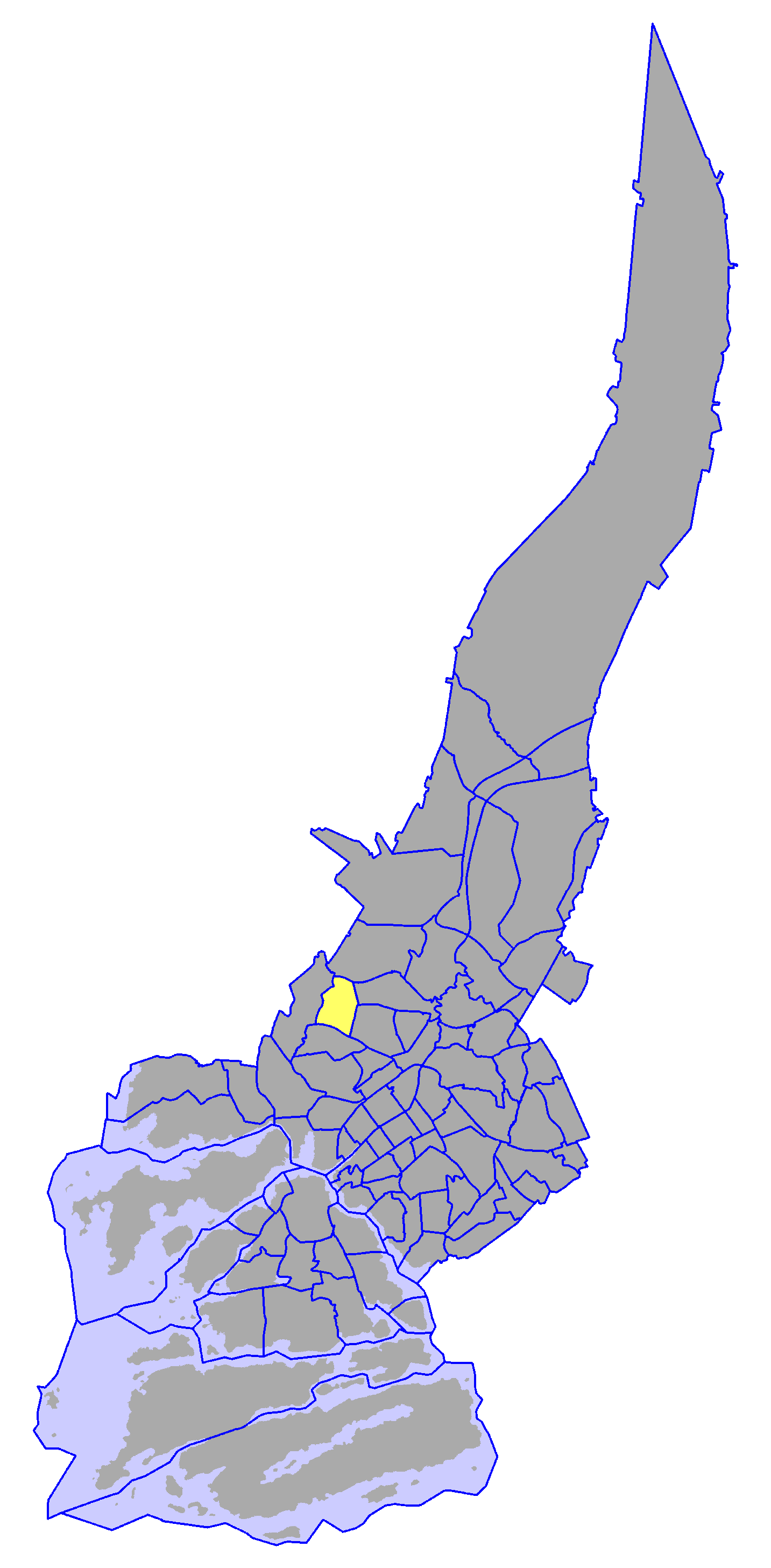
Teräsrautela on a map of Turku.

Teräsrautela is a district in the Kuninkoja ward of the city of Turku, in Finland. It is located to the west of the city, and is mainly a high-density residential suburb. The large Länsikeskus shopping centre is located in Teräsrautela.

The current (as of 2004) population of Teräsrautela is 3,554, and it is increasing at an annual rate of 0.37%. 11.73% of the district's population are under 15 years old, while 20.17% are over 65. The district's linguistic makeup is 96.57% Finnish, 2.42% Swedish, and 1.01% other.

== See also ==
- Districts of Turku
- Districts of Turku by population
