= Peltola, Turku =

District in Finland

Coordinates: 60°25′30″N 22°18′0″E

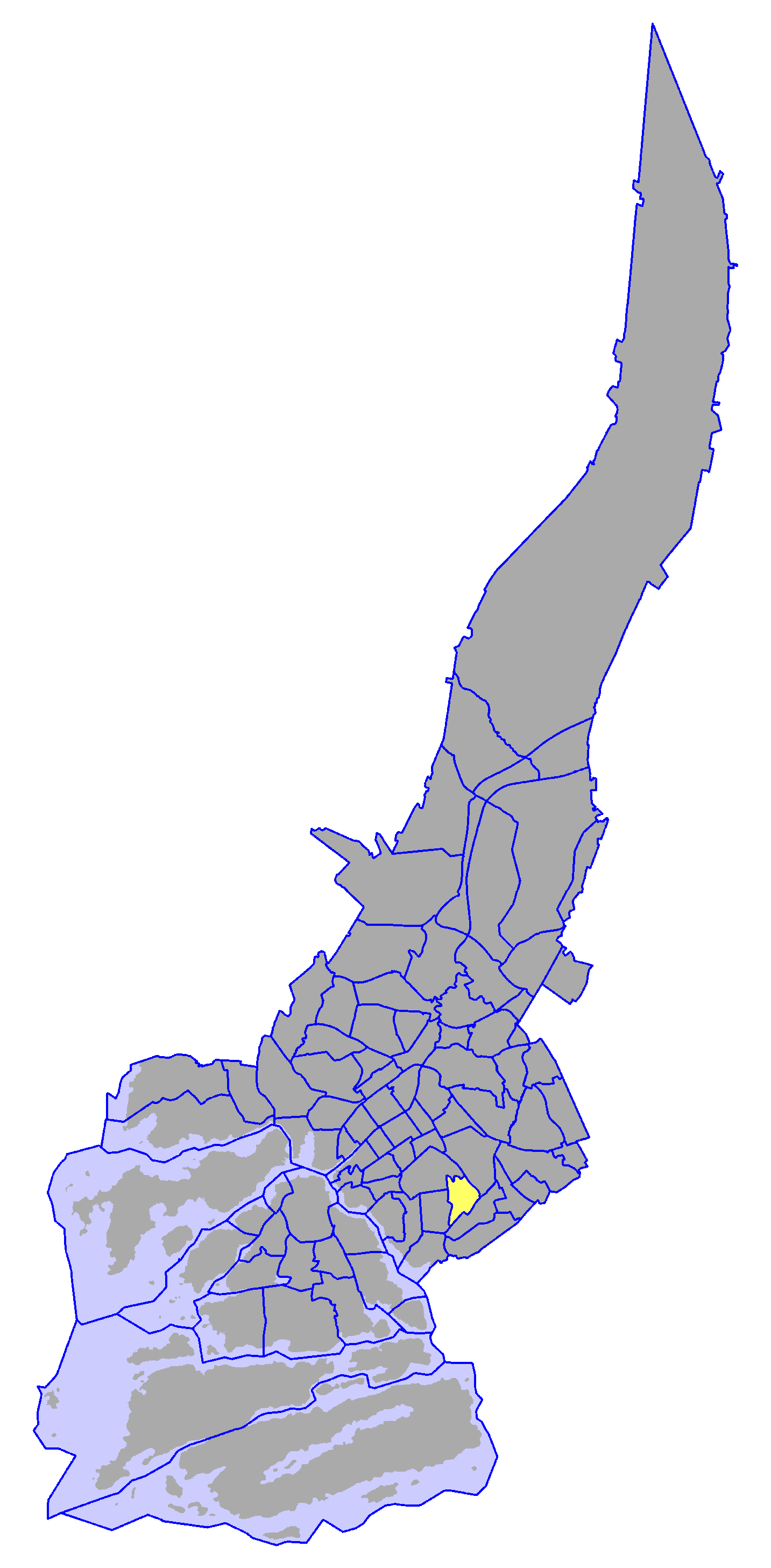
Peltola on a map of Turku.

Peltola is a district in the Uittamo-Skanssi ward of the city of Turku, in Finland. It is located in the southeast of the city, and consists mostly of industrial area. There is also a vocational school in Peltola, and many people refer to it simply as 'Peltola'.

The population of Peltola was 778 in 2006, at which time it was believed to be decreasing at an annual rate of 0.77%. In 2016 the population was 736. 14.27% of the district's population are under 15 years old, while 23.78% are over 65. The district's linguistic makeup is 91.65% Finnish, 7.58% Swedish, and 0.77% other.

== See also ==
- Districts of Turku
- Districts of Turku by population
