= V District, Turku =

City district in Turku, Finland

Coordinates: 60°26′11″N 22°14′41″E

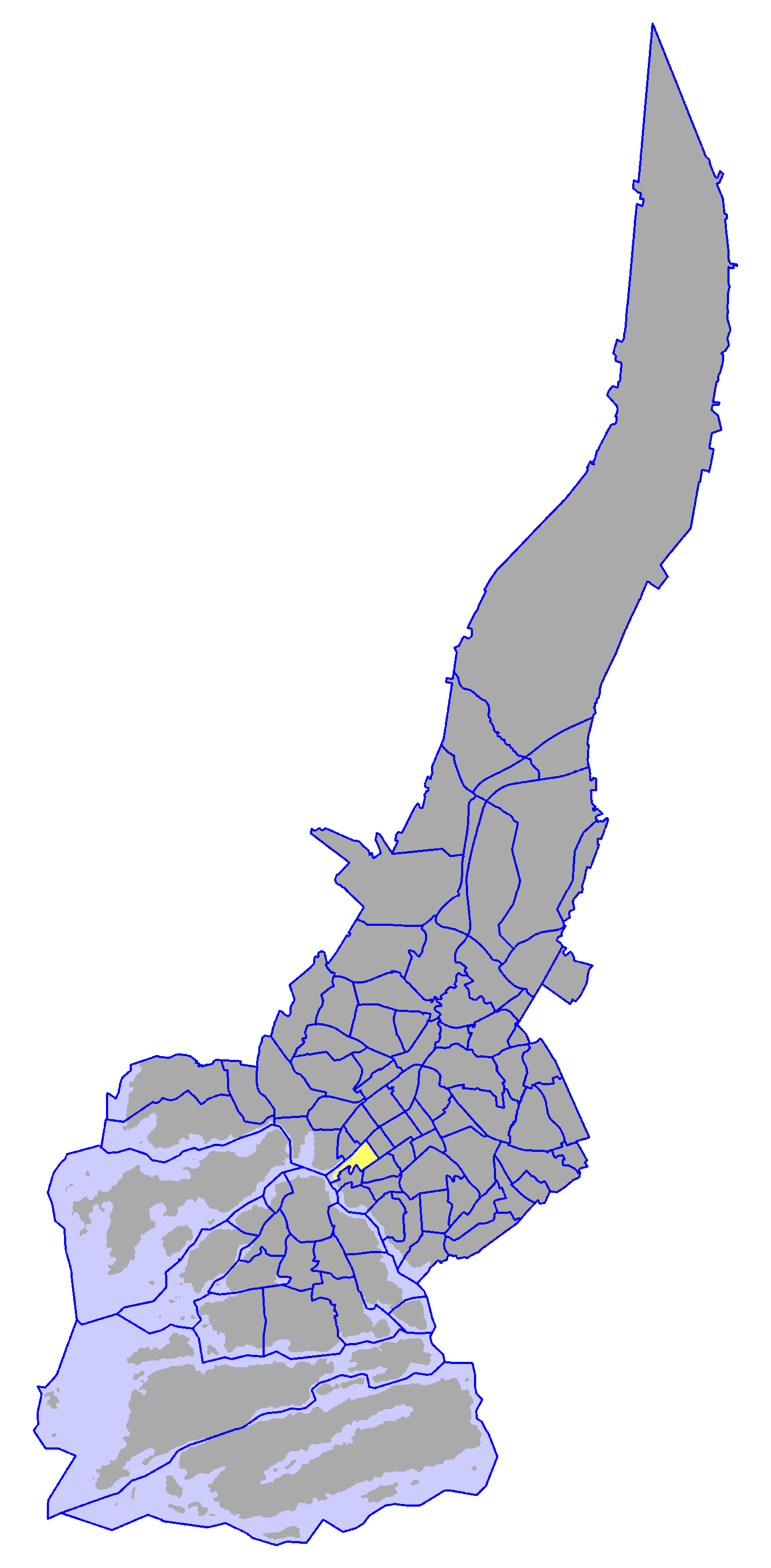
The V District on a map of Turku.

The V District, also known as Itäranta (Finnish; Öststranden in Swedish, meaning 'east bank'), is one of the central districts of Turku, Finland. As its name suggests, it is located on the east side of the river Aura, and stretches from the IV District (Martti) all the way to the mouth of the river. The district is strongly associated with the sea - it neighbours the Port of Turku across the river, and its street names have a ship-related theme.

The district has a population of 3,677 (as of 2004) and an annual population growth rate of -1.25%. 13.41% of the district's population are under 15 years old, while 10.31% are over 65. The district's linguistic makeup is 90.02% Finnish, 5.17% Swedish, and 4.81% other.

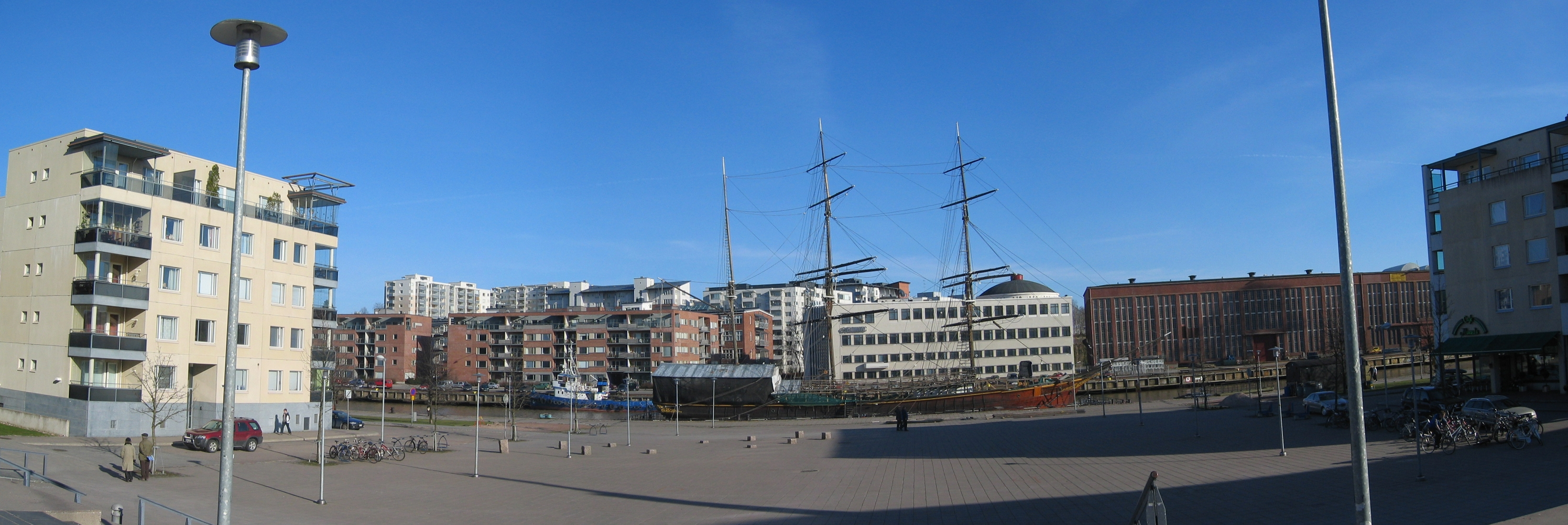
Itäranta seen from Varvintori, Länsiranta

== See also ==
- Districts of Turku
- Districts of Turku by population
