= Vasaramäki =

District of Turku, Finland

Coordinates: 60°26′18″N 022°18′11″E

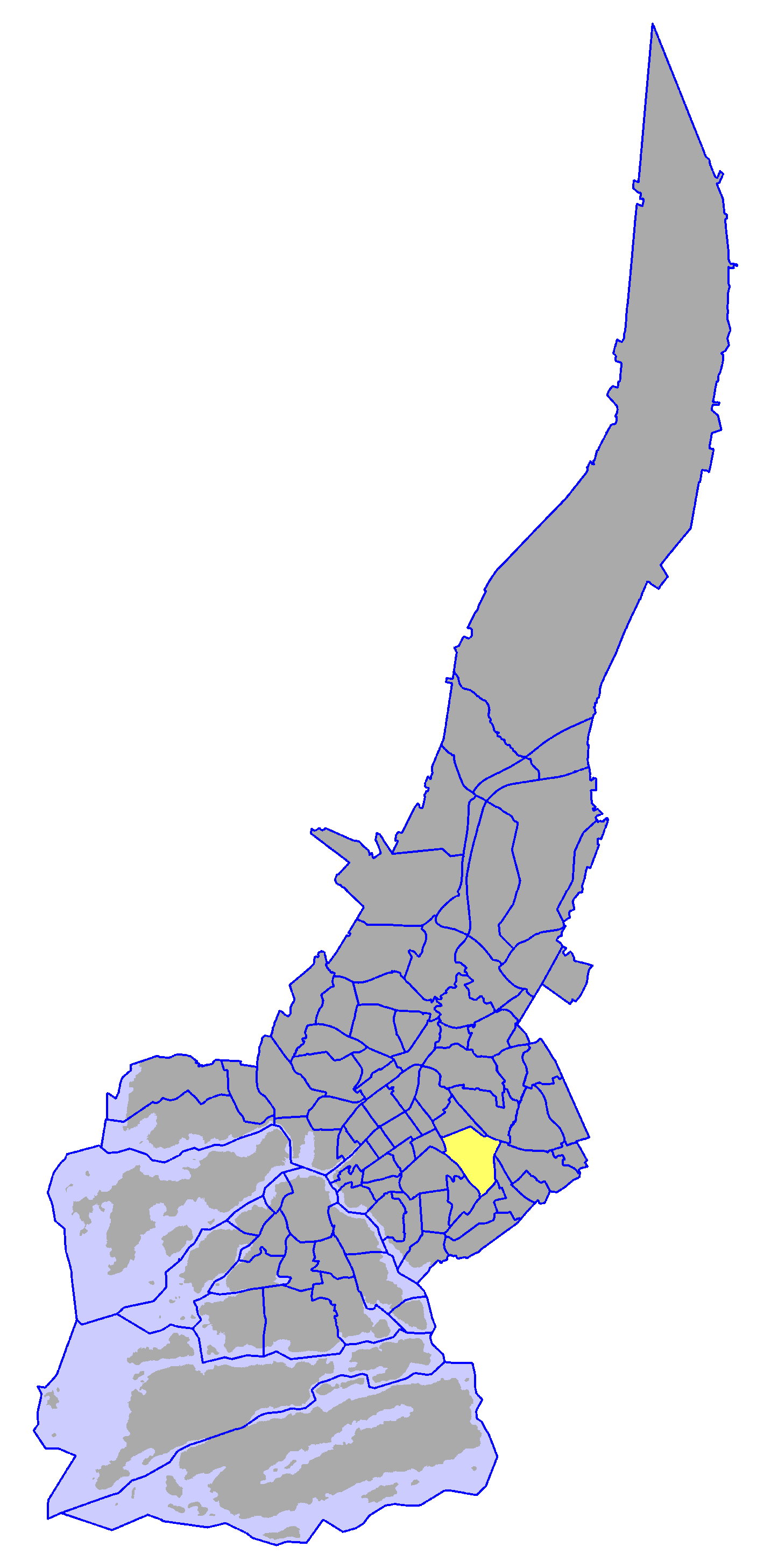
Vasaramäki on a map of Turku.

Vasaramäki (Swedish: Hammarbacka) is a district in the Uittamo-Skanssi ward of the city of Turku, in Finland. It is located to the southeast of the city centre, and is mainly a low-density residential suburb. The name consists of the words vasara meaning 'hammer' and mäki meaning 'hill'.

The current (as of 2004) population of Vasaramäki is 3,949, and it is decreasing at an annual rate of 0.15%. 12.64% of the district's population are under 15 years old, while 24.21% are over 65. The district's linguistic makeup is 92.68% Finnish, 5.95% Swedish, and 1.37% other.

== See also ==
- Districts of Turku
- Districts of Turku by population
