= Pahaniemi =

City district in Turku, Finland

Coordinates: 60°27′25″N 22°12′00″E

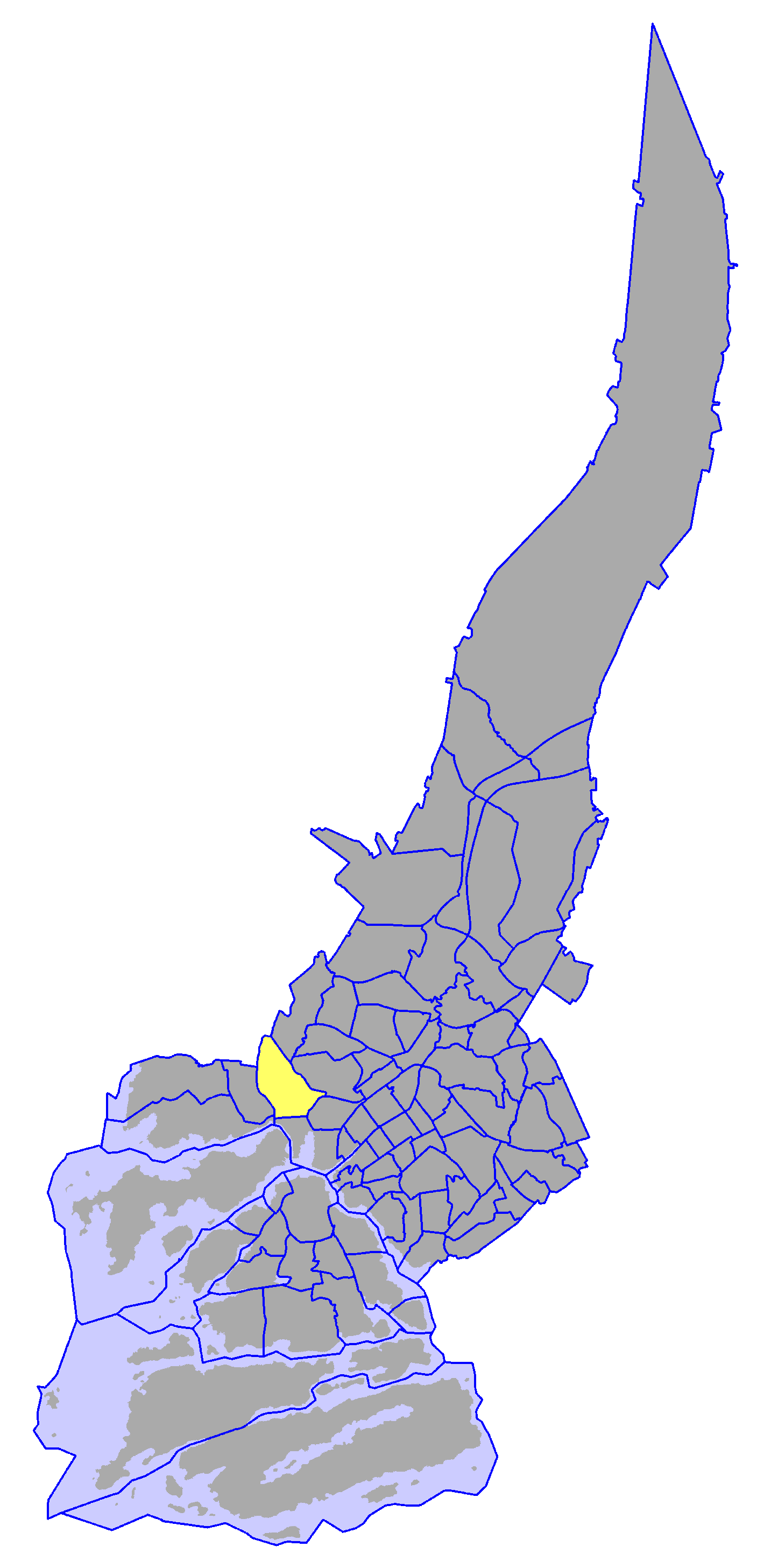
Pahaniemi on a map of Turku

Pahaniemi is a district in the Naantalintie ward of the city of Turku, in Finland. It is located to the west of the city, and is mainly a high-density residential suburb.

The current (as of 2004) population of Pahaniemi is 4,397, and it is decreasing at an annual rate of 2.25%. 15.62% of the district's population are under 15 years old, while 13.67% are over 65. The district's linguistic makeup is 90.90% Finnish, 2.37% Swedish, and 6.73% other.

== See also ==
- Districts of Turku
- Districts of Turku by population
