= Pääskyvuori =

District of Turku, Finland

Coordinates: 60°26′38″N 22°20′22″E

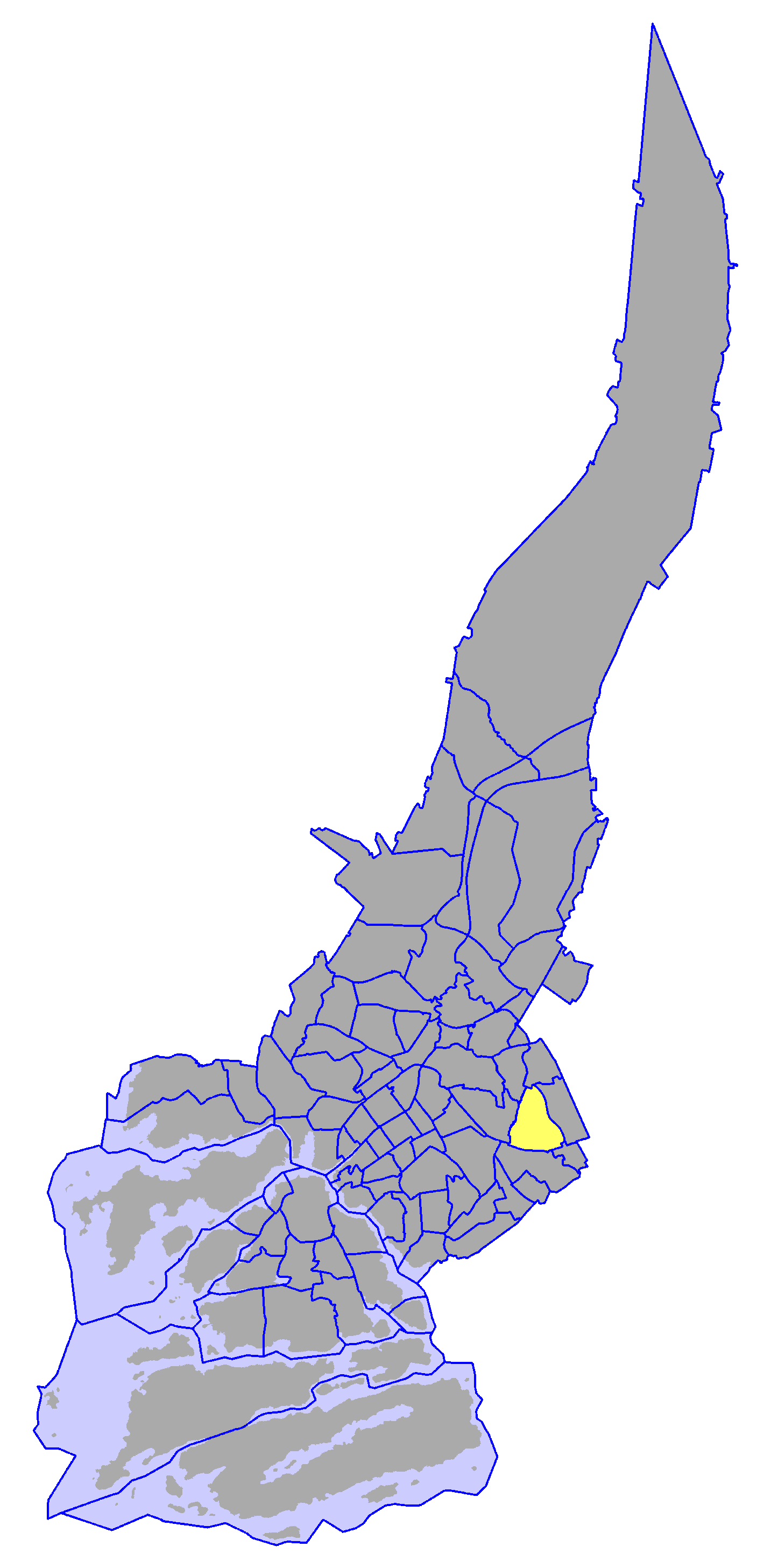
Pääskyvuori on a map of Turku.

Pääskyvuori (Finnish; Svalberga in Swedish) is a district in the Itäharju-Varissuo ward of the city of Turku, in Finland. It is located to the east of the city between Varissuo and Itäharju and is largely a low-density residential suburb. Pääskyvuori also includes the more densely built area of Laukkavuori. The name consists of the words pääsky, meaning 'swallow', and vuori, meaning 'mountain'. The former television tower located in the district is the tallest free-standing structure (122 m) in the Turku area.

The current (as of 2004) population of Pääskyvuori is 4,482, and it is increasing at an annual rate of 0.18%. 20.91% of the district's population are under 15 years old, while 13.43% are over 65. The district's linguistic makeup is 92.24% Finnish, 3.32% Swedish, and 4.44% other.

== See also ==
- Districts of Turku
- Districts of Turku by population
