= Ruohonpää =

District of Turku, Finland

Coordinates: 60°28′N 22°14′E

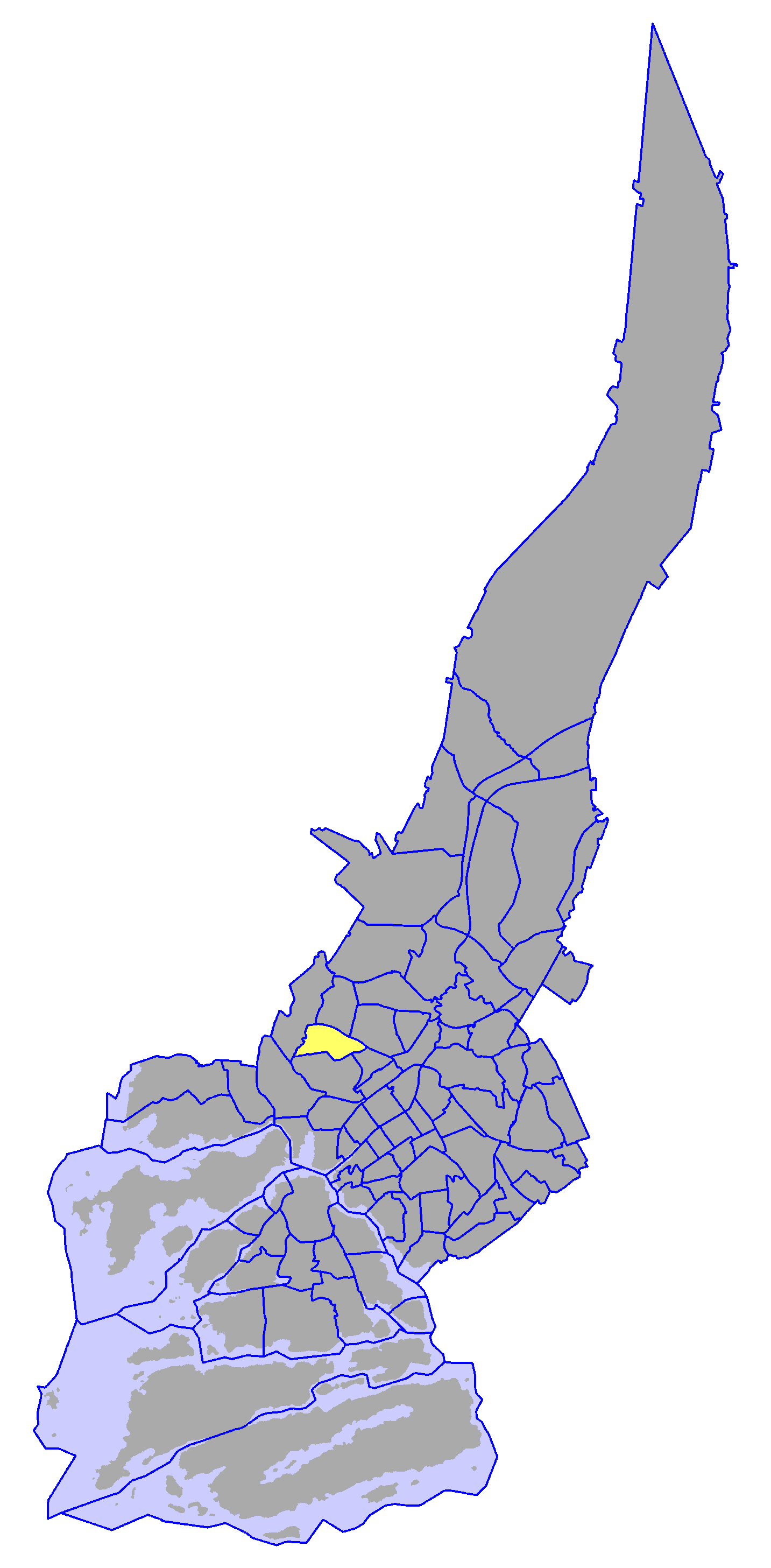
Ruohonpää on a map of Turku.

Ruohonpää is a district in the Kuninkoja ward of the city of Turku, in Finland. It is located to the west of the city, and is mainly a low-density residential suburb.

The current (as of 2004) population of Ruohonpää is 2,375, and it is decreasing at an annual rate of 0.59%. 12.04% of the district's population are under 15 years old, while 25.89% are over 65. The district's linguistic makeup is 94.32% Finnish, 3.87% Swedish, and 1.81% other.

== See also ==
- Districts of Turku
- Districts of Turku by population
