= Mälikkälä =

District of Turku, Finland

Coordinates: 60°28′25″N 22°13′5″E

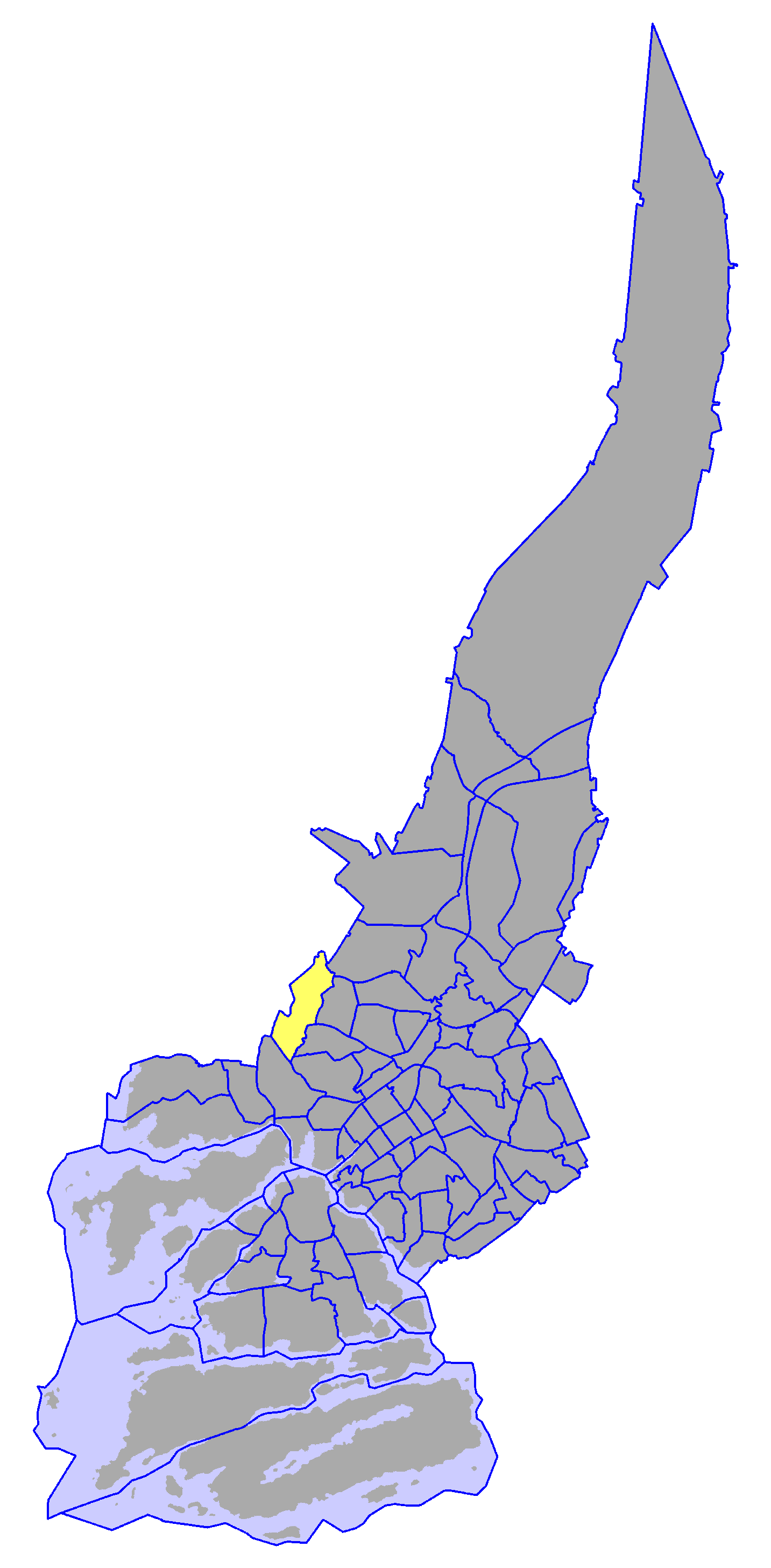
Mälikkälä on a map of Turku.

Mälikkälä is a district in the Kuninkoja ward of the city of Turku, in Finland. It is located to the west of the city, and is mainly a low-density residential suburb.

The population of Mälikkälä (as of 2004) is 1,608, and it is decreasing at an annual rate of 0.50%. 15.49% of the district's population are under 15 years old, while 22.70% are over 65. The district's linguistic makeup is 95.52% Finnish, 3.79% Swedish, and 0.68% other.

== See also ==
- Districts of Turku
- Districts of Turku by population
