= Pohjola, Turku =

City district in Turku, Finland

Coordinates: 60°27′30″N 22°15′30″E

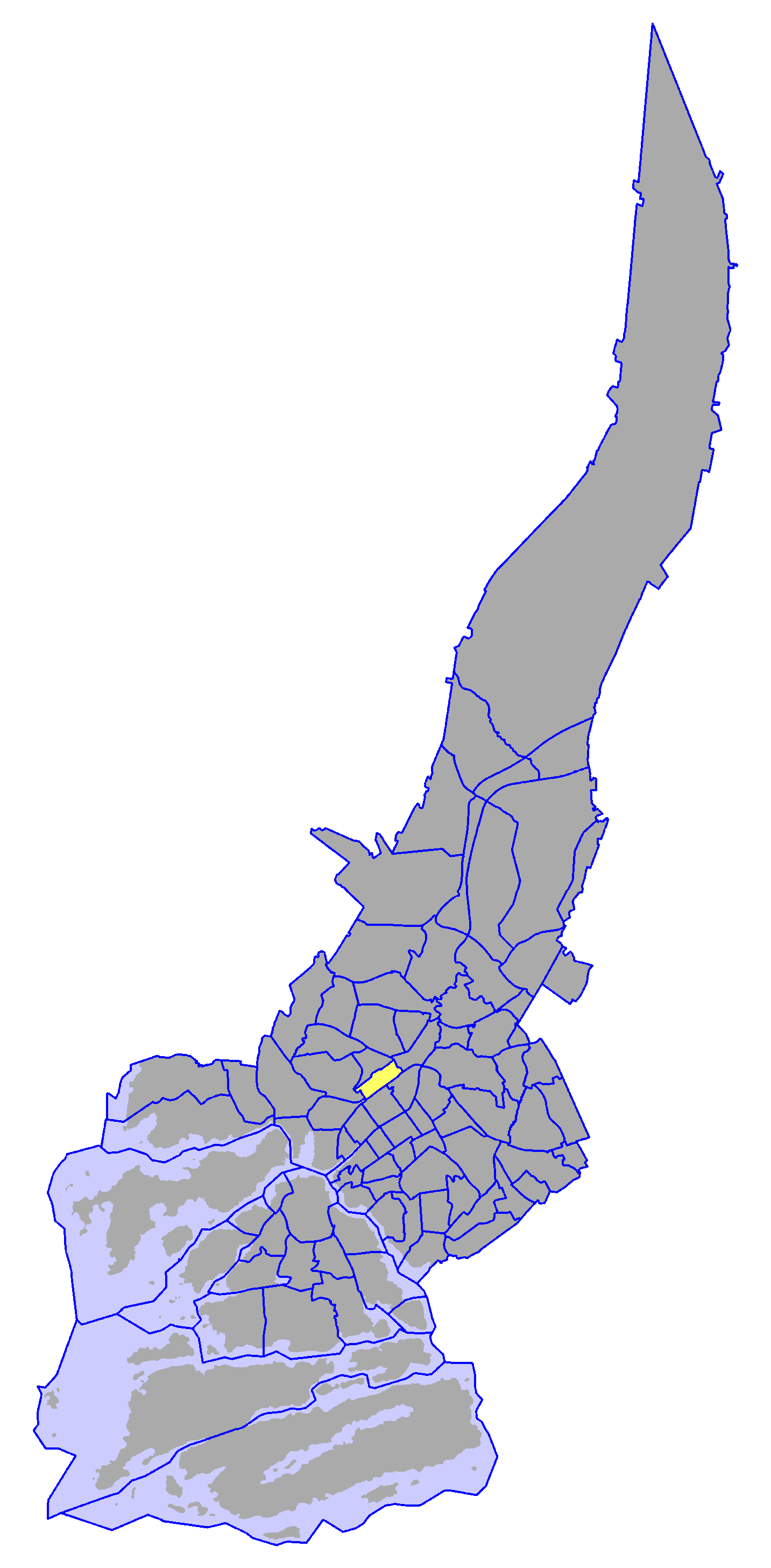
Pohjola on a map of Turku.

Pohjola (Swedish: Norrstan) is a district of the city of Turku, in Finland. It is located to the north of the city centre, between Ratapihankatu and Kähäri. Turku Central railway station is located in Pohjola, and about half of the district's land area is owned by the VR railway company.

The current (as of 2004) population of Pohjola is 1,569, and it is decreasing at an annual rate of 1.27%. 12.62% of the district's population are under 15 years old, while 13.77% are over 65. The district's linguistic makeup is 94.26% Finnish, 3.76% Swedish, and 1.98% other.

== See also ==
- Districts of Turku
- Districts of Turku by population

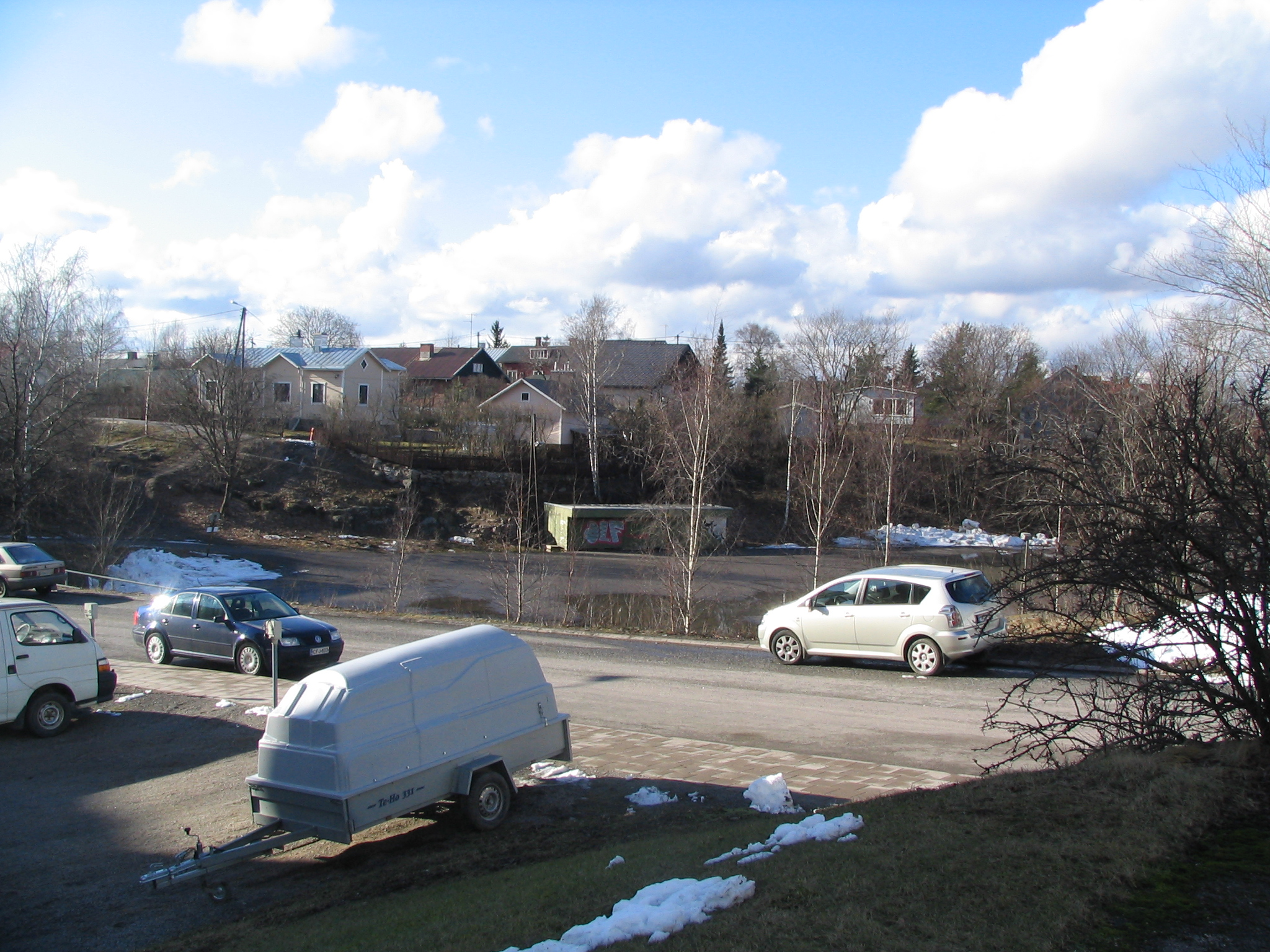
Image of sports field of Kähäri
