= Harittu =

District of Turku, Finland

Coordinates: 60°24′50″N 22°18′25″E

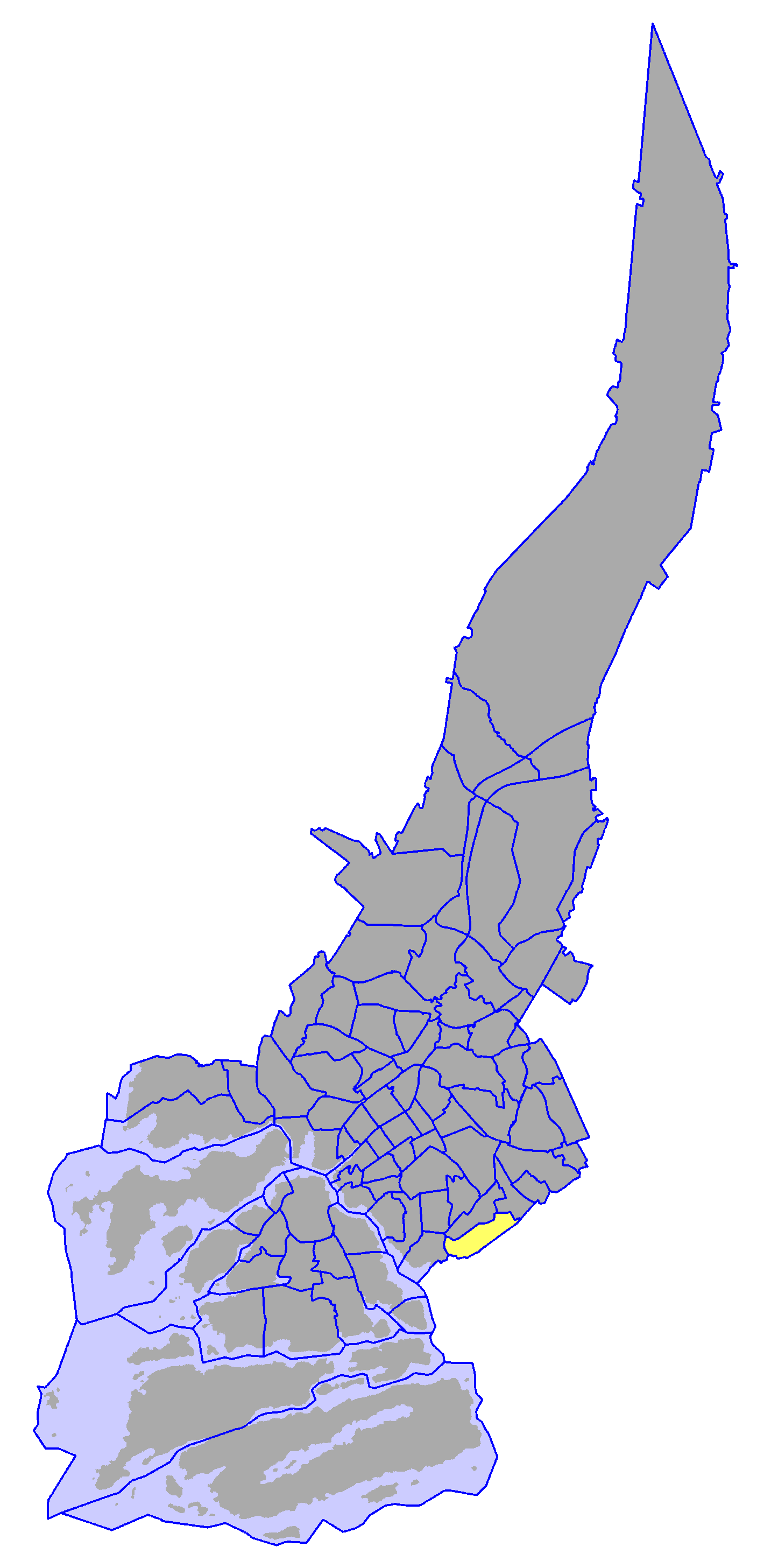
Harittu on a map of Turku.

Harittu is a district in the Uittamo-Skanssi ward of the city of Turku, in Finland. It is located in the southeast of the city, bordering the neighbouring municipality of Kaarina.

The current (as of 2004) population of Harittu is 3,870, and it is increasing at an annual rate of 1.47%. 23.00% of the district's population are under 15 years old, while 4.19% are over 65. The district's linguistic makeup is 87.42% Finnish, 5.32% Swedish, and 7.26% other.

The Harittu area is a diverse and growing residential district in Turku. Although the population has declined slightly, median income has increased by 18.2% over the past five years, and the share of residents with a higher education degree has risen to 39.5%. The area has a 51% homeownership rate

== History of Harittu ==
Harittu was one of the coastal villages established during the Middle Ages. The village was part of the wide open area surrounding Rauvola Bay. It was bordered by Pisuvuori in the west and Vaarniemenkallio in the east. In the 1939 municipal consolidation, part of Kaarina was transferred to Turku, and an artificial border was drawn through Harittu. However, the current district of Harittu still largely follows the old village boundaries.

Detached housing began to spread into the farmland landscapes from the mid-20th century onwards. The next wave of construction came in the 1970s and 1980s, when apartment buildings and smaller residential houses were built in the area. By the late 1990s, the fields had been completely built over.

== See also ==
- Districts of Turku
- Districts of Turku by population
