= Lauste =

District of Turku, Finland

Coordinates: 60°26′01″N 22°20′21″E

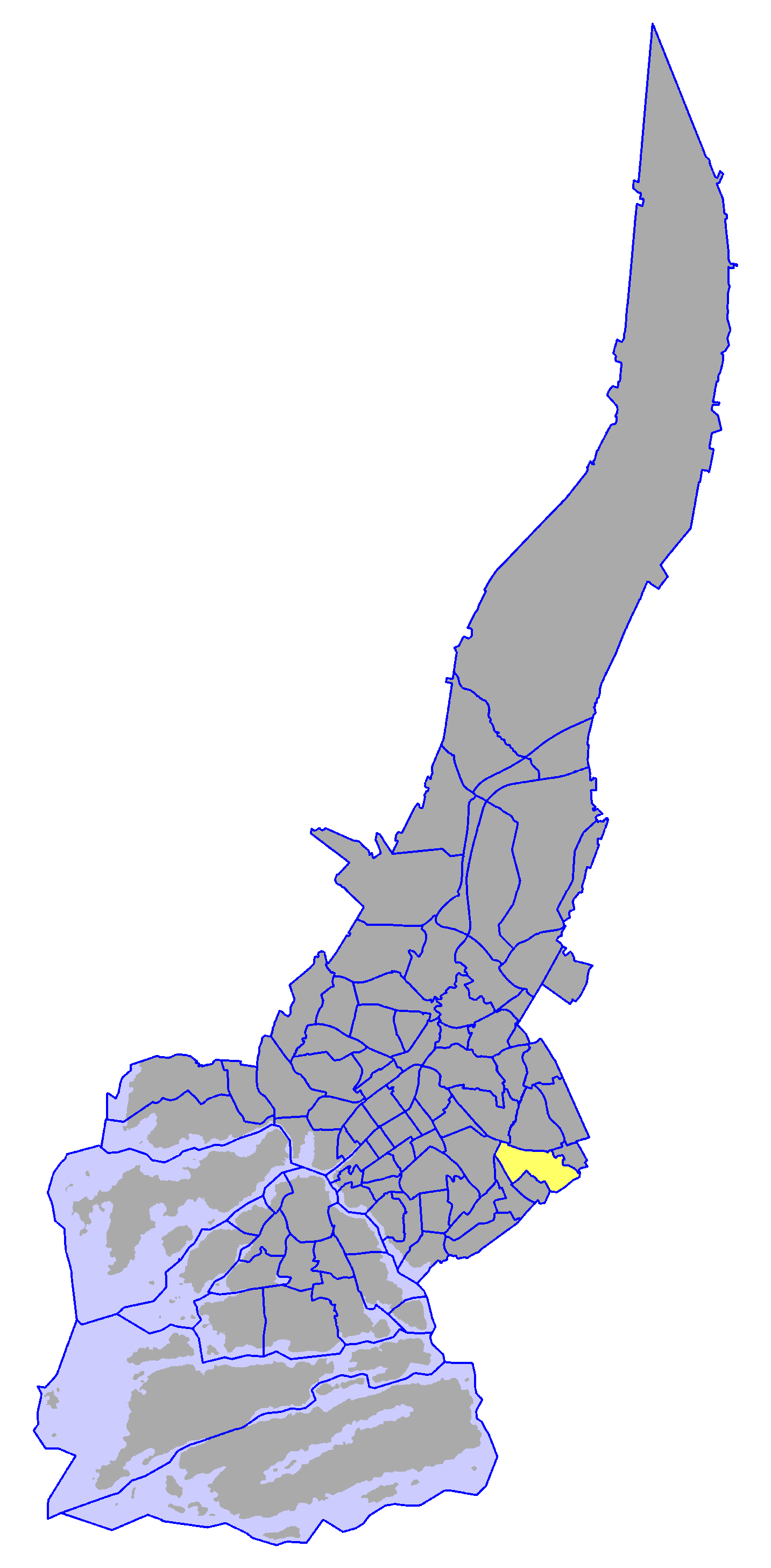
Lauste on a map of Turku.

Lauste (Finnish; Laustis in Swedish) is a district and a suburb of the city of Turku, Finland. It is located in the eastern part of the city, bordering the neighbouring city of Kaarina. It is rather densely populated, having a population of 3,405 (as of 2004). Its population is rapidly decreasing, however – it has an annual population growth rate of -5.73%, which is the lowest of all districts of Turku.

17.00% of the district's population are under 15 years old, while 11.51% are over 65. The district's linguistic makeup is 75.18% Finnish, 1.59% Swedish, and 23.23% other. This reflects the fact that Lauste is one of the areas with the highest proportion of immigrants in the city.

== See also ==
- Districts of Turku
- Districts of Turku by population
