= Saramäki =

City district in Turku, Finland

Coordinates: 60°30′53″N 22°18′12″E

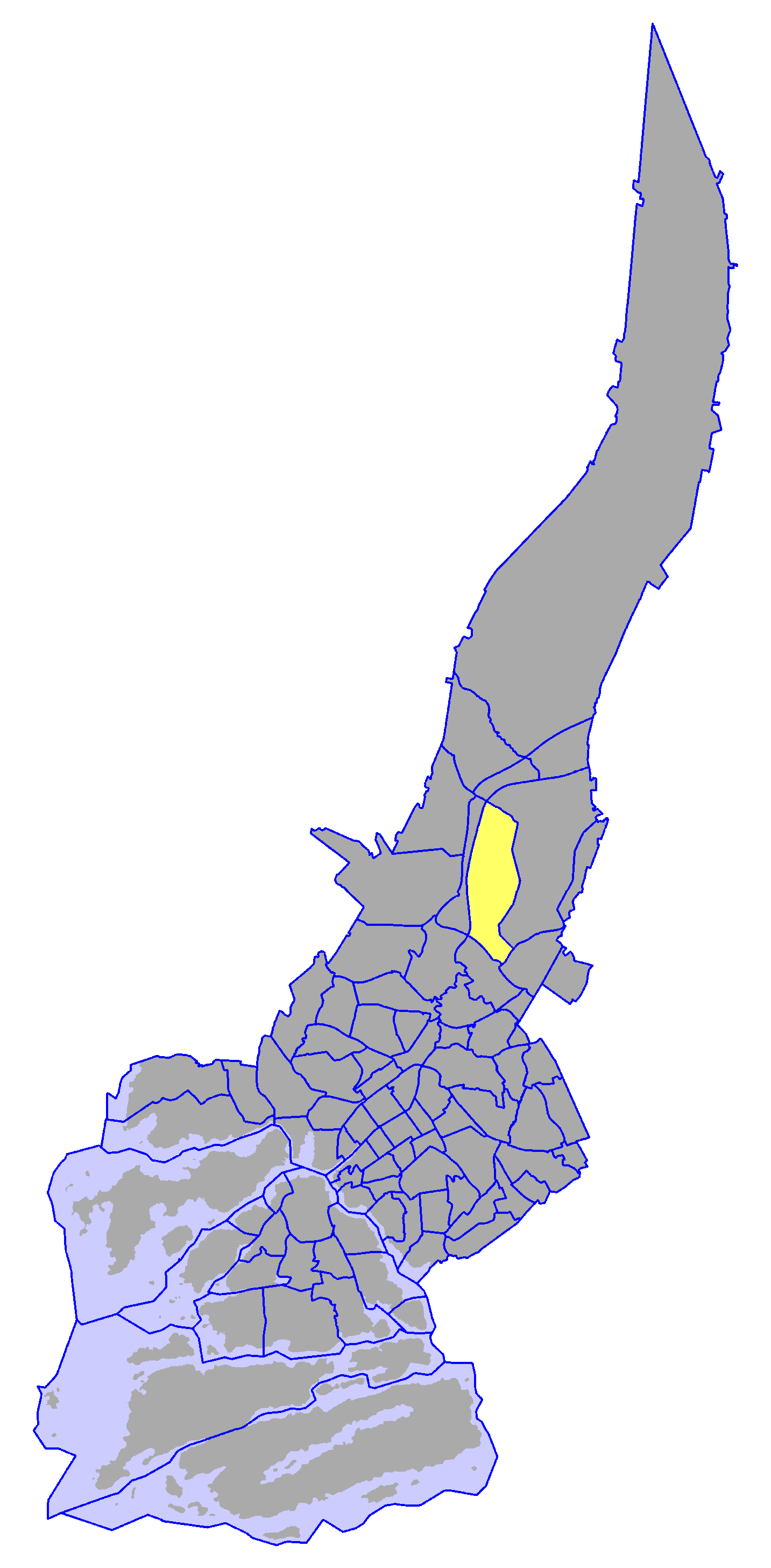
Saramäki on a map of Turku.

Saramäki (Finnish; Starrbacka in Swedish) is a district in the Maaria-Paattinen ward of the city of Turku, in Finland. It is located to the north of the city, and is a very sparsely populated area.

The current (as of 2004) population of Saramäki is 530, and it is decreasing at an annual rate of 1.70%. 16.60% of the district's population are under 15 years old, while 15.09% are over 65. The district's linguistic makeup is 95.28% Finnish, 0.75% Swedish, and 3.96% other.

== See also ==
- Districts of Turku
- Districts of Turku by population
