= Puistomäki =

- District of city
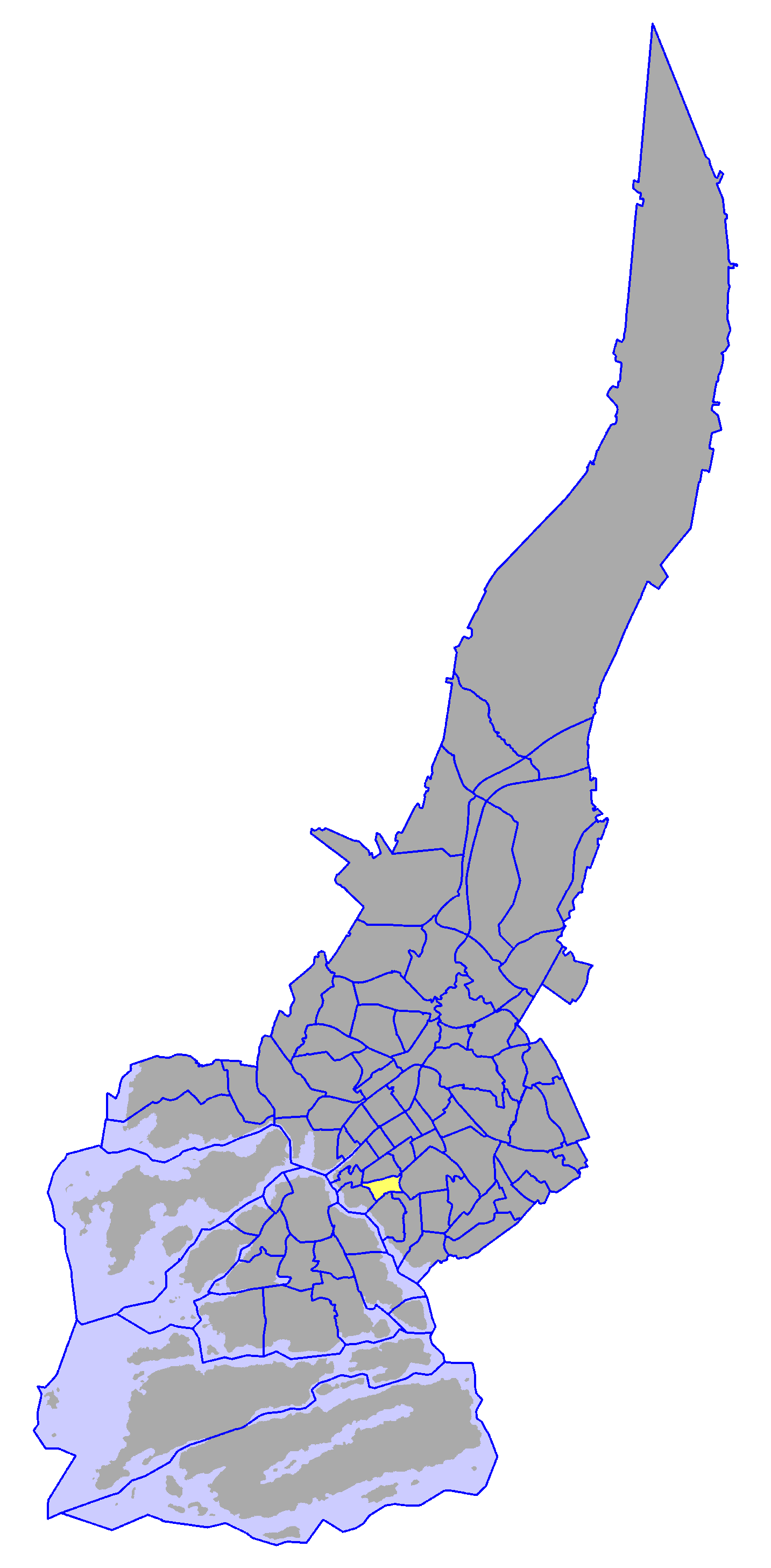
- Puistomäki on a map of Turku

- Puistomäki on a map of Finland
- Coordinates: 60°25′43″N 22°15′11″E

Puistomäki (Finnish; Parkbacken in Swedish) is a district in the Uittamo-Skanssi ward of the city of Turku, in Finland. It is located to the south of the city centre, and is mainly a low-density residential suburb.

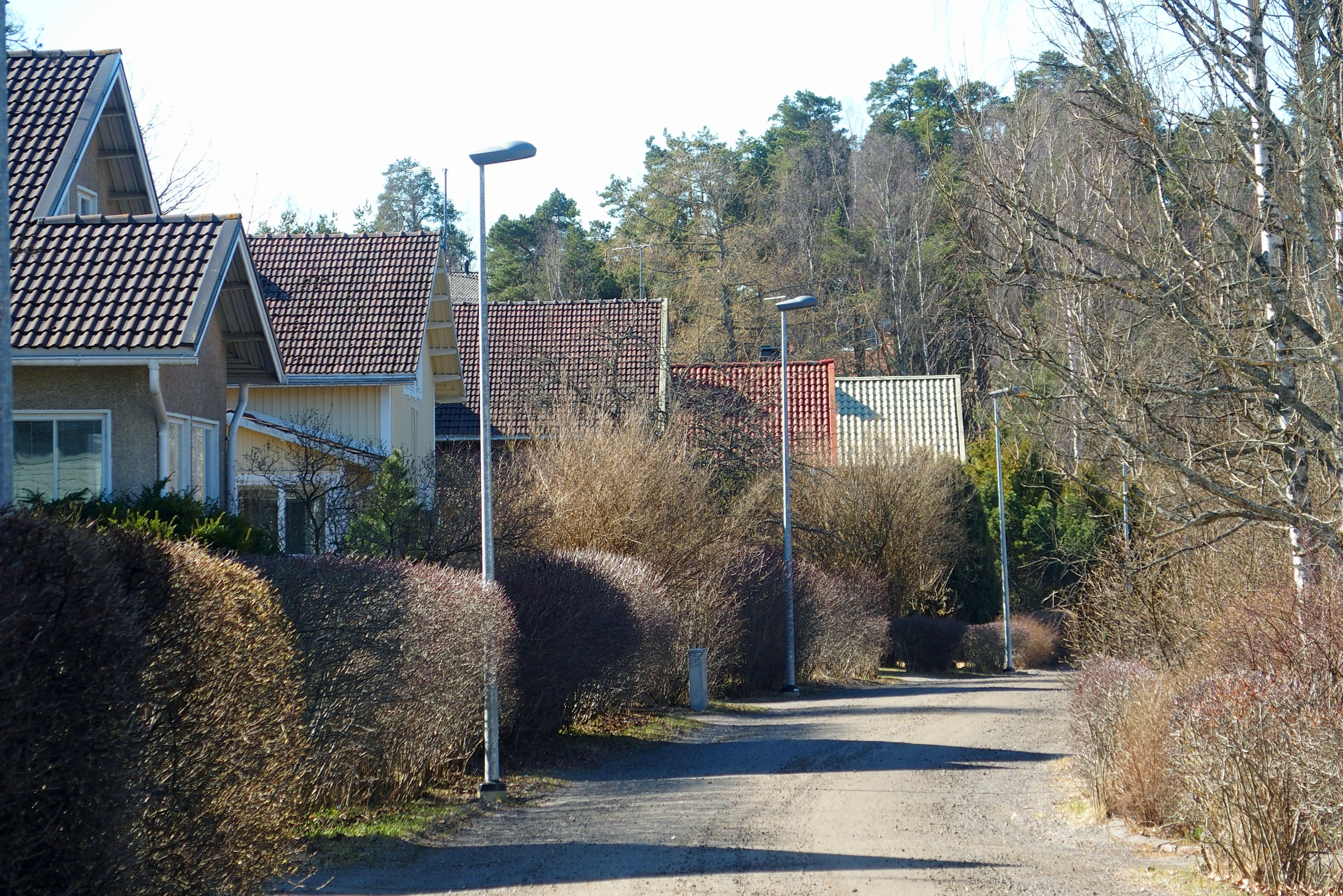
Houses in the newer, eastern, part of Puistomäki.

as of 2004 the population of Puistomäki was 734, and was increasing at an annual rate of 6.13%. 17.30% of the district's population are under 15 years old, while 12.81% are over 65. The district's linguistic makeup is 90.46% Finnish, 5.59% Swedish, and 3.95% other.

== See also ==
- Districts of Turku
- Districts of Turku by population
