= Raunistula =

City district in Turku, Finland

Coordinates: 60°27′50″N 22°16′15″E

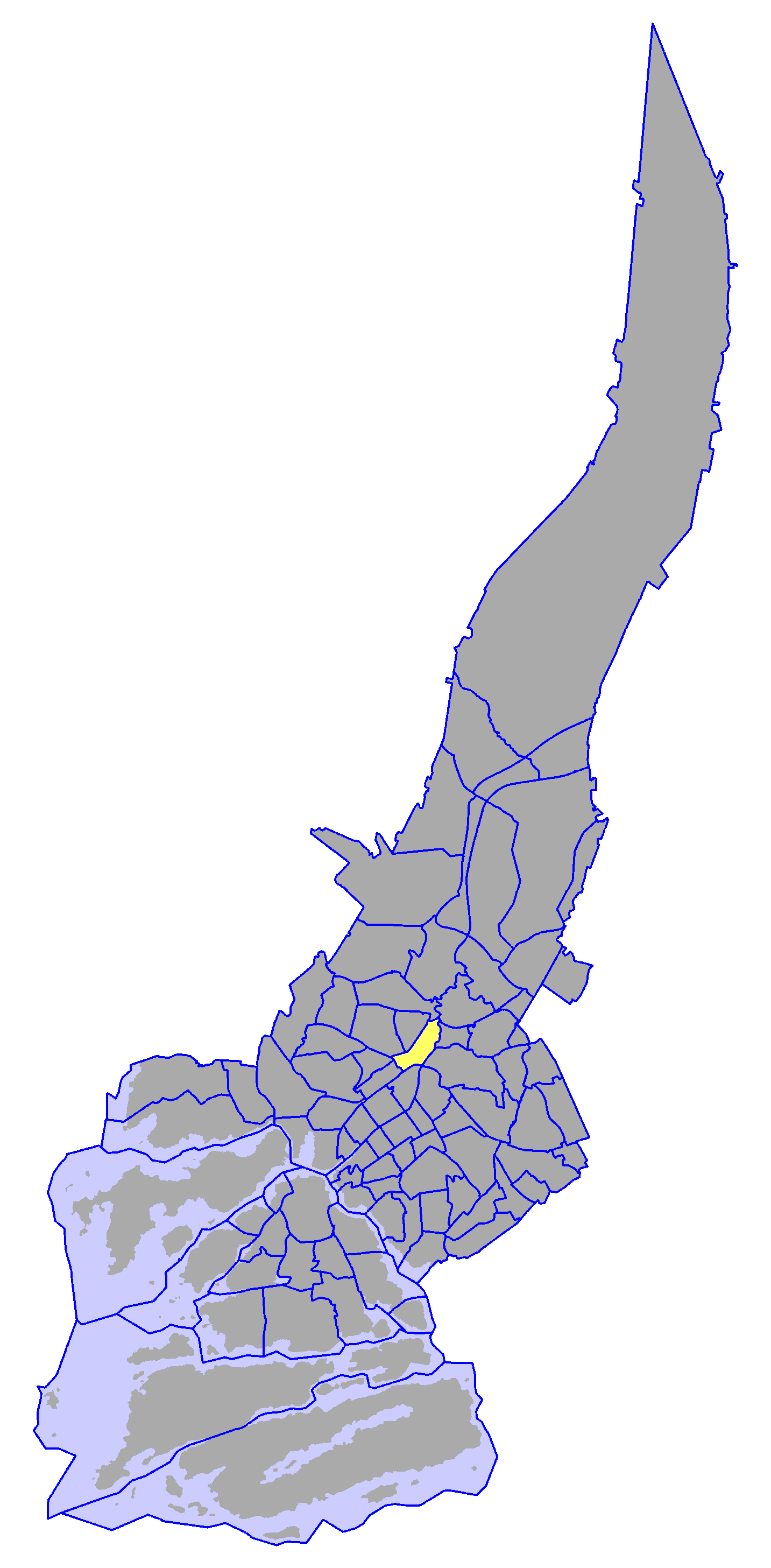
Raunistula on a map of Turku.

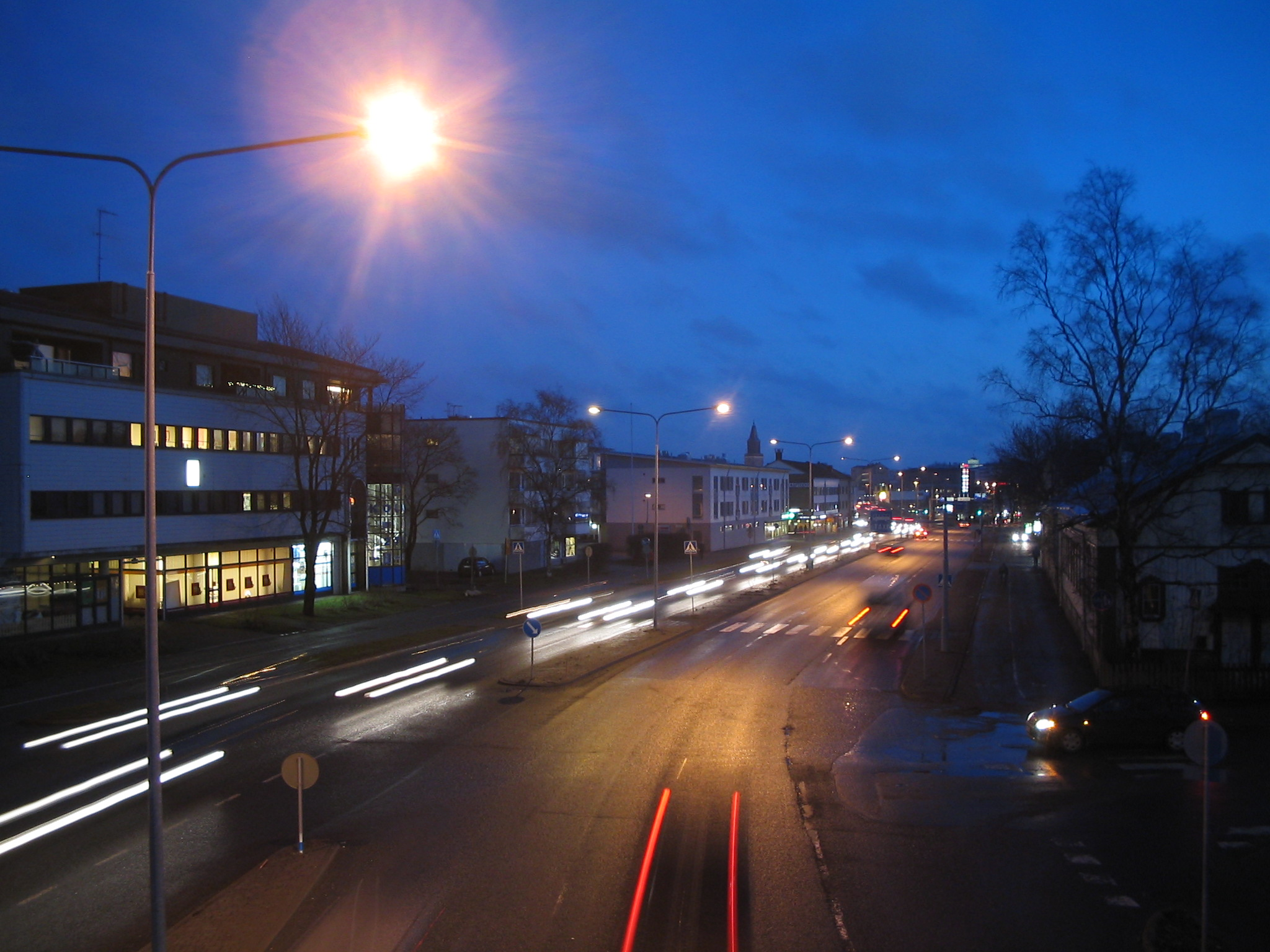
Raunistulanportti is a gateway to the city centre

Raunistula is a district of the city of Turku, in Finland. It is located to the north of the city centre, on the west bank of the river Aura. Raunistula consists mostly of low-density residential area, and the remains of the industrial area there are to be redeveloped into residences in the near future.

The current (as of 2004) population of Raunistula is 1,442, and it is increasing at an annual rate of 3.47%. 13.87% of the district's population are under 15 years old, while 13.38% are over 65. The district's linguistic makeup is 92.02% Finnish, 4.92% Swedish, and 3.05% other.

== See also ==
- Districts of Turku
- Districts of Turku by population
