= Vätti =

District of Turku, Finland

Coordinates: 60°28′0″N 22°15′20″E

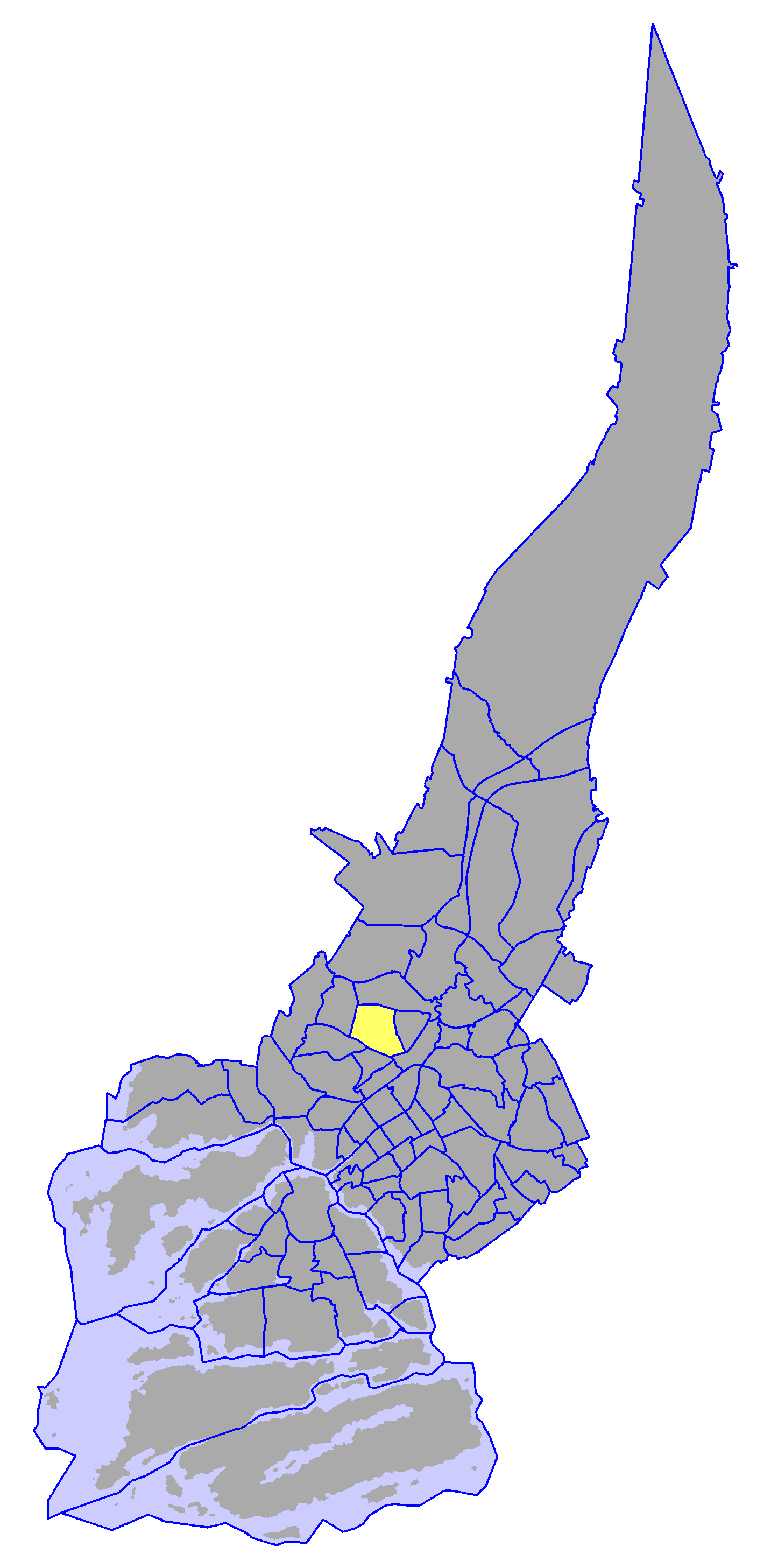
Vätti on a map of Turku.

Vätti is a district of the city of Turku, in Finland. It is located to the north of the city centre. The area consists mostly of parkland, but there is also a high-density residential area in the district as well as some low-density developments. There is also an old people's home in Vätti.

The current (as of 2004) population of Vätti is 2,990, and it is decreasing at an annual rate of 0.07%. 11.30% of the district's population are under 15 years old, while 30.60% are over 65. The district's linguistic makeup is 95.45% Finnish, 2.37% Swedish, and 2.17% other.

== See also ==
- Districts of Turku
- Districts of Turku by population
