= Ilpoinen =

District of Turku, Finland

Coordinates: 60°25′20″N 22°17′10″E

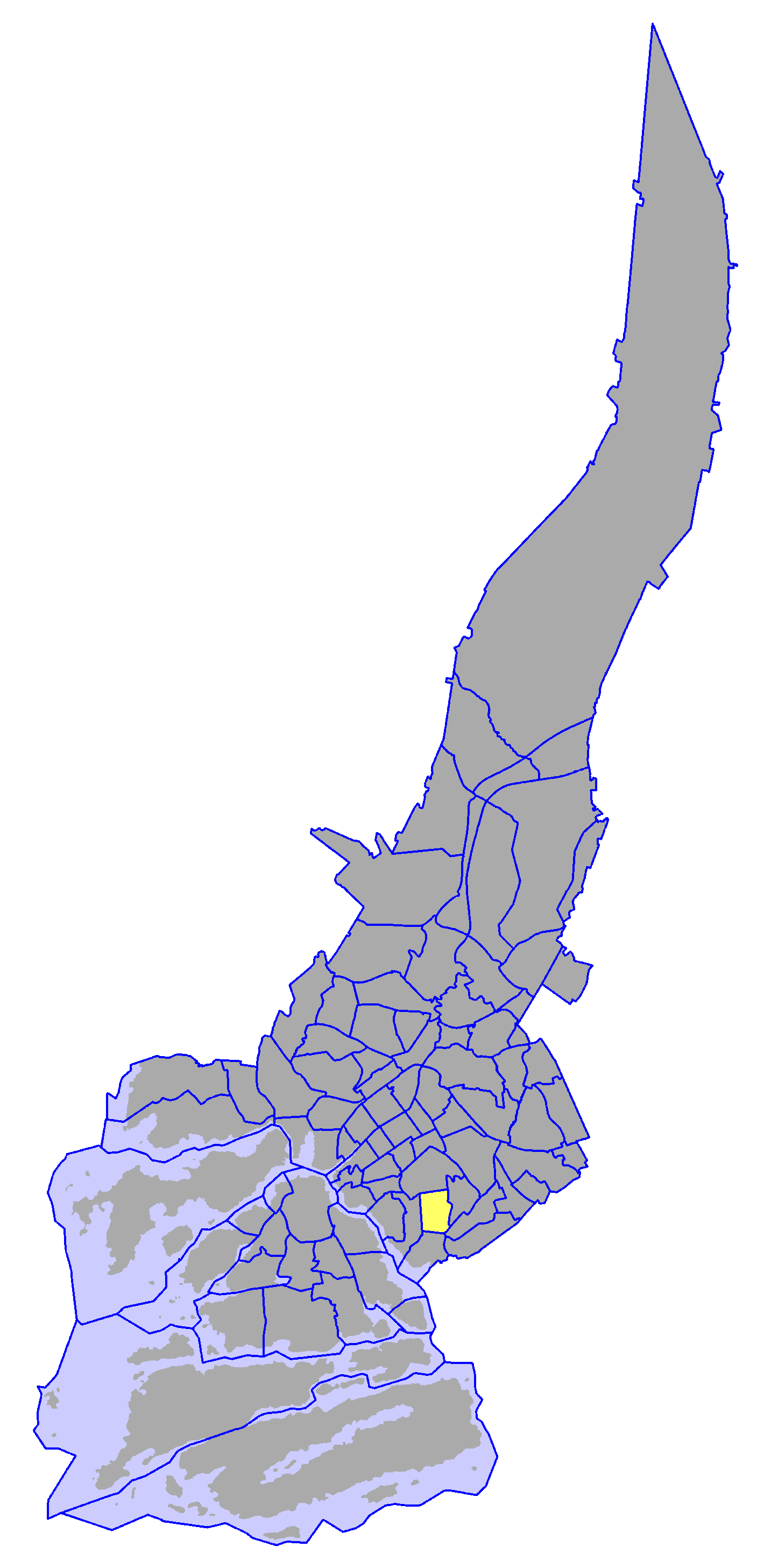
Ilpoinen on a map of Turku.

Ilpoinen (Finnish; Ilpois in Swedish) is a district in the Uittamo-Skanssi ward of the city of Turku, in Finland. It is located in the southeast of the city, and is mainly a high-density residential area.

The current (as of 2004) population of Ilpoinen is 2,889, and it is decreasing at an annual rate of 0.14%. 15.26% of the district's population are under 15 years old, while 15.99% are over 65. The district's linguistic makeup is 91.03% Finnish, 6.30% Swedish, and 2.67% other.

== See also ==
- Districts of Turku
- Districts of Turku by population
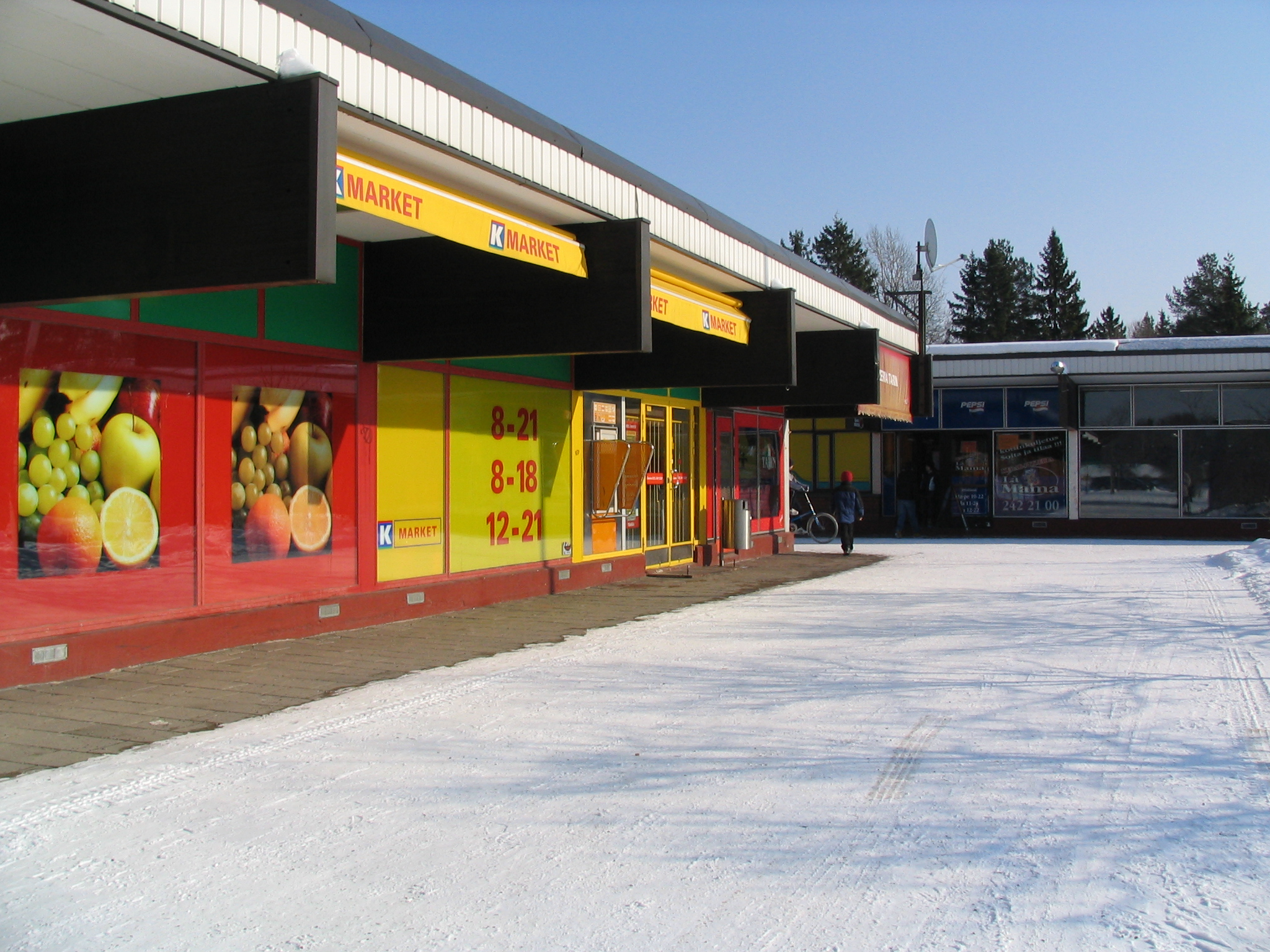
K-kauppa at small shopping center of Ilpoinen

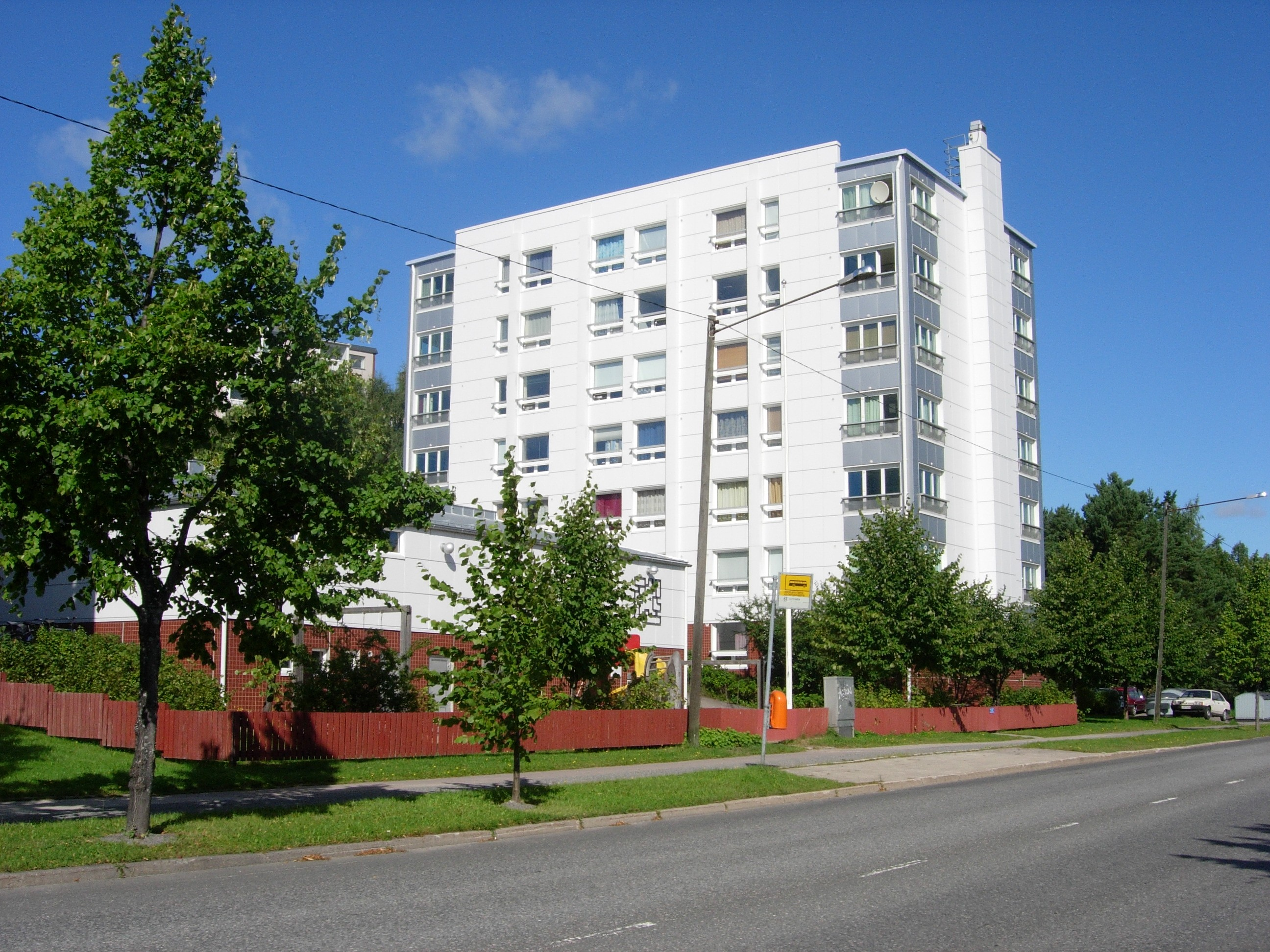
"Ironside", houses of The Turku Student Village Foundation in Ilpoinen
