= Jäkärlä =

District of Turku, Finland

Coordinates: 60°32′35″N 22°21′35″E

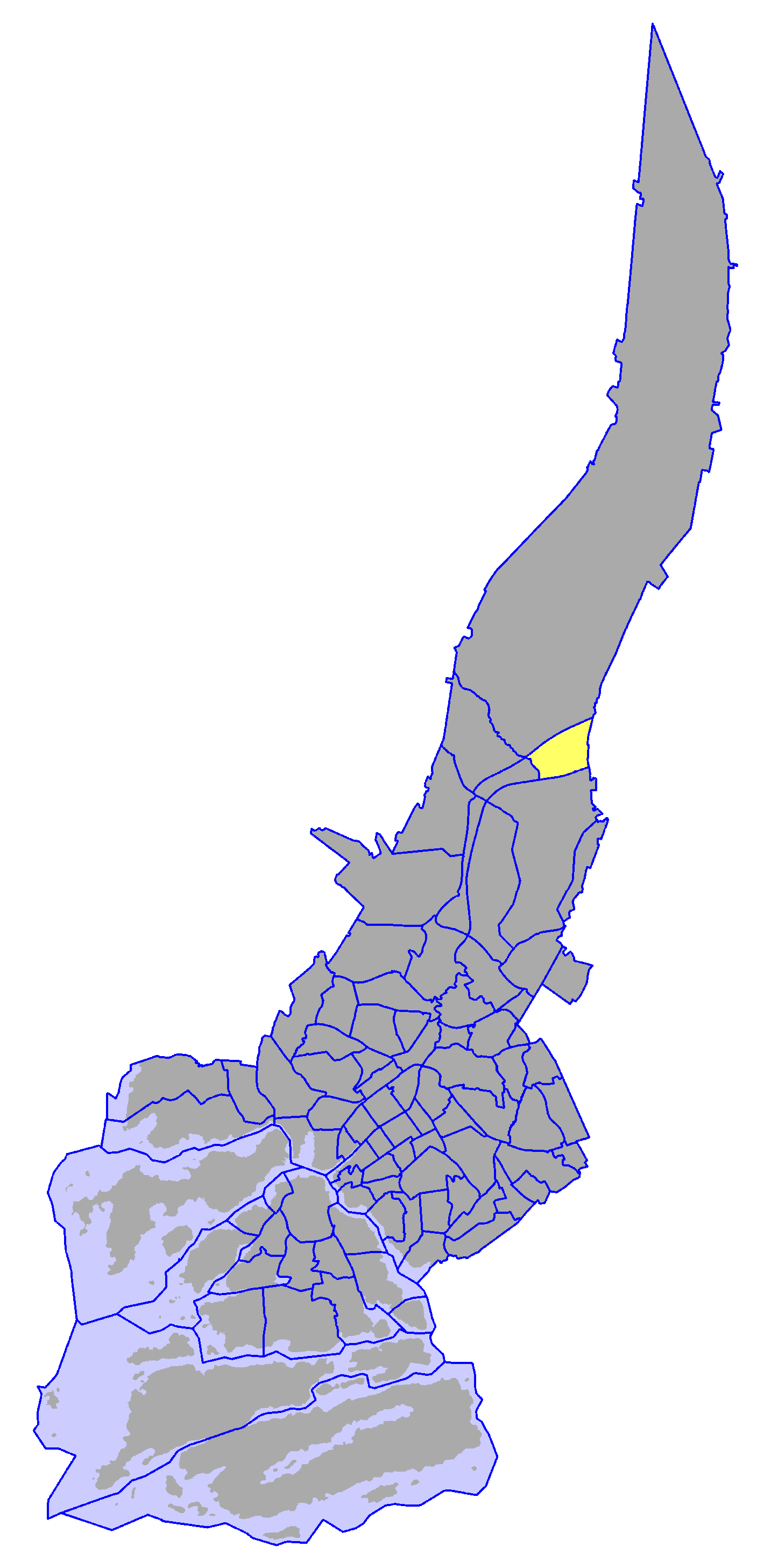
Jäkärlä on a map of Turku.

Jäkärlä is a district in the Maaria-Paattinen ward of the city of Turku, in Finland. It is located to the north of the city, and is a very sparsely populated area.

The current (as of 2004) population of Jäkärlä is 3,460, and it is decreasing at an annual rate of 0.43%. 19.31% of the district's population are under 15 years old, while 8.32% are over 65. The district's linguistic makeup is 93.18% Finnish, 1.45% Swedish, and 5.38% other.

== See also ==
- Districts of Turku
- Districts of Turku by population
