= Räntämäki =

District of Turku, Finland

Coordinates: 60°28′30″N 22°18′15″E

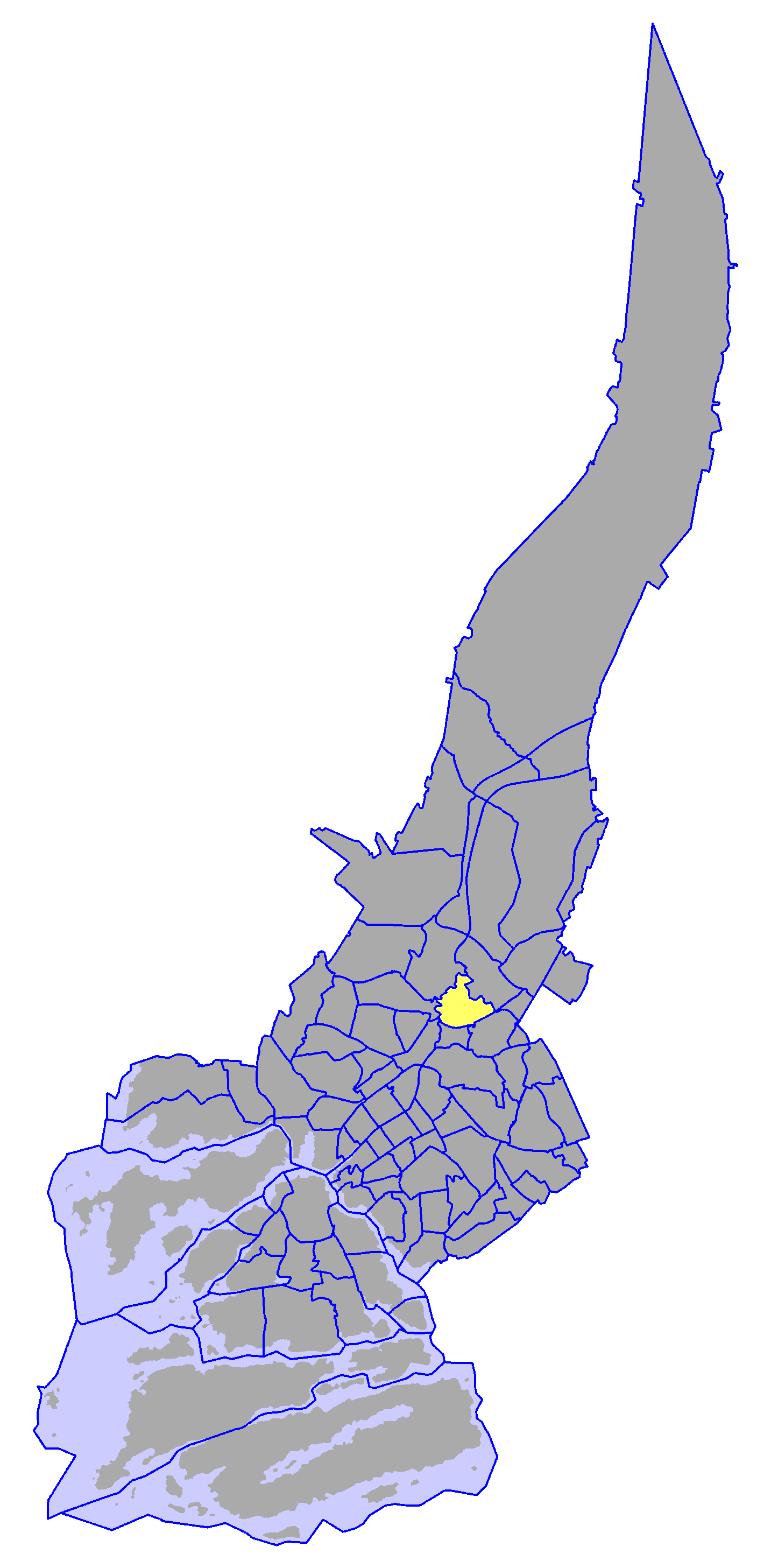
Räntämäki on a map of Turku.

Räntämäki is a district in the Koroinen ward of the city of Turku, in Finland. It is located to the north of the city, and consists mostly of low-density residential area.

== Population ==
The current (as of 2004) population of Räntämäki is 1,924, and it is increasing at an annual rate of 0.68%. 17.78% of the district's population are under 15 years old, while 9.20% are over 65. The district's linguistic makeup is 88.31% Finnish, 5.15% Swedish, and 6.55% other.

== See also ==
- Districts of Turku
- Districts of Turku by population
