= Iso-Heikkilä =

City district in Turku, Finland

Coordinates: 60.447°N 22.227°E

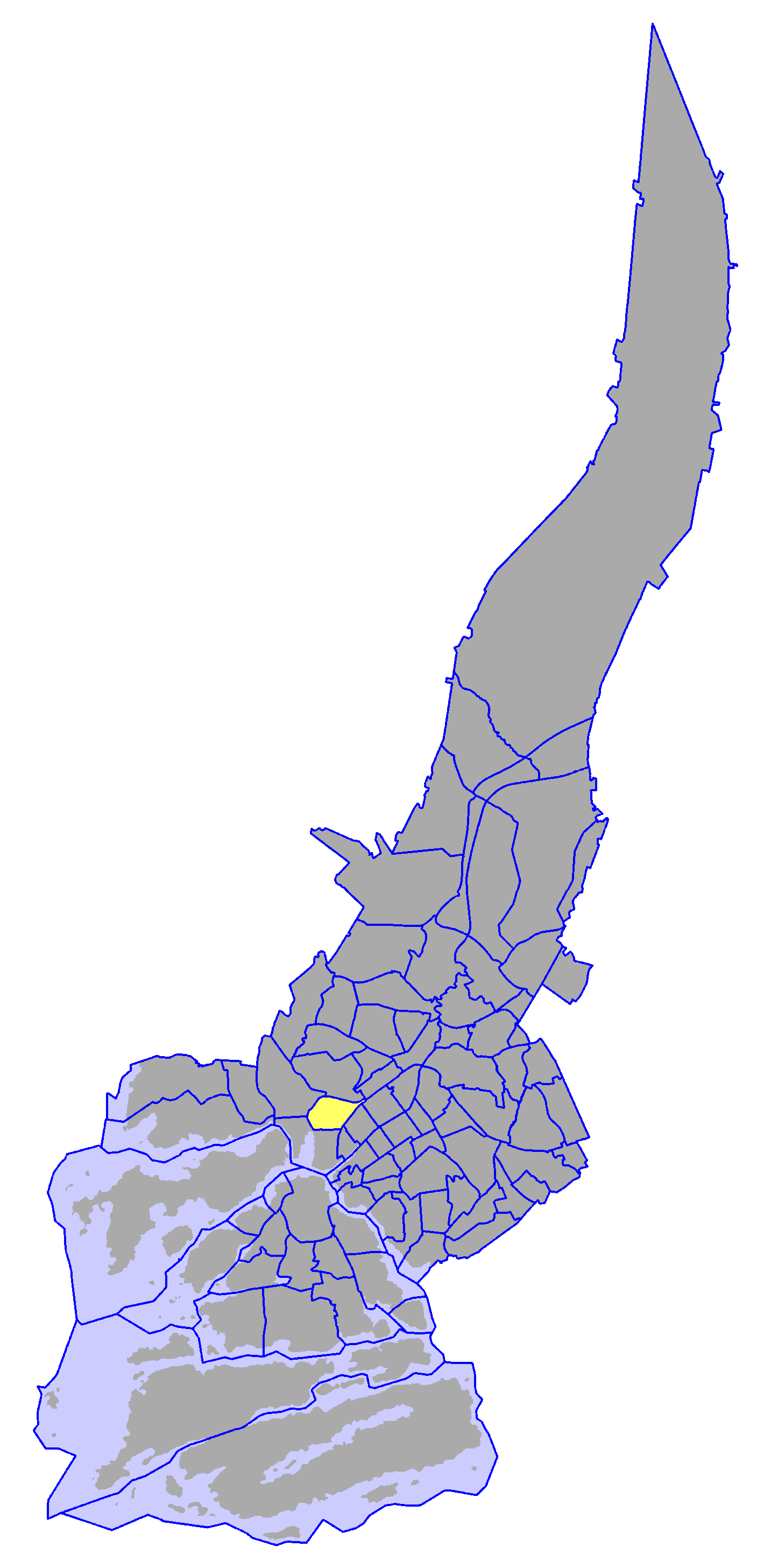
Iso-Heikkilä on a map of Turku.

Iso-Heikkilä (Finnish; Storheikkilä in Swedish) is a district of the city of Turku, in Finland. It is located to the west of the city centre, bordering on the city centre's VIII District (Port Arthur).

The current (as of 2004) population of Iso-Heikkilä is 1,905, and it is decreasing at an annual rate of 0.79%. Only 4.57% of the district's population is under 15 years old, while 35.17% are over 65. Iso-Heikkilä thus has one of the oldest populations in Turku. The district's linguistic makeup is 94.86% Finnish, 3.94% Swedish, and 1.21% other languages.

Most of Iso-Heikkilä is industrial area and offices, but there is also a residential area with a children's daycare centre and a home for the elderly.

The Iso-Heikkilä Observatory is located in the Iso-Heikkilä district.

== See also ==
- Districts of Turku
- Districts of Turku by population
