= VII District, Turku =

City district in Turku, Finland

Coordinates: 60°27′00″N 22°15′30″E

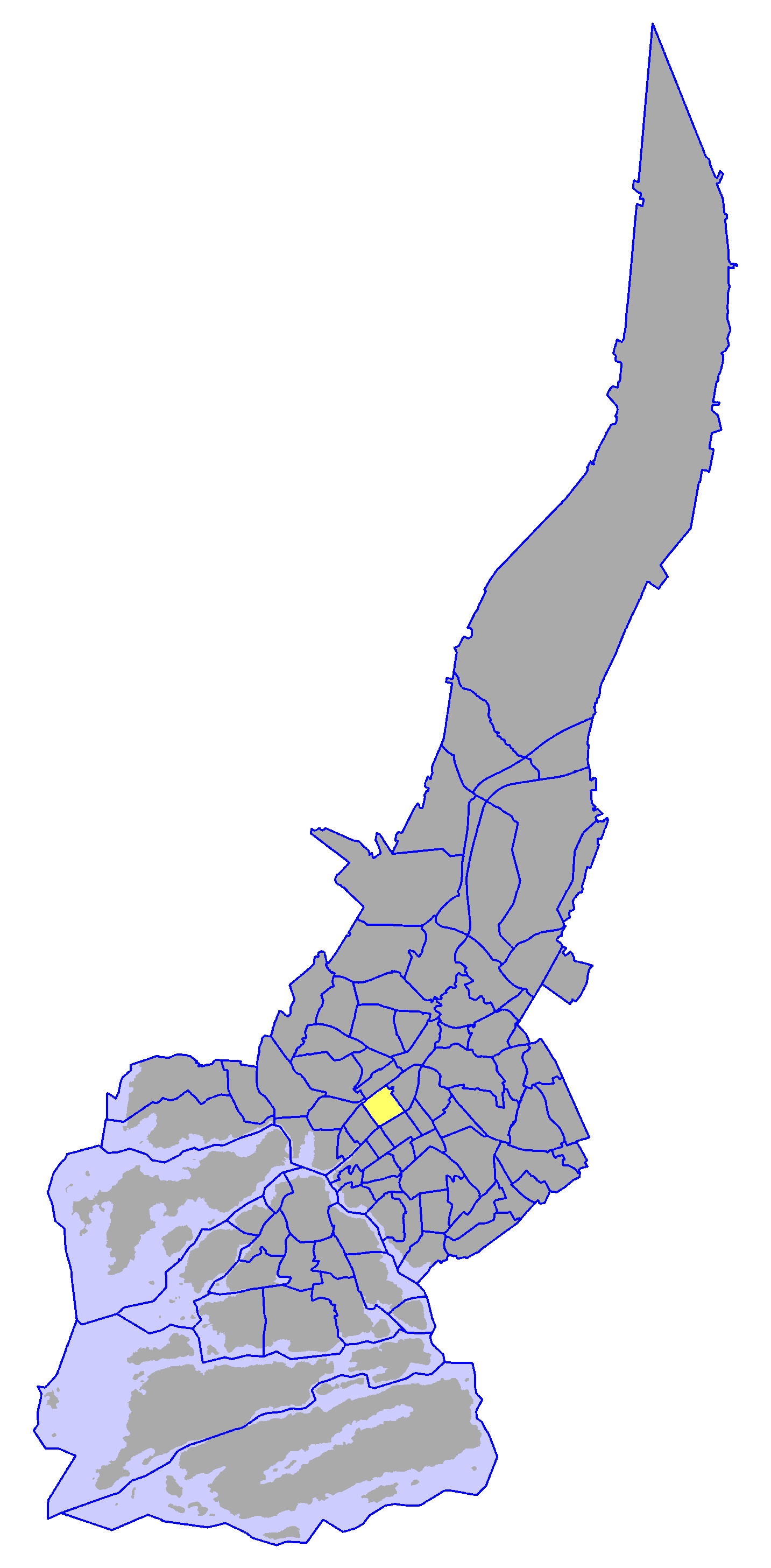
The VII District on a map of Turku.

The VII District is one of the central districts of Turku, Finland. It is located on the west side of the river Aura, between Aurakatu and Puistokatu. Like the neighbouring VI District, it forms part of the city's central business district. The two districts combined host a large proportion of the city's business life, particularly around the Market Square (Kauppatori, part of the VI District). Turku City Hall is located in the VII District, as well as the Turku Central Railway Station.

The district has a population of 8,749 (as of 2004), making it the third largest district in Turku. Its annual population growth rate is 0.46%. 5.06% of the district's population are under 15 years old, while 22.53% are over 65. The district's linguistic makeup is 89.04% Finnish, 8.66% Swedish, and 2.30% other.

== Notable buildings ==
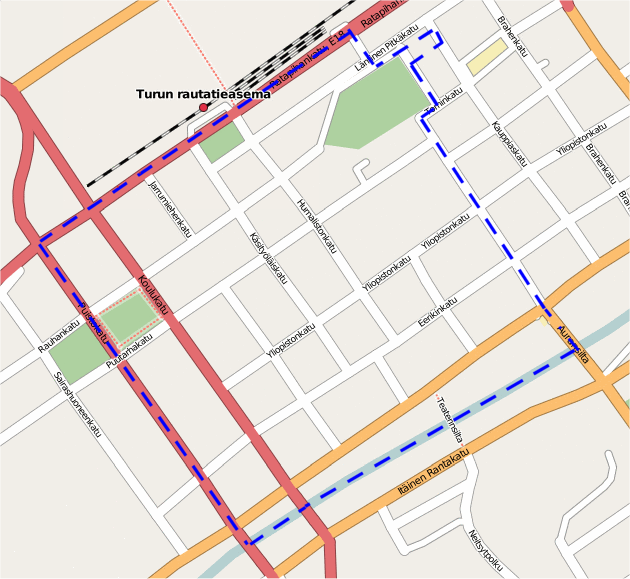
Streetmap of the VII district

- Turun VFD
- Turku City Hall
- Kela building
- Building Control Department
- Southwest Finland Emergency Services
- Turku Market Hall
- Hansa Emporium shopping centre

Churches

- St. Bridget and Blessed Hemming Church
- Betel Church

Schools

- Turun klassillinen lukio
- Puolalanmäki Upper Secondary School
- Snellmanin koulu

== See also ==
- Districts of Turku
- Districts of Turku by population
