= Sokos Wiklund =

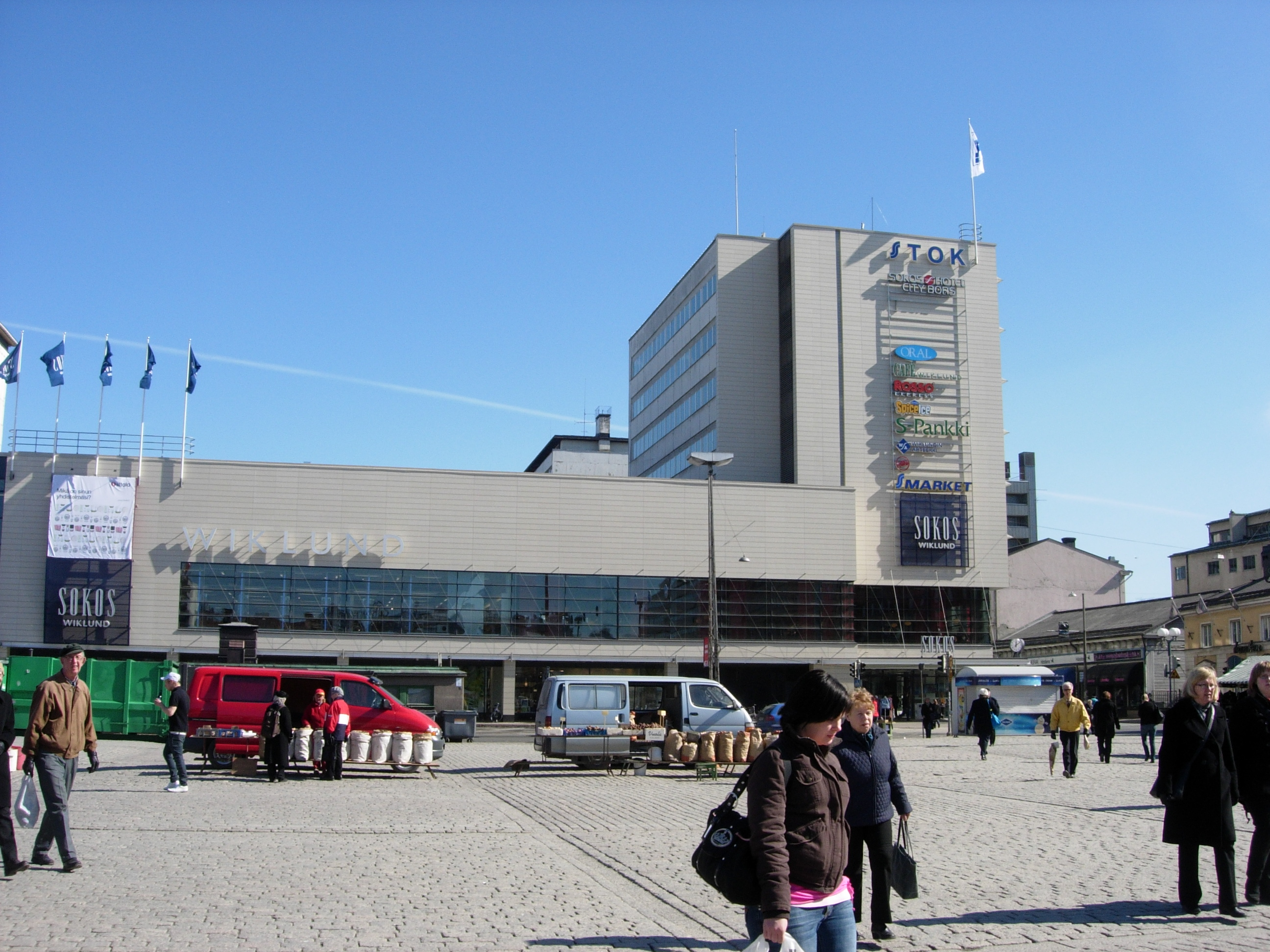
- Wiklund department store seen from the Turku Market Square in 2009.
- Former names: Oy Wiklund Ab
- Alternative names: Wiklund

General information
- Architectural style: Modern architecture
- Location: VI District, Turku, Finland
- Address: Eerikinkatu 11, 20100 Turku
- Coordinates: 60.4519504°N 22.2690557°E
- Named for: Axel Wiklund
- Completed: 1957, 1963
- Owner: Turku Cooperative Society

Design and construction
- Architect(s): Ole & Bertel Gripenberg

Website
- https://www.wiklundturku.fi/ (in Finnish)

Sokos Wiklund is a department store in Turku, Finland. It is owned by the Turku Cooperative Society and is part of the S Group's Sokos chain of department stores.

The name of the department store goes back to Axel Wiklund, a Finnish merchant who established his first hardware store by the Turku Market Square in 1907. The current department store building was completed on the site of the former Lindblom House in 1957, whereas the eight-story tower at the corner of Eerikinkatu and Kauppiaskatu was completed in 1963. Both of the new buildings were designed by Ole & Bertel Gripenberg. The Central Finnish Cooperative Society (SOK) bought the Oy Wiklund Ab department store from the heirs of the Wiklund family in 1958.
