= Turku Synagogue =

Synagogue in Turku, Finland

Turun synagoga
- Finnish: Turun synagoga Swedish: Åbo synagoga
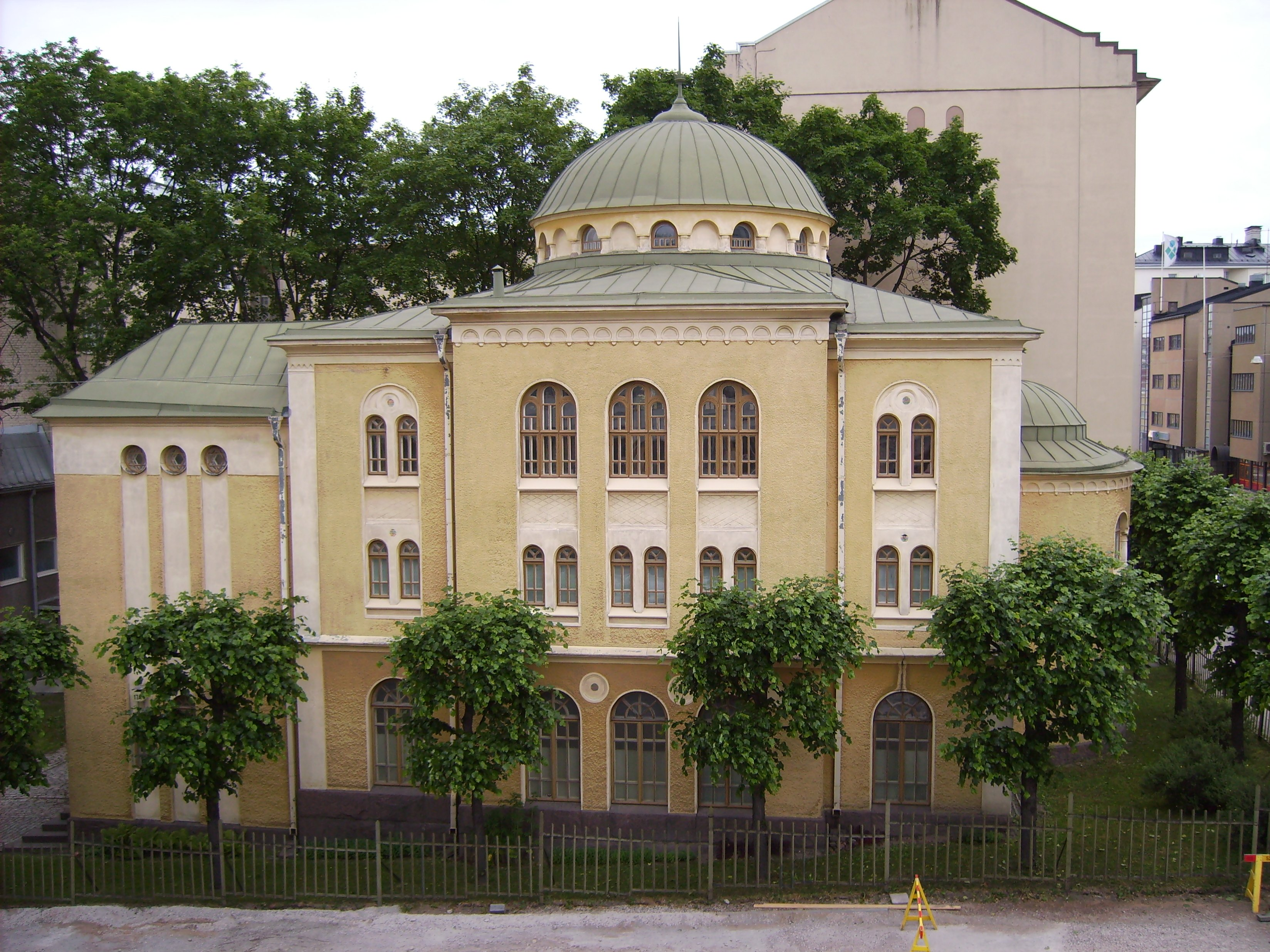
- Synagogue exterior in 2007

- Location of the synagogue in Finland

Religion
- Affiliation: Judaism
- Rite: Nusach Ashkenaz
- Ecclesiastical or organizational status: Synagogue
- Status: Active

Location
- Location: Brahenkatu 17, VII District, Turku
- Country: Finland
- Interactive map of Turun synagoga
- Coordinates: 60°27′20.5″N 022°16′00.0″E

Architecture
- Architects: August Krook; J. E. Hindersson
- Type: Synagogue architecture
- Style: Art Nouveau; Byzantine Revival
- Completed: 1912

Specifications
- Dome: One
- Materials: Brick

Turku Synagogue (Finnish: Turun synagoga, Swedish: Åbo synagoga) is a Jewish synagogue, located in the VII District of Turku, Finland.

The two-storey synagogue with a distinctive domed cupola was designed by architects, August Krook and J.E. Hindersson, in a mixture of the Art Nouveau and Byzantine Revival styles, and was completed in 1912.

== See also ==
- History of the Jews in Finland
