= Kauppatori =

"Kauppatori" is the Finnish word for "market square" and refers to several market squares in Finland:

- The Market Square, Helsinki in central Helsinki.
- The Market Square, Turku in central Turku.
