= Betel Church (Turku) =

- Turun Adventtiseurakunta Betel-kirkko
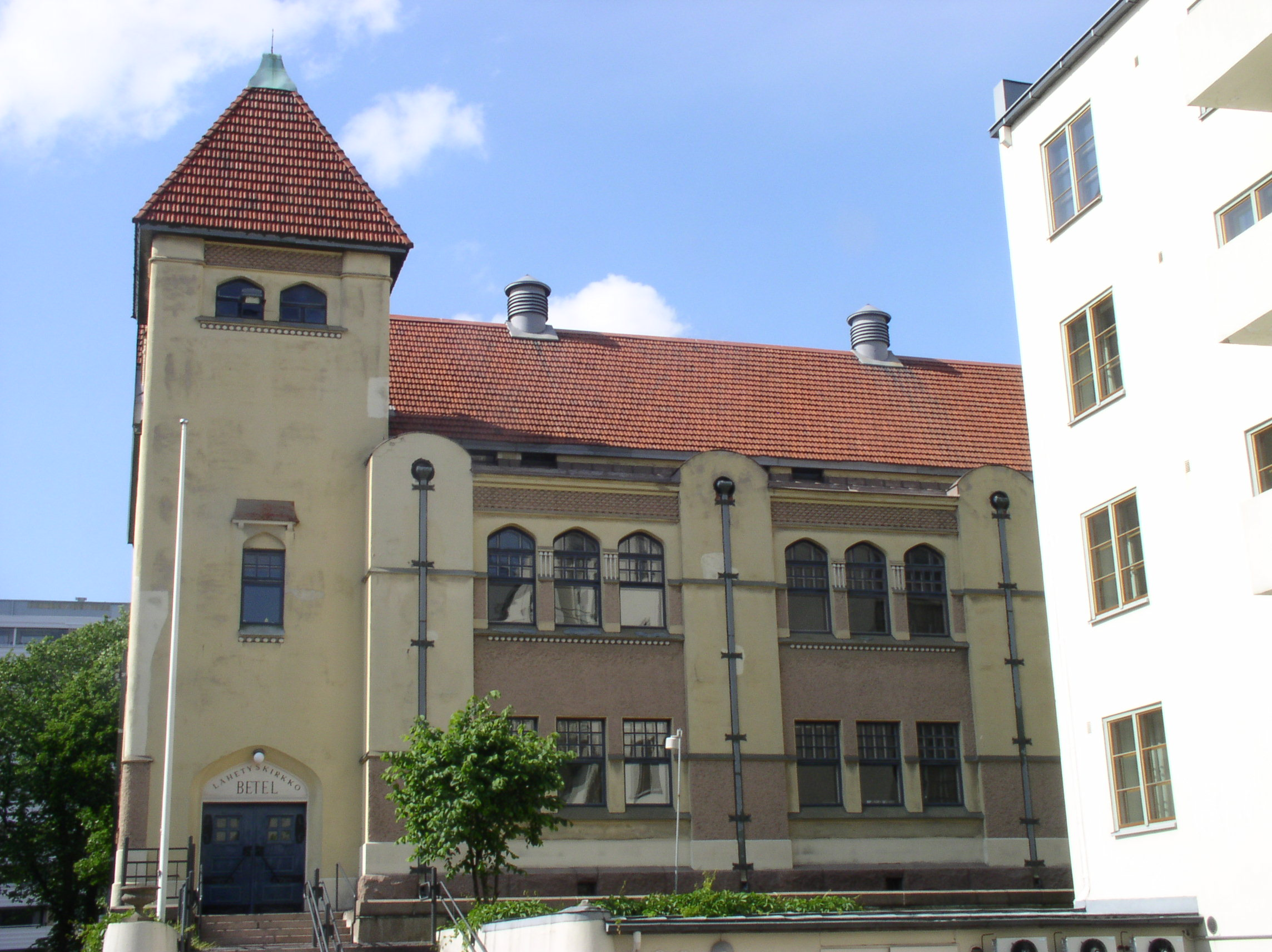
- Betel Church
- 60°27′04″N 22°15′40″E
- Location: Yliopistonkatu 29a, Turku
- Country: Finland
- Denomination: Adventism

History
- Status: Completed

Architecture
- Architect(s): Frithiof Strandell, Erik Bryggman (renovation)
- Architectural type: Jugend, Functionalism
- Completed: 1906, 1927 (renovation)

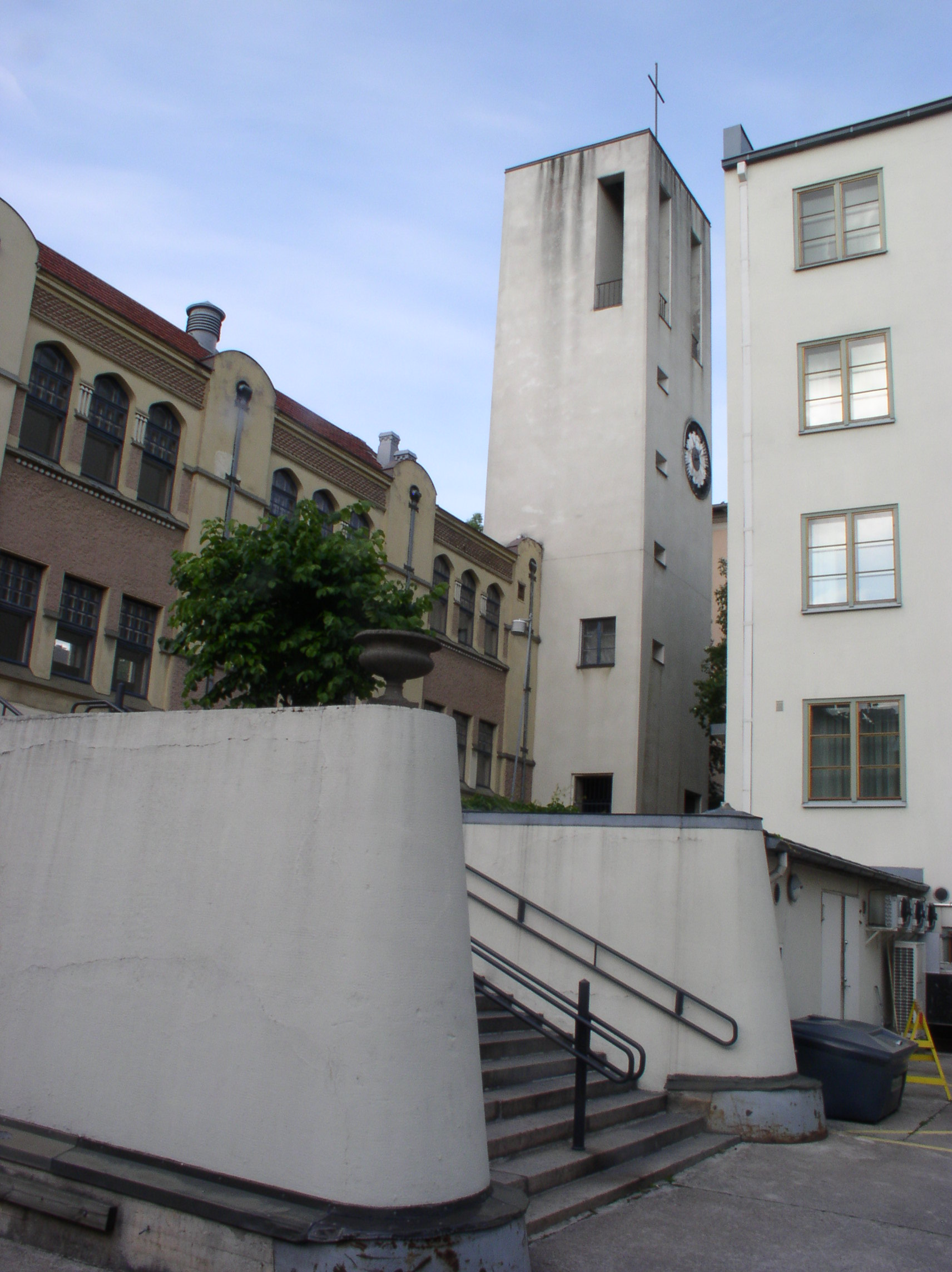
Functional bell tower and stairway

Betel Church (Finnish: Turun Adventtiseurakunta Betel-kirkko, Swedish: Betel-kyrkan) is located in the VII District of Turku, Finland. It is a church of the Turku adventism parish.

The jugend-style church was completed in 1906 under the plans of Frithiof Strandell. It was later renovated under the plans of Erik Bryggman in 1927 and has a functional bell tower, among others.

The church is actually quite hidden from pedestrians. In recent years, there have been suggestions to open up a walkway from Yliopistonkatu to Puutarhakatu for pedestrians and allow them to better admire the church. The Betel Church is listed amongst the most noted buildings of the culture environment in Finland.

In addition to regular services, the church has the vegetarian restaurant KASVIS-ravintola, serving a lunch buffet. The restaurant uses organic and locally grown produce and also has vegan options.

== See also ==
- Adventist Church of Finland
