= Samuel Berner =

German master mason and first city architect of Turku (died 1759)

- Born: Electorate of Saxony
- Died: 10 August 1759; Sjundeå, Finland
- Occupations: Master mason, architect
- Known for: First city architect of Turku; Turku City Hall

Samuel Berner (born in Saxony; died 10 August 1759 in Sjundeå), was a German master mason and the first city architect of Turku (then known as Åbo), Finland. He is considered one of the most significant pioneers of Finnish architecture in the 18th century. His best-known work is the Turku City Hall, built in 1735–1736.

== Biography ==
=== Arrival in Turku ===
Berner was working as a journeyman mason for the city architect of Stockholm when the municipal council (magistrat) of Turku invited him to the city in 1731 to construct a new residence for the president of the Turku Court of Appeal. The local master masons were not considered capable of erecting a large two-storey stone building, and an outside expert was needed. Berner completed the residence and won the confidence of the city's authorities to such a degree that negotiations soon began for the construction of a new city hall.

Already in autumn 1732 Berner presented the council with designs for a new city hall on the main square. He had by then decided to settle in Turku, and contracted his first marriage and purchased a property in the city. He wished first to return to Saxony to settle his affairs, and construction of the city hall began in July 1733.

=== City architect of Turku ===
In spring 1734 Berner's status in the city was formally established. His designs for the city hall were accepted as his master's certificate, he was appointed alderman of the master masons' guild, and he swore both the alderman's oath and the oath of citizenship. The municipal council recorded that, in addition to masonry, Berner was proficient in architectural drawing, architecture, and plasterwork. As city architect he was to oversee the regularity of the city's building, produce drawings for public buildings, and train local craftsmen in his trade.

The foundations of the city hall were laid in 1734 and the main construction carried out in 1735. Interior work was completed in 1736, and the clock tower — manufactured in Stockholm — was installed shortly after the building's inauguration in October 1736. The building survives today, though it was remodelled after the Great Fire of Turku in 1827.

Beyond the city hall, Berner was active on several other projects during his years in Turku. In 1736 he converted the so-called German church and its tower into a library for the Royal Academy of Turku. In 1738 he undertook repair work on the chapter house adjoining Turku Cathedral, and when the cathedral suffered a serious fire that year — destroying the roof and spire — he was appointed the following spring to lead the reconstruction, with responsibility for designing and building a new spire and roof. This work was interrupted in 1742 by the Little Wrath, a Russian occupation of Finland, before the cathedral was complete.

=== Tensions and departure from Turku ===
In 1741, finding himself without sufficient work in Turku, Berner took a position as master mason with the Finnish Brigade of the Fortification Corps, while retaining his ties to the city. The same year the city's other master masons complained to the council that their alderman was neglecting them, and Berner petitioned to be exempted from civic dues as a fortification mason — a request the council rejected. These tensions contributed to his definitive departure from the city in January 1748, when he resigned his citizenship and rejoined the Fortification Corps on a permanent basis as its architect and master mason.

=== Work in Helsinki and Nyland ===
After settling in Helsinki (then Helsingfors), Berner worked on several significant projects. In 1748 he began construction of Pikis Church, completed in 1755, notable for its polygonal apse and richly ornamented brick west gable. He worked on the fortifications of Sveaborg, responsible in 1751 for a vaulted pier in the Liewen curtain wall; when the pier proved defective and had to be demolished, he was dismissed from the Fortification Corps. In 1755 he worked on a school building in Helsinki and began construction of the customs and warehouse building there, a project completed long after his death. He also designed and built a brigade house (later the commandant's house) in Lovisa for the Fortification Corps. He may also have designed and built the Sederholm House, today the oldest surviving building in Helsinki, sometime in the 1750s.

In 1757 Berner was granted citizenship in Helsinki. The following year he declined an invitation to rebuild the spire of Turku Cathedral, citing his age and his move away from the city. Instead, in 1757–1759 he constructed a new Borgå (Porvoo) grammar school building on contract, a stately structure with a mansard roof that survives today as the seat of the Borgå chapter.

=== Death ===
In 1759 Berner undertook his final project, an extension of the medieval church in Kyrkslätt. On his way from Kyrkslätt to Svidja manor in Sjundeå, his horse bolted and he was thrown from the carriage. He died of his injuries a few days later, on 10 August 1759, and was buried in Helsinki three days after.

== Legacy ==
Berner was the first professional in the Finnish building trade to be regarded as an architect, and the first to hold the title of city architect in Finland — a position modelled on the equivalent office established in Stockholm in 1718. His work introduced new stylistic features to Finnish architecture, including the yellow facade colour of the Turku city hall and the broken (mansard) roof with straight gables, which recurs in his buildings in Lovisa and Helsinki. His willingness to employ Gothic forms is evident in the Pikis church, with its polygonal chancel and decorative brick blind arcading on the west gable.

== Family ==
Berner married his first wife, Magdalena Richter, in 1734; she died in 1735. He married his second wife, Margareta Birgitta Ulander, in 1737. One of their sons, Samuel Berner (born 1757), served as a mate in the navy.

== Selected works ==
- Residence of the President of the Turku Court of Appeal, Turku (1731–1733)
- Turku City Hall (1734–1736)
- Library conversion of the German church, Turku (1736)
- Reconstruction of Turku Cathedral spire and roof (begun 1739, interrupted 1742)
- Pikis Church (1748–1755)
- Commandant's House, Lovisa (c. 1755)
- Sederholm House, Helsinki (c. 1750s, attributed)
- Grammar school building, Borgå (1757–1759)
- Extension of Kirkkonummi church (1759, unfinished)
