= Turku Orthodox Church =

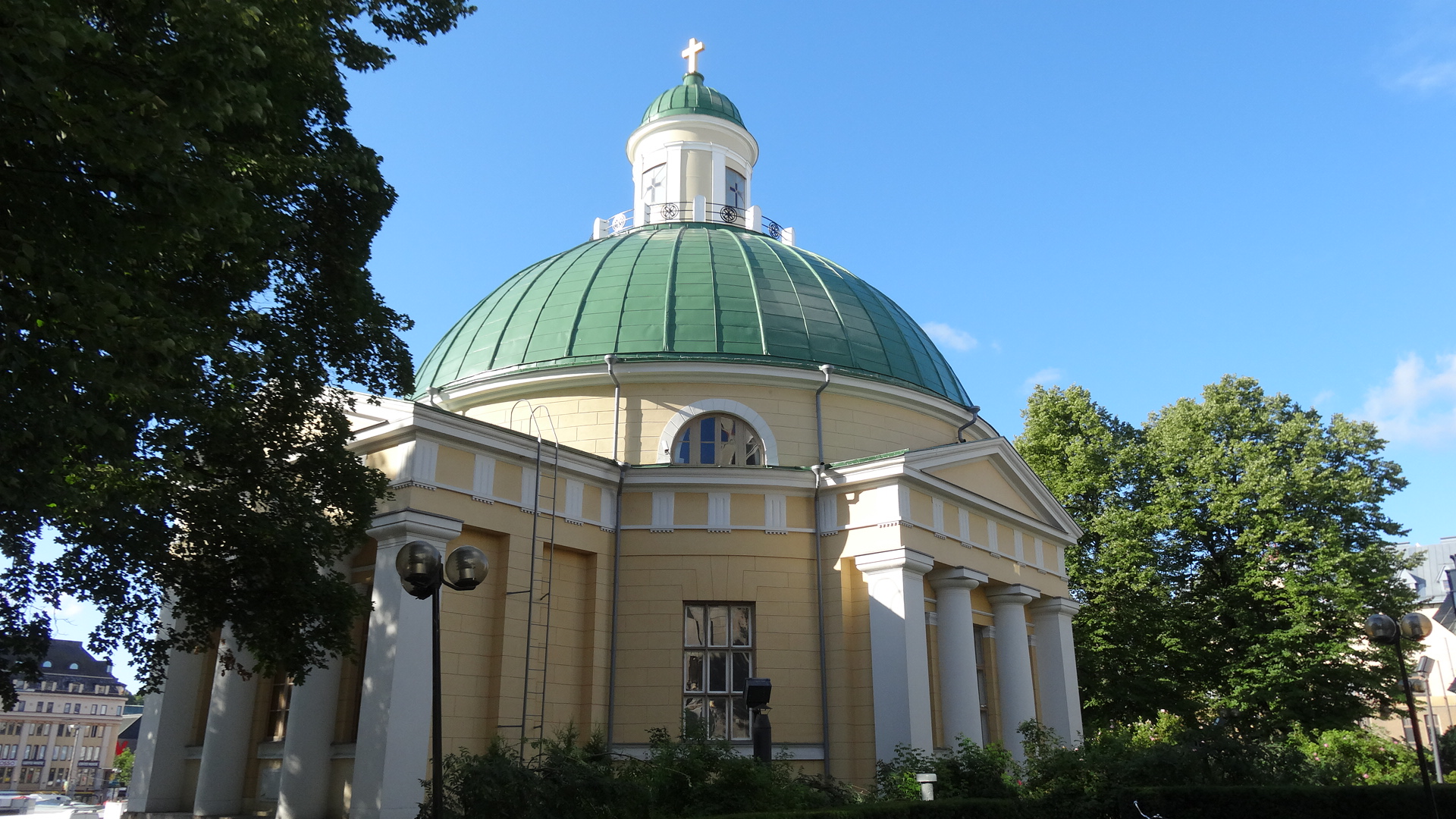
- Turku Orthodox Church
- 60°27′08″N 022°15′58″E
- Location: Turku
- Country: Finland
- Denomination: Eastern Orthodox
- Website: Official website

History
- Status: Completed
- Consecrated: 2 September 1845

Architecture
- Architect: C.L. Engel
- Completed: 1845
- Construction cost: 67,886 rubles

Turku Orthodox Church (Finnish: Turun ortodoksinen kirkko, Swedish: Åbo ortodoxa kyrka) or the Church of the Holy Martyr Empress Alexandra (Finnish: Pyhän marttyyrikeisarinna Aleksandran kirkko; Swedish: Heliga martyrkejsarinnan Aleksandras kyrka; Greek: Ορθόδοξη εκκλησία της Αγίας Αλεξάνδρας, Orthódoxi ekklisía tis Agías Alexándras) is the main church of the Turku Orthodox parish located at the northwest corner of the Turku Market Square along the Yliopistonkatu street in Turku, Finland. The church was built under plans drafted by architect Carl Ludvig Engel and was ordered by Nicholas I of Russia on 5 January 1838. Construction, which began in 1839, cost 67,886 rubles and was completed in 1845. The church was consecrated on 2 September 1845. The church was dedicated to Alexandra, the spouse of Diocletian who had publicly become Christianised and suffered a martyr's death on 23 April 303. The choice of patron saint may have been due to Nicholas I's wife's name, Aleksandra Feodorovna.

Most of the icons of the iconostasis come from Valaam Monastery.

The Turku Orthodox church cemetery and cemetery chapel are located in Vasaramäki and there are other parish sanctuaries in Rauma and Salo.

== Damage ==
The church has been sinking since before the 2000s. It needs repairs that will cost several million euros. The church parish blames the city, arguing that the construction of an underground parking garage lowered the groundwater and accelerated the sinking. The parish points to an agreement from 2000 where the city promised to cover construction damages, but the city rejected their claim. The parish is planning to take the city to court to pay.

== Gallery ==
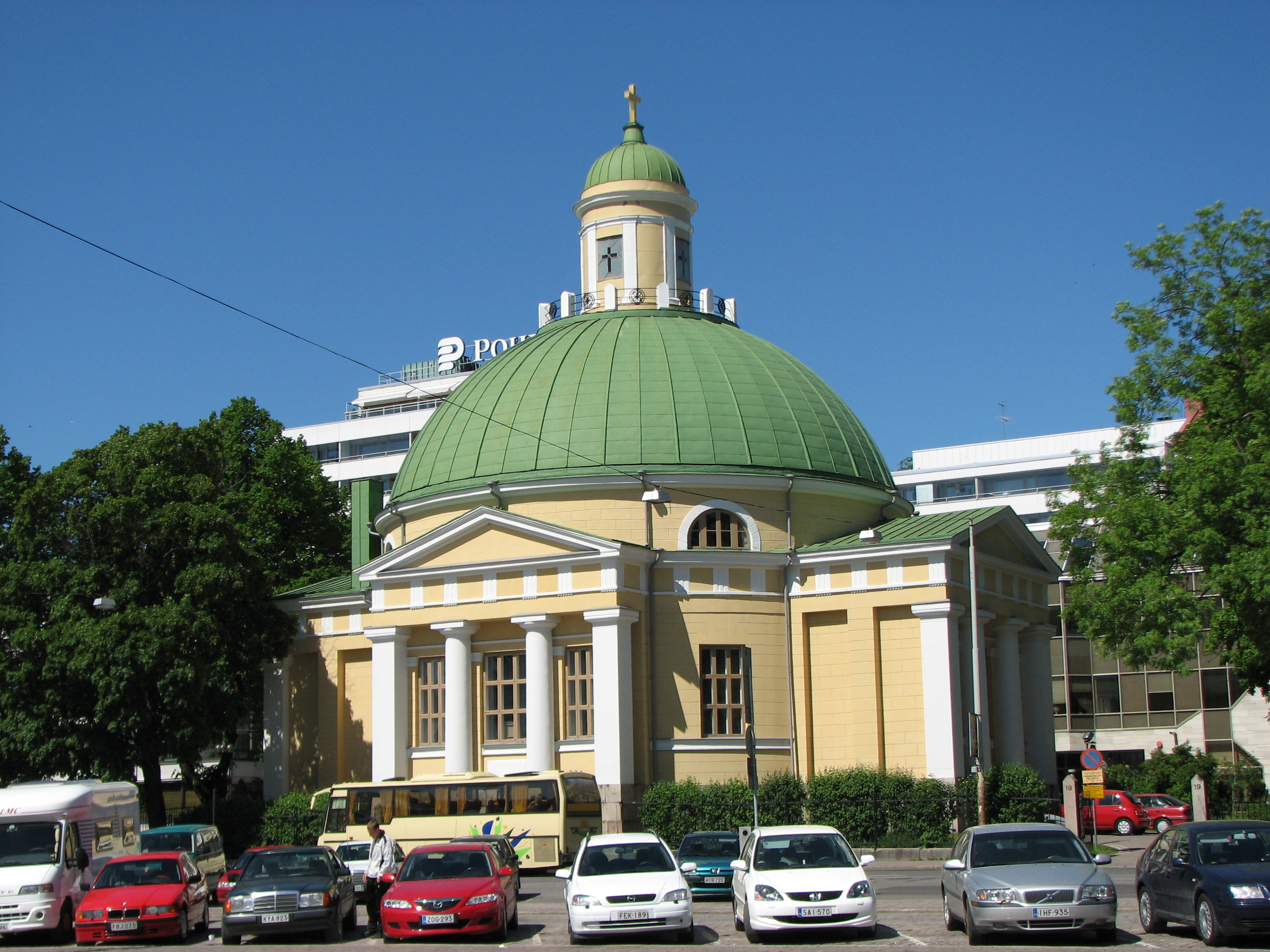
Turku Orthodox Church

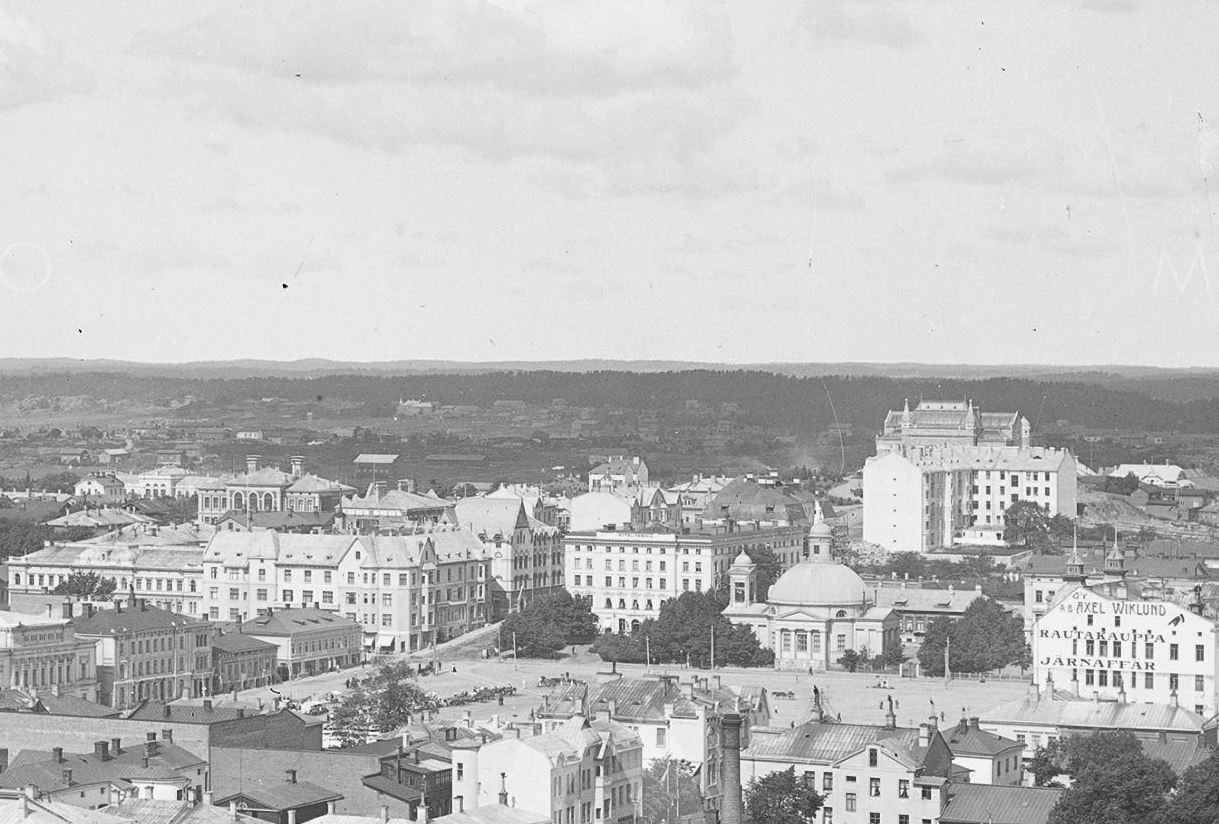
Turku Orthodox Church in 1909

== See also ==
- Finnish Orthodox Church
