= Phoenix Hotel, Turku =

Hotel and university building in Turku, Finland

Phoenix Hotel
- Hotelli Phoenix
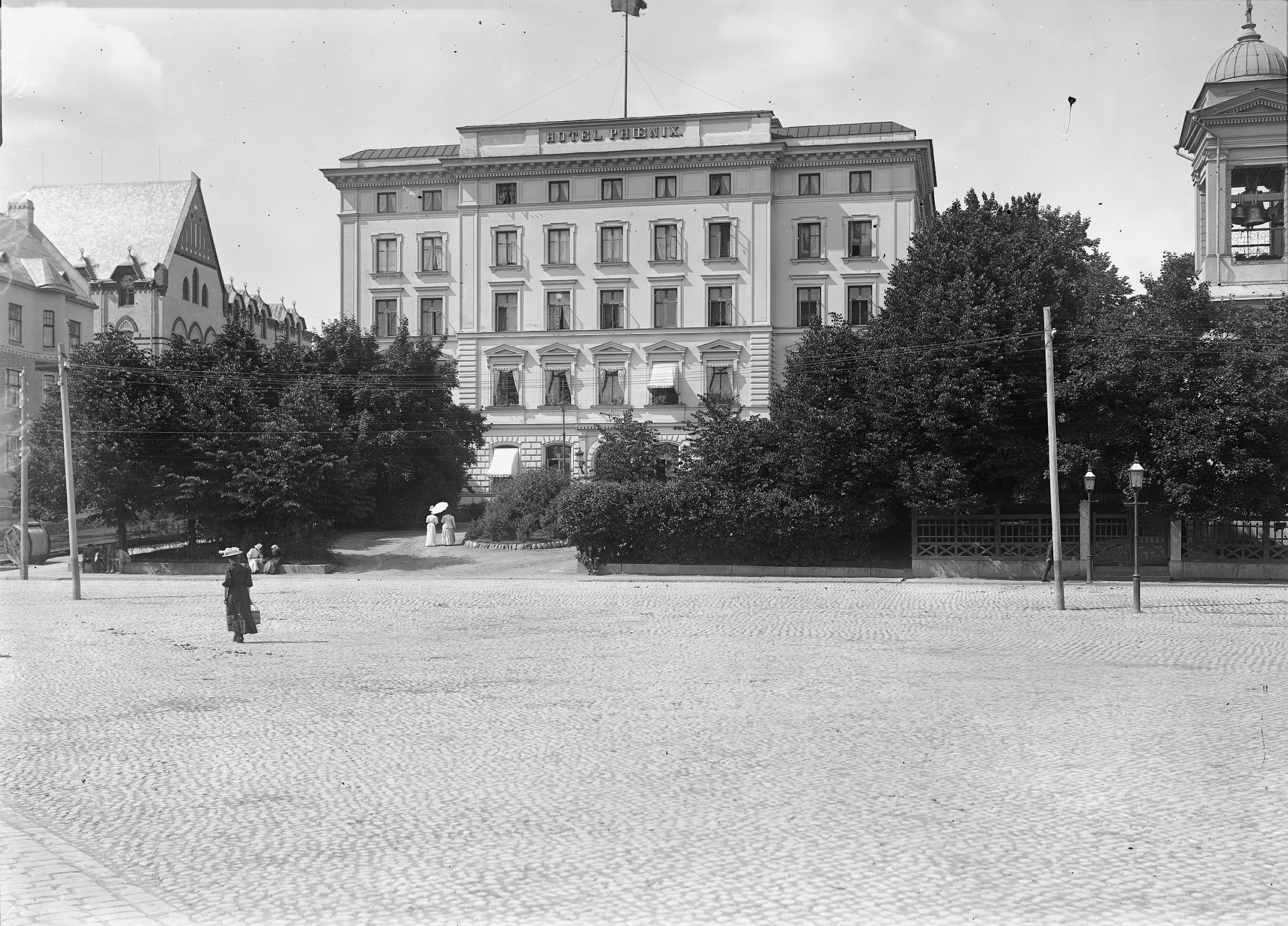
- The Phoenix Hotel in 1908
- Interactive map of the Phoenix Hotel area

General information
- Location: Yliopistonkatu 21 – Aurakatu 7, Turku, Turku, Finland
- Coordinates: 60°27′08″N 022°15′55″E
- Completed: 1878
- Opened: 1878
- Closed: 1922
- Demolished: 1959

Design and construction
- Architects: Axel and Hjalmar Kumlien

The Phoenix Hotel was a hotel located in Turku, Finland, on the edge of the Market Square along the street Venäjän Kirkkokatu (now Yliopistonkatu), which operated from 1878 to 1922. The building was known as the Phoenix House even when it was the main building of the private University of Turku, founded in 1920. The Phoenix House was demolished in 1959.

== Hotel ==
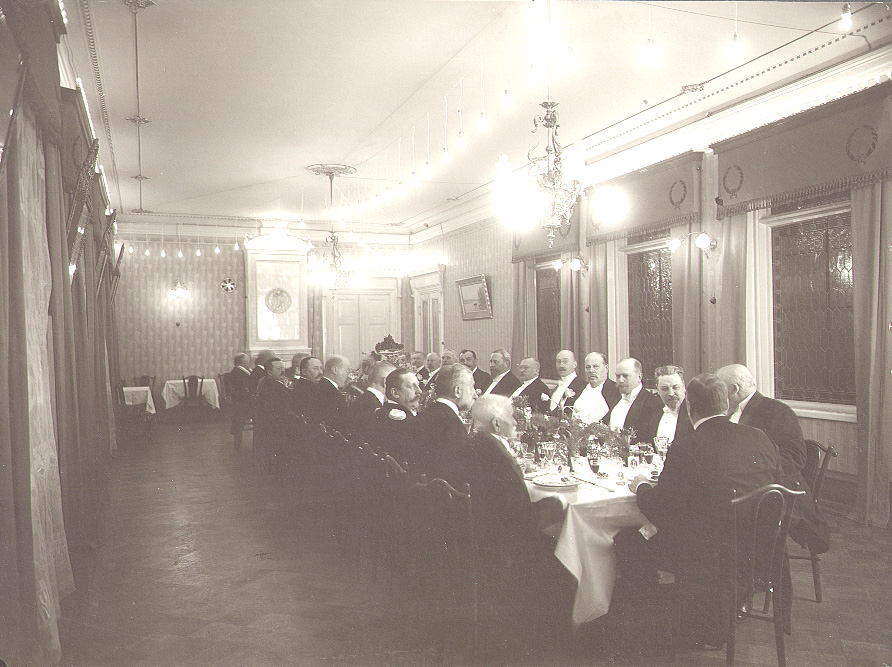
Interior of the hotel, circa 1900

The colossal Phoenix Hotel building, designed by architects Axel and Hjalmar Kumlien, was completed in 1878, the same year the hotel began operations. The cost of construction was about 50 percent over the initial estimate. The upper class of Turku, who founded the hotel, believed that the railway just built in Turku would increase transit traffic between Russia and Western Europe and that the hotel restaurant, ballroom and one hundred guest rooms would be used. However, this did not happen and the hotel was in financial difficulties for the first four years. The change of ownership made the hotel barely profitable. Perhaps the most notable guest staying at the hotel was former U.S. President Ulysses S. Grant, who visited the hotel soon after its completion. The famous scammer Ruben Oskar Auervaara served as the hotel's bellhop in his youth. Phoenix Hotel ceased operations in 1922.

== As a university ==
The private Finnish University of Turku was founded in 1920 after an extensive fund-raising campaign. The Turku Finnish University Society acquired the building in 1920 as the main building of the university. The arrangement was intended to be temporary but ultimately lasted 36 years. One notable resident of the Phoenix house during this period was the renowned lichenologist Edvard August Vainio, who moved to Turku in 1922 after accepting a position at the university.

With the help of the university, the street Kirkkokatu ("church street") was renamed as Yliopistonkatu. ("university street"). The Phoenix House became cramped, but it was not until a substantial donation in the late 1940s by gold prospector Karl Fredrik Joutsen that new premises could be acquired for the university. The buildings designed by architect Aarne Ervi were completed on Vesilinnanmäki (Ryssänmäki) in the 1950s, when the Phoenix House was left empty. Attempts were made to find a new owner for the house, and it was also offered to the city of Turku. However, the city council blocked the deal, preferring a solution that benefitted the construction industry.

== Demolition and lightning house ==
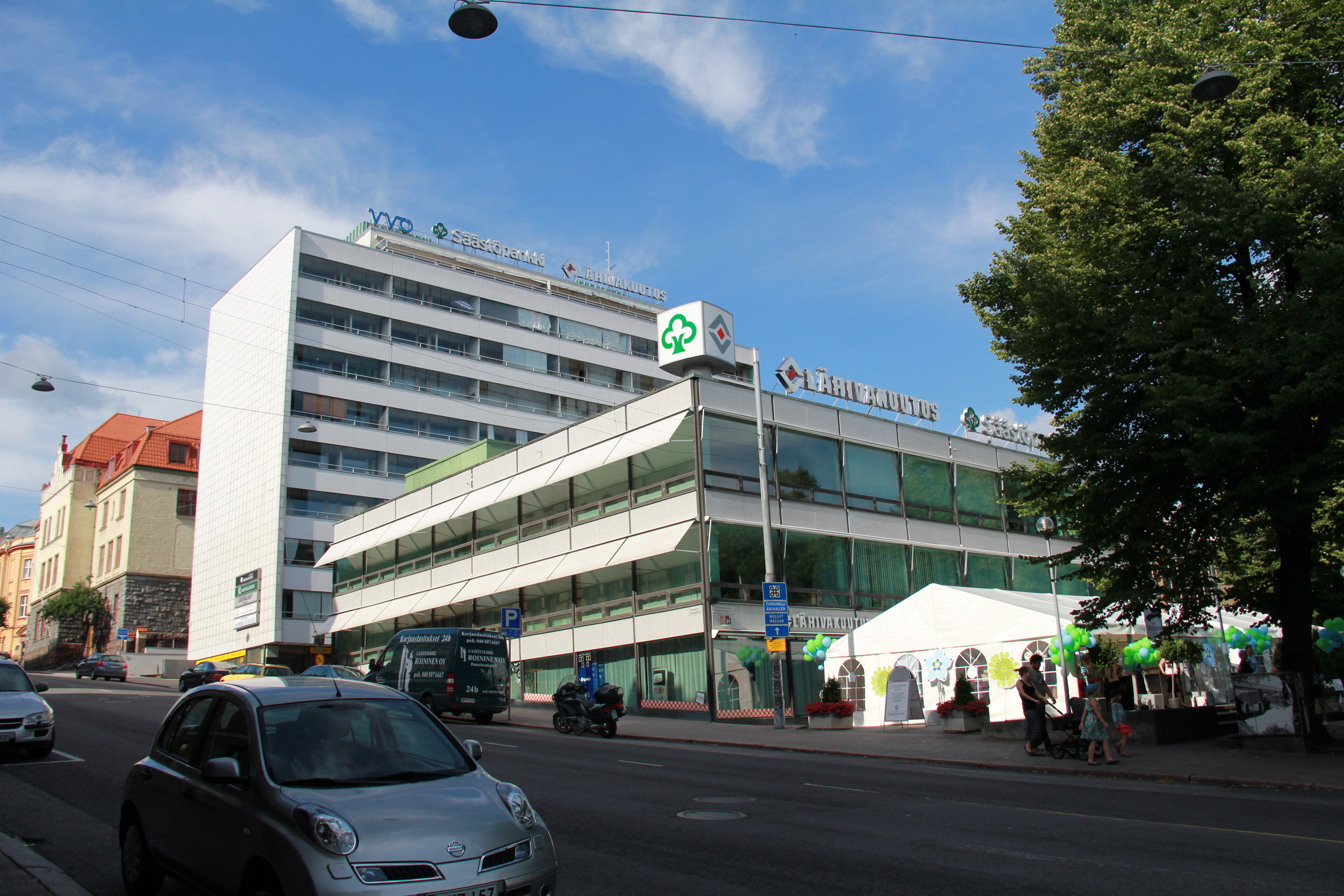
The Salamankulma apartment building (left) and office wing (right), completed in 1961, occupy the former location of the Phoenix Hotel.

The building, which was considered to be in poor condition, was eventually taken over by the insurance company Salama and demolished by blasting in 1959.

A residential and commercial building, Asunto Oy Salamankulma, was built on the site and was completed in 1961. Salamankulma was designed by architects Matti Hakala and Aarne Nuortila and assisted by Sakari Kauria, an architecture student. The building has two parts: a low three-story business wing and a ten-story residential building behind it. Insurance companies Pohjola and Suomi-Salama have been operating in the low-rise since 1977.

== Phoenix library ==
The main library of the University of Turku on Yliopistonmäki was renamed the Phoenix Library in 2015 in connection with the renovation. The chairs in the library reading room are from the original Phoenix building.
