= Skanssi (shopping centre) =

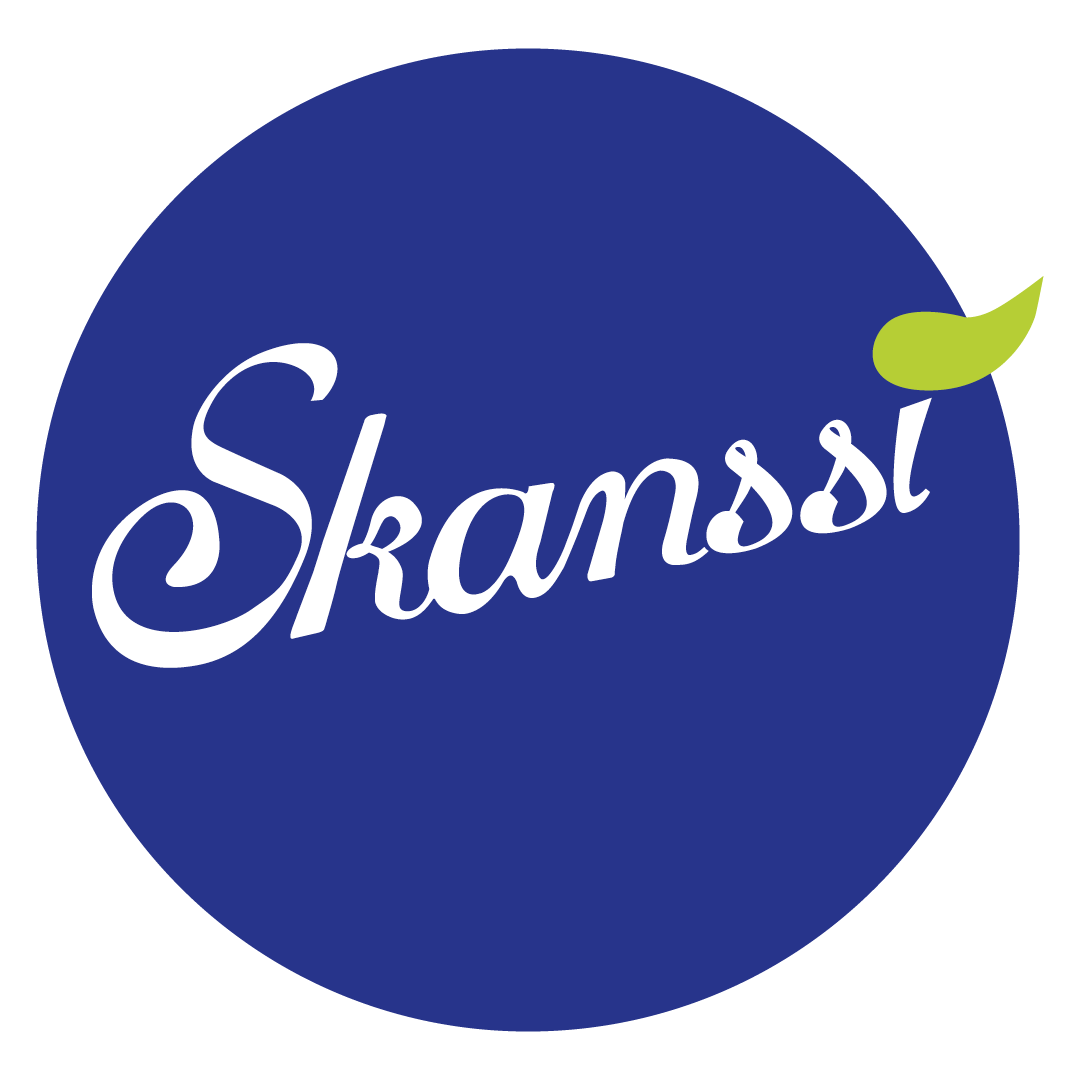

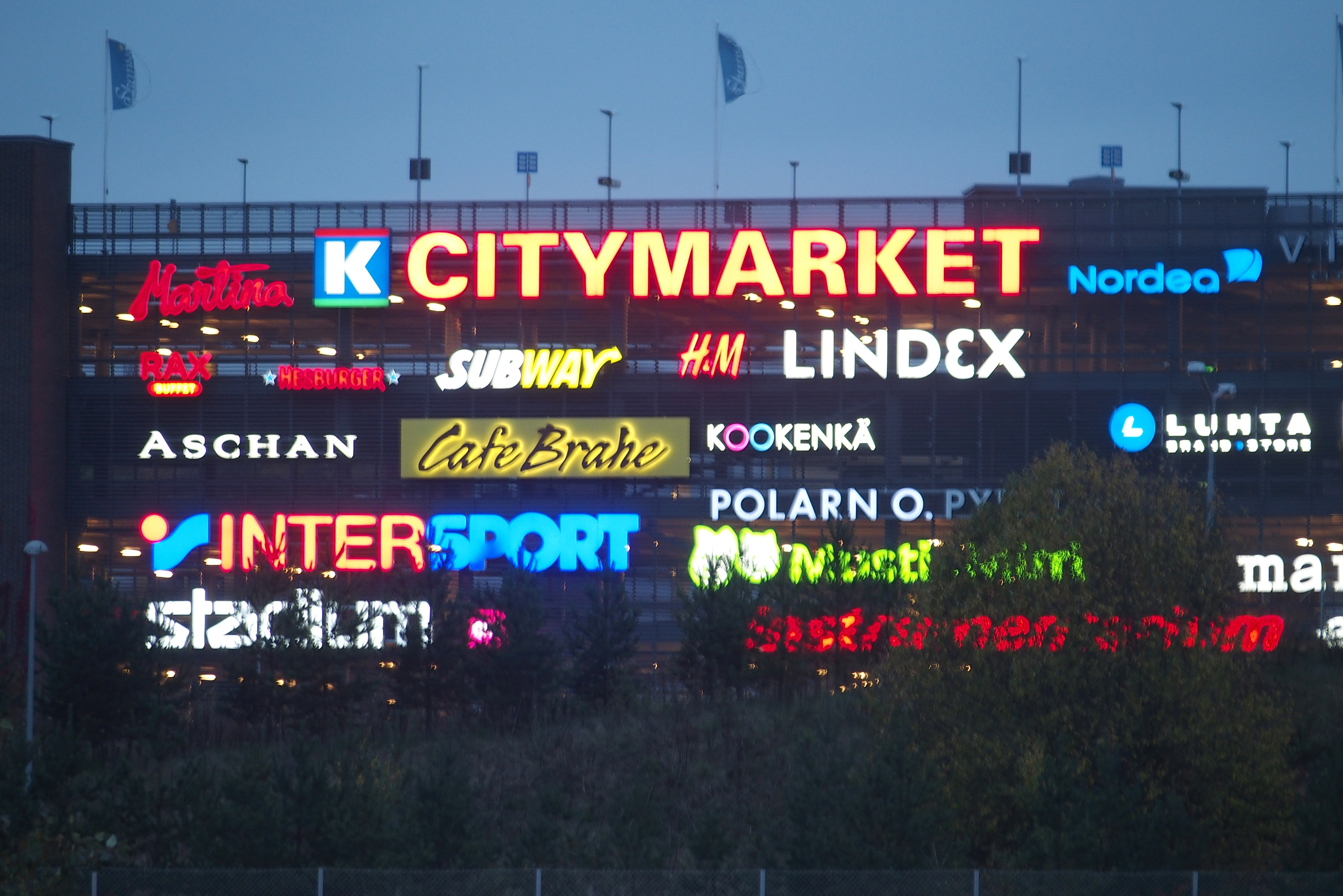
- Skanssi in 2017
- Location: Skanssi, Turku, Finland
- Coordinates: 60°25.806′N 22°19.282′E
- Address: Skanssinkatu 10
- Opened: April 17, 2009
- Owner: ESCF II Finland Holding Oy
- Architect: Arkkitehtitoimisto Pekka Helin & Co Oy
- Num. of stores: about 100
- Num. of anchor tenants: 6
- Floor area: 37,000 m²
- Floors: 2
- Parking: 2,400
- Website: www.skanssi.fi/welcome

Skanssi is a shopping center located in the Skanssi district of Turku, Finland. It is located along Highway 1 (E18) near the Kaarina town and the distance to the center of Turku is about 4 kilometres (2.5 mi). The shopping center was inaugurated on April 17, 2009, and it is the second largest shopping center in the Turku region.

The shopping center has a gross floor area of 130,000 square meters and a leasable area of 40,000 square meters. It has parking space for 2,500 cars. The mall has about 100 stores, with six anchor stores including K-Citymarket, H&M, Stadium, Intersport, Clas Ohlson and XXL Sports & Outdoor.

== Awards ==
In 2019, the Skanssi shopping center was awarded the Best Marketing Campaign of the Year award by the Nordic Council of Shopping Centers (NCSC) Finland Awards. Skanssi won the best marketing campaign category with its 2018 summer campaign. In 2019, the Trade Committee of the Turku Chamber of Commerce awarded the Trade of the Year award to Skanssi. The award was given for taking responsibility from the construction stage onwards and for communicating it systematically. At the beginning of 2019, the Finnish Shopping Center Association awarded Skanssi with the Trade of the Year award. The award was given to Skanssi for rebranding its brand image.

== See also ==
- Hansa (shopping centre)
- Mylly
