= Skanssi =

City district in Turku, Finland

Coordinates: 60°25′45″N 22°19′30″E

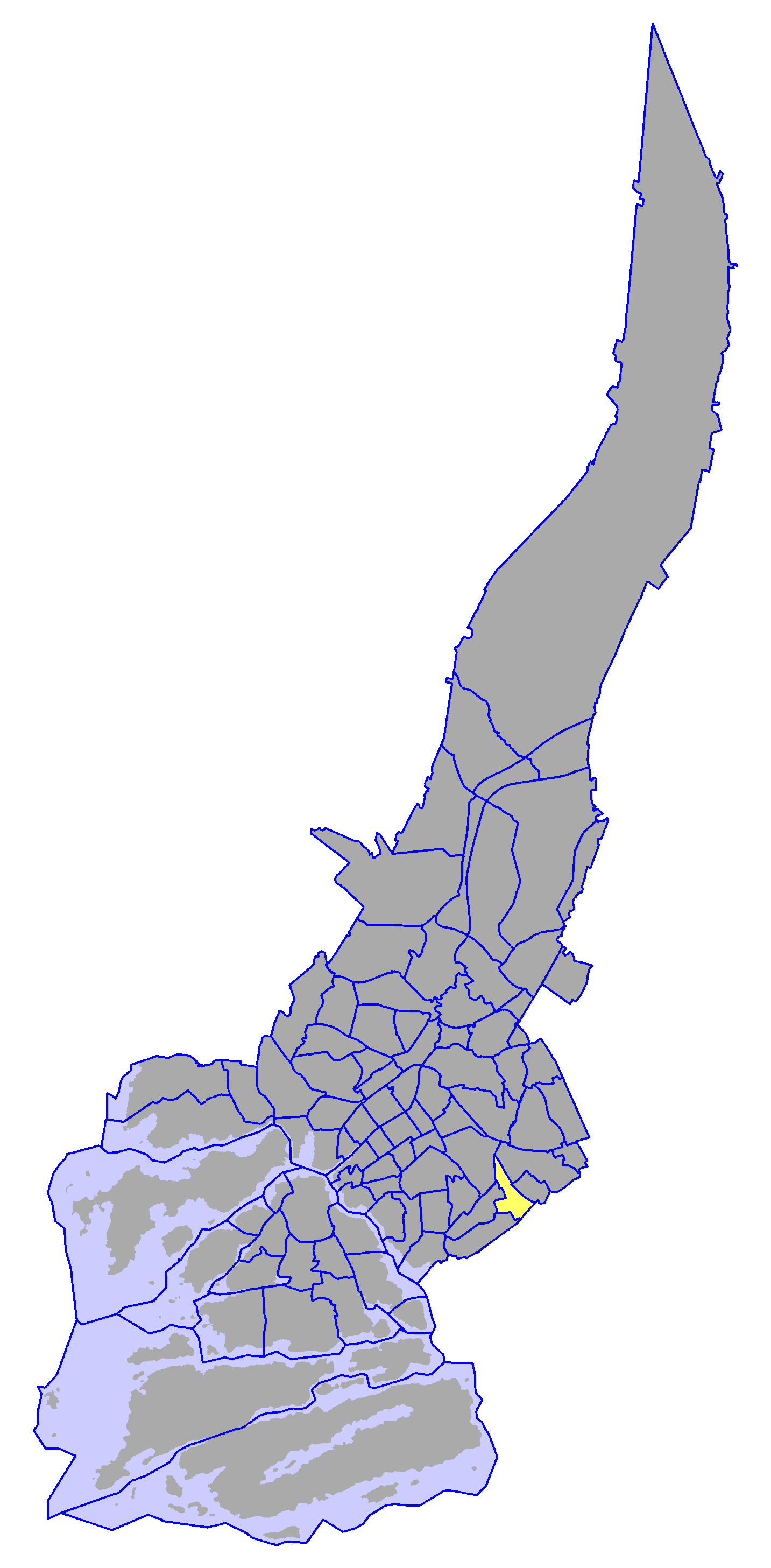
Skanssi on a map of Turku

Skanssi (Finnish; Skansen in Swedish) is a district in the Uittamo-Skanssi ward of the city of Turku, in Finland. It is in the southeast of the city, and consists mostly of industrial areas. Skanssi is the location of Turku's biggest mall complex.

The current (as of 2004) population of Skanssi is 141, and it is increasing at an annual rate of 5.67%. 17.73% of the district's population are under 15 years old, while 22.70% are over 65. The district's linguistic makeup is 93.62% Finnish and 6.38% Swedish.

== See also ==
- Skanssi (shopping centre)
- Districts of Turku
- Districts of Turku by population
