= Ruben Oskar Auervaara =

Finnish conman and thief (1906–1964)

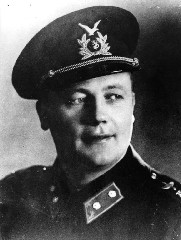
Ruben Oskar Auervaara in uniform.

Ruben Oskar Auervaara (until 1935 Jansson, from 1952 to 1959 Risto Oskari Karnas, from 1959 Erik Kristian Jansson, born 4 September 1906 – died 26 May 1964) was a notorious Finnish conman and thief. He became famous by cheating money from women he met through newspaper announcements, by pretending to intend to marry them. His surname has become an archetypal name in the Finnish language, meaning a deceptive charming trickster.

Auervaara spent 26 years of life in various prisons.

== Biography ==
Ruben Oskar Jansson was born in Turku to the Rettig factory serviceman Johannes Jansson and his wife Anna Karlsson. In his youth he worked as a bellboy at the Phoenix Hotel. After finishing elementary school, he was sent to the Kotiniemi schooling facility in Vilppula because of his bad manners, where he escaped from multiple times. After turning to petty crime Jansson was sent to prison for the first time already at the age of 16. In 1935 he changed his surname from Jansson to Auervaara and started his career as conman, deceiving women. In his deception he used multiple false names. He was sent to prison multiple times, for a total of 26 years.

Auervaara sought women as his victims with newspaper announcements and tried to steal everything he could from them. He strengthened his contacts with staged photographs. Auervaara would for example have his picture taken in a pilot's uniform, in front of some unknown person's car claiming it was his own, or playing a hotel piano where he claimed the hotel entrance hall and piano belonged to a mansion he owned. He was sentenced for deceiving twenty women. Of the women who responded to his announcements, Auervaara chose those who he thought were the wealthiest and easiest to deceive as his victims. Many of his victims had an academic education. The trials related to the event caused great public attention in the press in the 1940s and the 1950s.

Unto Parvilahti tells in his book Berijan tarhat that he had met Auervaara at the Helsinki County Prison in Katajanokka in autumn 1944. According to Parvilahti, Auervaara was a "diminutive, rather worthless-looking man", so "in regard of his appearance, it is hard to believe he achieved such success with the ladies". On the other hand, according to Parvilahti, Auervaara was "constantly happy and had his way with words". He mentions having made only one exception in his behaviour with Auervaara: as he, unlike other prisoners, had access to a typewriter in his cell, he was often asked to write applications and other documents for other prisoners, which he always declined. However, he mentions having agreed to write out the defence document Auervaara had designed for himself: he was interested to see how the charming conman would defend himself. Parvilahti kept the content of this document to himself, but mentions having wondered how bad Auervaara's handwriting and grasp of the Finnish grammar was, even though he had made successful contacts by exchanging letters. In return for the writing work, Auervaara cleaned Parvilahti's cell and gave him cigars and flower bouquets. According to Parvilahti, the bouquets came from women Auervaara had deceived, who "could not forget their charmer - as the love of a woman is forgiving!"

Auervaara became a celebrity in January 1945, when the criminal investigation unit of the police published his photograph and an announcement asking his victims to report themselves in the country's largest newspapers. Later, the justice psychiatrist diagnosed Auervaara as a psychopath. Auervaara was a skilled actor, but he had poor self-control and as a psychopath, his emotional life was underdeveloped. The deputy prison psychiatrist said in his statement in 1956 that Auervaara was

"one of those vain and delusional psychopaths, whose stamina and abilities are not enough to satisfy their need of advertising themselves, but who instead in their attempt to seek the shortest road to expansion, turn to crime and whose mythomania comes more from a need to advertise themselves than a real need for monetary value." (O. Keyriläinen, deputy prison psychiatrist of the Turku Country Prison)

When free from prison, Auervaara spent much of his time in the archipelago.

On his way to mental health examination, Auervaara escaped to Sweden, where he continued his deception. He was soon caught again and was sent to prison, where he attempted to escape three times, failing each time. After serving his punishment he was sent back to Finland, where he had to serve his remaining sentence. He later changed his name and published a memoir book called Nainen on kohtaloni ("The woman is my fate"). Auervaara - now called Karnas - continued his deception and was charged with manslaughter after one of his victims had committed suicide. In 1956 he was sentenced to forced labour as a dangerous criminal, but he was only charged with attempted betrayal. According to criminologist Timo Kautto, the events that had led to suicide were seen by the court as so grave that Auervaara had to serve his sentence in isolation. The court viewed Auervaara as a danger to public safety.

After Auervaara was released from prison in 1959 he took back his original surname Jansson and finally married for real. Although Auervaara at this point apparently tried to change his manners for real, he was arrested again for deception in marriage in spring 1964. On 27 May 1964 Auervaara was found in the incarceration cell of the criminal unit of the Helsinki police having hanged himself. He is thought to have hanged himself because he was afraid of going to prison again. Some people think that other criminals, embittered towards Auervaara, killed him and staged the death as a suicide.

== Reputation ==
In the press, the word "auervaara" has become a term used occasionally in reports of crimes where women are tricked into promises of marriage. It has also further led to the word "auervaarailu" (being, doing or making an auervaara), which is an old-fashioned term for tricking women.

According to the doctor general of the psychiatric prison hospital of Finland, docent Hannu Lauerma, Auervaara often played a sort of inexperienced, timid boy to the women and told them he was shy and afraid of women. This way Auervaara appealed to the women's sense of affection and pretended to throw himself at their mercy. Auervaara's way of deception was a natural talent, which he refined through experience.

Auervaara has been seen as the inspiration of the 1945 play Gabriel, tule takaisin ("Gabriel, come back") by Mika Waltari, which is about a conman chasing the money of old virgins and widows. At the time Waltari wrote the play Auervaara was however relatively unknown. However, in his memoirs Nainen on kohtaloni Auervaara himself views himself as the inspiration of Waltari's play. Auervaara goes so far as to deny being so heartless as Waltari portrays him as.

Veikko Lavi has composed, written and recorded a song "Gabriel" about the event. Auervaara was the butt of jokes also in some cuplés by Reino Helismaa, such as "Oli mulla ennen" ("Oli mulla ennen heilakin, mut enää ole ei / Minulta jo ennen sotia sen Auervaara vei") and "Missä, milloin ja miten vaan" ("Oon herrasmies ja milloinkaan en naisiin kajoa / ja Auervaaran asteelle en koskaan vajoa"). Sauvo Puhtila's Finnish translation of the Swedish Eurovision song Kevätauer (Sol och vår) also has a line that can be heard either as "kun kevätauer vaarat tuo" ("when the spring mist brings danger") or "kun kevät Auervaarat tuo" ("when the spring brings Auervaaras").

== See also ==
- Minna Craucher

== Literature ==
- Auervaara, Ruben Oskar: Nainen oli kohtaloni. Hämeenlinna, 1953.
- Kautto, Timo: Auervaara: Aurinko- ja kevätmies. Helsinki: Edita, 1999. ISBN 951-37-2800-5.
