= Adventist Church of Finland =

Christian religious community in Finland

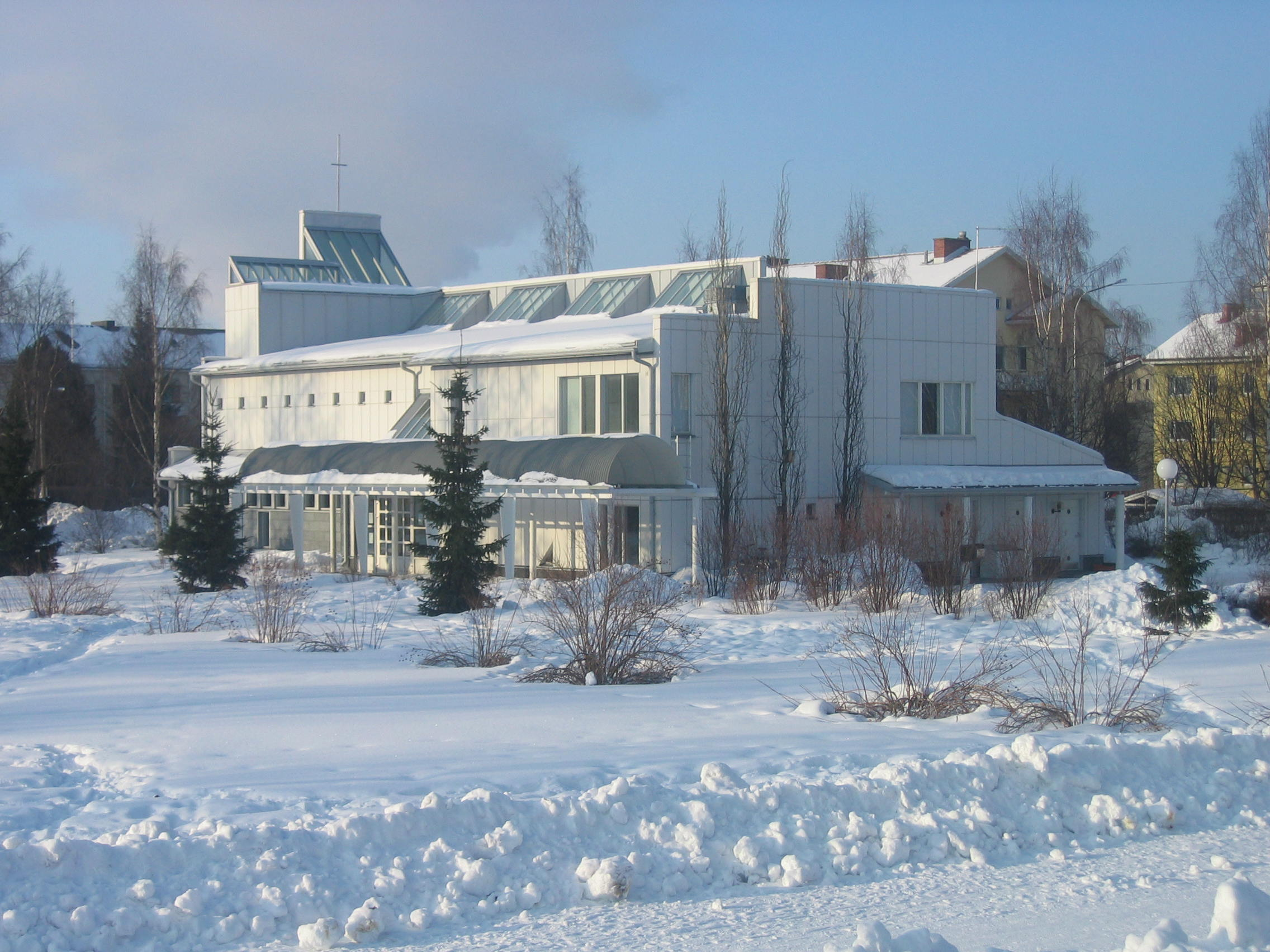
The adventist church of Karjasilta, Oulu, Finland

The Adventist Church of Finland (Finnish: Suomen adventtikirkko) is a Protestant Christian religious community that began operating in Finland in 1892. In 2017, it had about 4,700 members, and more than 60 parishes.

Adventism arrived in Finland from the United States via Sweden in the early 1890s. Adventism initially gained a foothold among the Swedish-speaking population. The movement became an association in 1920, when the Finnish Seventh-day Adventist Philanthropists' Association (Finnish: Suomen Seitsemännen Päivän Adventistien Filantrooppienn yhdistys) was registered. The strongest area of the movement in the 1920s was Turku and Pori with their surroundings; the best known of these is the Turku Adventist Parish, also known as the Betel Church. Swedish-speaking Adventists formed their own organization in the late 1920s.
