= St. Paul's Church, Stockholm =

Church in Södermalm, Stockholm, Sweden

Coordinates: 59°19′3.67″N 18°3′43.51″E

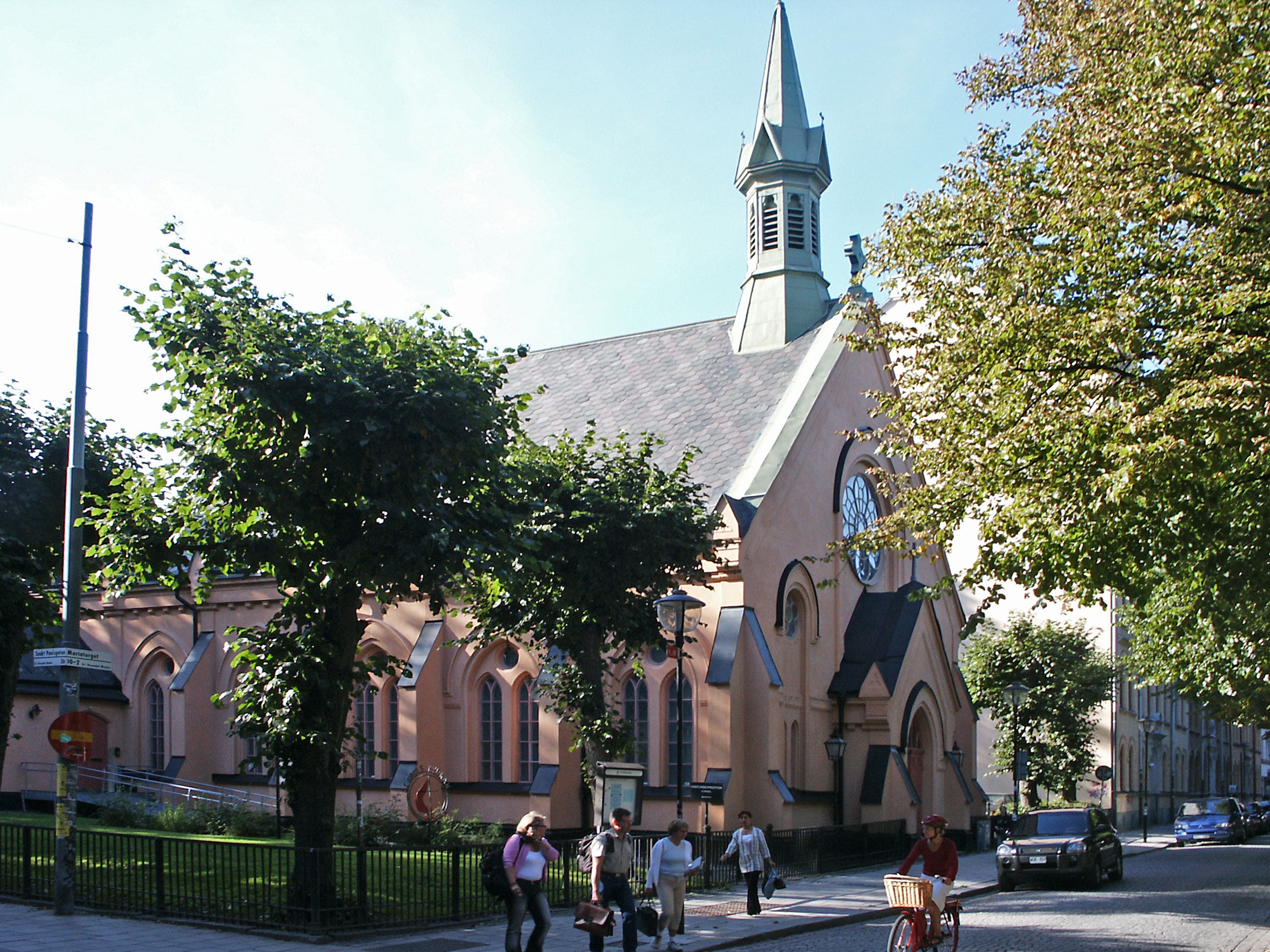
St Paul's Church

St. Paul's Church (Swedish: Sankt Paulskyrkan), also known as St. Paul's Chapel, is a former United Methodist Church of Sweden church located in Mariatorget, a square and a city park in Södermalm, central Stockholm.

The parish church, an 1876 neo-Gothic brick structure, was designed by the Swedish architects and brothers Axel and Hjalmar Kumlien.

The congregation was formed in 1868, the first Methodist church in Sweden. In 2013 it became part of the Uniting Church in Sweden (Swedish: Equmeniakyrkan) with the formation of that denomination. Owing to its declining enrollment, the remaining parishioners dissolved the parish and sold the church to Stockholms stadsmission, a local charitable organization, in 2015.
