= Hjalmar Kumlien =

Swedish architect

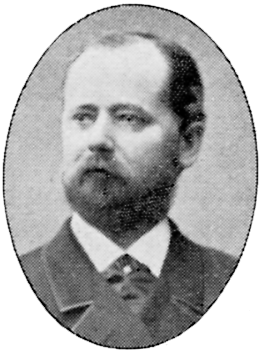
Hjalmar Kumlien

Knut Hjalmar Kumlien (17 March 1837 – 12 October 1897) was a Swedish architect.

== Biography ==
Kumlien was born in the parish of Härlunda in Västergötland, Sweden. He was the son of Ludvig Kumlien and Petronella Johanna Rhodin. Kumlien graduated at Chalmers University of Technology in 1856 and then continued his studies at the Technical Engineering School at Holzmünden in Braunschweig between 1858 and 1860. He then worked as infrastructure architect with Adolf W. Edelsvärd, the State Railways architects office between 1860 and 1872. Then he ran his their own firm with his brother Axel F. Kumlien (1833–1913).

The two brothers are authors of numerous buildings in central Stockholm, among others, part of the München Brewery building, Villa Täcka Udden on Djurgården and some 20 villas and town houses north of Humlegården. Axel and Hjalmar Kumlien also designed church building include St. Paul Church in Mariatorget, Andreas church in Högbergsgatan in Stockholm, and Ljusterö church, a unique wooden church rebuilt in 1894. They designed the Phoenix Hotel in Turku, Finland, which completed construction in 1878.

== Personal life ==
In 1868, he married Johanna Beata Charlotta Lindståhl. He was the father of architect Axel Emanuel Kumlien (1882–1971).

== Gallery ==
Architectural works by Hjalmar Kumlien
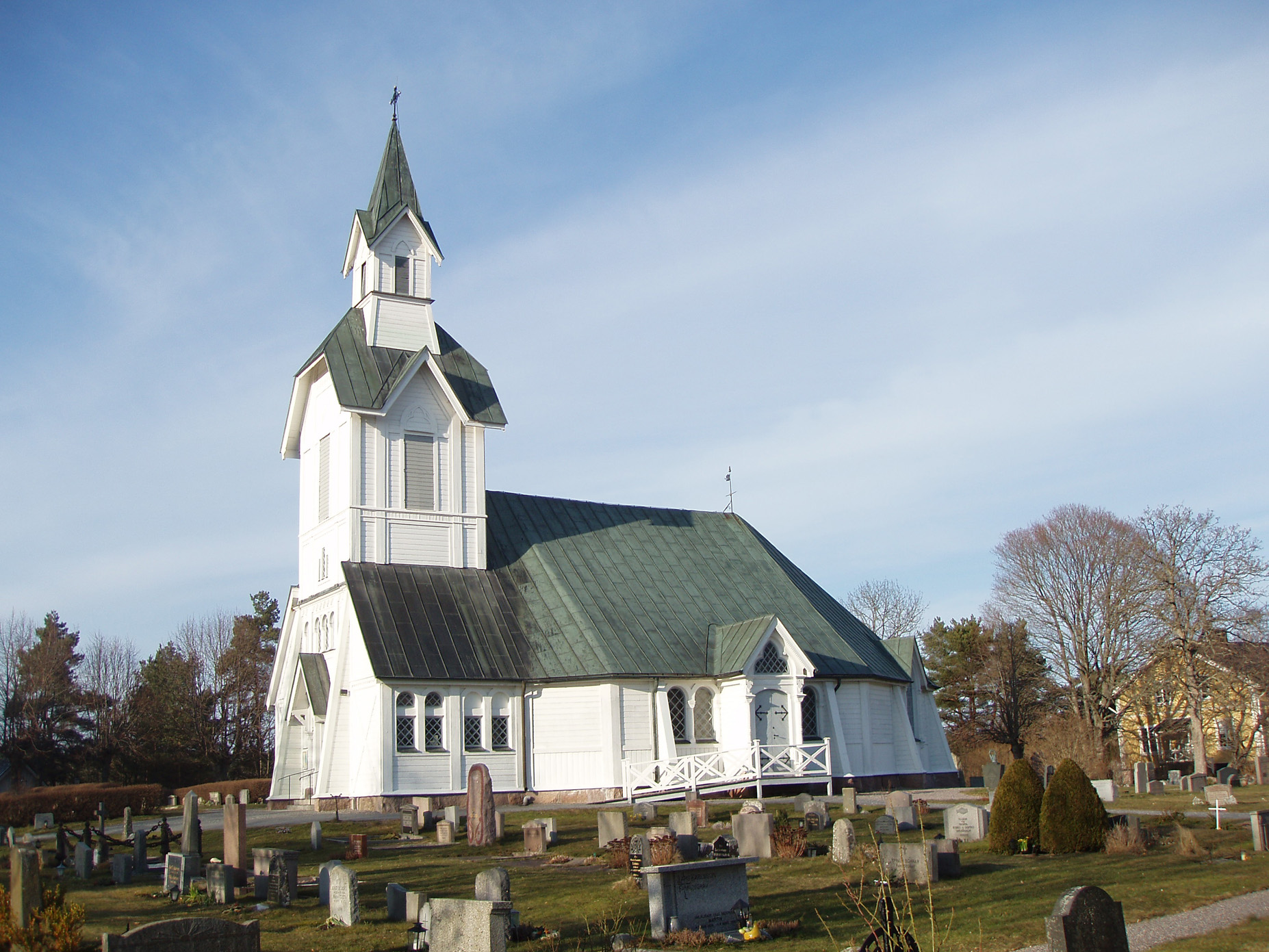
Ljusterö Church rebuilding in 1894.
Photo: March 2008.

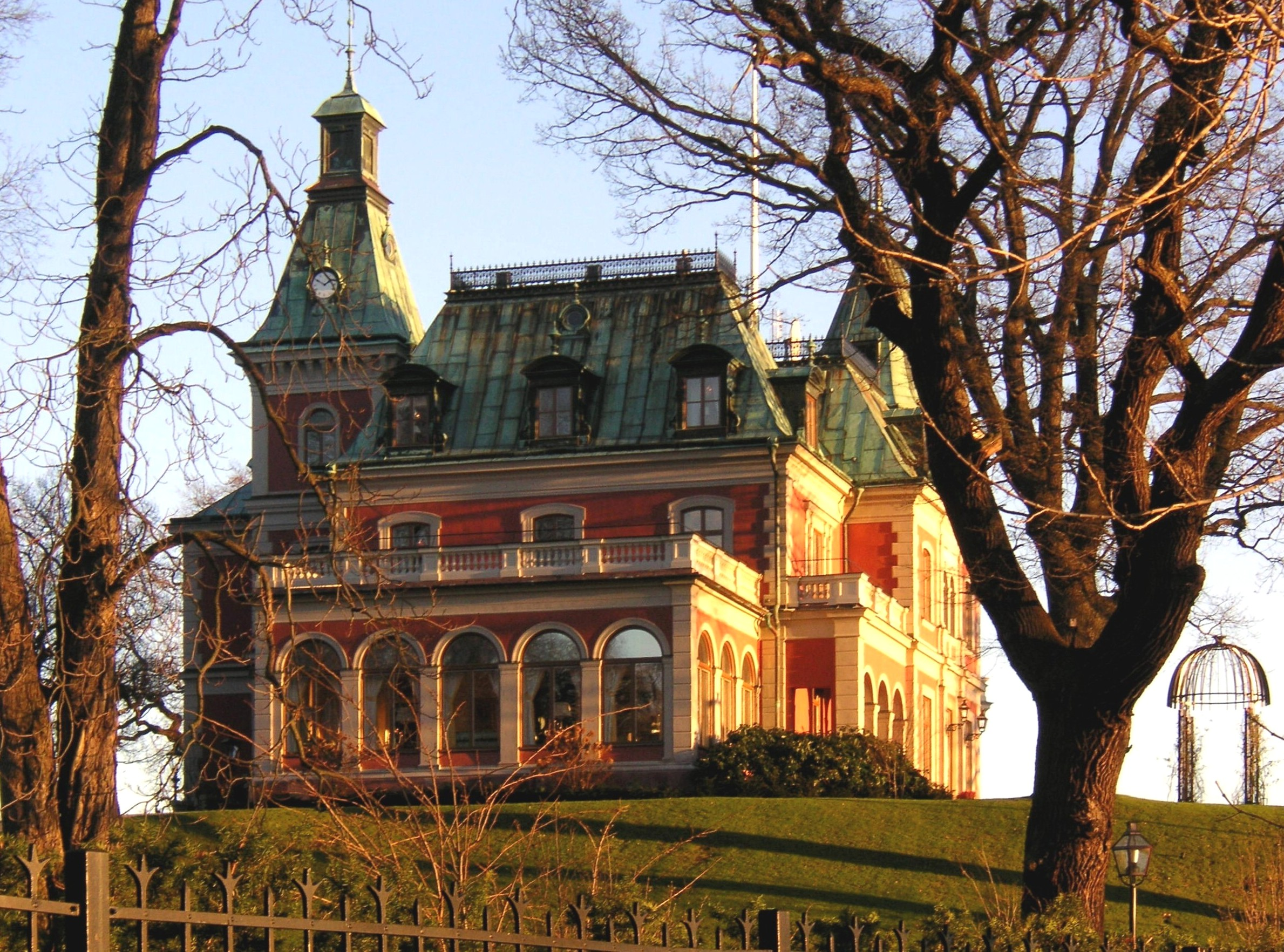
Villa Täcka udden in Djurgården, Stockholm.
Photo: July 2005.

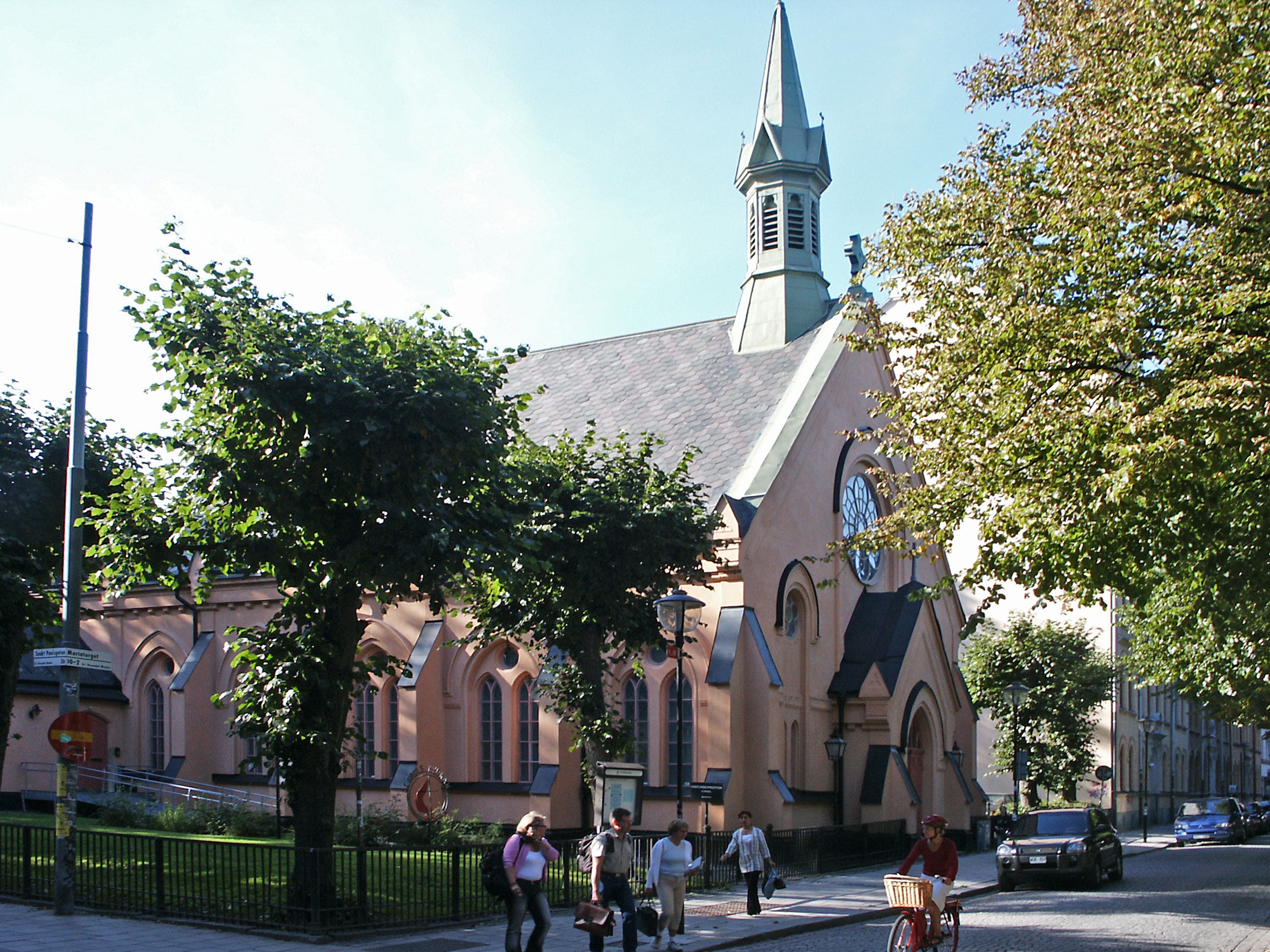
St Paul's Church in Stockholm.
Photo: September 2005.

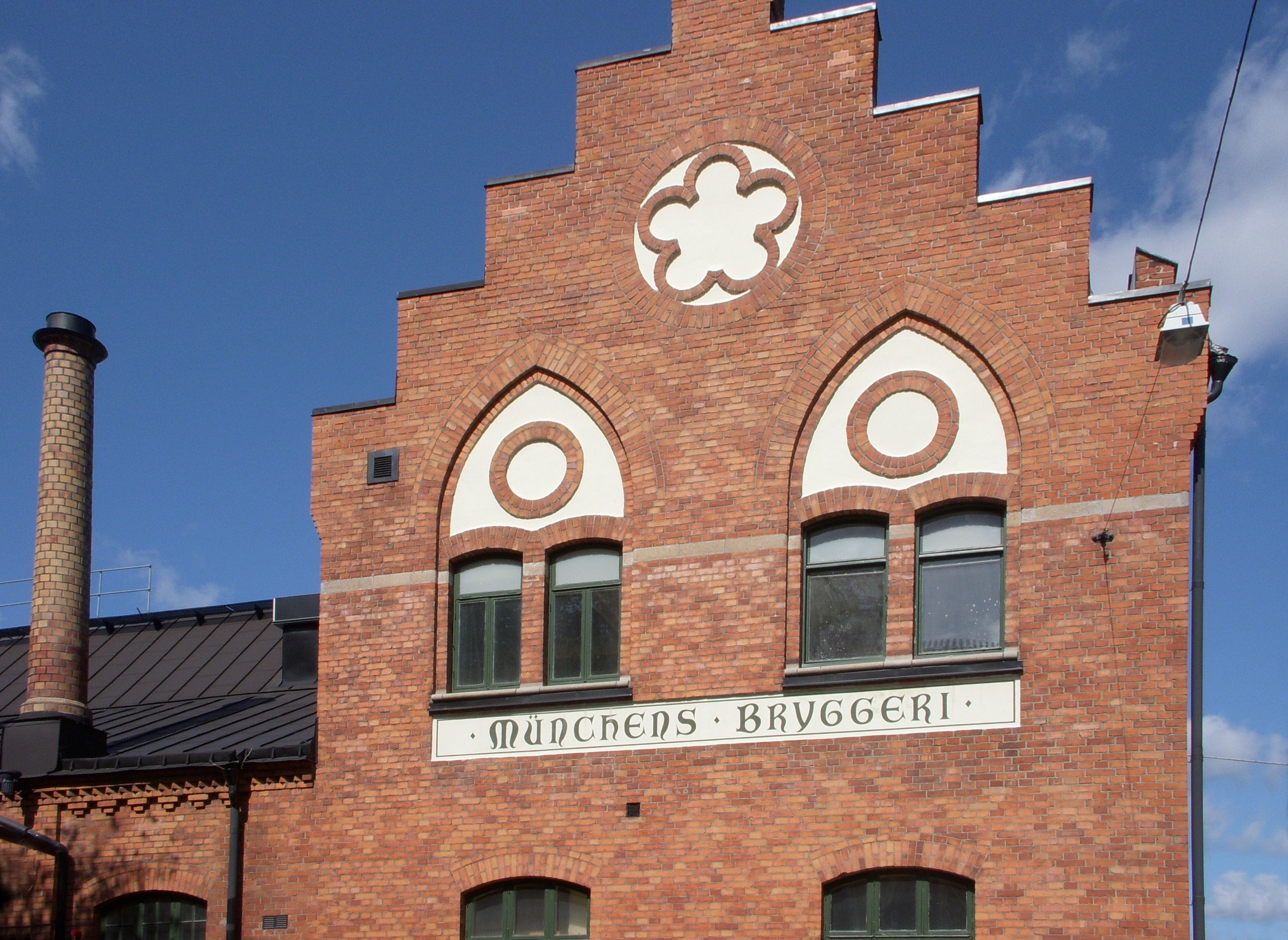
München Brewery facade, designed by Hjalmar Kumelin.

== Literature ==
- Kumlien, Hjalmar (1894), Swedish manor houses and villas by Swedish architects, Stockholm: Norstedt. Libris 8222486
- Fredric Bedoire and Henrik O. Andersson (1977), Stockholm buildings: a book on architecture and cityscape in Stockholm, (3rd edition). Stockholm: Prisma. Libris 7406664 ISBN 91-518-1125-1
