= Hansa (shopping centre) =

Hansakortteli
- Location: Turku, Finland
- Address: Yliopistonkatu 20, 20100 Turku
- Opened: 1988
- Manager: Henri Eteläpelto
- Architect: Benito Casagrande
- Num. of stores: 140
- Website: hansakortteli.fi/in-english/ (in English)

Hansakortteli (Finnish: Hansakortteli, Swedish: Hansakvarteret) is a shopping centre in the city centre of Turku, in Finland. It is located in the city's VII District, next to the main Market Square. The shopping centre hosts a total of 140 businesses, including cafés and restaurants. Åbo Svenska Teater, the oldest professional theater in Finland is also located in Hansakortteli. The Turku branch of the Stockmann department store is also located in Hansakortteli.

Hansakortteli, or Hansa, is usually considered as one of the most important shopping centres in Turku region, though it has lost some of its popularity to the out-of-town Mylly shopping centre in Raisio. The annual sales of Hansa in 2025 totalled over 198 million euros. The number of visitors in 2025 was 10,6 million.

== Stores ==
The shopping centre offers a variety of services and shops in the fields of fashion, dressing, free time and household items. It also provides restaurants and cafés; pharmacy, health and medical services.

Hansakortteli also hosts events throughout the year, such as live music and fashion events.

== Gallery ==
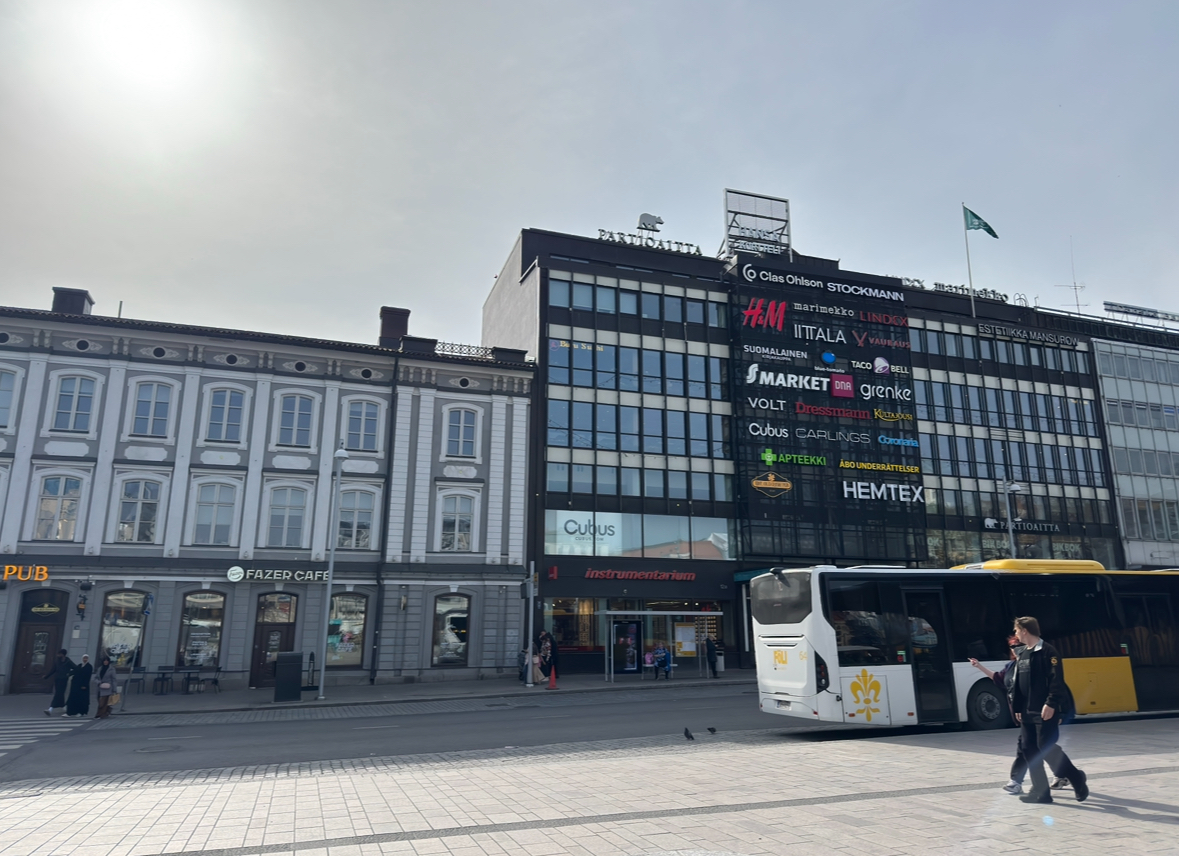
Hansakortteli from the Market Square in 2025

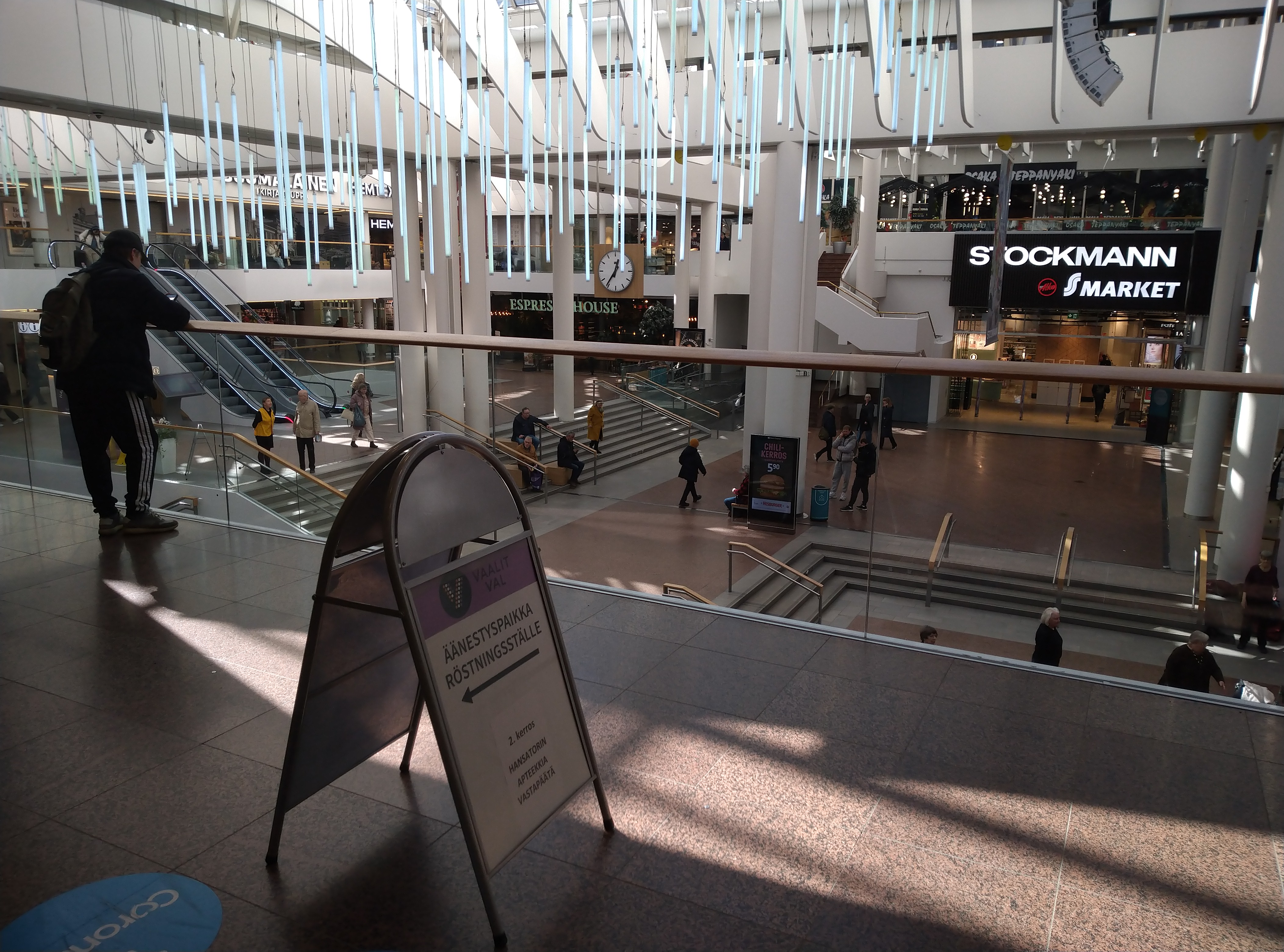
Hansatori 2025

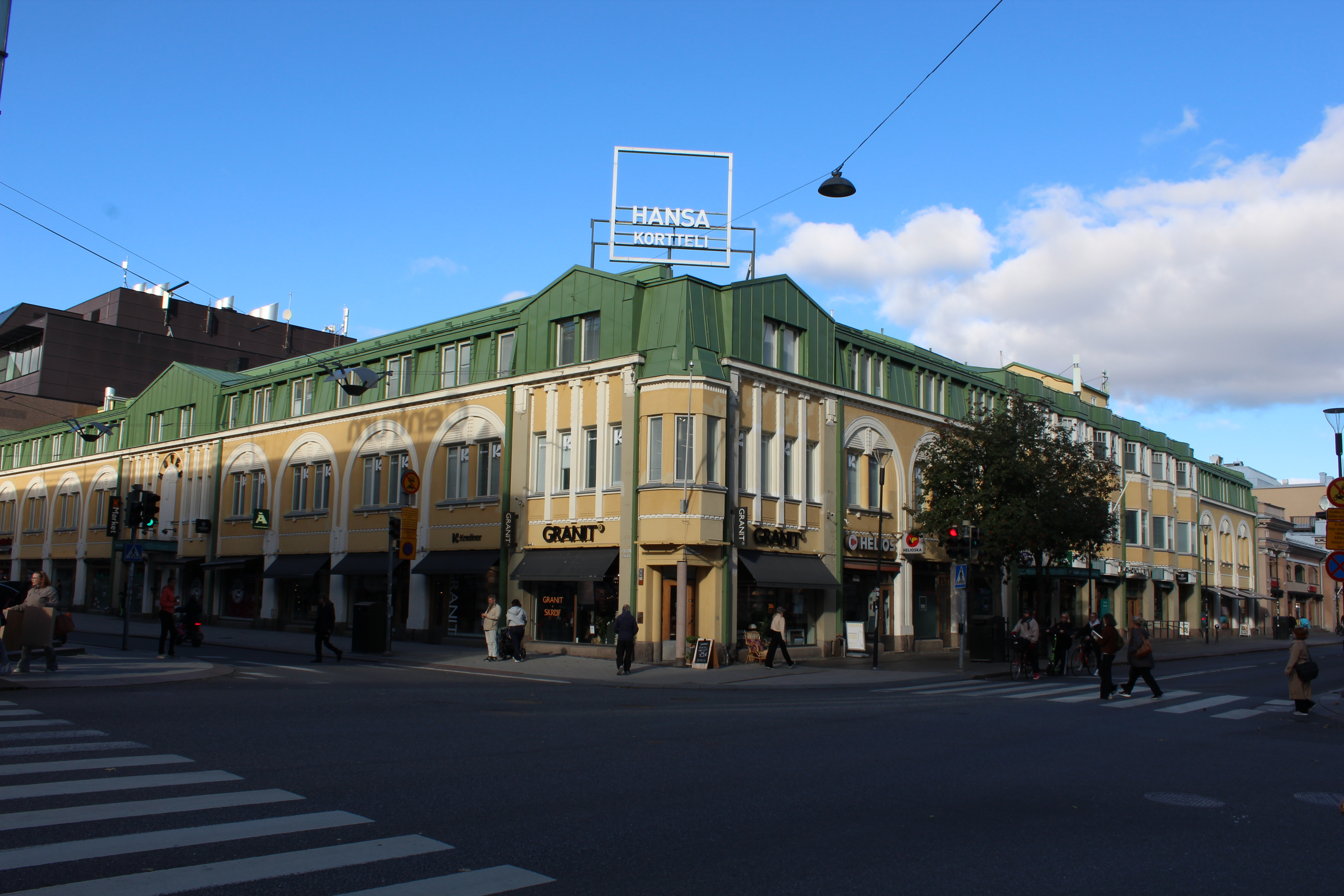
Hansakortteli (Kristiinankatu)

== See also ==
- Skanssi (shopping centre)
