= Yliopistonkatu (Turku) =

Street in Turku, Finland

Coordinates: 60°27′06″N 22°15′54″E

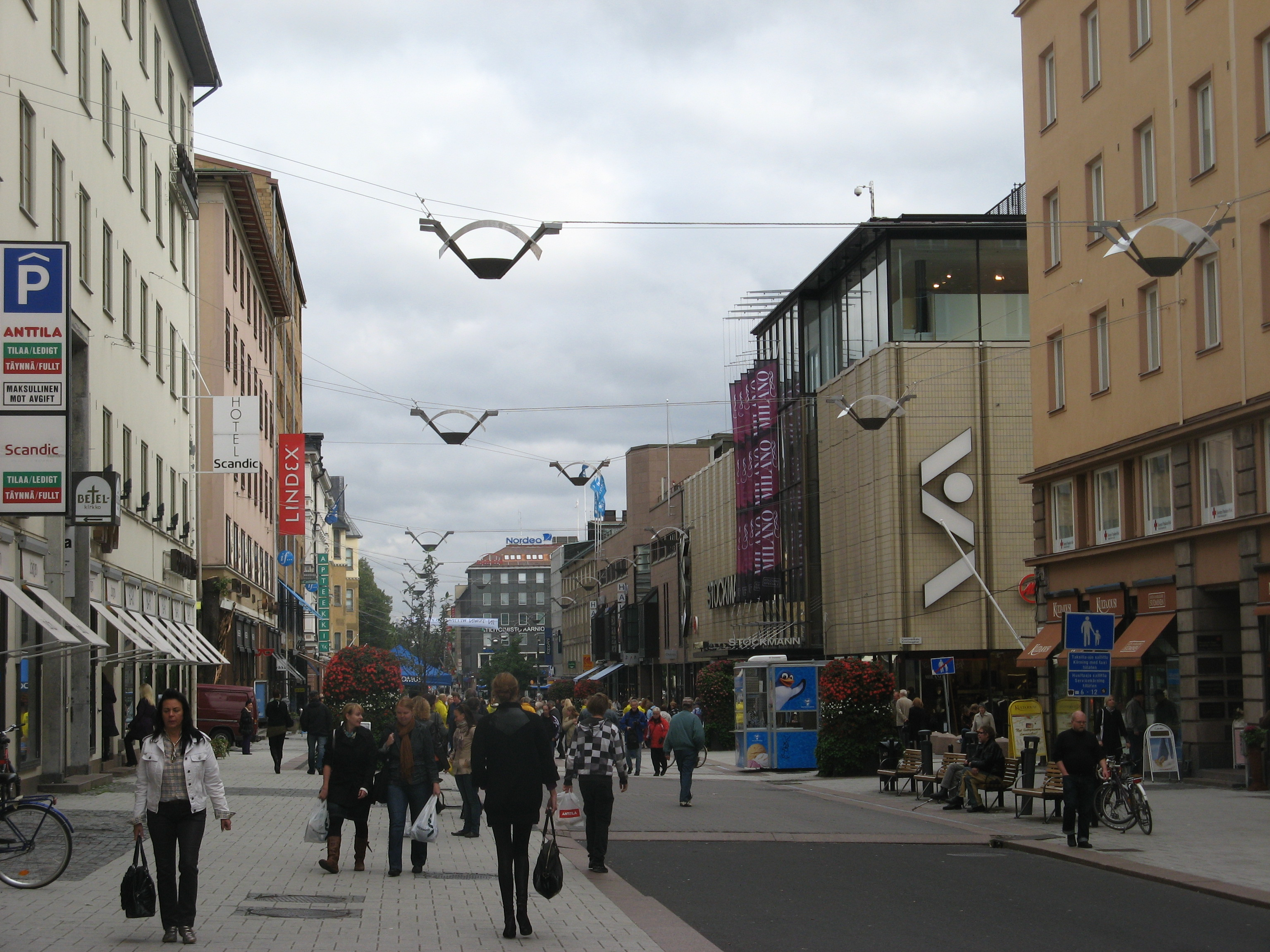
Yliopistonkatu in September 2008

Yliopistonkatu (Finnish: [ˈyliˌopistonˌkɑtu]; Swedish: Universitetsgatan; literally "University Street") is a 1,5-kilometer-long street located in the city center of Turku, Finland, running parallel to the Aura River, starting at Kutomonkatu and ending at Koulukatu. Since 2001, the part of Yliopistonkatu between Aurakatu and Humalistonkatu, which is about four hundred meters long, has been a pedestrian street. The area of the current pedestrian street has been Turku's Christmas street since 1948. The Turku Market Square is also located along Yliopistonkatu.

Yliopistonkatu is one of the streets in the town plan designed by Carl Ludvig Engel after the Great Fire of Turku. The street was formerly known as the "Russian Church Street" (Venäjän Kirkkokatu) according to the Church of the Holy Martyr Empress Alexandra located along it. In February 1924, the street was named Yliopistonkatu in the building of the former Phoenix Hotel along it, which had been operating since 1922 at the University of Turku. Other options for the street were Kustaa Aadolfin katu and Vapaudenkatu, but Yliopistonkatu took the win. After the university moved to Yliopistonmäki (literally "University Hill") in 1955, initiatives have been taken by the Nomenclature Committee to transform Yliopistonkatu into Mannerheiminkatu, Leningradinkatu or Göteborginkatu. However, the name has remained the same.
