= Turku City Office =

Building in Turku, Finland

Office building, Kristiinankatu 1.
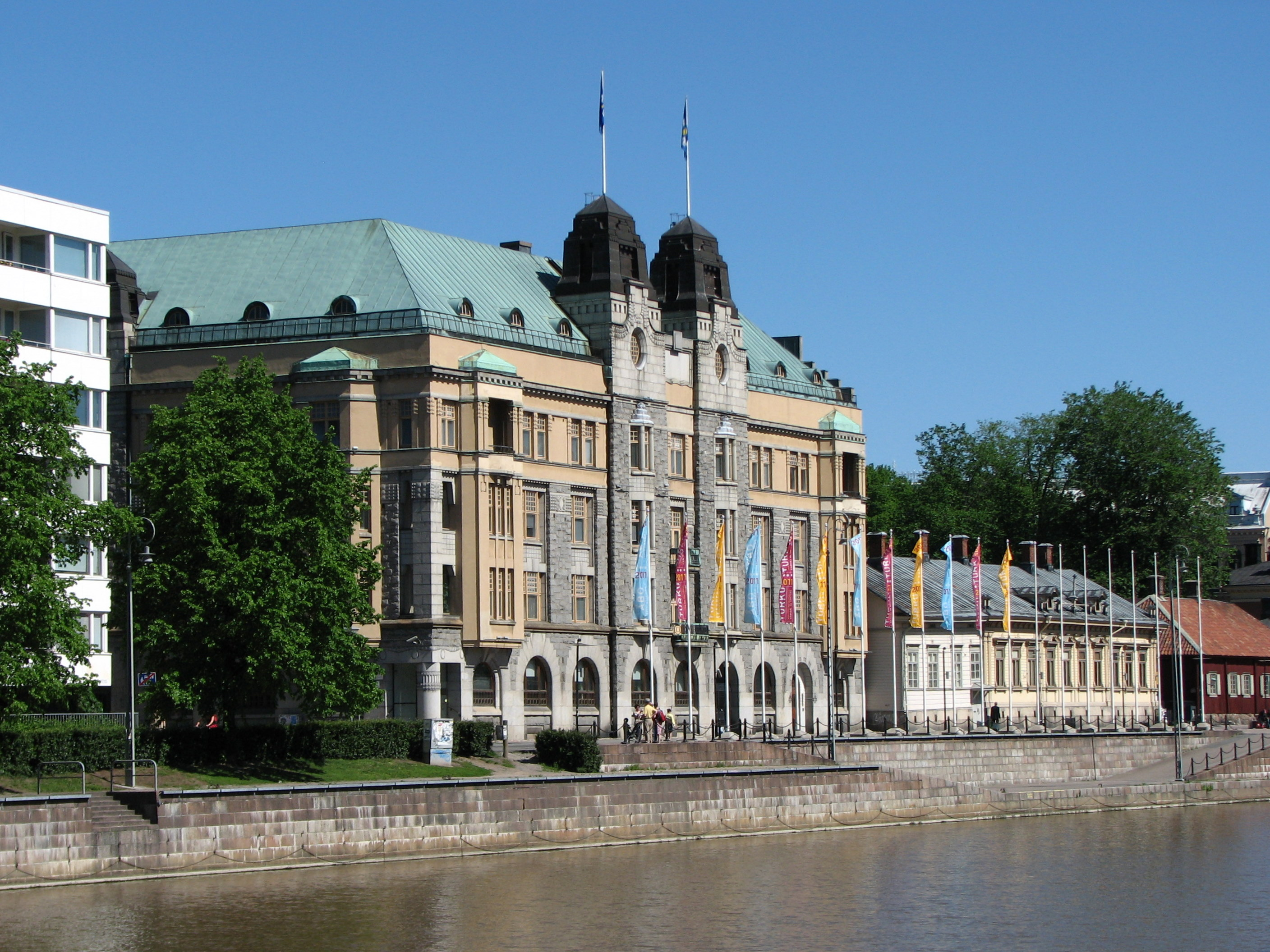
- The Former Turku City Office building on the west side of the Aura River.
- Interactive map of the Office building, Kristiinankatu 1. area
- Former names: Turku City Office

General information
- Architectural style: Art Nouveau
- Location: Turku, Finland, Kristiinankatu 1
- Coordinates: 60.448131°N 22.266375°E

Turku City Office is located in Turku, Finland and is supervised by the Mayor. Its tasks include preparing the decisions of the City Council, and the City Board and its subdivisions, as well as the implementation of these decisions. The City Office also aids the Mayor in directing the administration of the City, in directing finances, and with matters concerning personnel and outside relations. The City Office also aids the Deputy Mayors in the management of their respective tasks, and takes care of centralised services determined by the City Board.

Until the end of 2011 the city offices were located in an Art Nouveau-style building completed in 1909, originally an apartment building by the river Aura. In 2010 the building was sold by the city to a group of investors. Their plan is to refurbish it back into an apartment building.
