= Turku City Hall =

Building in Finland

Coordinates: 60.4489°N 22.2686°E

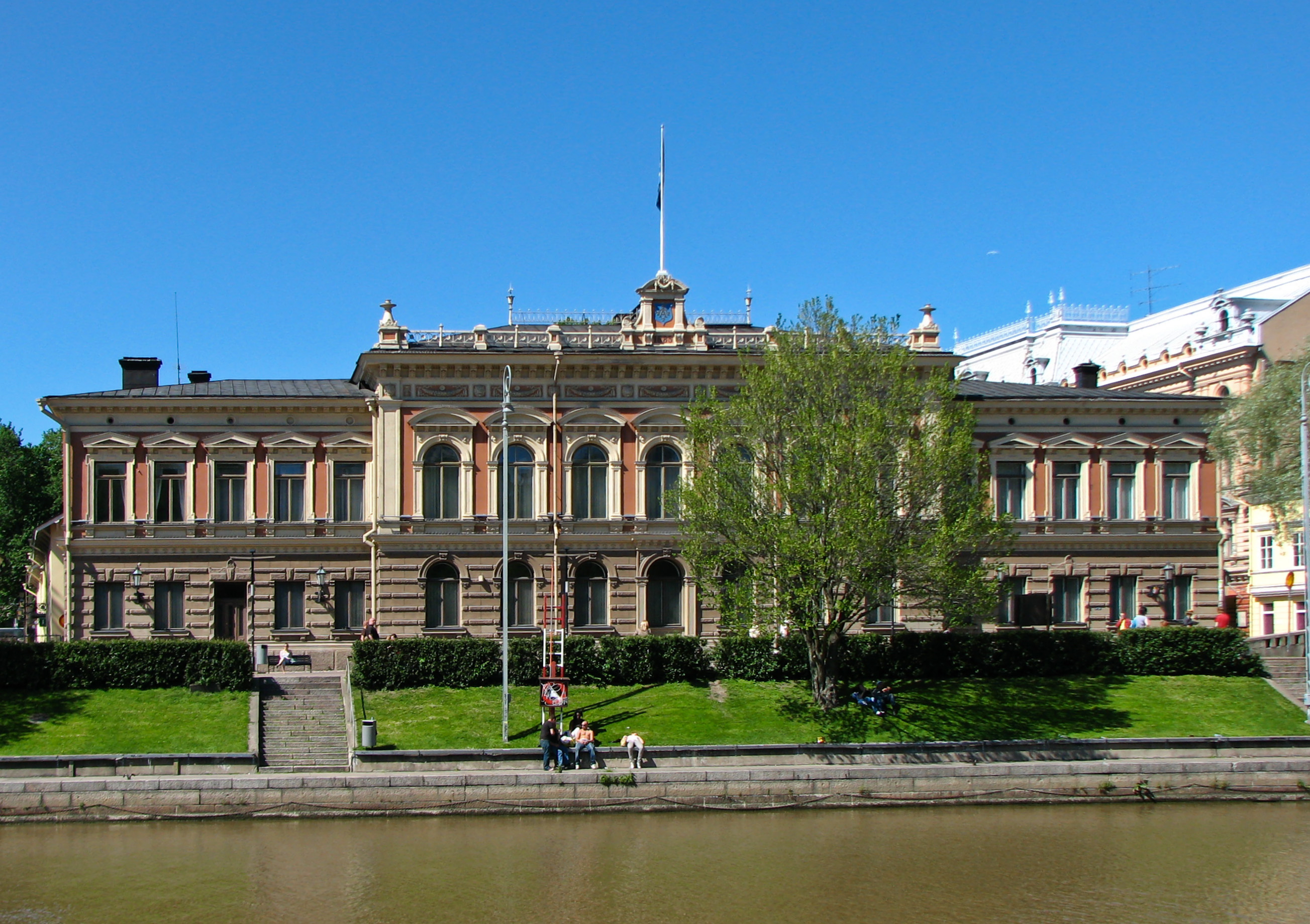
- Turku City Hall on the west side of the Aura River
- Interactive map of the Turku City Hall area

General information
- Architectural style: Neo-Renaissance
- Location: Turku, Finland, Aurakatu 2
- Construction started: 1810
- Completed: 1811
- Renovated: 1879-1883

Design and construction
- Architect: Charles Bassi
- Other designers: F. A. Sjöström

Turku City Hall (Finnish: Turun kaupungintalo, Swedish: Åbo stadshus) is a Neo-Renaissance building on the bank of the Aura River in Turku, Finland. The City Council of Turku convenes there. The mayor worked in an Art Nouveau building near the City Hall, the Turku City Office, until 2011.

It was originally designed by Charles Bassi from 1810 to 1811 as the restaurant Seurahuone. The building survived the Great Fire of Turku in 1827. It was redone between 1879 and 1883 as the city hall under plans by Frans A. Sjöström.

The first floor used to have the register office of Turku up until 1975 and Turku district court until 1997. After the district court of Turku moved to the new Turku courthouse, the first floor was replaced by work, meeting and legislative spaces in 1999. The second floor of the building is decorated with gold and massive crystal crowning. The wing of the building, located on Aurakatu 4, is for city council groups' rooms and travel agency services.

The public can enter the building during specific events such as Turku Day. The public is also permitted to witness the city council assembly.
