= VI District, Turku =

City district in Turku, Finland

Coordinates: 60°27′15″N 022°16′15″E

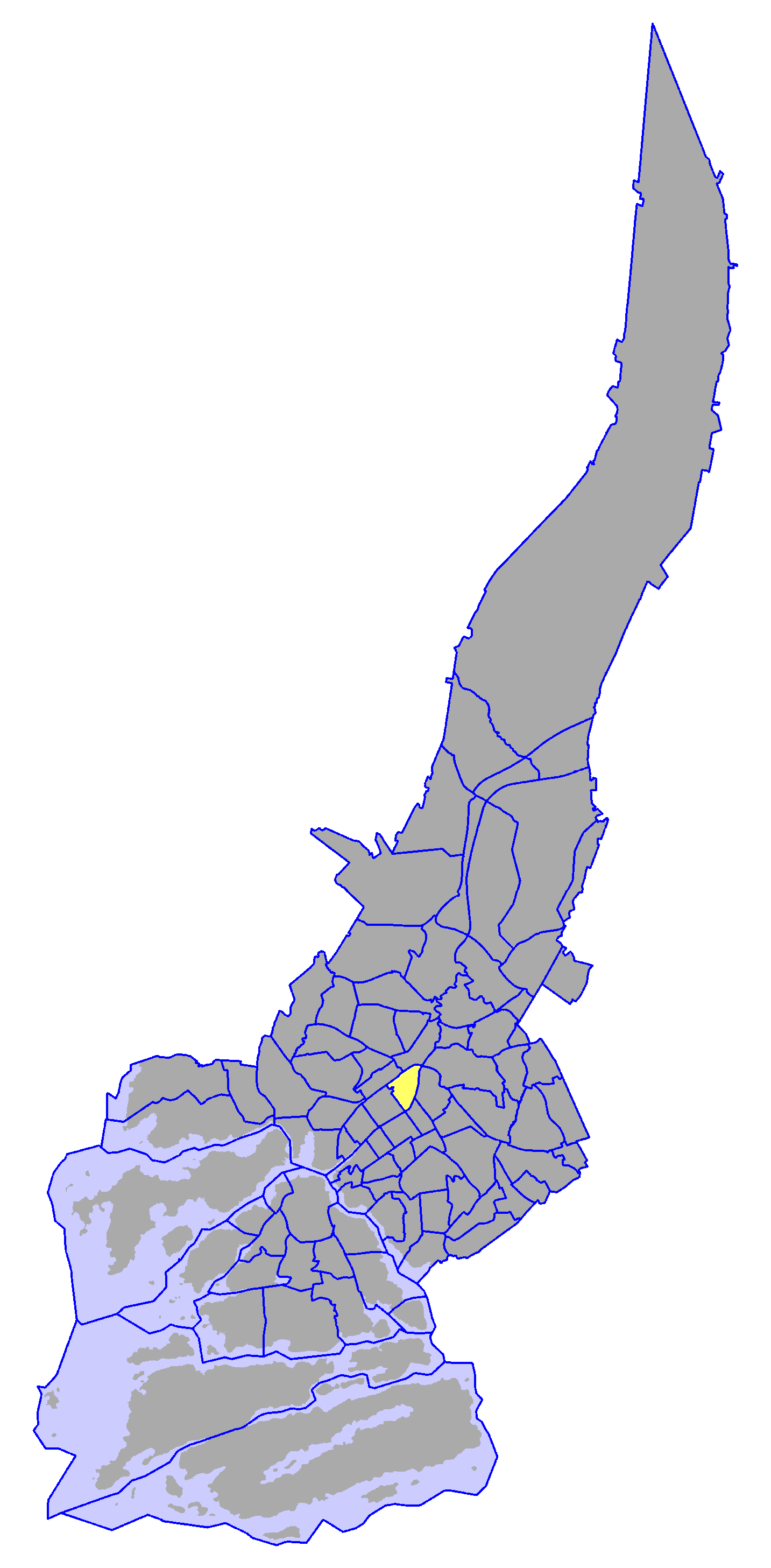
The VI District on a map of Turku.

The VI District is the northernmost of the central districts of Turku, Finland. It is located on the west side of the river Aura, to the east of Aurakatu. It forms part of the city's central business district, hosting a large proportion of the city's business life, particularly around the central Market Square (Kauppatori). The city's main bus station and the head library are also located in this district. The Finnish national road 1 begins in the VI District.

The district is the fifth largest in the city, having a population of 6,187 (as of 2004) and an annual population growth rate of -0.15%. 5.11% of the district's population are under 15 years old, while 22.64% are over 65. The district's linguistic makeup is 87.23% Finnish, 10.00% Swedish, and 2.77% other.

== See also ==
- Districts of Turku
- Districts of Turku by population
