= Market Square, Turku =

Square in Turku, Finland

Coordinates: 60°27′06″N 022°16′01″E

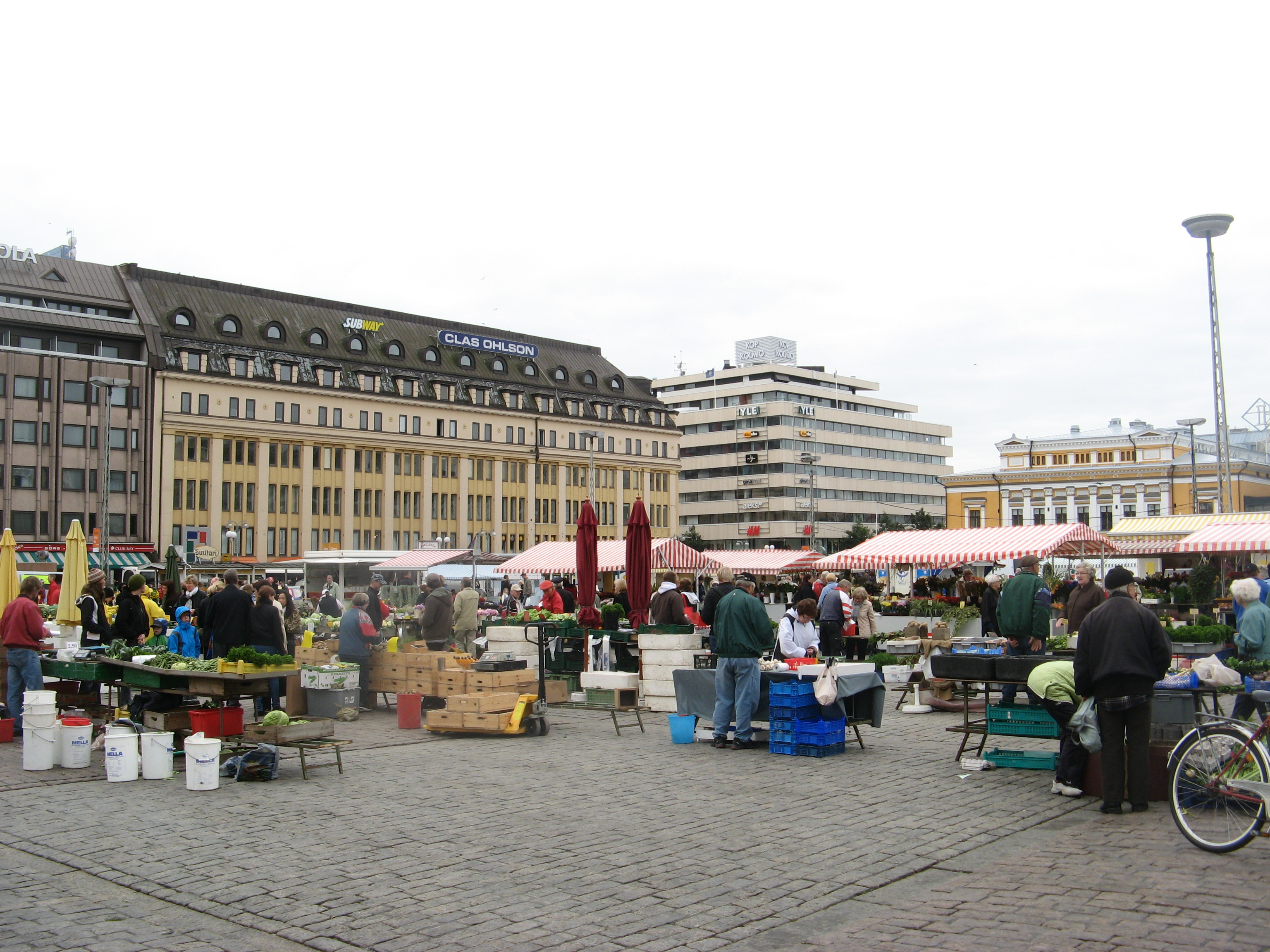
Market square towards Aurakatu (Aura Street) and Eerikinkatu (Eric's Street).

The Market Square (Finnish: Kauppatori, Swedish: Salutorget) is a city square in the city of Turku, in Finland. It is located in the city's VI District, and is generally considered the city's central square. It hosts a lively market on weekdays, and there are several cafés and restaurants on the square.

The buildings around the Market Square are also part of the city's central business district. They include, for instance, the Hansa and Forum shopping centres, the Wiklund department store, an Orthodox church, a private medical clinic, and several instances of media such as an office of Finland's major newspaper Helsingin Sanomat, locally most significant newspaper Turun Sanomat and Yle.

== Centre for local buses ==
Two of the four streets around the rectangular square, Aurakatu/Auragatan (to the west) and Eerikinkatu/Eriksgatan (to the south), are barred from all traffic other than the city's public transport buses and taxis. The square is somewhat of a public transport hub: there are 14 bus stops around the square and the majority of local and regional buses in Turku stop there. There is also a taxi rank on the north side of the square, on Yliopistonkatu/Universitetsgatan, which is also reserved for taxis only between midnight and 06:00.

== Future plans ==
Turku's city council is currently discussing plans to build a two-storey car park under the square, with spaces for 600 cars in order to help with perceived parking problems in the city centre, which are not confirmed to be existing in any research or numbers. The construction scheme would possibly include turning Yliopistonkatu/Universitetsgatan and Aurakatu/Auragatan into pedestrian streets and moving the bus stops to Kauppiaskatu/Köpmansgatan on the east side of the square, which would be restricted for public transport only.

Critics have argued that the planned parking complex would increase pollution in the city centre and create disturbance in the lengthy construction stage. Many people also see it as unnecessary, since there are already many such complexes in the city centre. In the 2008, names of 13,000 citizens of Turku was collected in street survey for having a referendum.

== Photo gallery ==
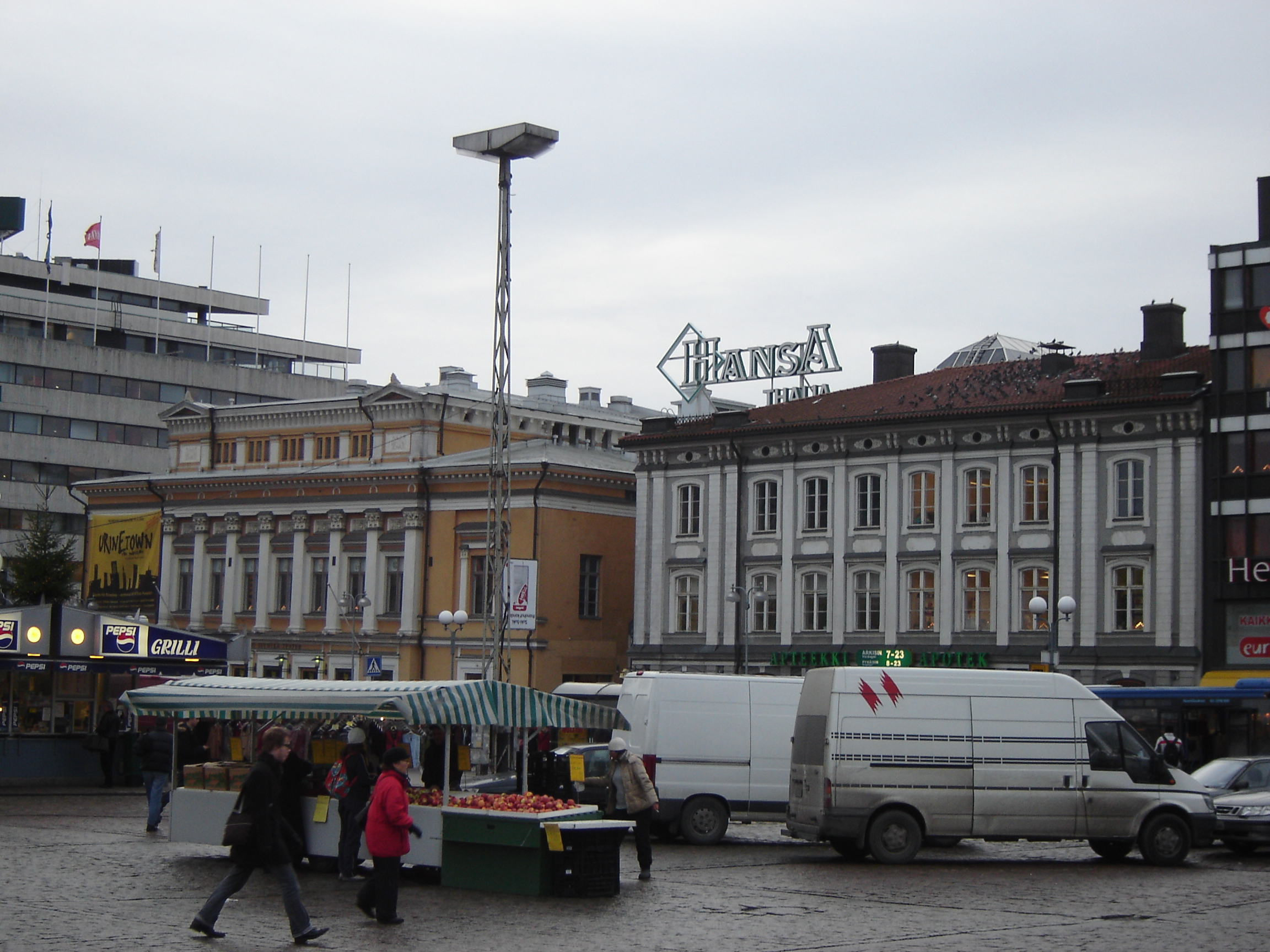
Part of the market square and the Hansa shopping centre.

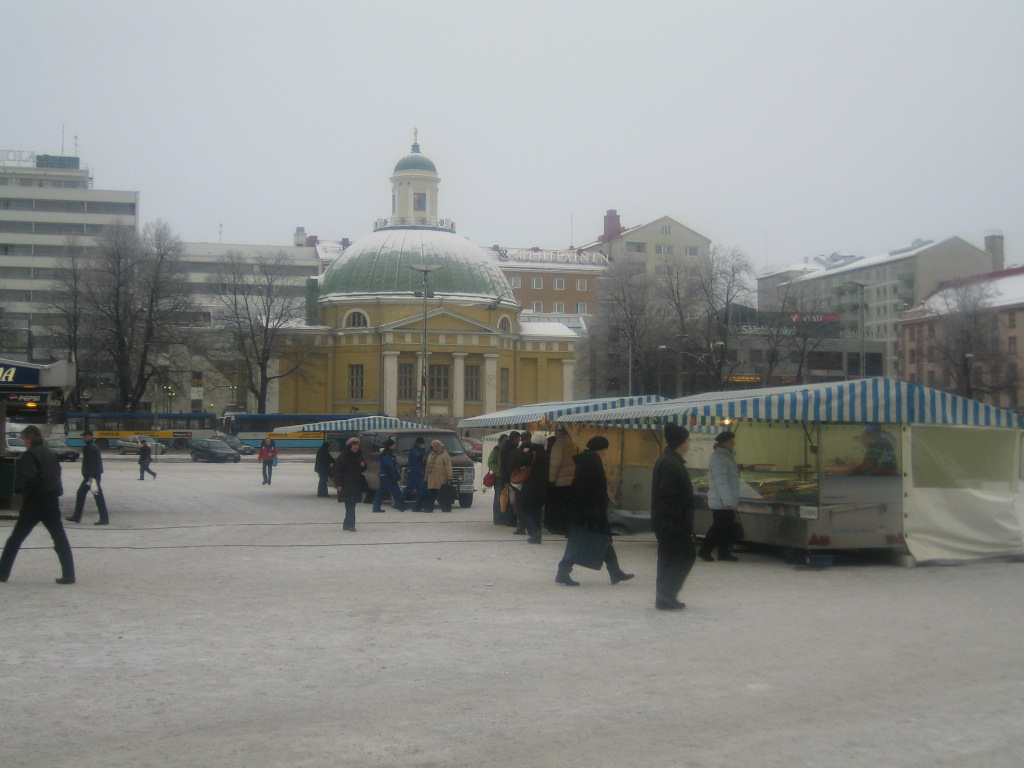
The Orthodox church and some market stands

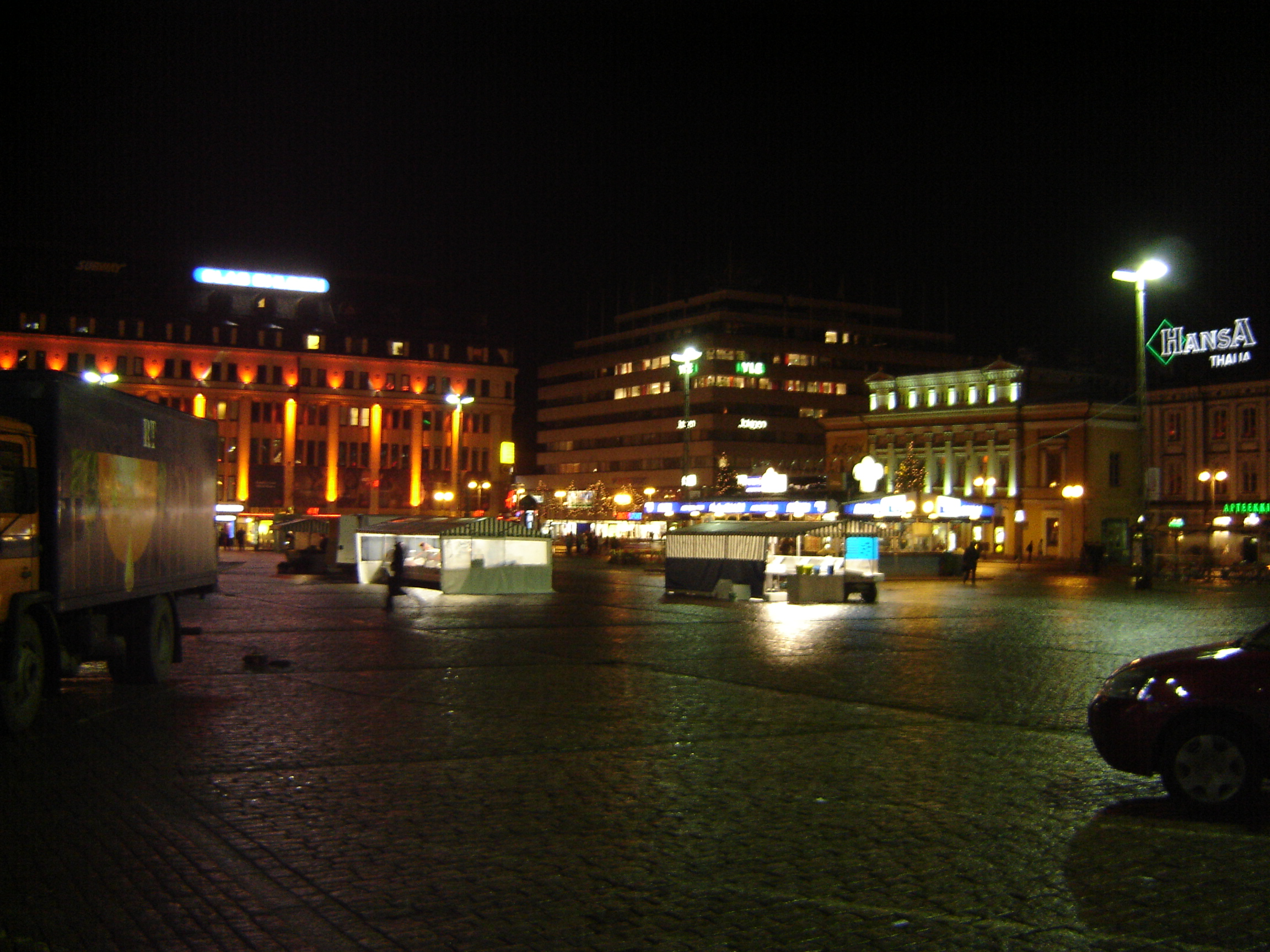
Market square in the morning
