= Library Bridge =

Bridge in Turku, Finland

Library Bridge Kirjastosilta Biblioteksbron
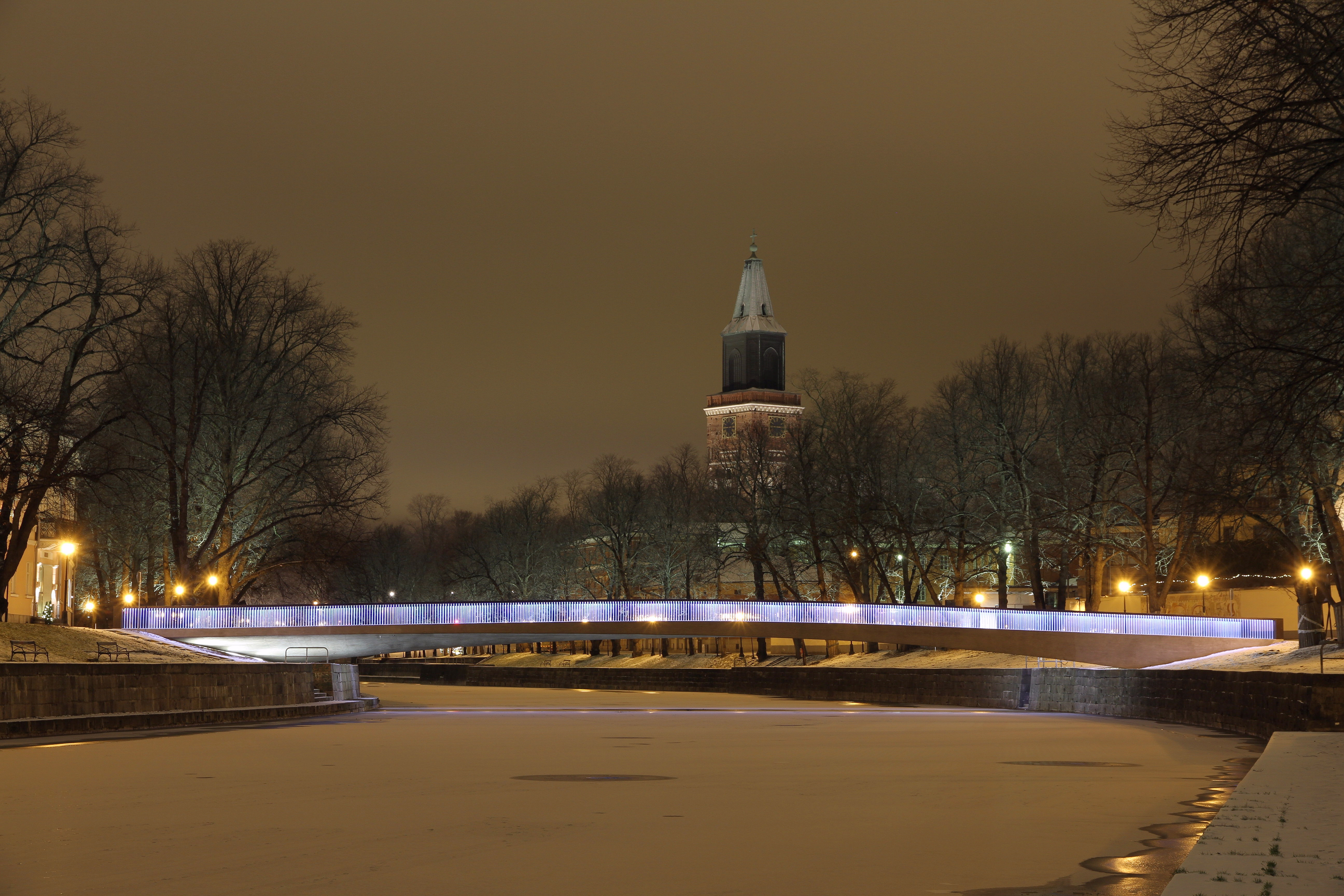
- Illuminated Library Bridge with the Turku Cathedral in the background.
- Coordinates: 60°26′58.0″N 022°16′19.5″E
- Carries: Pedestrians, bicycles
- Crosses: Aura River (Finland)
- Locale: Turku, Finland
- Maintained by: City of Turku

Characteristics
- Material: Concrete
- Total length: 60 metres (197 ft)
- Width: 5 metres (16 ft)
- Height: 4 metres (13 ft)

History
- Opened: 3 December 2013; 11 years ago

Location
- Interactive map of Library Bridge

The Library Bridge (Finnish: Kirjastosilta, Swedish: Biblioteksbron) is a pedestrian and cycling bridge in Turku designed by Pontek Oy. Located at the city centre, the bridge crosses the Aura River connecting the streets Kauppiaskatu and Rettiginrinne. The bridge was opened for traffic in 2013, and it was named as the result of a public naming contest. The Turku Main Library is located near the bridge.

The glass railing of the bridge is illuminated during the dark hours, and the programmable illumination enables the use of different colors during holidays and special occasions. The bridge has won several construction awards.

== Location ==
The Library Bridge crosses the Aura River in the City Centre of Turku connecting the VI District on the west side and the II District on the east side. The Kauppiaskatu leads towards north-west from the bridge and the Rettiginrinne leads towards south-east. The Turku Main Library is located near the bridge on the west side, and on the east side the bridge ends at the corner of the Rettig palace, in which the Aboa Vetus & Ars Nova museum is housed. Among the bridges that cross the Aura River, the Library Bridge is located between the Cathedral Bridge and the Aura Bridge.

From the Library Bridge opens a view to the historical riverside of Turku. There was a long public discussion about the location of the bridge before its construction, since many of its opponents considered that the bridge damages the national landscape of the Aura River. Every summer since 2011 the bird sculpture Eiders by the artist Reima Nurmikko has been placed in the Aura River on the north side of the Library Bridge.
