= II District, Turku =

City district in Turku, Finland

Coordinates: 60°26′50″N 22°16′40″E

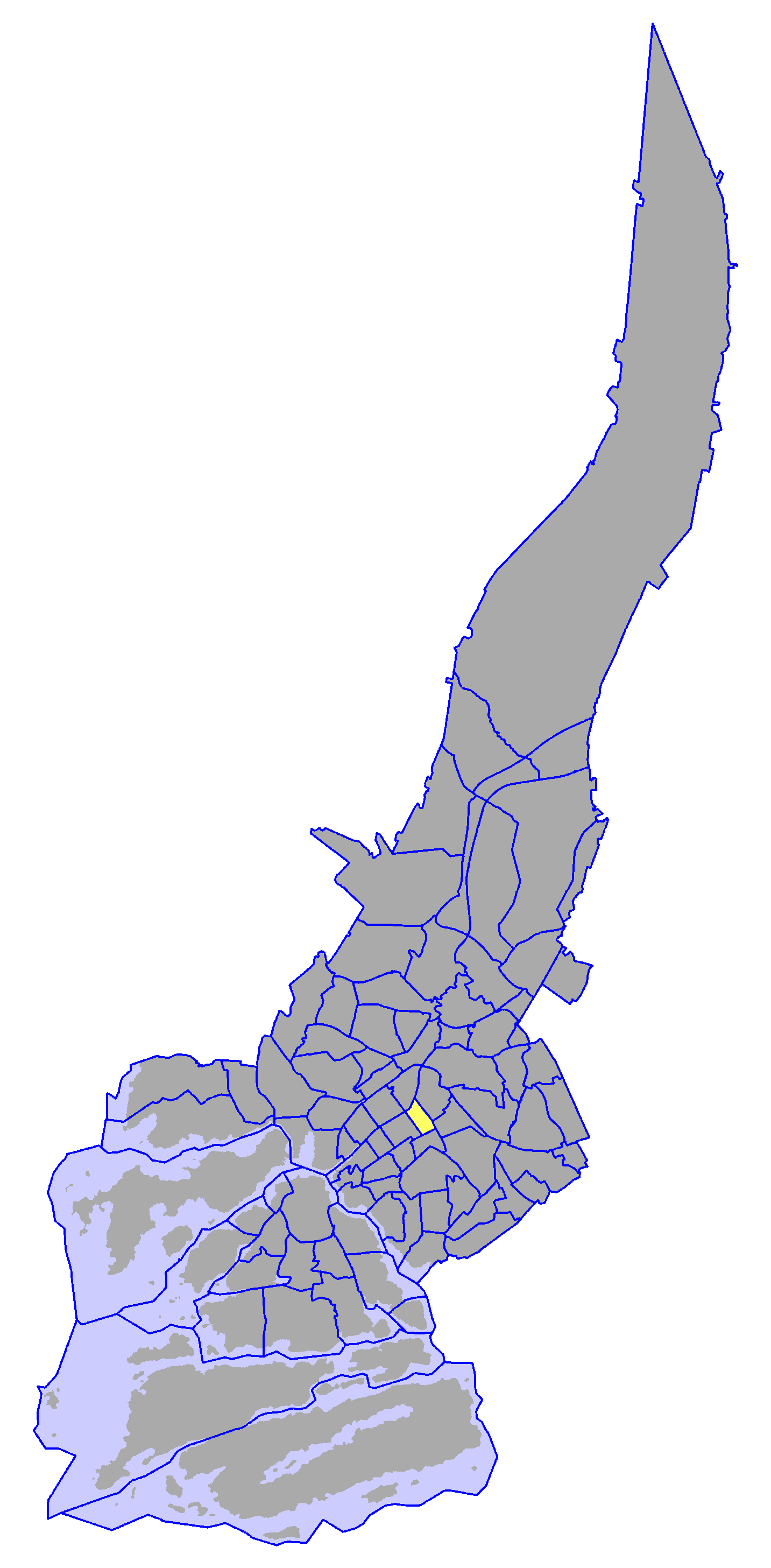
The II District on a map of Turku.

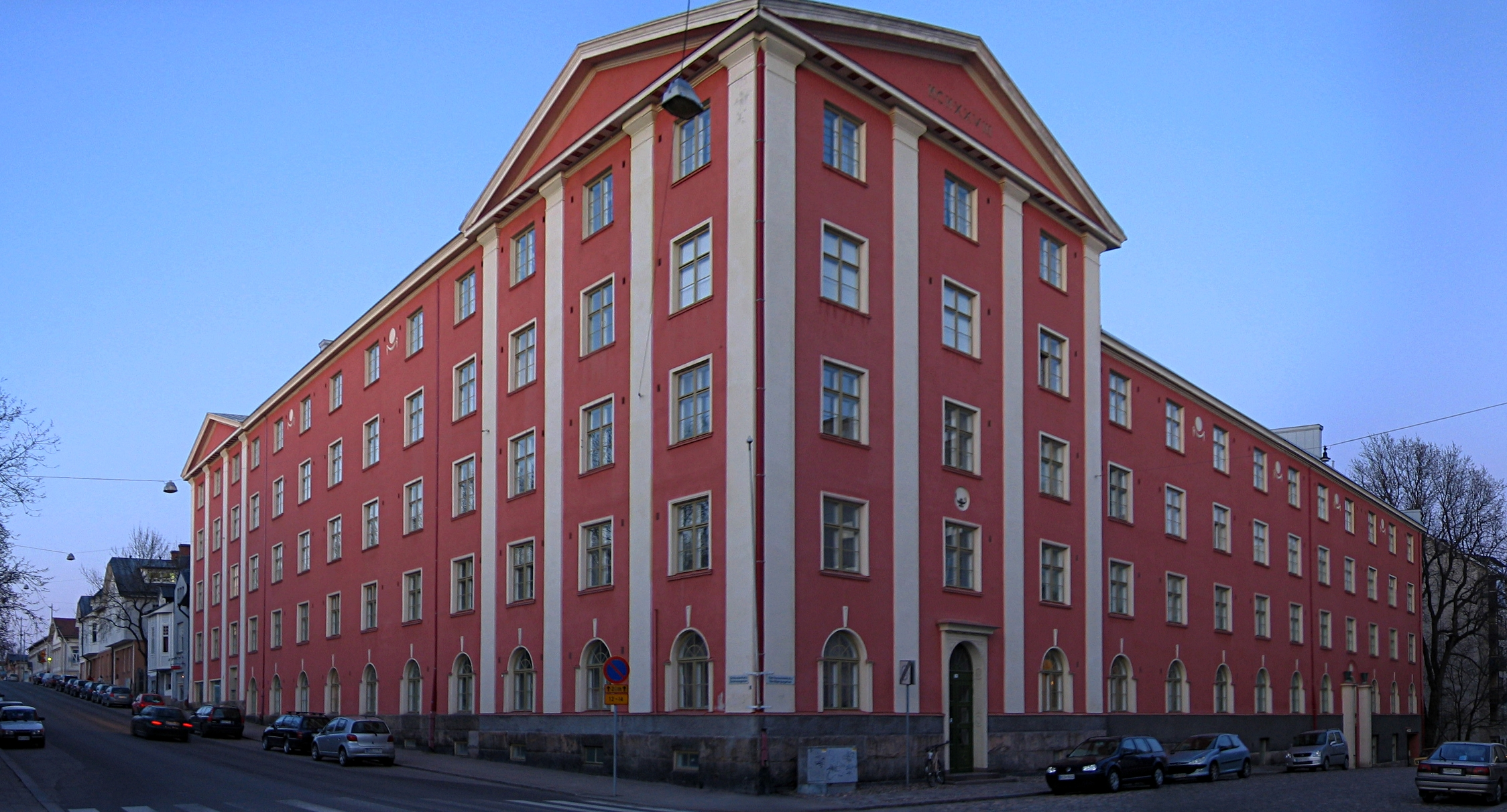
Sirkkalankatu 26, an empire building built in 1928.

The II District is one of the central districts of Turku, Finland. It is located on the east side of the river Aura, between Uudenmaankatu and Kaskenkatu. The district is located on the historical centre of the city, and contains numerous cultural and historical venues, such as the Luostarinmäki handicrafts museum, the Aboa Vetus & Ars Nova twin museums, and the Old Great Square, the city's oldest marketplace. It also hosts events such as the Medieval Market of Turku. A large portion of the district's land area is also taken up by the Vartiovuori park.

The district has a population of 2,878 (as of 2007) and an annual population growth rate of -1.06%. 5.89% of the district's population are under 15 years old, while 24.12% are over 65. The district's linguistic makeup is 82.63% Finnish, 15.66% Swedish, and 1.71% other. The II District has the largest proportion of Finland-Swedes out of all the districts of Turku, and as a result it hosts two Swedish-language schools.

== See also ==
- Districts of Turku
- Districts of Turku by population
