= Old Great Square (Turku) =

Historic market square in the city centre of Turku, Finland

Coordinates: 60°27′3″N 22°16′33″E

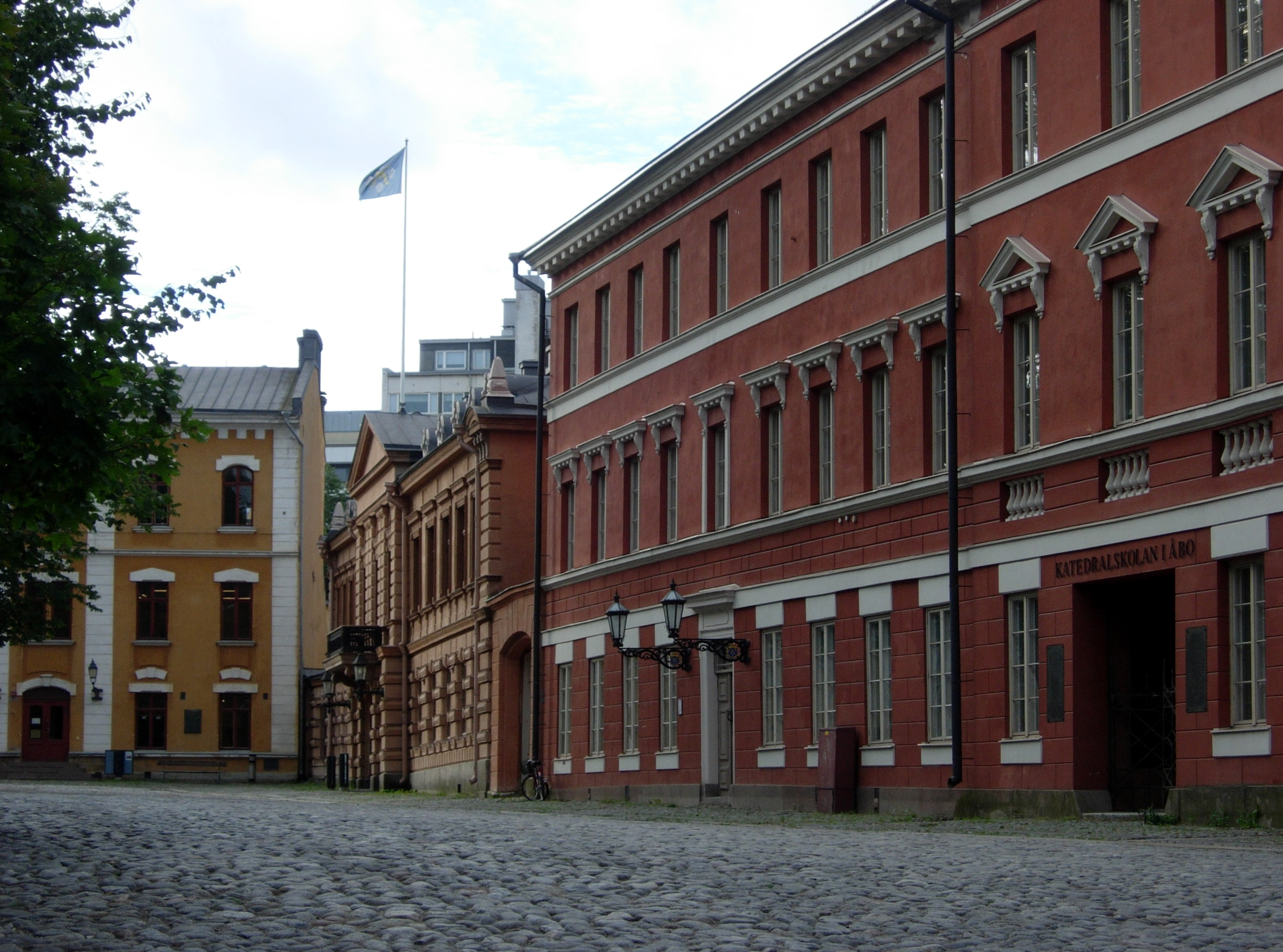
Buildings along the Old Great Square: (from left to right) the Old Town Hall, Brinkkala Mansion and Katedralskolan i Åbo

The Old Great Square (Finnish: Vanha Suurtori, Swedish: Gamla Stortorget) is a medieval market square located in the city centre of Turku, Finland. It is located in the II District in very close proximity to Turku Cathedral. The area was the administrative and commercial centre of Turku since the founding of the city in the 13th century up until the Great Fire of Turku.

Today, there are buildings alongside the Old Great Square, but only on the southern side because the blocks on the northern side changed to Porthaninpuisto after the fire. There are four historical buildings which the City of Turku restored for cultural use: the Brinkkala Mansion, Old Town Hall, Hjelt Mansion and Juselius Mansion. The buildings were mainly constructed after the fire and represent neoclassicism.

== Historical buildings ==
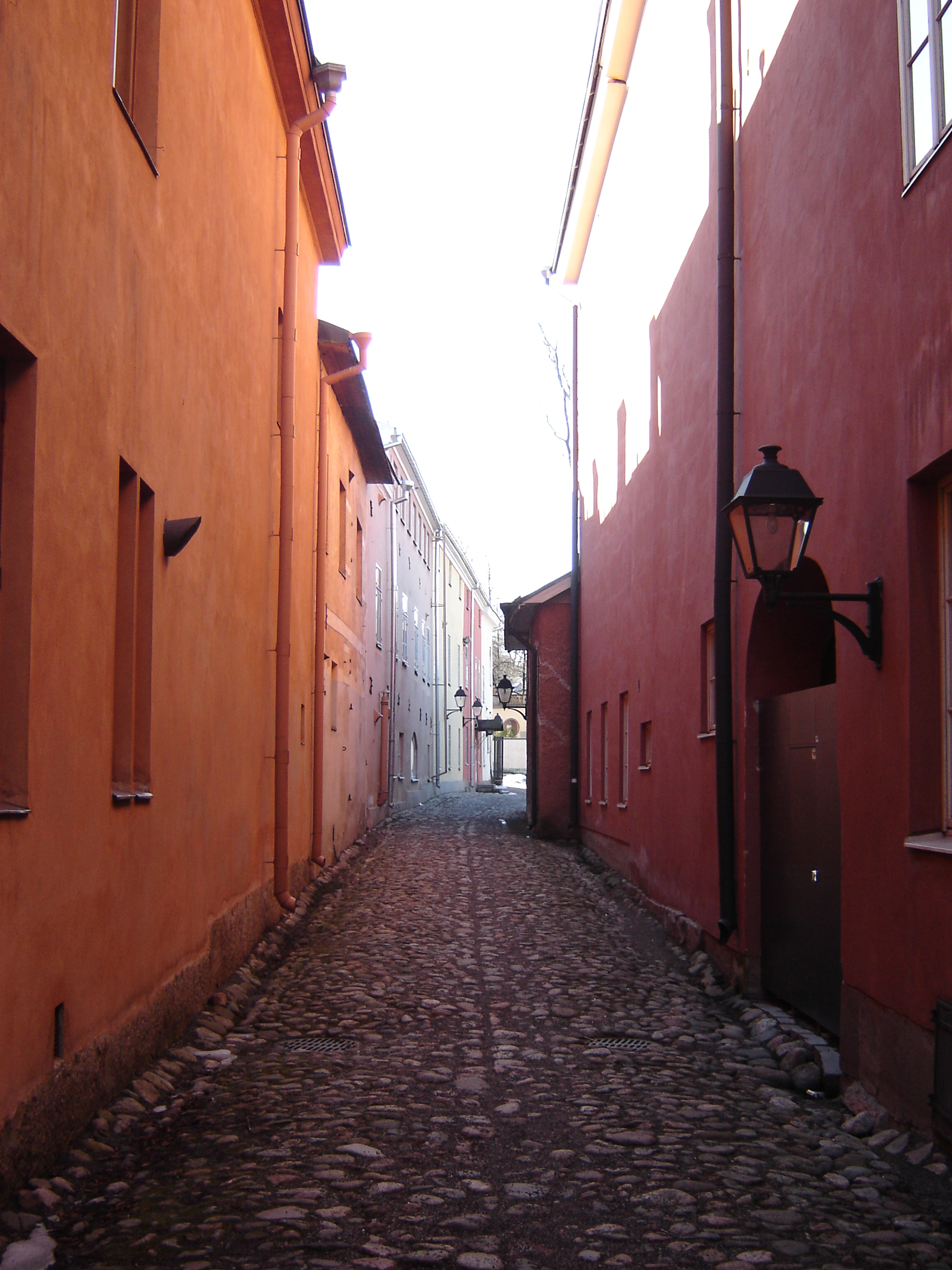
Luostarin Välikatu, located between the Brinkkala Mansion and Katedraalikoulu, functioned as an artery in the Middle Ages leading from the Kaskenmäki Monastery to Turku Cathedral

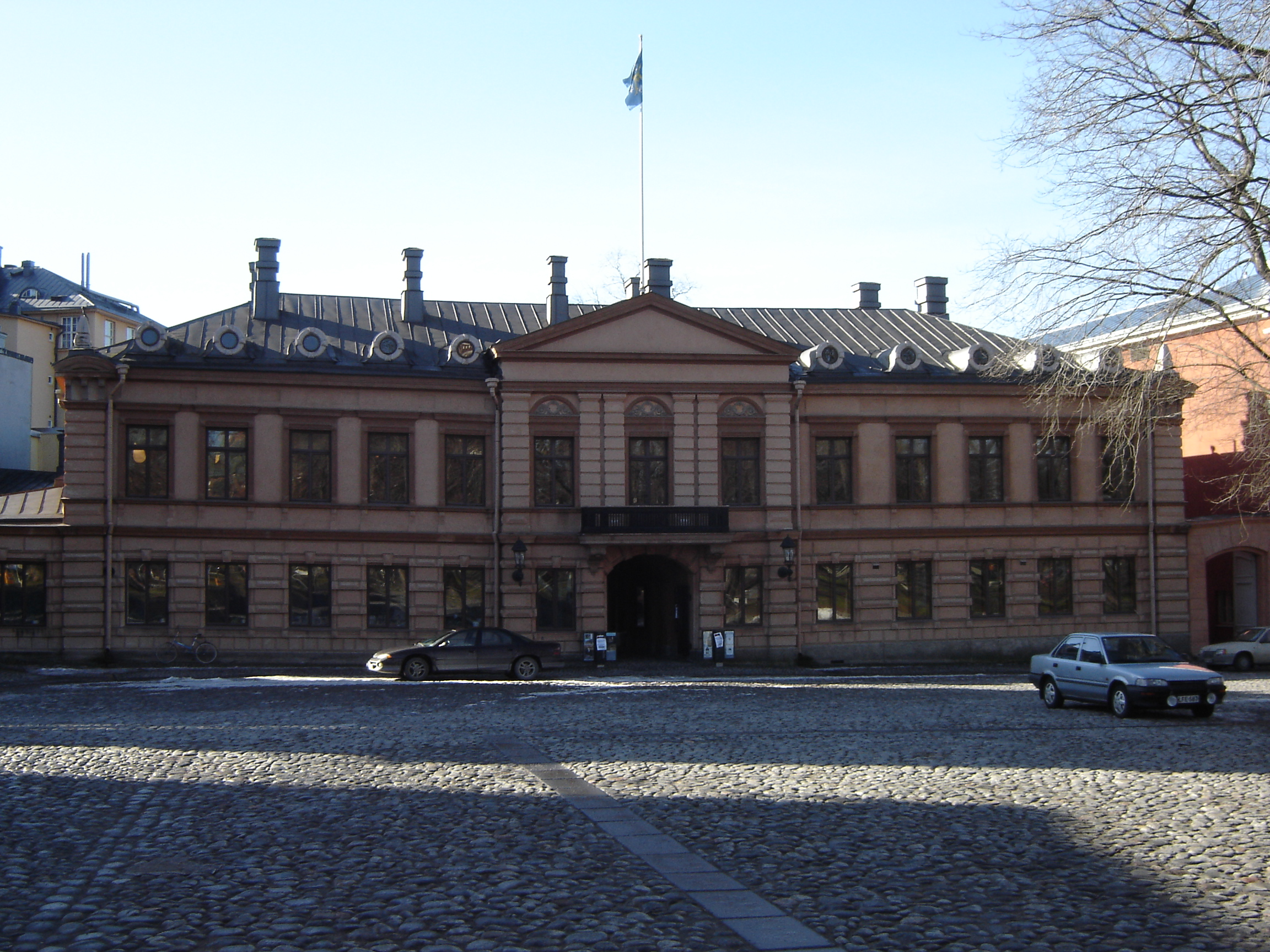
Brinkkala Mansion

=== Brinkkala Mansion ===
The Brinkala Mansion is best known for the traditional proclamation of Christmas Peace, which has been given from the Brinkkala Mansion balcony each Christmas Eve at 12:00 since 1886. Prior to that, Christmas peace was proclaimed from the "doors and windows of the town hall" as the old saying went. The wooden balcony known as the Christmas peace balcony was added to the Brinkkala facade during renovations from 1884 to 1886. The declaration started in the 14th century. The earliest information about the Brinkkala Mansion is from the 16th century when it was a town house of the owner of Brinkhall Manor in Kakskerta. Before its renovations from 1884 to 1886, it was a hotel, town hall and Turku police station. Nowadays, it is a space for art galleries and banquet halls. There is a coffee house located in the courtyard. The Turku Medieval Market also takes place in the courtyard.

=== Old Town Hall ===
It is assumed that the City of Turku administrative centre was headquartered at the Old Town Hall since the 14th century. The most famous of the Turku town halls was the stone building planned by master bricklayer Samuel Berner, finished in 1736. Berner's town hall was destroyed by the fire of 1827, along with its bell tower. A private house was built upon the walls of the badly destroyed building, this house being acquired by factory owner Juselius in the 1850s. The building was redone into a three-story factory in 1899, which was active until the 1920s. In 1932, the building was acquired by the City of Turku, and was for police department use. Nowadays, it is a space for galleries and a banquet hall and concerts.

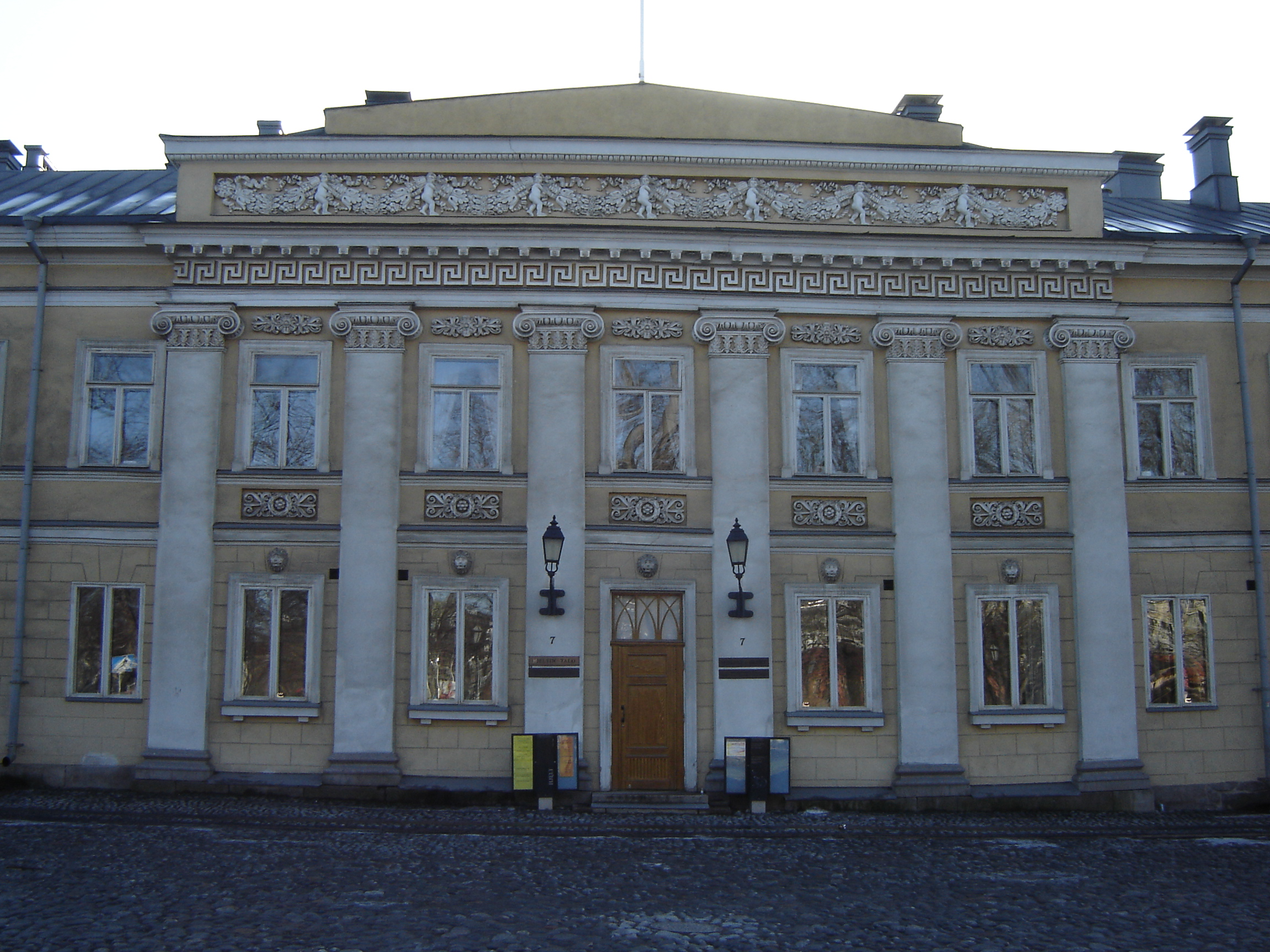
Hjelt Mansion

=== Hjelt Mansion ===
After the fire, Captain Hjelt bought the site along the town square, and built the impressive two-story stone building in 1830. The Hjelt Mansion is the only remaining stone building in Finland which clearly represents the Saint Petersburg empire style. The Hjelt Mansion was taken over by the City of Turku in the 1930s, at which time both stories were used by the police department. After this, the downstairs level was a used as the children's and young adult's section of Turku City Library, and the Turku Cultural Centre worked in the upstairs level. The library section moved to the new building of Turku Main Library and the Turku Cultural Centre moved next door to the Old Town Hall.

Four Baltic Sea organisations moved into the building at the beginning of 2008: UBC Environment and Sustainable Development Secretariat, WHO Healthy Cities, Centrum Balticum and Valonia. The building was officially designated as the Itämeritalo ("Baltic Sea house") on 19 August 2008.

=== Juselius Manor ===
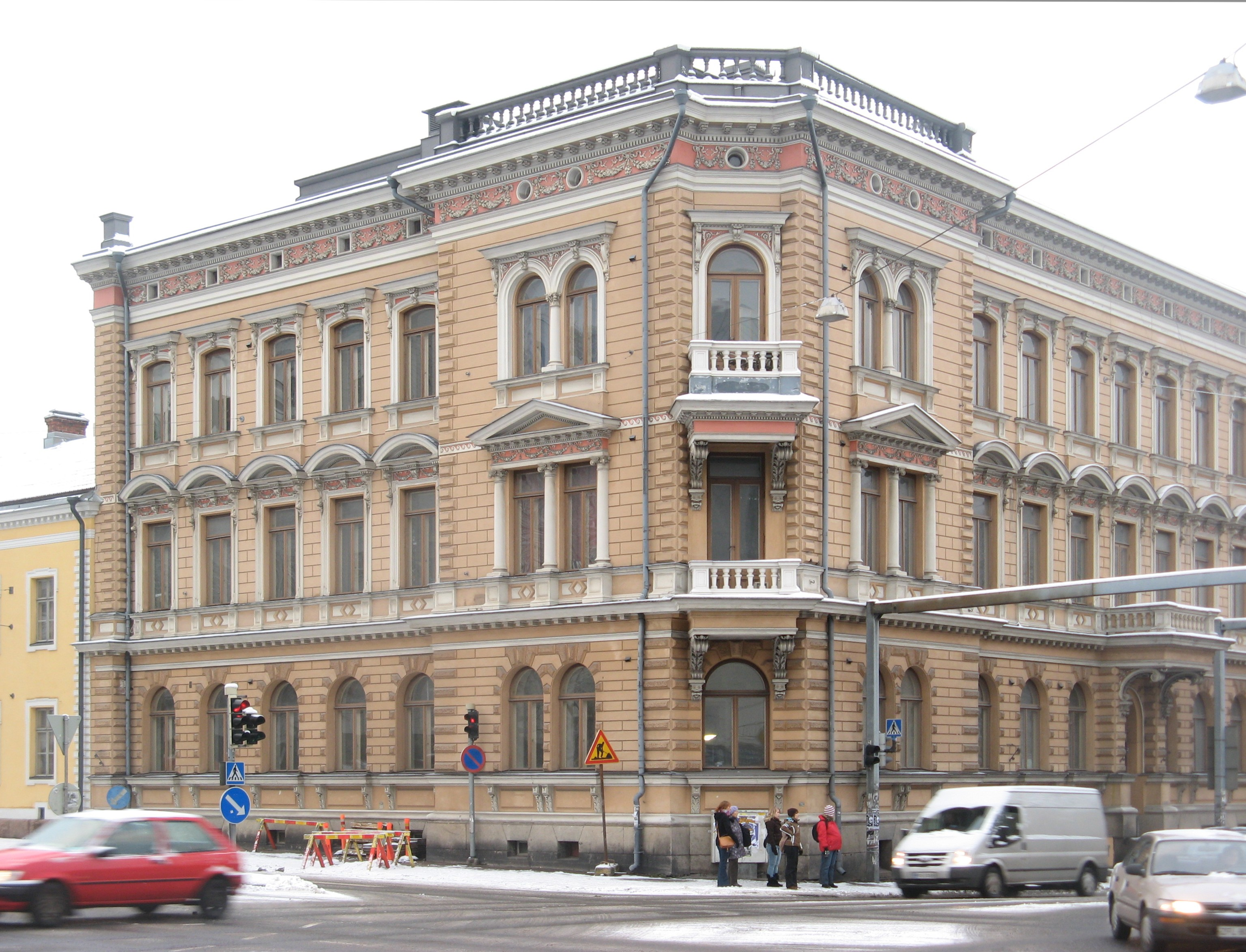
Juselius Mansion

The new renaissance Juselius Mansion is the newest of the buildings in the area. It was built by Carl Fredrik Juselius in 1892, originally as his home. It has been a residential building for city officials, space for the police department and a dociros office. Nowadays, the building is used for other purposes, such as the legendary restaurant Teini.

=== Katedralskolan i Åbo ===
Katedralskolan i Åbo is a Swedish-language senior high school, built after the fire on the foundation of the former Hovrätt by C.L. Engel. Its style is empire. There reportedly was a school under the authority of Turku Cathedral in the Turku city centre in late 13th century called Turun katedraalikoulu.

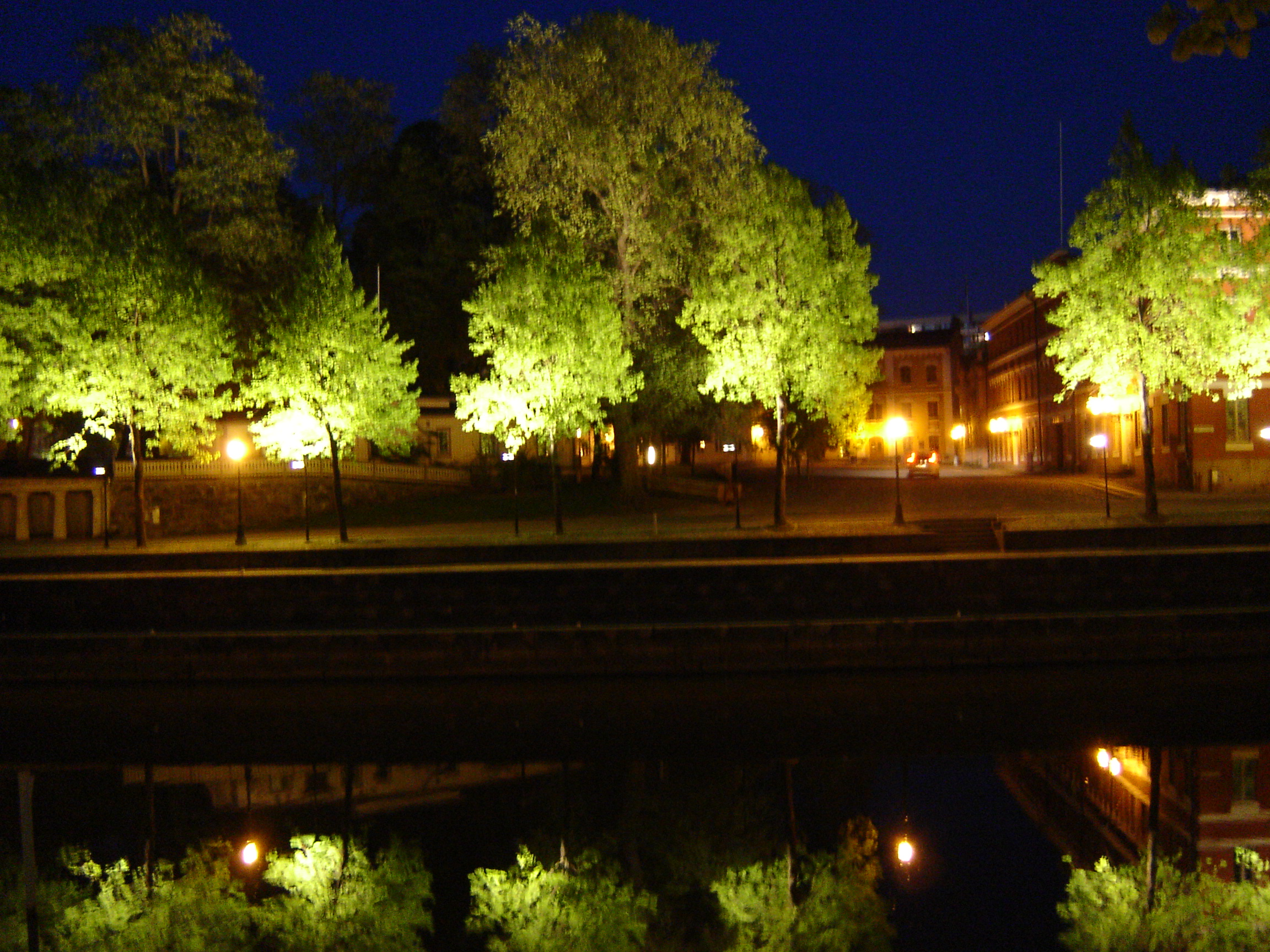
The Old Great Square, taken from Vähätori in front of the Turku Main Library on the other side of the Aura River.

== Events ==
There are different events organised at the Old Great Square throughout the year. Turku Medieval Market is organised in June and July, stretching out to Porthaninpuisto, the courtyard and Luostarin Välikatu. Christmas City events also take place for three weekends as well as events for Turku Night of the Arts.

== Prospects ==
The Old Great Square and its historical surroundings have been designed to be marketed as the old part of the city of Turku. Under EU protection, the idea is to revive the area to a European style by attracting more cafes and restaurants and organising different events at the square and park. Furthermore, a bridge called Pennisilta, to replace the one destroyed by the fire, is due to be built to connect the old part of the city to the traffic centre.

== Gallery ==
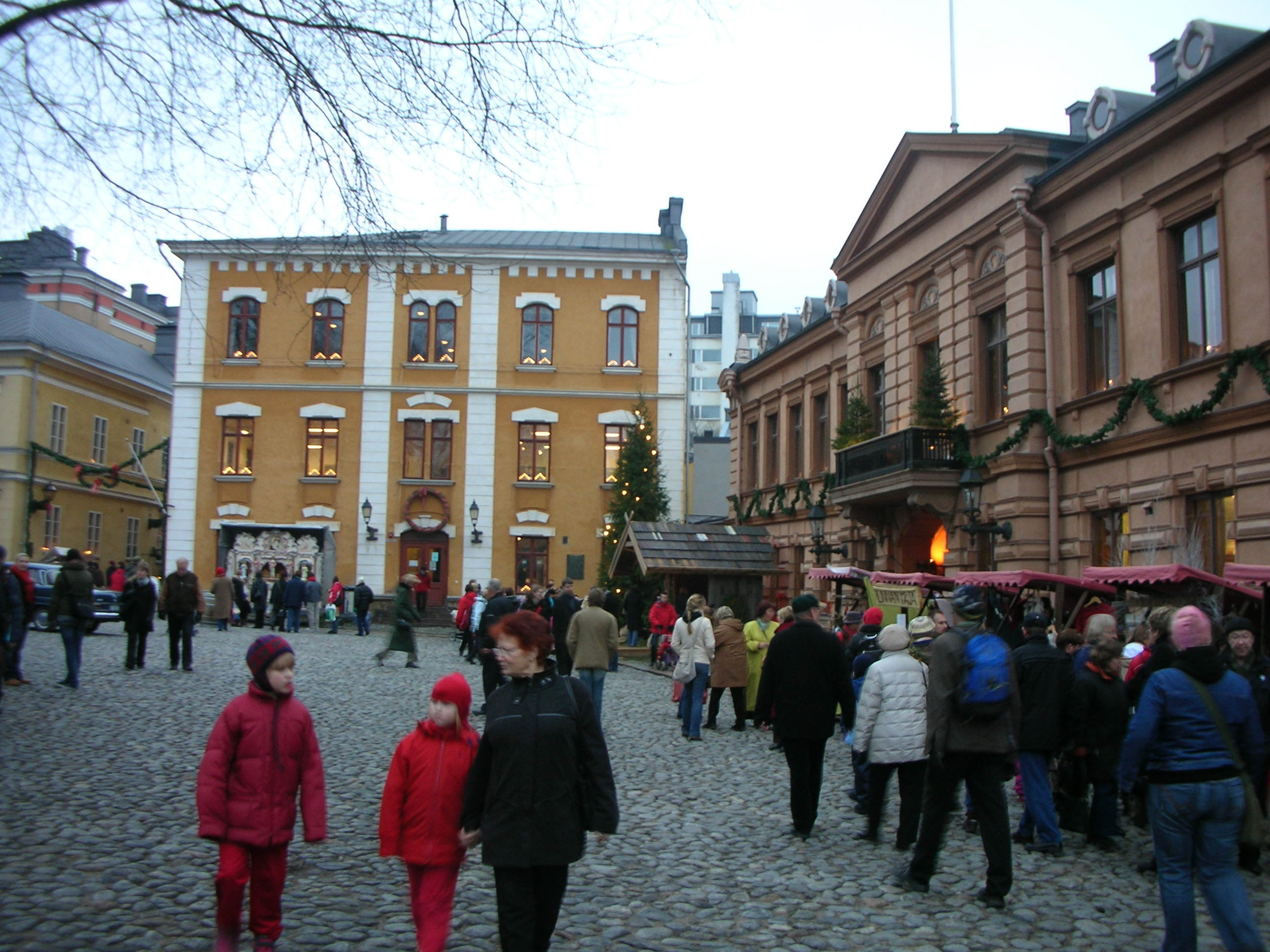
Old Town Hall, Brinkkala Mansion on the right

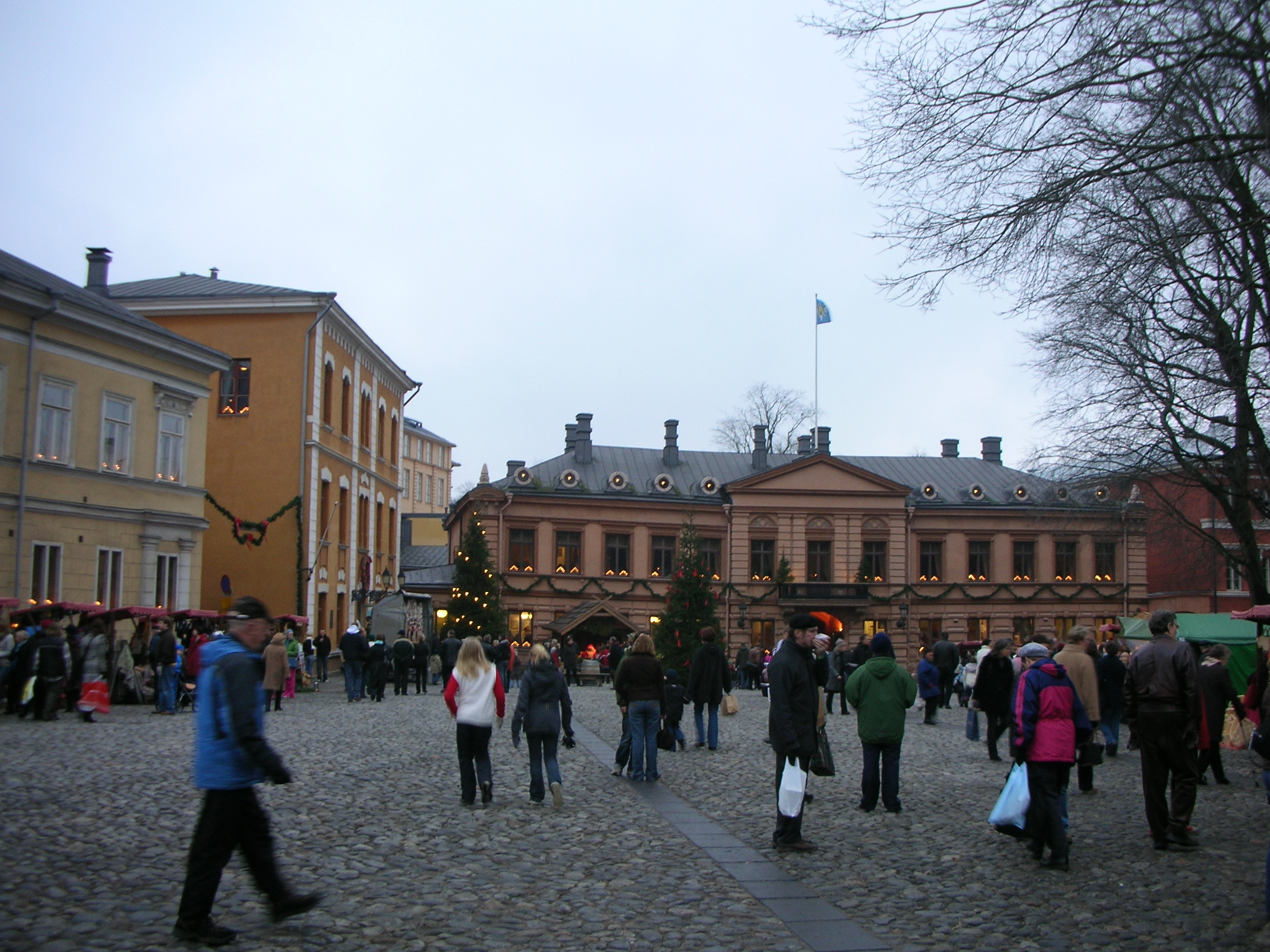
Brinkkala Mansion

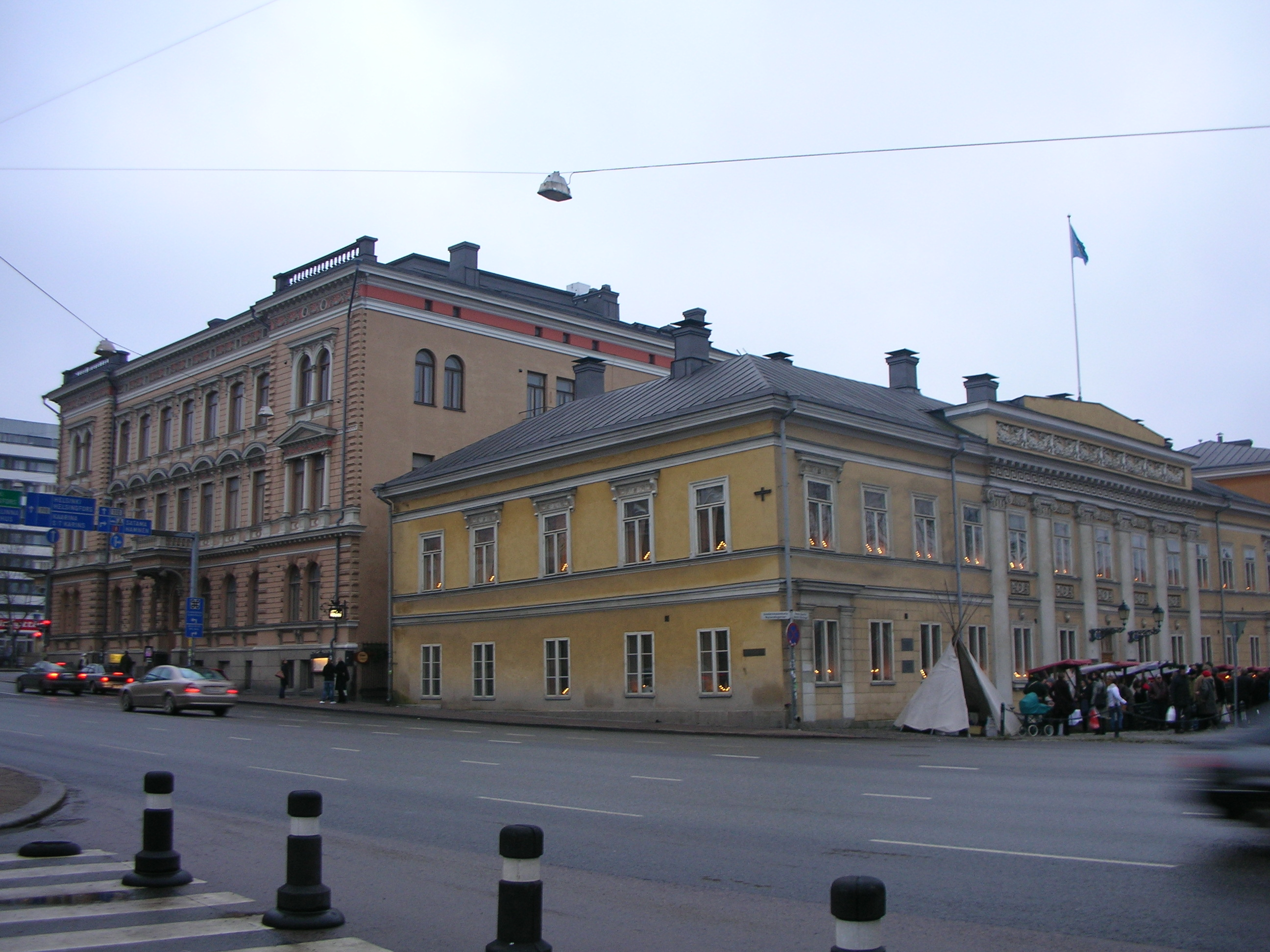
Hjelt Mansion, view from Uudenmaankatu

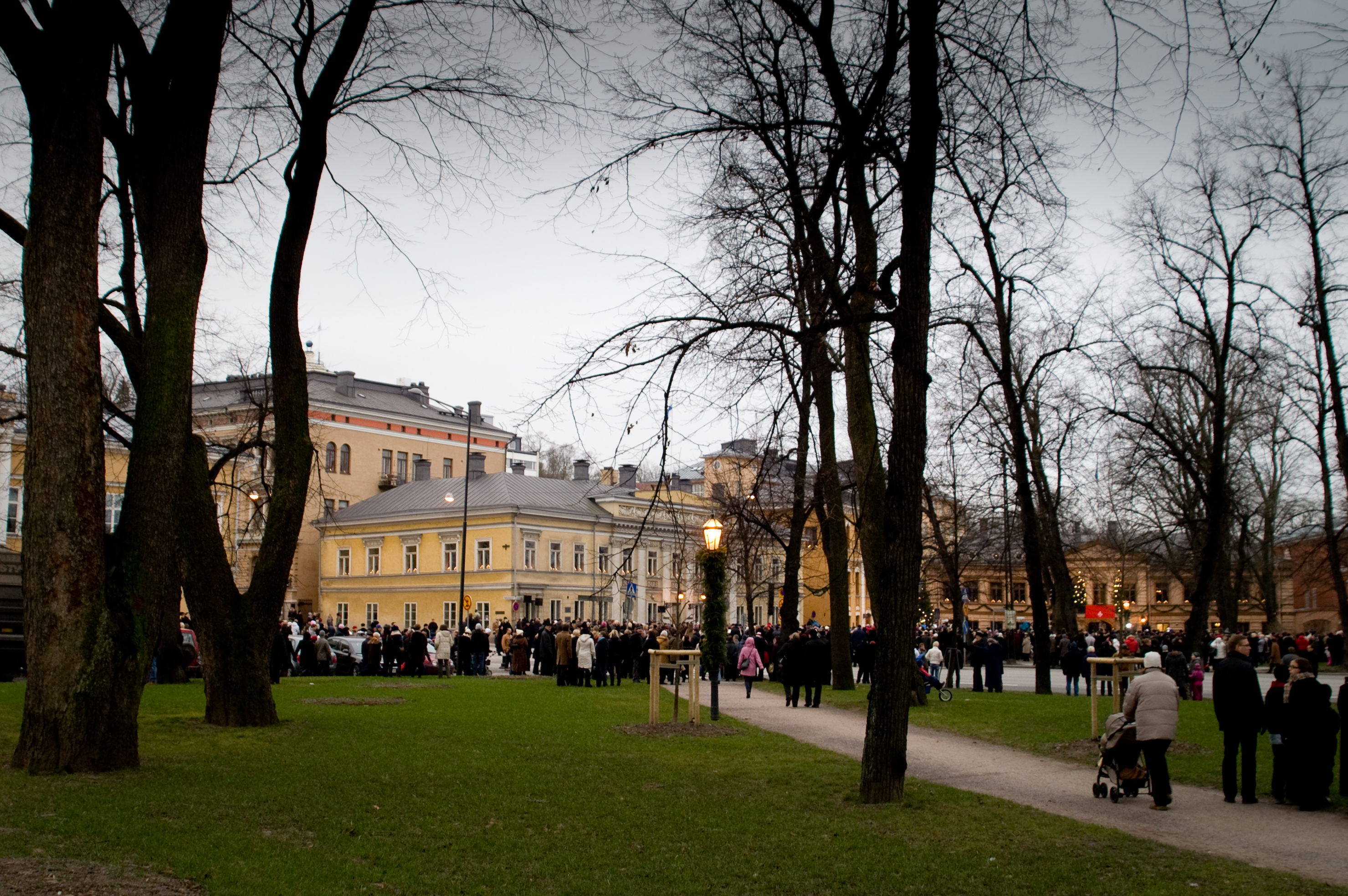
Christmas peace proclamation

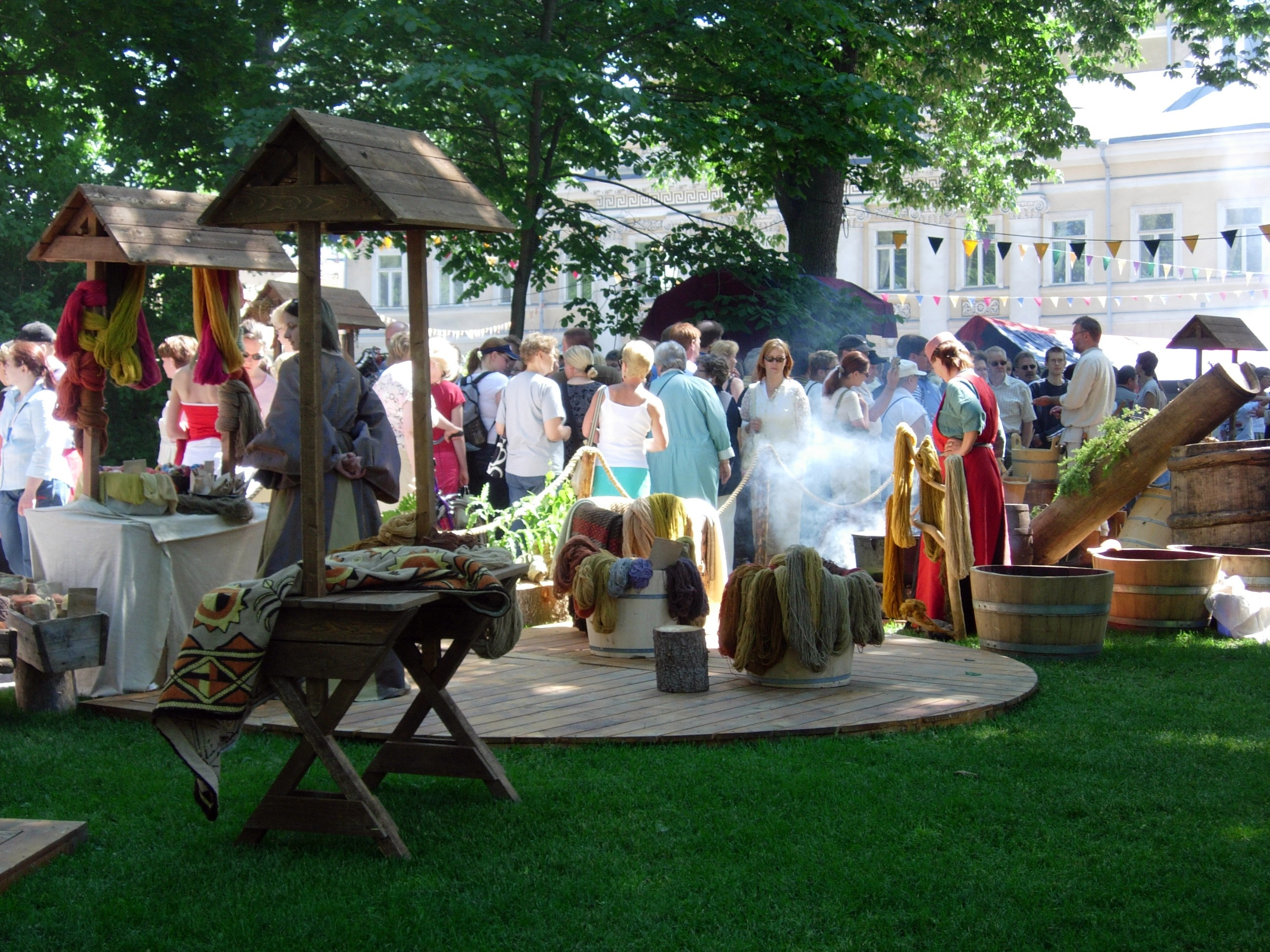
Turku Medieval Market

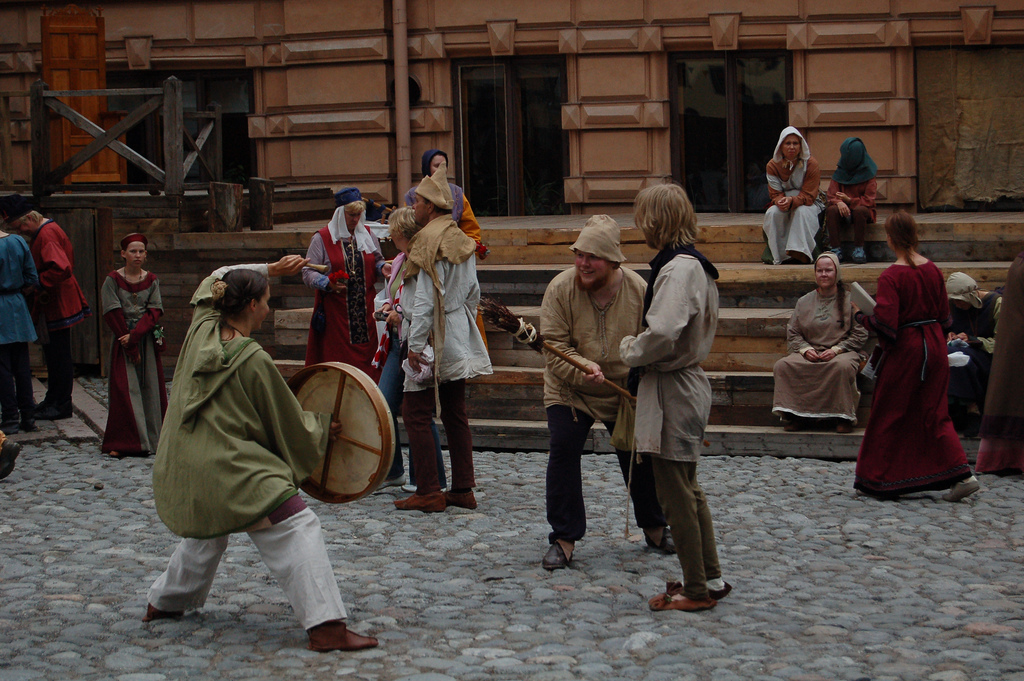
Turku Medieval Market

== See also ==
- Åbo Bloodbath

== Sources ==
- Turun Sanomat
- Turun kaupungin kulttuurikeskus
