= Turku City Library =

Municipal library service in Turku, Finland

- Turun kaupunginkirjasto Åbo stadsbibliotek
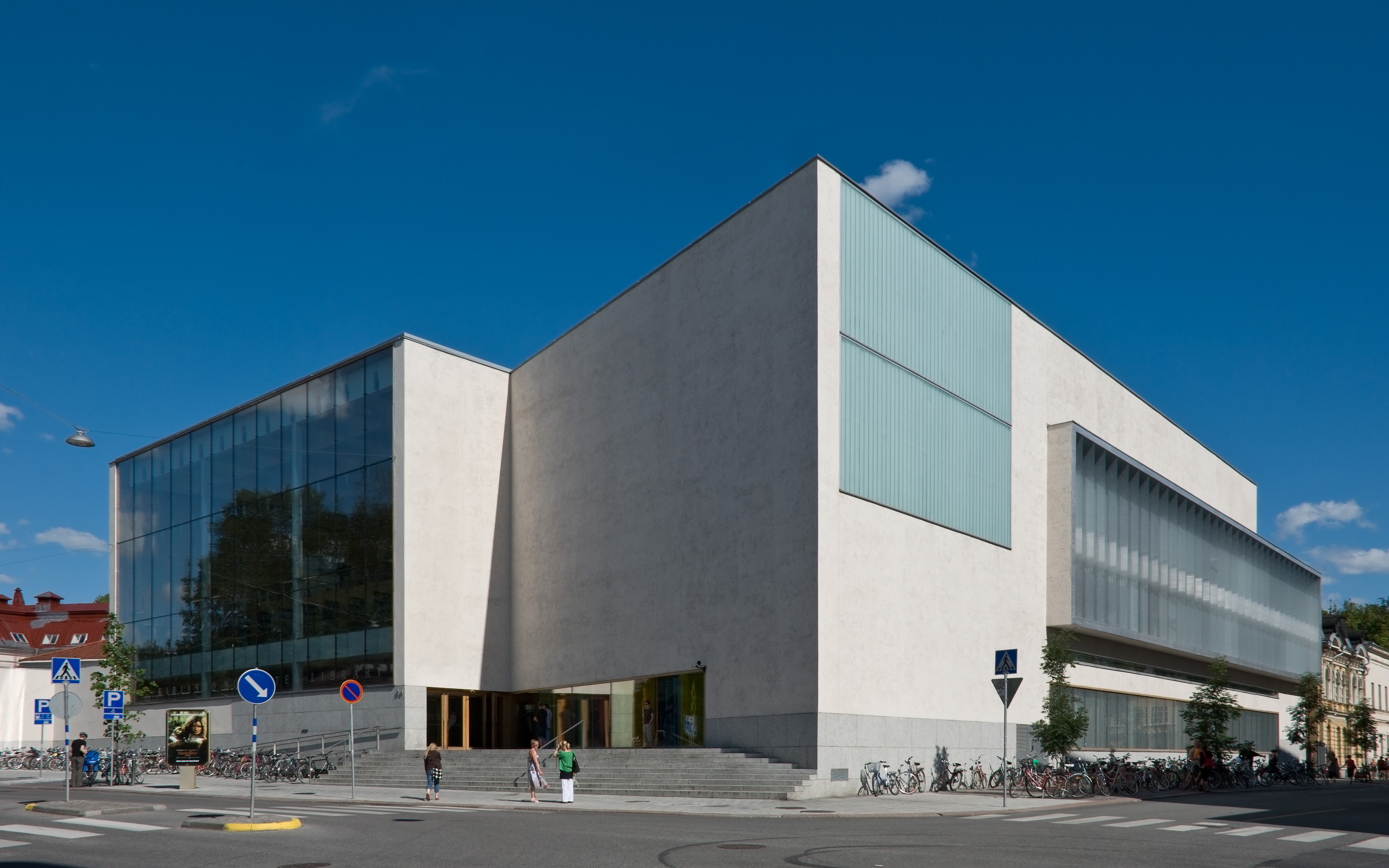
- The new building of the Turku Main Library at the intersection of Linnankatu and Kauppiaskatu.
- 60°27′0.576″N 22°16′18.48″E (Turku Main Library)
- Location: Turku, Finland
- Type: Public library
- Established: 1862
- Branches: 10 + 2 mobile libraries

Collection
- Size: 810 000 (2023)

Access and use
- Access requirements: Open to all
- Circulation: 3,2 million (2023)

Other information
- Budget: 12 million € (2023)
- Director: Rebekka Pilppula
- Parent organisation: City of Turku
- Affiliation: Vaski Libraries
- Website: https://www.turku.fi/en/turku-city-library

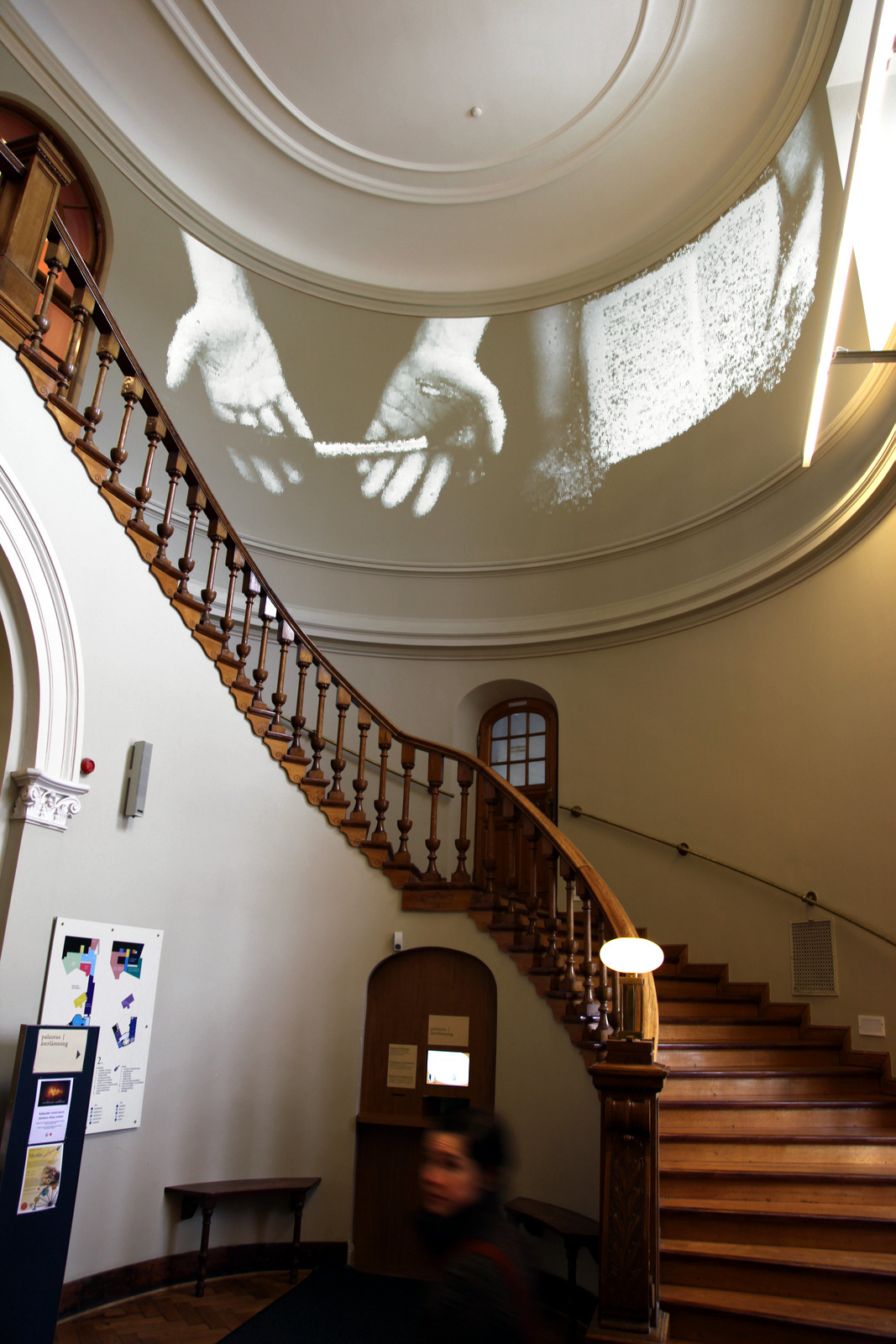
Linnankatu entrance to the old library building and art work 'Sub Rosa' by Charles Sandison.

Turku City Library (Finnish: Turun kaupunginkirjasto, Swedish: Åbo stadsbibliotek) is a municipal public library in Turku. The Main Library is located in the VI District at the city centre. The Turku City Library also operates several branch libraries and two mobile libraries. It is part of the Vaski library network, which is a consolidation of 18 public libraries in the Southwest Finland region.

The library traces its roots to the 1860s, when a privately funded people's library and an academic oriented city library were established in Turku. The municipality of Turku soon took over operating both libraries, and in 1912 they were merged to form the Turku City Library.

The Turku City Library is a regionally significant library and one of the largest public libraries in Finland. It has had a regional development responsibility in the regions of Finland Proper and Satakunta since 2018.

== History ==
=== The People's Library and the City Library (1862–1912) ===
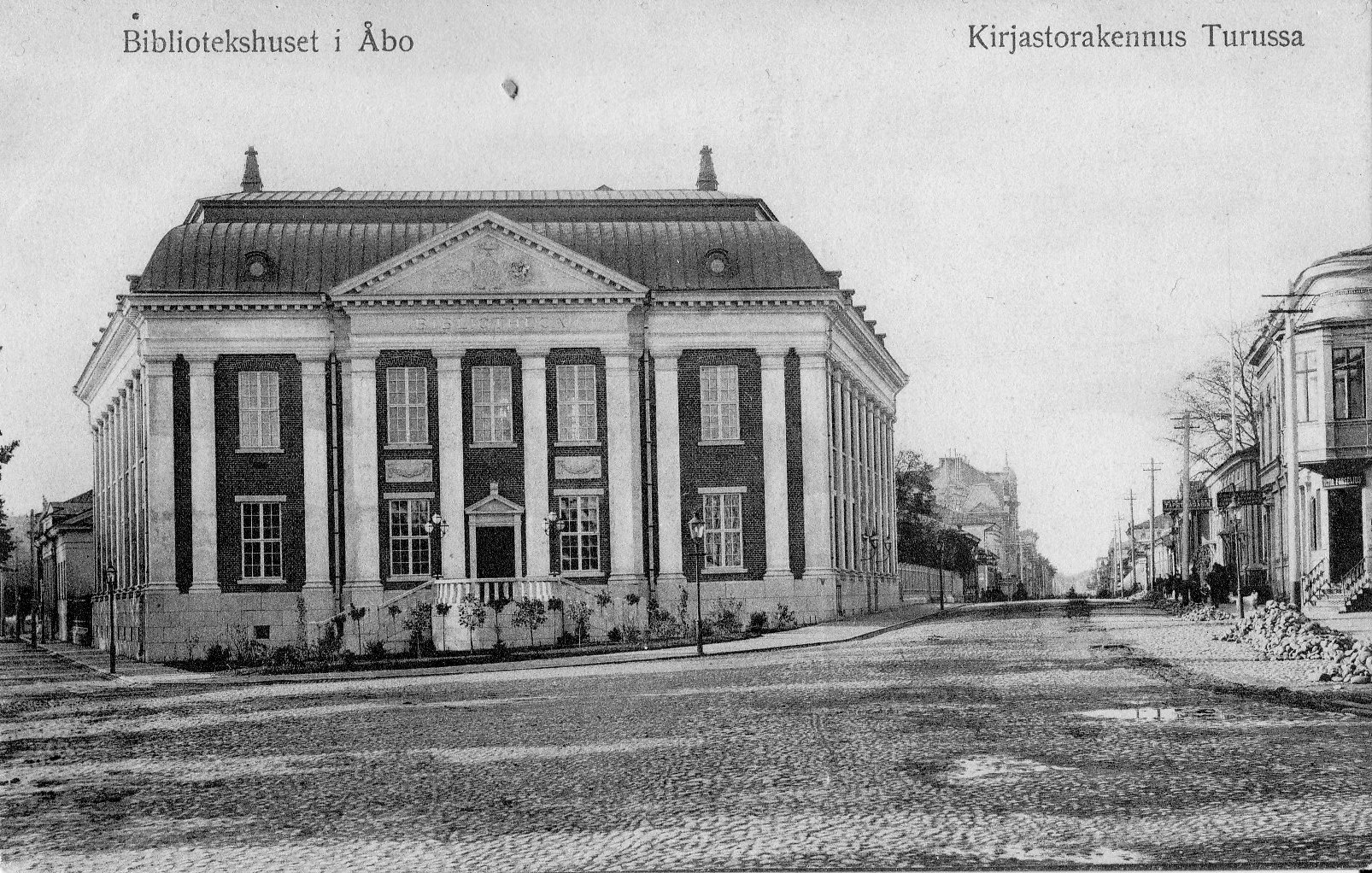
The old building of the Main Library before 1924.

The Turku City Library traces its roots to the 1860s, when two privately funded libraries were established in Turku: a people's library for the working class and an academic oriented city library for the educated classes. The People's Library (Finnish: Turun kansankirjasto) was established in 1862, and it operated at the beginning in the house of a factory owner's wife. The library was open only a couple of hours a week, and each customer was allowed to loan just one book at a time, because there were only around one thousand books in the collection. Loaning was free, but there was a voluntary annual fee of one mark. However, the People's Library was soon in financial troubles, and it was even temporarily closed for a short period at the beginning of the 1870s. The financial situation improved when the city of Turku took over the management of the library in 1878.

After the Great Fire of Turku in 1827 the Royal Academy of Turku was moved to Helsinki. Also the library of the Royal Academy was moved, after which there was no more an academic library in Turku. For this reason an academic oriented City Library (Finnish: Turun kaupunginkirjasto) was established for the city's educated classes in 1869. Also the City Library was soon in financial difficulties, and the city of Turku took over its operations in 1891.

Around 1900 the premises of both libraries were getting too small. The situation eased when the local businessman and patron Fredric von Rettig donated a new library building for the city. In addition to the building, von Rettig also donated 10 000 books, an art collection, and a considerable sum of money for the maintenance of the libraries. The architect of the new library building was Fredric von Rettig's own son-in-law Karl August Wrede. The building was designed in the style of Dutch late Renaissance, and the immediate model for it was the House of Nobility in Stockholm. The People's Library moved to the new building's ground floor, whereas the City Library moved to the first floor. The entrance to the City Library was from the main door, but the entrance to the People's Library was from a side door by Linnankatu.

The People's Library and the City Library, both already located in the same building, were formally merged in 1912. The name of the new library was Turku City Library (Finnish: Turun kaupunginkirjasto, Swedish: Åbo stadsbibliotek). The ground floor of the former people's library was changed into the library's general department, whereas the first floor was transformed into the library's educational department.

=== Growth and modernization (1913–1970) ===
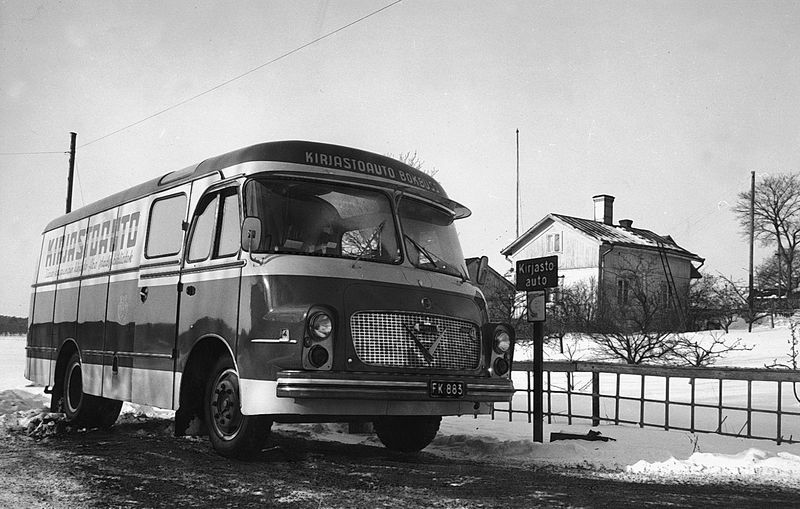
Bookmobile in Pikisaari in the 1960s.

During the 1910s American ideas about the development of public libraries started to take root also in Turku. Einar Holmberg, who worked as a librarian in the Turku City Library, brought new and radical ideas with him from his travels in England and the United States. Very soon these new ideas and notions were put into practice in Turku. Most of the modifications and reforms were ready by 1914. The Turku City Library implemented open collections, free loans for everyone, long opening hours, a children's department, and a modern classification system. The separate men's and women's reading rooms on the ground floor were combined, and newspapers were attached to racks from which the patrons could read them while standing. The side door by Linnankatu was also closed permanently, after which everyone entered the library from the main door. The rules of use were revised so that loaning became entirely free, and every resident had the right to loan books. This meant that the library was developing even more clearly towards a universal public library, because the number of patrons and loans increased significantly. However, The First World War and the Finnish Civil War marked an ending to the library's progressive period: the author Volter Kilpi, who started as a librarian in the Turku City Library in 1919, found the library in a state of degradation. During Kilpi's management the library slowly began to recover, but after a few years Kilpi left his post to start working at the recently established Turku University Library.

The Turku City Library was a pioneer in patron counselling. Already in 1933 the library established a special help desk for the patrons, which was inspired by a similar service at the Stockholm Public Library. There had been a reading room for newspapers in the old People's Library since the year 1878, and during the 20th century the newspaper and magazine services were further developed and expanded. Already in 1907 a separate reading room for newspapers was established by Sofiankatu, and later on even more reading rooms for newspapers were established. At best, there were a total of four different reading rooms for newspapers and magazines. Also children's library services were developed diligently from early on. Children had had their own reading room already in the premises of the People's Library, but it soon proved inadequate and too small. The children got their own department during the alterations of 1914. Children and young adults have since been active users of the library.

The library network of Turku started to expand after the Second World War. The first branch library was formed in 1939, when the former public library of Kaarina became the Nummi loaning station after a portion of the municipality of Kaarina was merged into Turku. The library network expanded slowly when new branch libraries were established in different parts of the city. Turku also had the first mobile library in Finland, which started operating in 1961. The music library was opened on the first floor of the Main Library in 1970.

=== The new main library (1971–) ===
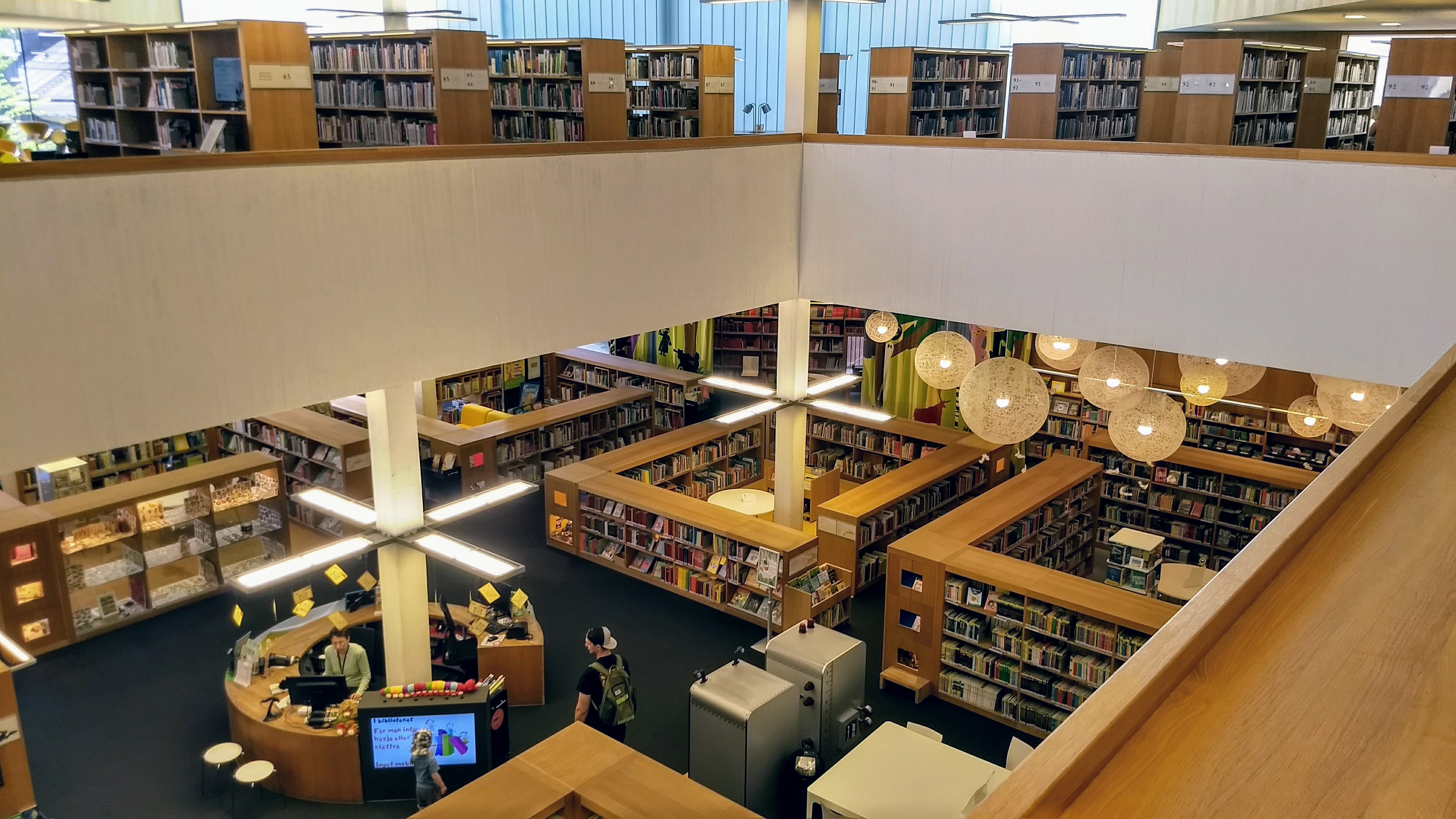
Interior of the new Main Library building.

In the course of the 20th century the Main Library was getting too small and impractical for the demands of the quickly developing library services. For this reason many of the departments of the Main Library had to be distributed in different locations. Already in the beginning of the 1970s the music department was moved to the former residence of the provincial governor by Läntinen Rantakatu. In 1990 the library's four different reading rooms for newspapers and magazines were combined and located under same roof in the Julin House by Eerikinkatu. Due to lack of space also the children's department had to be relocated in 1991 to the Hjelt House at the Old Great Square where it operated until 2007.

Beginning from the early 1980s the library had tried to find a feasible solution to the lack of space. In 2003 the City Council finally decided on constructing a new building for the Main Library that was to be located right next to the old building. The design competition for the new library building was won by JKMM Architects, and the construction was completed in 2007. The children's department, the reading room and the music department could now once again be housed under the same roof as the other departments. Today the Main Library consists of the old library building and the new library building which are connected by a corridor by Linnankatu. In addition to these, the Main Library also has meeting rooms and a café in the former chancellery of the provincial governor located in the inner courtyard of the library.

Some of the branch libraries have been closed during the 21st century. The Martti Library and the Mikael Library were closed in 2009, and the Lauste Library ceased operation in 2019. The library’s service center at the Skanssi shopping mall was closed in 2023. Many of the branch libraries have been converted to self-service libraries, which means that they can be used also when there is no staff present. Self-service has somewhat increased the use of these branch libraries.

== Branches ==
In addition to the Main Library, the Turku City Library also includes ten branch libraries and two mobile libraries. Aunela, Hirvensalo, Ilpoinen, Nummi, Paattinen, Runosmäki, Vasaramäki and Yli-Maaria libraries are also self-service libraries, that can be used independently with a library card and an attached pincode.

Library	Address	Coordinates	Image	Web link
Aunela Library	Opintie 1, 20210 Turku	60.45715°N 22.20016°E		Aunela Community Centre
Hirvensalo Library	Vanha Kakskerrantie 8, 20900 Turku	60.42013°N 22.22652°E		Syvälahti Community Centre
Ilpoinen Library	Lauklähteenkatu 13, 20740 Turku	60.42462°N 22.28362°E		Ilpoinen Library
The Main Library	Linnankatu 2, 20100 Turku	60.45036°N 22.27085°E		The Main Library
Nummi Library	Töykkälänkatu 22, 20540 Turku	60.46064°N 22.30730°E		Nummi Library
Paattinen Library	Toffinkuja 2, 21330 Paattinen	60.59175°N 22.38030°E		Paattinen Library
Pansio Library	Pernontie 29, 20240 Turku	60.45022°N 22.16773°E		Pansio Library
Runosmäki Library	Piiparinpolku 13, 20360 Turku	60.48829°N 22.26076°E		Runosmäki Library
Varissuo Library	Nisse Kavon katu 3, 20610 Turku	60.44274°N 22.36064°E		Varissuo Library
Vasaramäki Library	Lehmustie 7 b, 20720 Turku	60.43661°N 22.29748°E		Vasaramäki Library
Yli-Maaria Library	Kukkamaariankatu 44, 20400 Turku	60.54341°N 22.32001°E		Ypsilon Community Centre in Yli-Maaria

== Statistics ==
The following statistics of the Turku City Library are from the year 2023:

- Loans: 3.2 million
- Visitors: 1.75 million
- Collection size: 810 000 items
- Acquisitions: 55 000 items
- Removals: 54 000 items
- Events: 1 875
- Man-years: 155
- Expenses: 12 million Euro

== See also ==
- List of libraries in Finland
