= Medieval Market of Turku =

Turku Medieval Market Turun keskiaikaiset markkinat
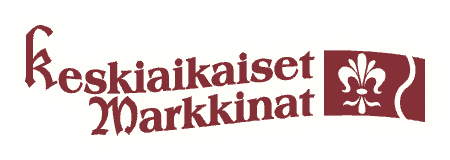
- Medieval Market of Turku logo

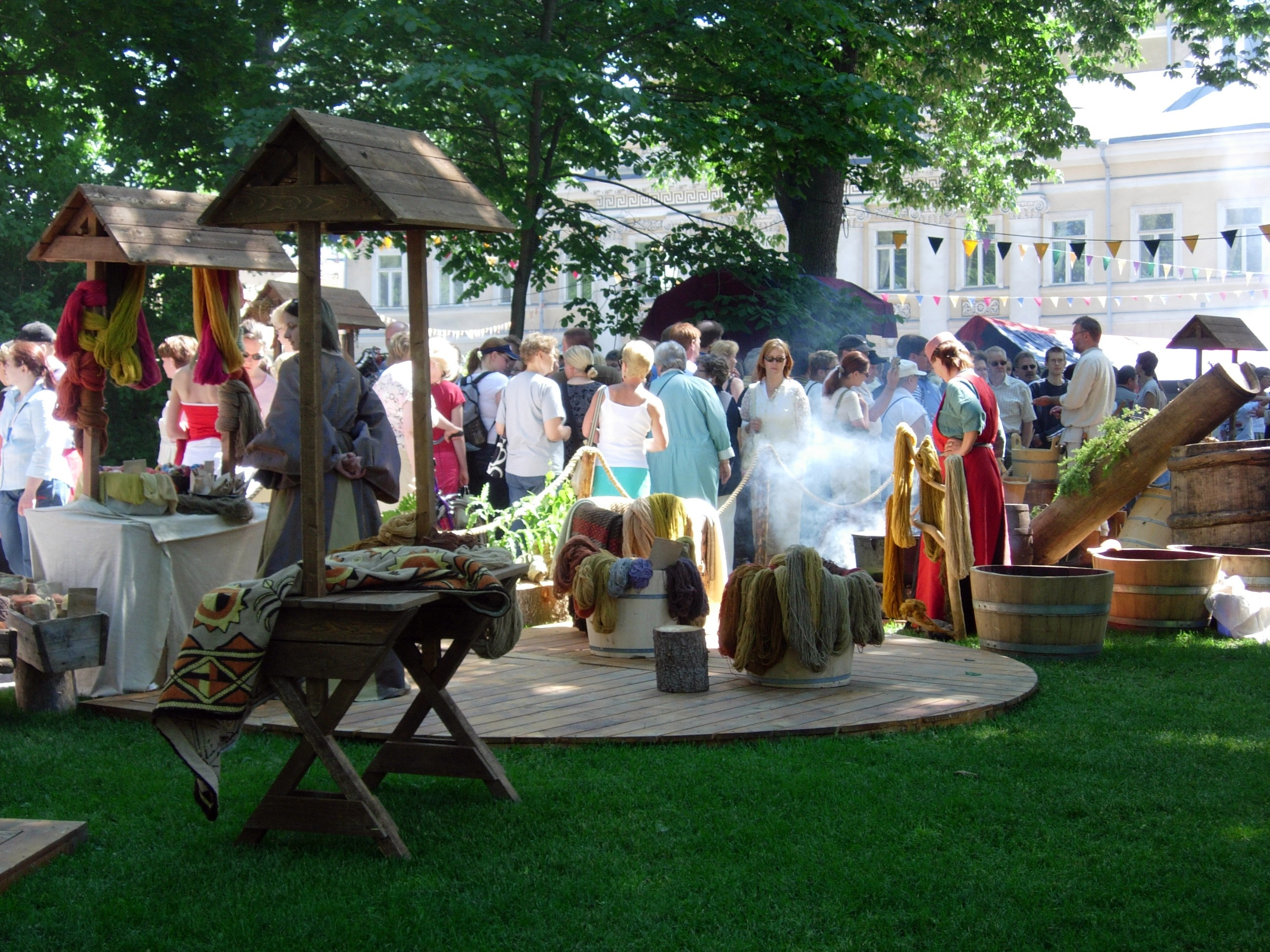
- Booths at the Turku Medieval Market
- Status: Active
- Genre: Historical reenactment event
- Date: From the end of June to the beginning of July
- Frequency: Annually
- Venue: Old Great Square
- Location: Turku
- Coordinates: 60°27′3″N 22°16′33″E
- Country: Finland
- Years active: 30
- Inaugurated: June 30, 1996
- Previous event: 2022
- Next event: 2023
- Participants: 180,000 (2015)
- Organiser: Turun Suurtorin keskiaika ry
- Website: Official web page

The Medieval Market of Turku (Finnish: Turun keskiaikaiset markkinat, Swedish: Åbo medeltidsmarknad) is an annual historical reenactment event organised in the historic city centre of Turku, Finland. Admission to the event is free. In addition to living history performances, it includes an open-air handicrafts market with vendors and even visitors garbed in period costume. The main market is at the Old Great Square (one of the city's oldest market squares), but there are other performances and exhibitions at Turku Castle, Turku Cathedral and at the Aboa Vetus & Ars Nova Museum. Together these different performances and exhibitions form the Medieval Turku event, which is organized in unison by Turun Suurtorin keskiaika ry, the Museum Centre of Turku, the Aboa Vetus & Ars Nova museum, Rohan Stables and Turku and Kaarina Parish Union. These areas are closed to traffic during the event.

== History ==
The event, held in late June, has been organized since 1996, and is constantly growing in popularity. In 2005, it drew in approximately 100,000 visitors, and employed over 100 voluntary and professional actors and actresses.

The Town Market of the Hanseatic merchant, "Laurentius" was organized by the Aboa Vetus & Ars Nova Museum till 2013. Since then, the museum has focused on presenting medieval times through guided tours, lectures and archeological digs.

More recently, the visitor amounts of the market have climbed to 180,000, and they now compete with the most popular summertime events in Finland, such as Ruisrock (93,000 visitors) or Pori Jazz (150,000 visitors).

This market went virtual in 2020.

== Gallery ==
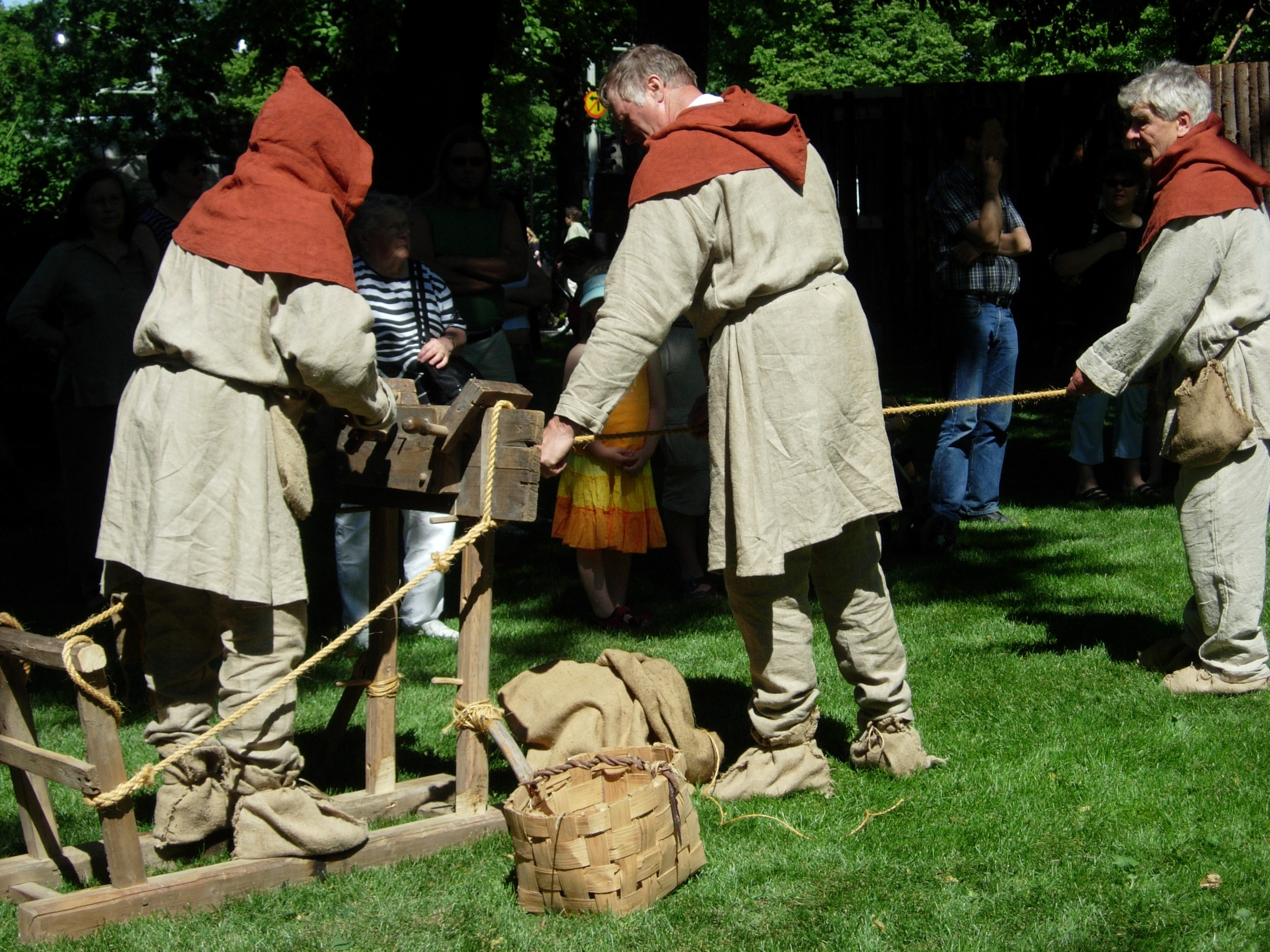
Rope twisting 2005

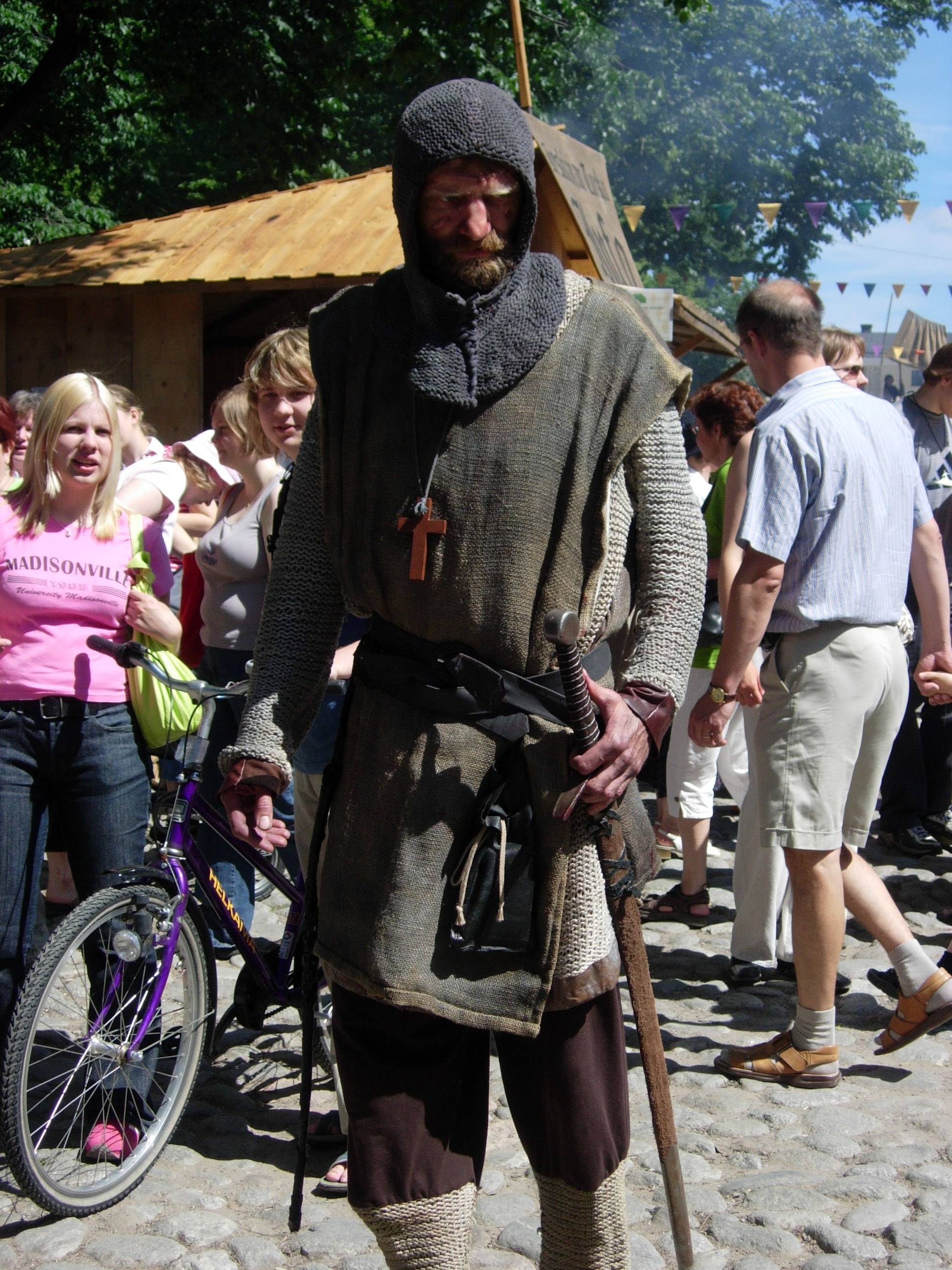
Voluntary actor as a soldier 2005

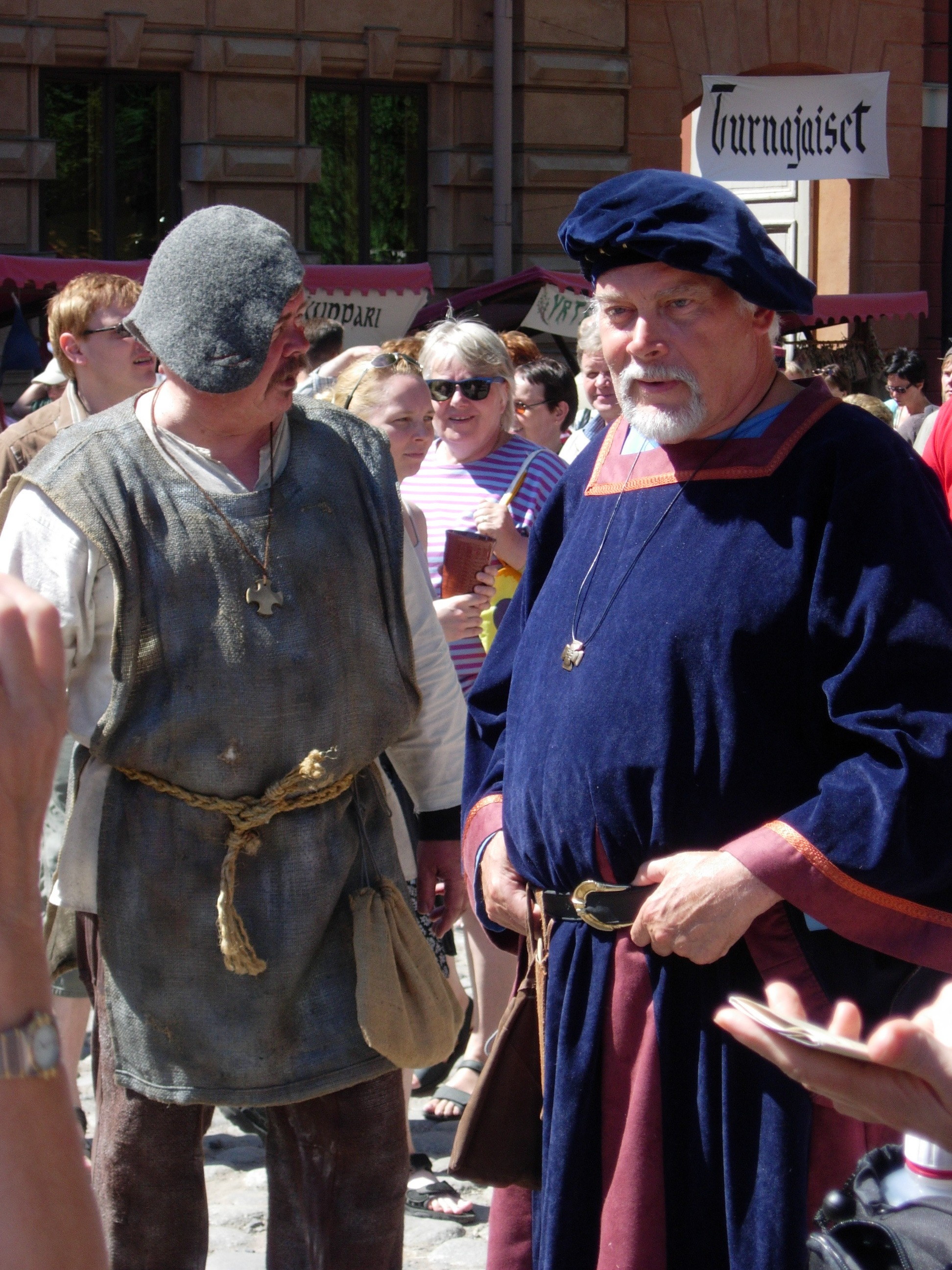
Voluntary actors as members of the bourgeois 2005

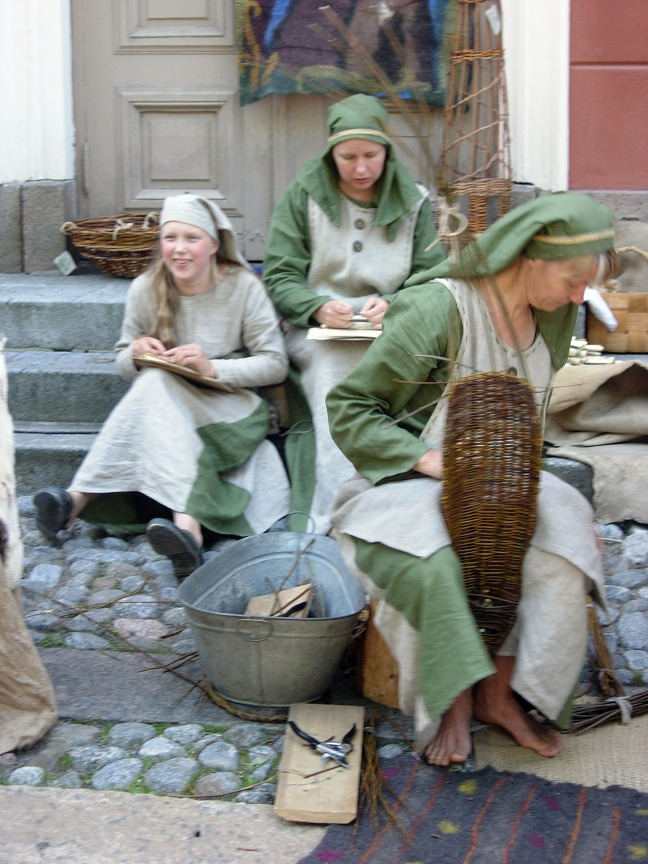
Handicrafts 2005

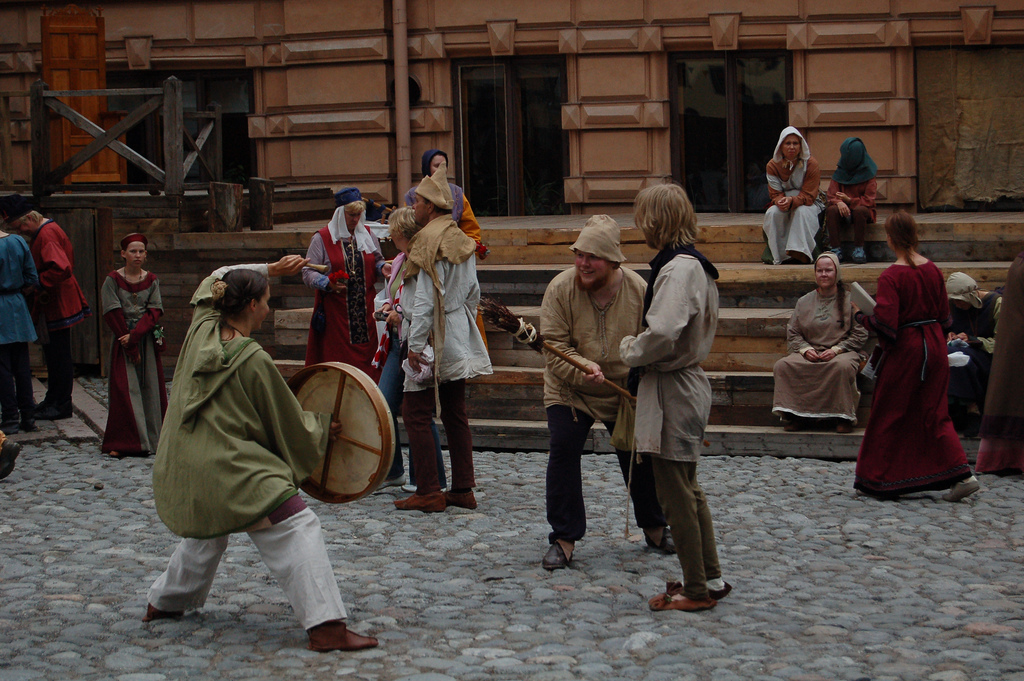
Turku Medieval Market 2006

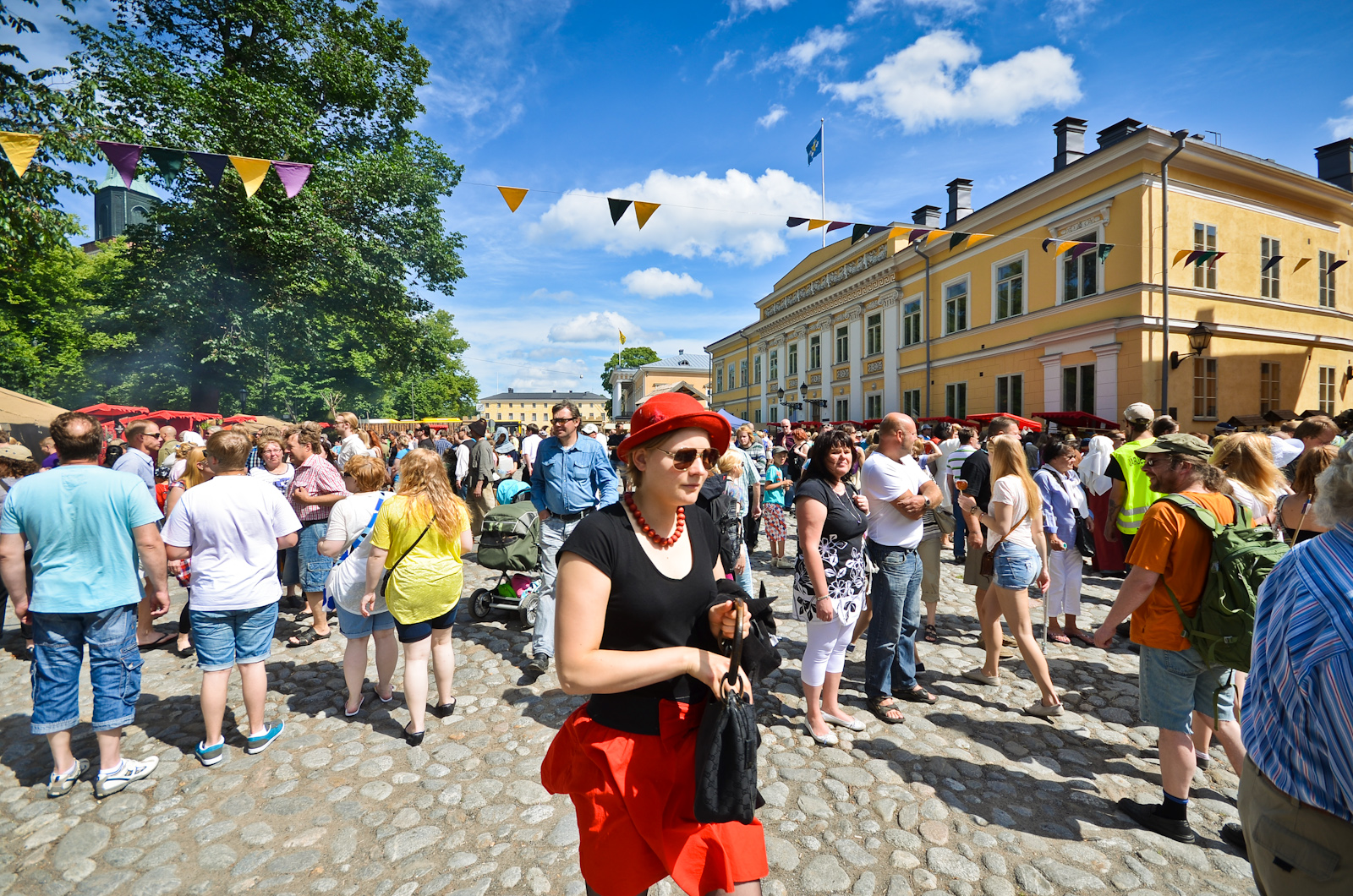
Market visitors 2012

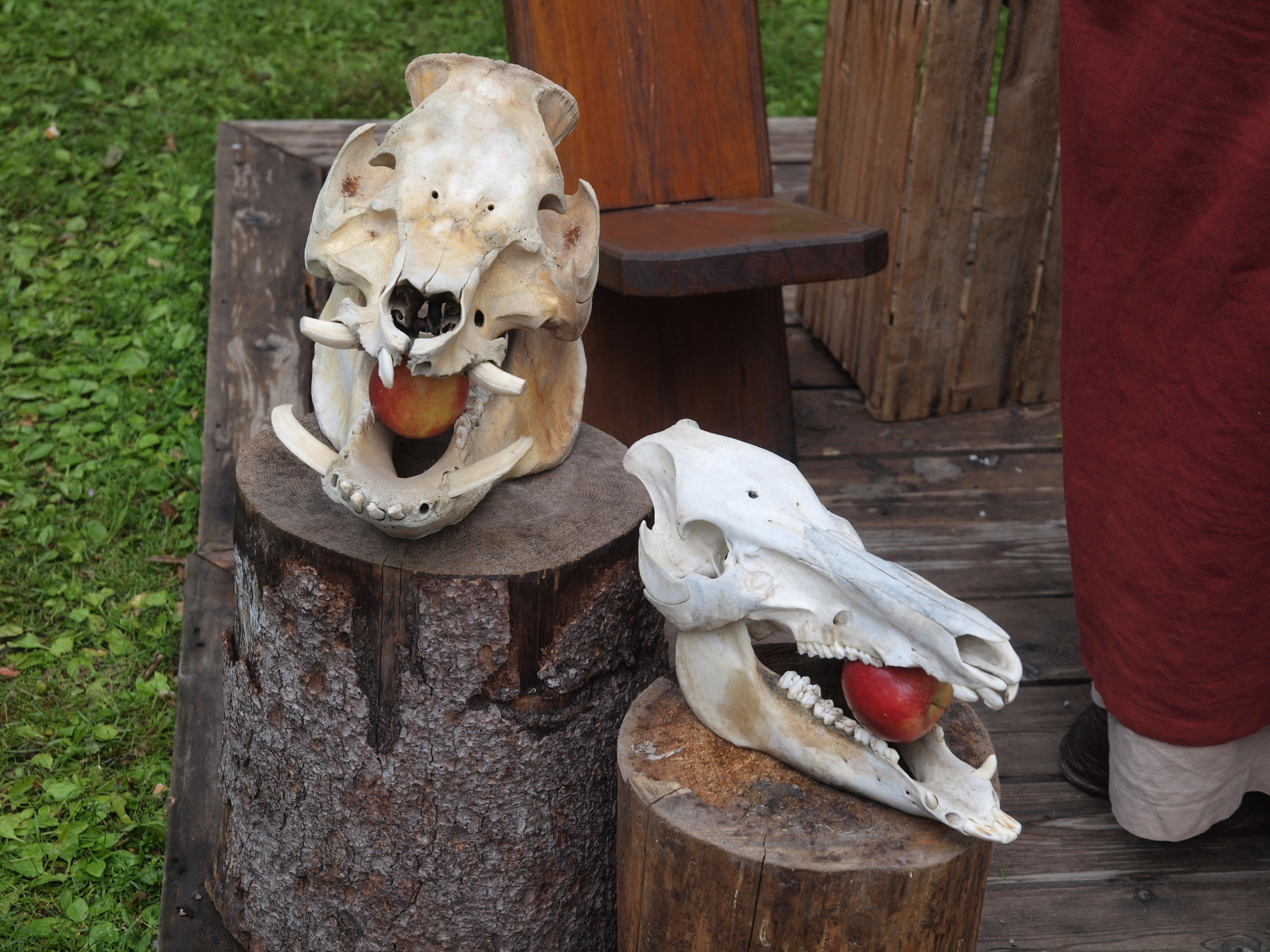
Animal skulls 2015

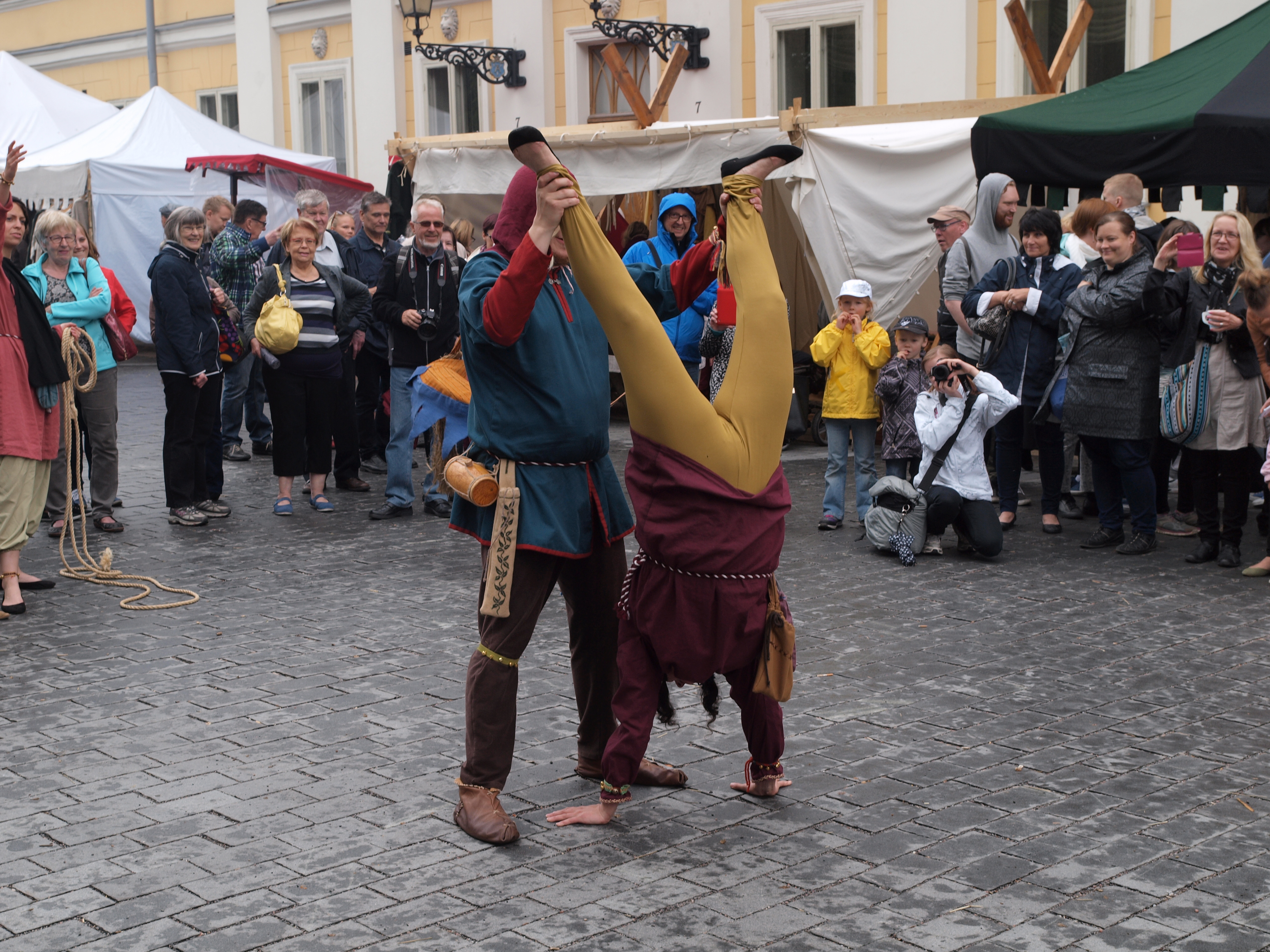
Acrobatic show 2015

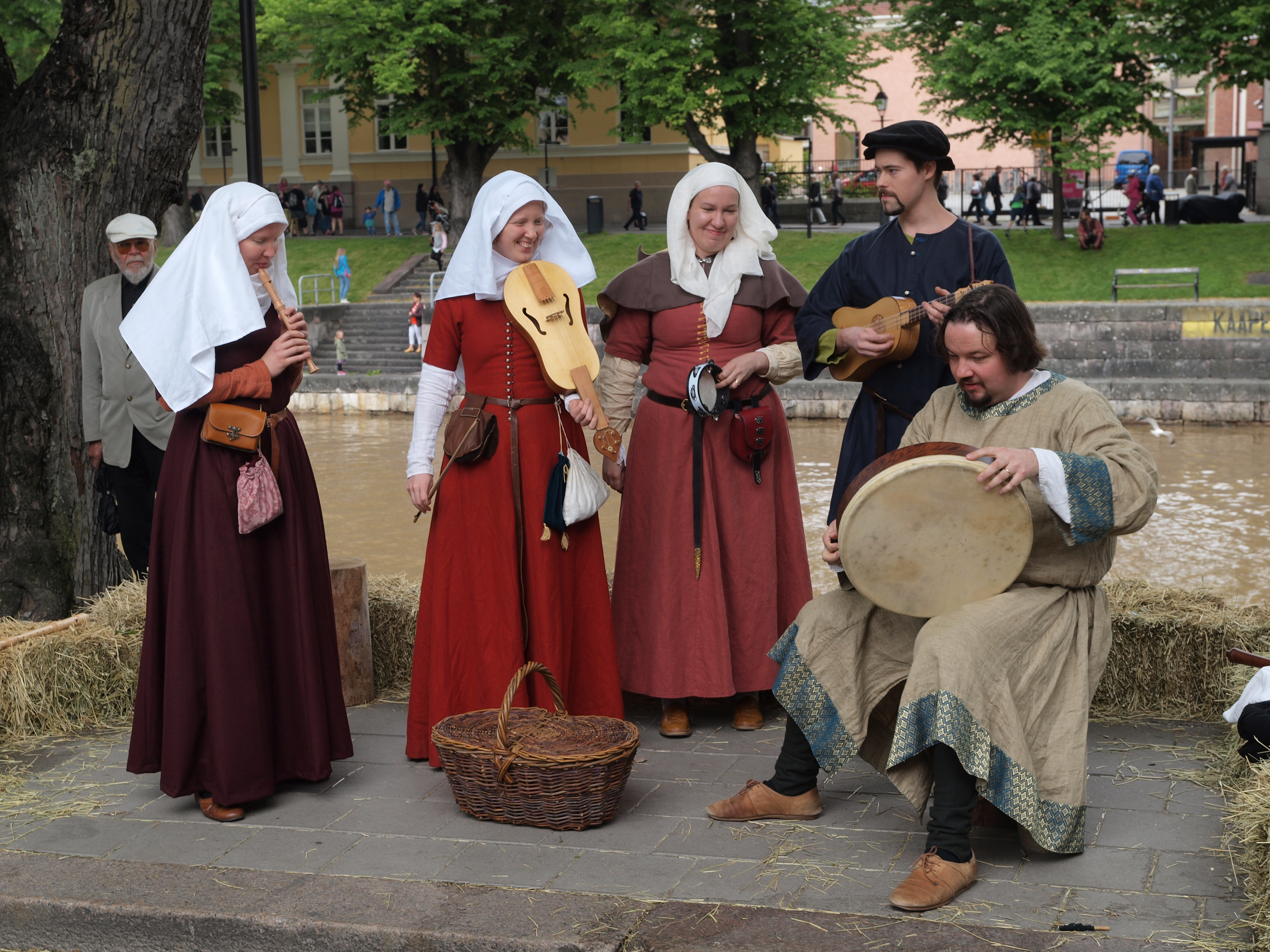
Medieval band 2015

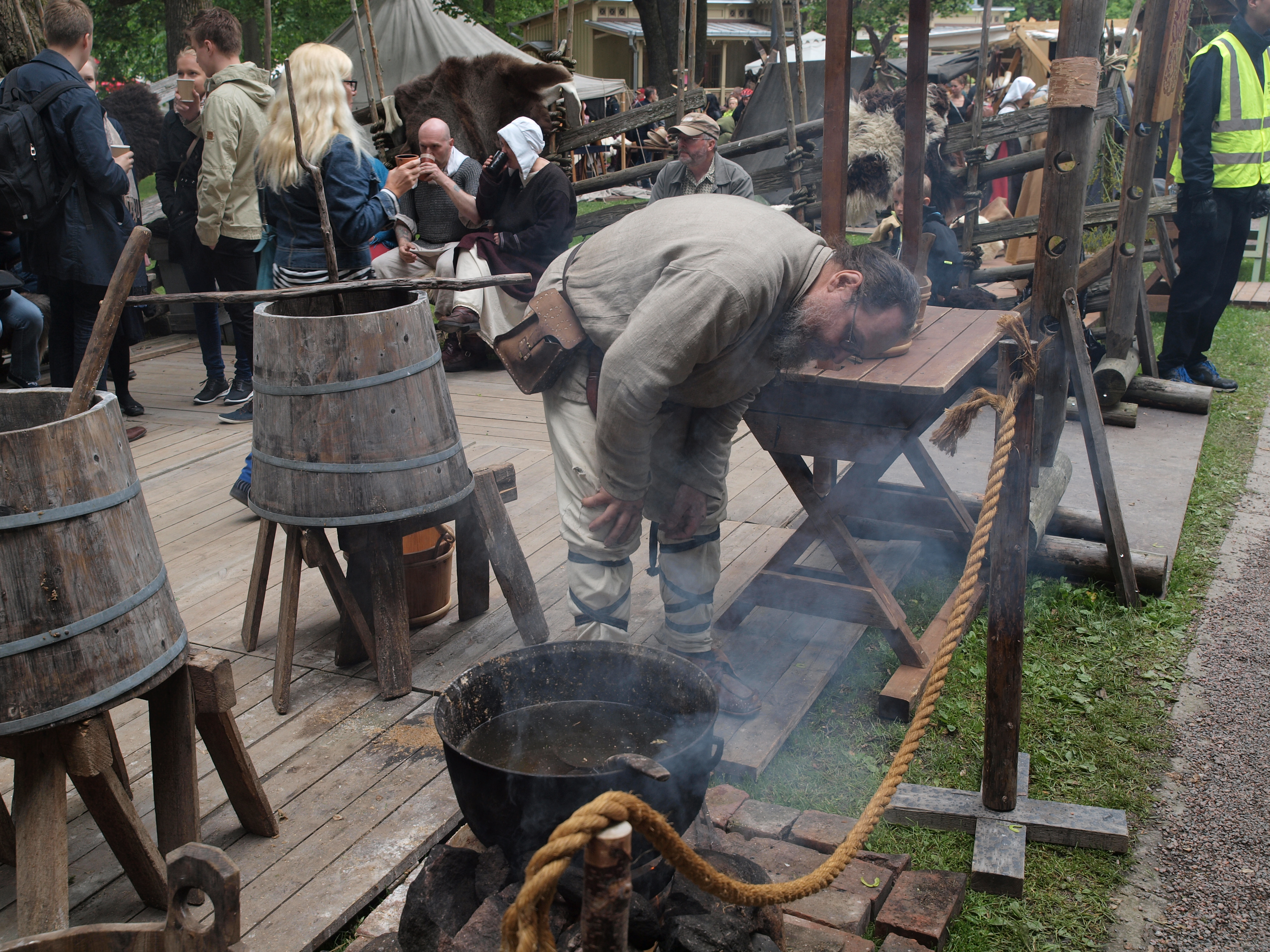
Sahti brewing 2015

== See also ==
- List of Renaissance fairs
