= Brinkhall Manor =

Coordinates: 60.369655°N 22.240689°E

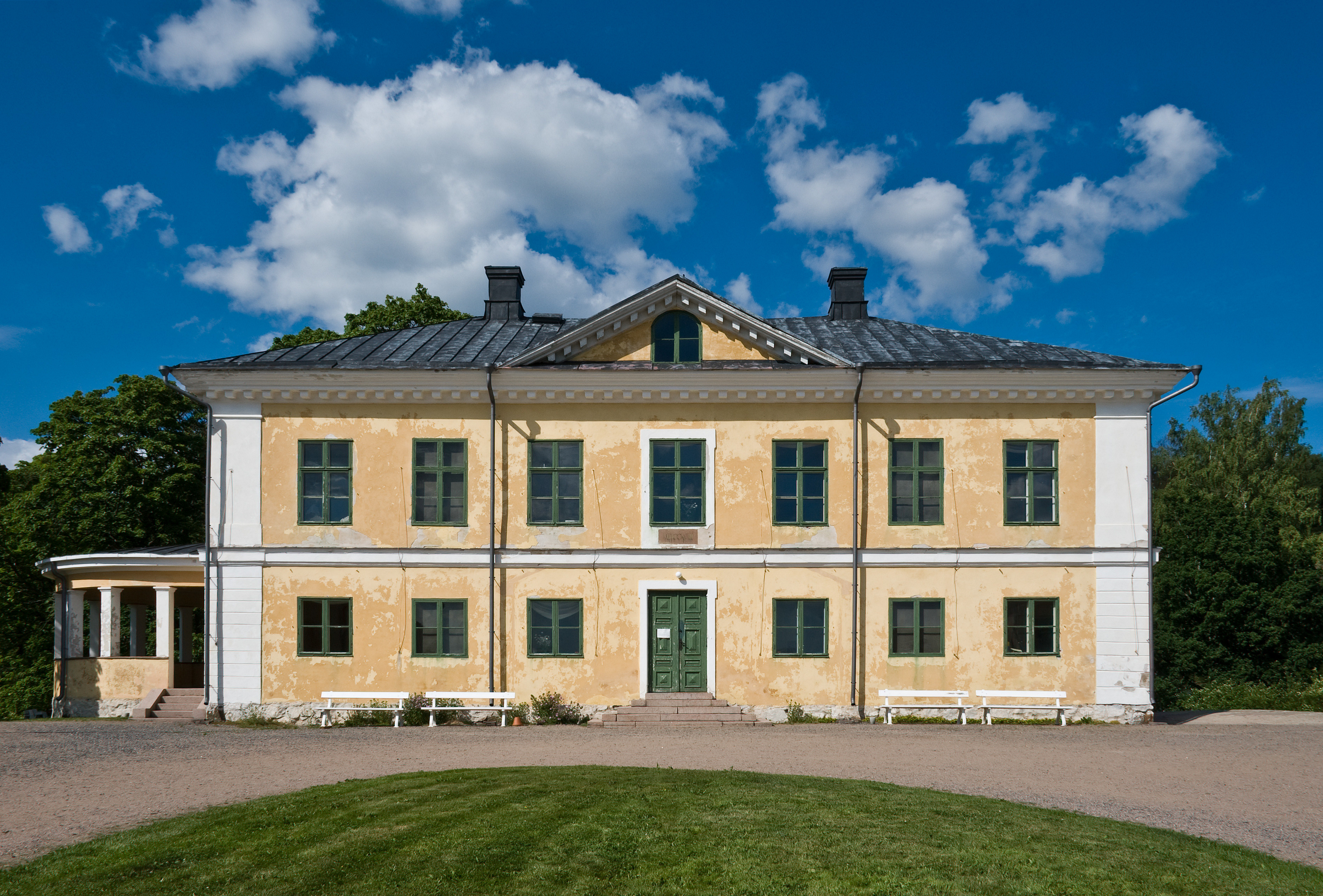
The entrance facade of Brinkhall Manor

Brinkhall Manor (Finnish: Brinkhallin kartano or Swedish: Brinkhalls gård) is a historic manor house on Kakskerta island in the municipality of Turku, Finland.

The mansion can trace its history back to the 16th century, when it was owned by Hans Erikson, the commander of Turku Castle, who also owned Brinkkala Mansion on the great square in Turku. He built a small castle, which was replaced by the existing manor in 1793. The house was designed by Gabriel von Bonndorff, an architect who was also the owner. It is the first neoclassical manor house in Finland. The interiors are from the 1920s. The last private owners sold the estate to the city of Turku in 1967, who turned it over to the Finnish Cultural Heritage Foundation in 2001.

Around the house there is an English landscape garden, one of the first in Finland, created at the start of the 19th century. The grounds were used as filming location for the historical TV drama Hovimäki.
