= Turku Main Library =

Chief branch of Turku City Library in Finland

- Turun kaupunginkirjaston pääkirjasto Åbo huvudbibliotek
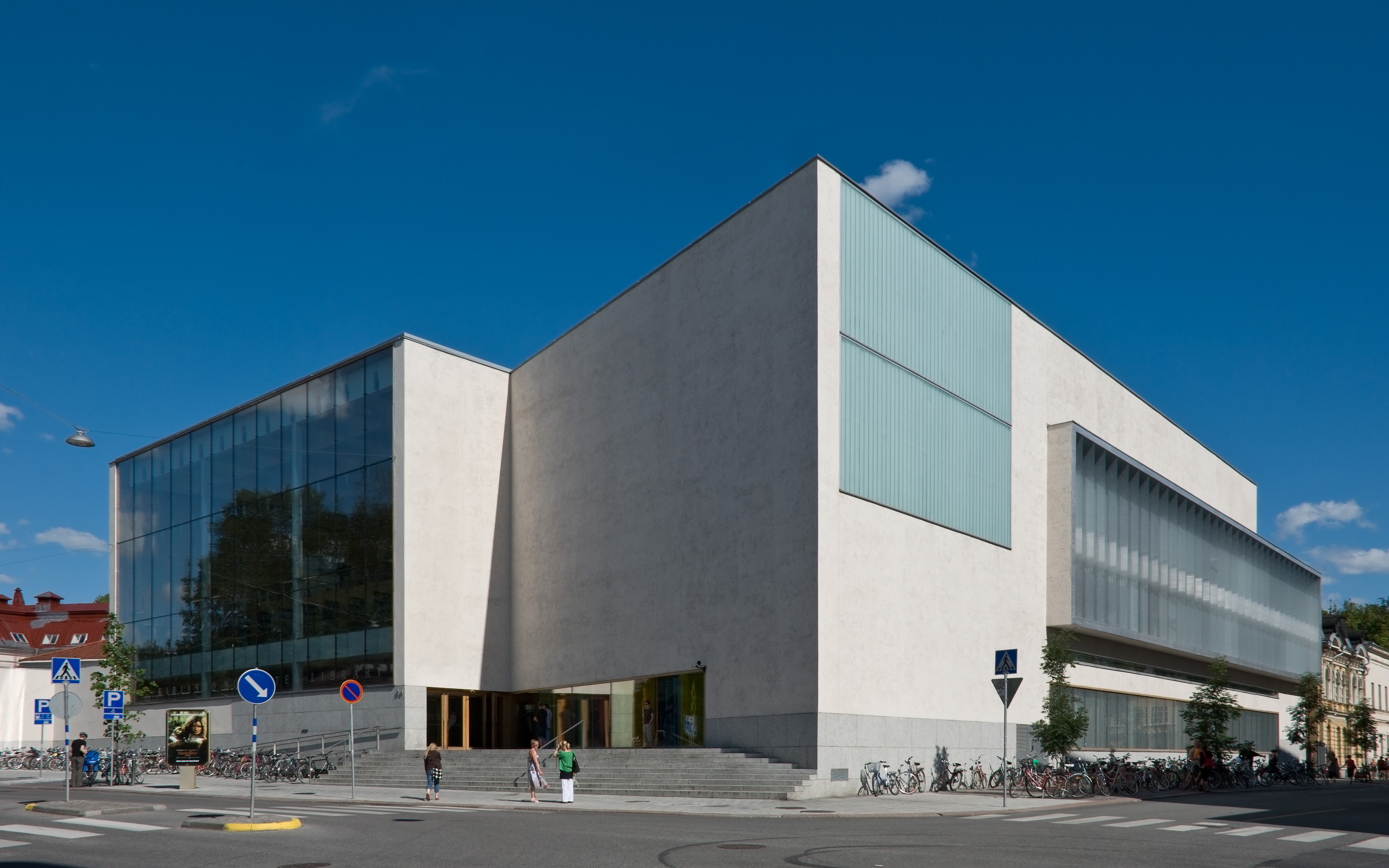
- Turku Main Library, new building
- Interactive map of the Turku Main Library area

General information
- Architectural style: Late Renaissance architecture (old building), Modern architecture (new building)
- Location: Turku, Finland, Linnankatu 2
- Coordinates: 60°27′01″N 22°16′16″E
- Completed: 1903 (old building), 2007 (new building)
- Renovated: 2008 (old building)

Design and construction
- Architects: Karl August Wrede (old building), Asmo Jaaksi (new building)
- Architecture firm: JKMM Architects (new building)
- Main contractor: Fredric von Rettig (old building)

Renovating team
- Renovating firm: Arkkitehtitoimisto C&Co Oy (old building)

Turku Main Library (Finnish: Turun kaupunginkirjaston pääkirjasto, Swedish: Åbo huvudbibliotek) is the chief branch of Turku City Library, located in the city centre of Turku, Finland. The library is approximately 8,500 m^{2}.

== Old building ==
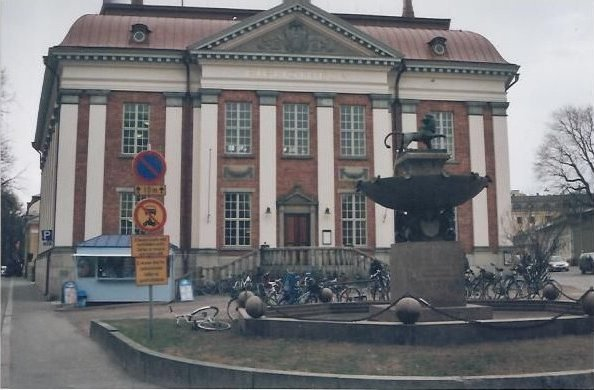
Turku Main Library, old building

The Turku Main Library 2,900 m^{2} old building is a Dutch late Renaissance style building, constructed in 1903, built and delivered by Turku commercial counsellor Fredric von Rettig and designed by Karl August Wrede. The design was based on a Swedish House of Nobility in Stockholm. The first floor was a national library for the working class and the second was the city library for academics. These two libraries merged in 1912 to become Turku City Library.

This library at the time was the third in Finland. Before there was a library in Turku, the only places to get books from a building was in Helsinki and Rauma.

== New building ==
Turku City Library expanded its operations and moved to a newly constructed building in 2007. The old building was renovated by architectural firm Arkkitehtitoimisto C&Co Oy, and the new section and overall plan by JKMM Architects. The head designer was architect Asmo Jaaksi. There is approximately 5,400 m^{2} of space in the new building.

Turku Main Library currently occupies three buildings: the old and new buildings and a former office building for the governor built in 1818 which is now Café Sirius. There is a walkway which connects the three buildings, going from old building past the café to the new building. The reference, magazine and the children's and young adults sections are located in the new building. After renovation was complete in 2008, the fiction, art and music sections can be found in the old building.

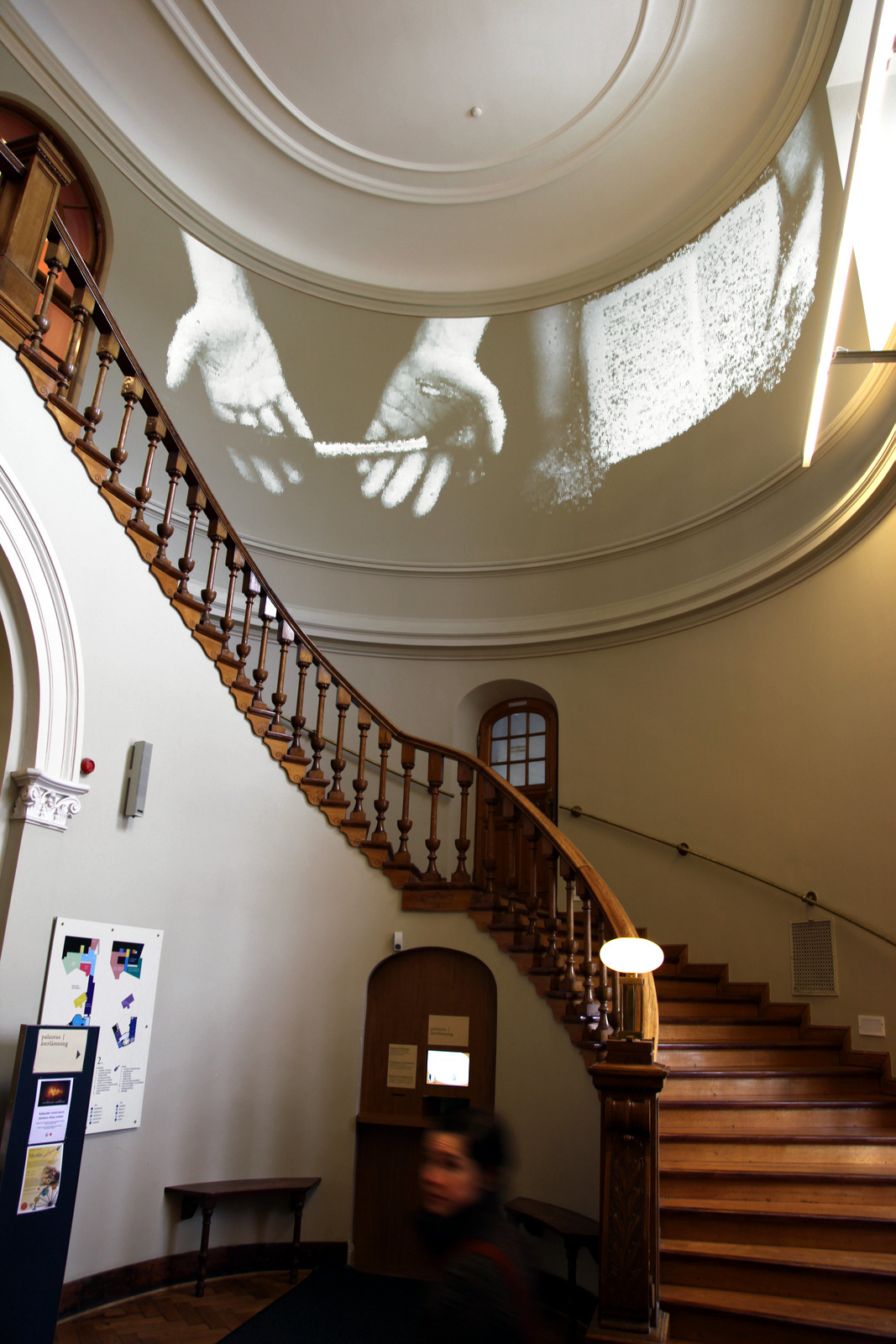
Linnankatu entrance to the old library building and art work 'Sub Rosa' by Charles Sandison.

The principle of percent for art was taken into consideration during the construction of the new building. This means that a part of the construction expenses were set aside for art projects at the library. Five works of art were acquired for the library: Saara Ekström's ornamental Alkukirjain (Initial Letter) spreads out on the walls of the main hall, and her video work Aakkoset (the Alphabet) can be seen at the Reading Corner of the hall. The sculpture Visual Vortex - Passage of Events by Hans-Christian Berg is situated in the showcase by the main entrance. Vestigia by Hilkka Könönen, inspired by abstract painting, is situated at the News Square. Hetkinen (Moment) by Ann Sundholm consists of gilded objects and a roof, and it shines its light on the main hall from the staff break room of the staff. Finally, Merja Pitkänen has realised sculpture installation Esiintymä (Occurrence) at the library cafe Sirius. An additional artwork 'Sub Rosa' by Charles Sandison was installed during restoration of the old library entrance in 2011. These pieces are a part of the Wäinö Aaltonen Museum of Art collection for the City of Turku.

== See also ==
- List of libraries in Finland
