= Aboa Vetus & Ars Nova =

Coordinates: 60°26′59″N 022°16′25″E

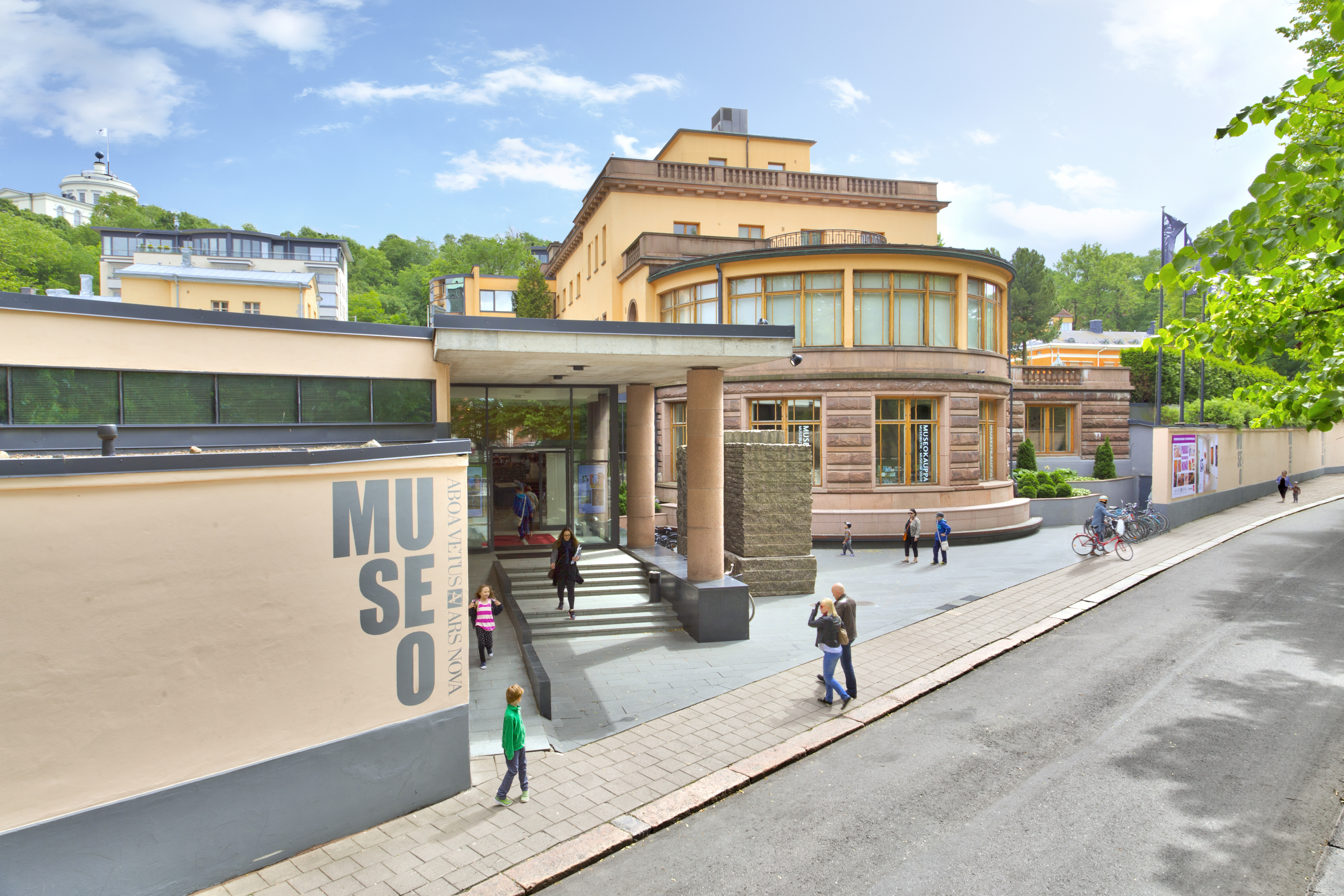
The main entrance to Aboa Vetus Ars Nova museum that operates in the historic Villa von Rettig.

Aboa Vetus Ars Nova is a museum in central Turku, Finland. The museum is housed in a building known as the Rettig palace, originally built in 1928. The archaeological section Aboa Vetus (Latin for Old Turku) displays portions of the city dating back to medieval times, while Ars Nova (Latin for New Art) is a museum of contemporary art.

The museum was first opened in 1995 as two independent museums. Originally, plans were for only Ars Nova, the contemporary art museum, but during its construction a number of structures and artifacts dating back to the Middle Ages were discovered, and the archaeological excavation that was commissioned eventually transformed into Aboa Vetus. The two museums were combined in 2004 and Aboa Vetus & Ars Nova is now among the most popular tourist venues in the entire region of Southwest Finland.

As the only archaeological museum in Finland, the museum is known for its archaeological activities. After the initial excavations in the 1990s, the museum has continued archaeological research since 2005. Public engagement and community archaeology have a pivotal role in the museum, and the research is done by both archaeologists and engaged volunteers.
