= Islands of Turku =

Islands belonging to the Finnish city of Turku

The Islands of Turku consist of islands belonging to the Finnish city of Turku. The greater Turku archipelago consists of more than 20,000 islands. There are dozens of islands and skerries, of which four have significant amounts of permanent inhabitants:

- Ruissalo/Runsala, accessible by bus from the city centre
- Hirvensalo
- Kakskerta
- Satava

== See also ==
- Archipelago Sea
