= Sirkkalankatu =

Street in Turku, Finland

- Sirkkalagatan (Swedish)
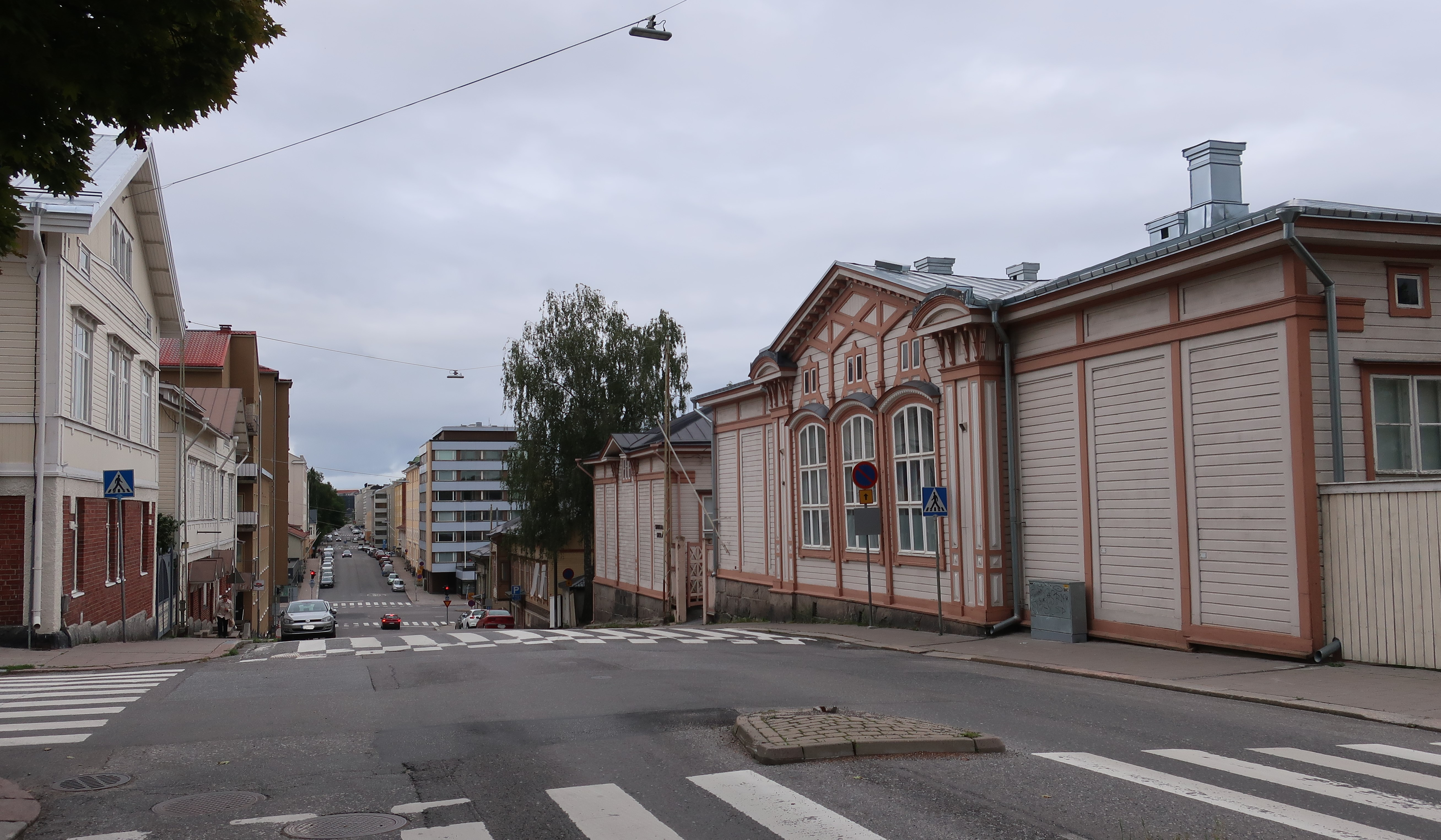
- View towards east at the intersection of Sirkkalankatu and Kotikatu
- Interactive map of Sirkkalankatu
- Former names: Arseninkatu, Arsenin poikkikatu
- Length: 1.5 km (0.93 mi)
- Location: Turku, Finland

Sirkkalankatu (Swedish: Sirkkalagatan; lit. Sirkkala Street) is a street in Turku. It runs for approximately 1.5 km in the city's I, II and III District beginning at Joukahaisenkatu and ending at Kivenhakkaajankatu near the Turku Sports Park.

Sirkkalankatu got its current name during the 1920s. Before that the street was known as Arseninkatu.

The street is located in a hilly area, and public transport bus routes only run between Kerttulinkatu and Joukahaisenkatu. Buildings along the street include the former Sirkkala barracks, Luostarinmäki Handicrafts Museum, the Turunmaa Hospital and the former maternity hospital Heideken.

== Location and route ==
Located in the City Centre of Turku, Sirkkalankatu is approximately 1.5 kilometers long. Sirkkalankatu begins at Joukahaisenkatu by the old Kupittaa railway station. It runs westwards through the city's I, II and III District ending at Kivenhakkaajankatu by the Turku Sports Park. The street first climbs up the Vartiovuorenmäki hill descending then towards Kaskenkatu. Towards the end, the street begins to slightly climb up again when it nears the Sports Park hill.

Sirkkalankatu intersects with the following streets form east to west: Joukahaisenkatu, Lemminkäisenkatu, Kaivokatu, Kerttulinkatu, Kellonsoittajankatu, Uudenmaankatu, Kotikatu, Tähtitorninkatu, Vartiovuorenkatu, Kaskenkatu, Vuorikatu, Sepänkatu, Neitsytpolku and Kivenhakkaajankatu.

== History ==
The street now known as Sirkkalankatu was called Arsenin poikkikatu (Swedish: Arsenii Tvär Gatan; lit. Arseny Cross Street) from 1830 onwards. The name of the street was a reference to another street, Arseninkatu (current Uudenmaankatu), which ran from a bridge of the Aura River to Uudenmaan tulli (lit. Uusimaa customs). Both streets were named after the Russian Arseny Zakrevsky, who served as the Governor-General of Finland from 1824 to 1831. As the governor general, Zakrevsky led the reparations of the city after the Great Fire of Turku in 1827. The name of Arsenin poikkikatu was changed to Arseninkatu (Swedish: Arseniigatan) in 1890, when the original Arseninkatu was renamed as Uudenmaankatu.

The Russian based street names of Turku were replaced during the 1920s, and also Arseninkatu was renamed as Sirkkalankatu (Swedish: Sirkkalagatan; lit. Sirkkala Street) in 1924. The new name was based on a fact that there had long existed a hill called Sirkkalanmäki on the route of Arseninkatu. Historical records also mention an 18th-century merchant called Henrik Sirkkala, whose house may have been the namesake of the hill. In 1905, there still existed a well called the Sirkkala spring on the grounds of the Turunmaa Hospital.
