= District 1 =

District 1 may refer to:

== Places ==
- I District, Turku, in Finland
- District 1, Düsseldorf, a district in Düsseldorf, Germany
- Sector 1 (Bucharest), also known as District 1, in Bucharest, Romania
- District I, Budapest in Budapest, Hungary
- District 1, Grand Bassa County, in Liberia
- District 1, an electoral district of Malta
- District 1, a police district of Malta
- Altstadt (Zürich), also known as District 1, in Zürich, Switzerland
- District 1 (New York City Council), in New York City, United States
- Michigan's 1st Senate district, United States
- Michigan's 1st House of Representatives district, United States
- Michigan's 1st congressional district, United States
- District 1, Ho Chi Minh City, in Vietnam
- 1st Senate district (disambiguation) (various)

== Fiction ==
- District 1 (The Hunger Games), a district in The Hunger Games book and film series

== See also ==
- 1st District
