= Geographic contiguity =

Land divisions not interrupted by other land or water

Åland, the autonomous region of Finland, and the Turku archipelago belonging to the rest of Finland in the Archipelago Sea.

Geographic contiguity is the characteristic in geography of political or geographical land divisions, as a group, not being interrupted by other land or water. Such divisions are referred to as being contiguous. In the United States, for example, the "48 contiguous states" excludes Hawaii and Alaska, which do not share borders with other U.S. states. Other examples of geographical contiguity might include the "contiguous European Union" excluding member states such as Ireland, Sweden, Finland (between Åland and Turku Archipelago), Malta and Cyprus (these being non-contiguous), or the "contiguous United Kingdom" referring to all parts of the country excepting Northern Ireland (it being geographically non-contiguous). Two or more contiguous municipalities can be consolidated into one, or one municipality can consist of many non-contiguous elements. For example, the Financially Distressed Municipalities Act allows the commonwealth of Pennsylvania to merge contiguous municipalities to reduce financial distress.

Geographic contiguity is important in biology, especially animal ranges. For a particular species, its habitat may be a 'contiguous range', or it might be broken, requiring periodic, typically seasonal migrations (see: Disjunct distribution). The same concept of contiguous range is true for human transportation studies in an attempt to understand census geography. It also comes into play with electoral geography and politics. In United States real property and mineral rights law, touching of two tracts at a common corner (as checkerboarded land) is generally considered contiguous.

== Non-contiguity ==
Regions that are administered as one, but do not form a single integral landmass on the map, are referred to as non-contiguous regions. Examples include Angola, divided into the mainland and the Cabinda exclave to the north, and various non-contiguous transcontinental countries. The designation is not normally used for island nations.

The concept of geographic contiguity has recently been applied to describe the Anglosphere as a non-contiguous region united by shared linguistic, cultural, and historical ties. This perspective introduces a novel regional approach, emphasizing interconnectedness across geographically dispersed nations.
