= Lauttaranta =

District of Turku, Finland

Coordinates: 60°25′35″N 22°13′30″E

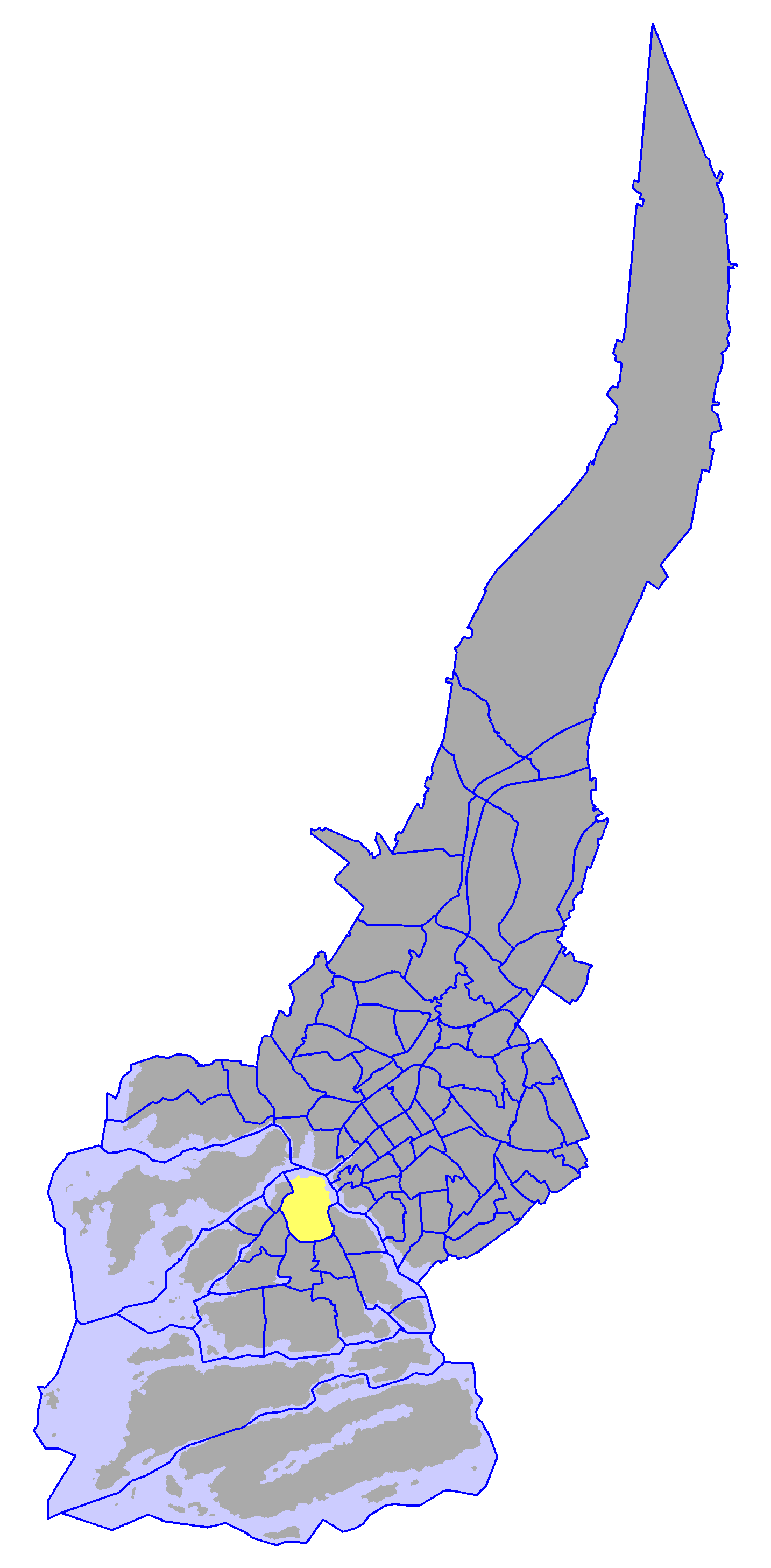
Lauttaranta on a map of Turku.

Lauttaranta (Finnish; Färjstranden in Swedish) is a district and a suburb of the city of Turku, in Finland. It is located in the northern part of the island of Hirvensalo, off the city's coastline. The only bridge between Hirvensalo and the mainland is located in Lauttaranta, connecting it to the district of Pihlajaniemi.

The current (as of 2004) population of Lauttaranta is 236, and it is increasing at an annual rate of 3.39%. 15.25% of the district's population are under 15 years old, while 12.71% are over 65. The district's linguistic makeup is 92.37% Finnish and 7.63% Swedish.

== See also ==
- Districts of Turku
- Districts of Turku by population
