= Väiski =

The Finnish word Väiski may refer to:

- Headgear worn by Finnish Scouts
- FFR/Väiski, a Finnish football club in the SPL Helsingin piiri
