= The Guides and Scouts of Finland =

National Scouting organization in Finland

Suomen Partiolaiset - Finlands Scouter ry
- The Guides and Scouts of Finland
- Headquarters: Helsinki
- Country: Finland
- Founded: 1972
- Membership: 75,000
- Affiliation: World Association of Girl Guides and Girl Scouts, World Organization of the Scout Movement
- Website partio.fi (English)

Cub Scout (sudenpentu)	Scout/Rover	Scout/Rover

Suomen Partiolaiset - Finlands Scouter ry (The Guides and Scouts of Finland, GSF) is the national Scouting and Guiding association of Finland. Scouting was founded in Finland in 1910 as part of the Russian Empire, registered with the central organization of the tsarist Russian Scout movement Русский Скаут. Finnish Scouting was among the charter members of the World Organization of the Scout Movement in 1922. Guiding started in 1910 and was among the founding members of the World Association of Girl Guides and Girl Scouts. In 1972 the Girl Guide Association and the Boy Scout Association merged and formed Suomen Partiolaiset. The association has about 75,000 members.

In Finland, the Scouting movement was viewed early on as an alternative to the Pioneers communist youth organization, which was active for some time in the Nordic nation.

== History ==
The Finnish Scouts and Guides were founded in 1972 when the two separate central Scouting organizations, the Finnish Boy Scouts Association (Suomen Partiopoikajärjestö - Finlands Scoutunion ry, SPJ) and the Finnish Girl Scouts Association (Suomen Partiotyttöjärjestö - Finlands Flickscoutunion ry, SPTJ), merged into a single organization.

Scouting arrived in Finland in 1910. Scouting was banned in Finland during Russian rule between 1911 and 1917, when Governor-General of Finland Franz Albert Seyn issued an order prohibiting the activity, citing its militaristic nature. During this time, some scout troops operated secretly.

In 1917, after Finnish independence, the Finnish Scouting Association (Finlands Scoutförbund) was founded, but disbanded in 1919. Soon after, eight different Scouting associations were established in Finland. Girls and boys operated separately. In the 1920s, Finnish Scouting was organized by the Finnish Boy Scouts Central Committee (Suomen Partiopoikien Keskusvaliokunnan).

The Finnish Boy Scout Association was founded in 1941.

The Finnish Girl Scout Association was founded in 1943, when multiple previously independent Girl Scout associations merged.

The Finnish Scouts and Guides were founded on April 23, 1972, in the ballroom of the Helsinki School of Economics.

== Programme ==
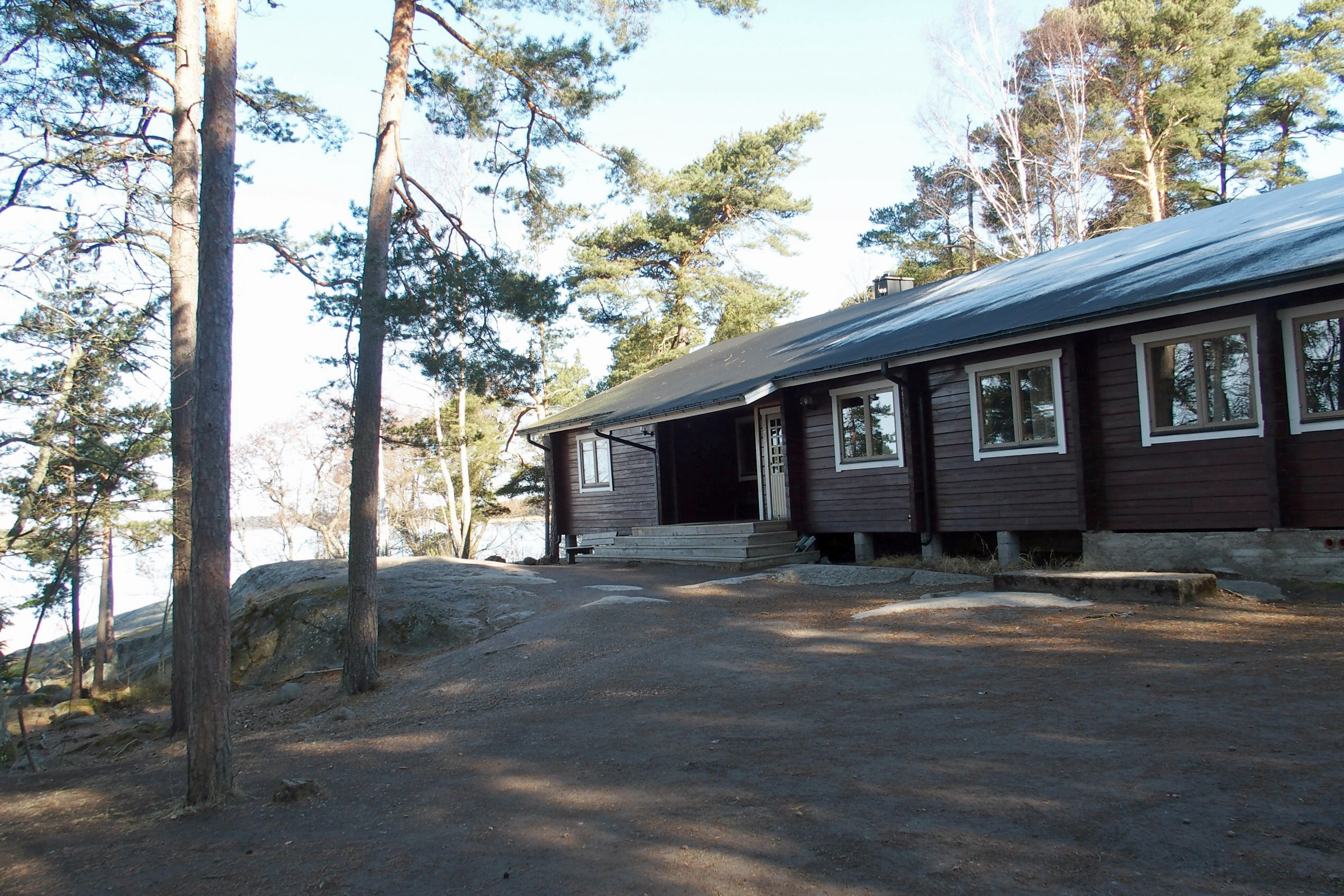
Scout camp center in Oriniemi, Hirvensalo, Turku

The Finnish Scout organization is a nonpolitical, nonsectarian and multilingual organization, as evidenced by the name of the organization itself, using both the Finnish and Swedish languages. Its religious neutrality is reflected in the Finnish Scout promise, which begins "I promise to love my God..."

Scouting is one of the most popular hobbies in Finland. To live with nature, act according to its conditions and protecting and honoring it, is one of the cornerstones of Finnish Scouting. Another important objective is to learn social abilities. Finnish Scouts and Guides learn how to become knowledgeable and active citizens, at ease with other countries and cultures. Finnish Scouting culture itself includes wearing a unique skullcap hat called a väiski as part of the uniform.

Finland contains thousands of lakes and an abundance of forests. Hiking and camping are a vital part of Scouting. Outdoor activities, winter camps and skiing tours test the knowledge and skills of the Scouts.

All groups plan and execute their own programs and emphasize special interests. Community involvement and service to help members become active, responsible members of society are stressed in the program.

Sea Scouts carry out many kinds of activities related to sailing and undergo an extensive training program in seamanship, with an emphasis on safety. They have large on-the-water gatherings every year and a Sea Scout camp every four years.

The Finnish Scouts have close international ties with Scouts in other countries, particularly Scandinavian countries. They have also expanded its international connections to Russia through youth exchanges between the two countries. Scouts in Finland are actively involved in development projects in Africa and have raised funds for the immunization program for Nepal.

=== Scout Promise ===
"I promise to do my best to live for the good of my country and the world,
to develop in my spiritual beliefs and worldview
and fulfil the ideals of the <age group> every day."

== Oldest unit ==
Toimen Pojat (Unga Fribyggare in Swedish), a Scouting troop in Kauniainen, Finland was established in 1910. Toimen Pojat is the oldest continuously operating Scout troop in Finland. During the Russian ban on Scouting in the 1910s before the Finnish independence in 1917, the troop operated underground. Many traditions that distinguish the troop formed during that period.

== Structures ==
The Guides and Scouts of Finland offers programs to members between 7 and 25 years of age.

The Guides and Scouts are divided into five age groups:

- Cub Scouts (sudenpennut, vargungar) - 7-10 years
- Adventurers (seikkailijat, äventrysscouter) - 10-12 years
- Trackers (tarpojat, spejarscouter) - 12-15 years
- Explorers (samoajat, explorerscouter) - 15-18 years
- Rovers (vaeltajat, roverscouter) - 18-22 years

Suomen Partiolaiset is divided in 10 Scout districts, which resemble the former Finnish provinces. The only exception is Finlands Svenska Scouter r.f. serving the Swedish minority in Finland and the Åland Islands. 11% of the 7- to 10-year-olds and 13% of 10- to 14-year-old Finns are members of the organization. Girl Scouts represent 56% of the total. There are about 900 Scout troops.

== Jamborees ==
Suomen Partiolaiset has organised a number of Jamborees, known as "FinnJamboree"s:

Name	Location	Year	Participants
Karelia	Koli	1979	c. 9,000
Miilu (Charcoal pile)	Jämijärvi	1985	c. 10,000
Tervas (Core)	Kannonkoski	1990	c. 13,500
Loisto (Beacon)	Hanko	1996	c. 14,500
Tarus	Padasjoki	2004	c. 13,000
Kilke (Jingle)	Hämeenlinna	2010	c. 10,500
Roihu (Blaze)	Hämeenlinna	2016	c. 17,000
Kajo (Gleam)	Hämeenlinna	2022	c. 13,000
Lumo (Charm)	2029	10,000+	

== See also ==
- Jarl Wahlström
