= Mäntymäki =

District of Turku, Finland

Coordinates: 60°26′20″N 22°16′0″E

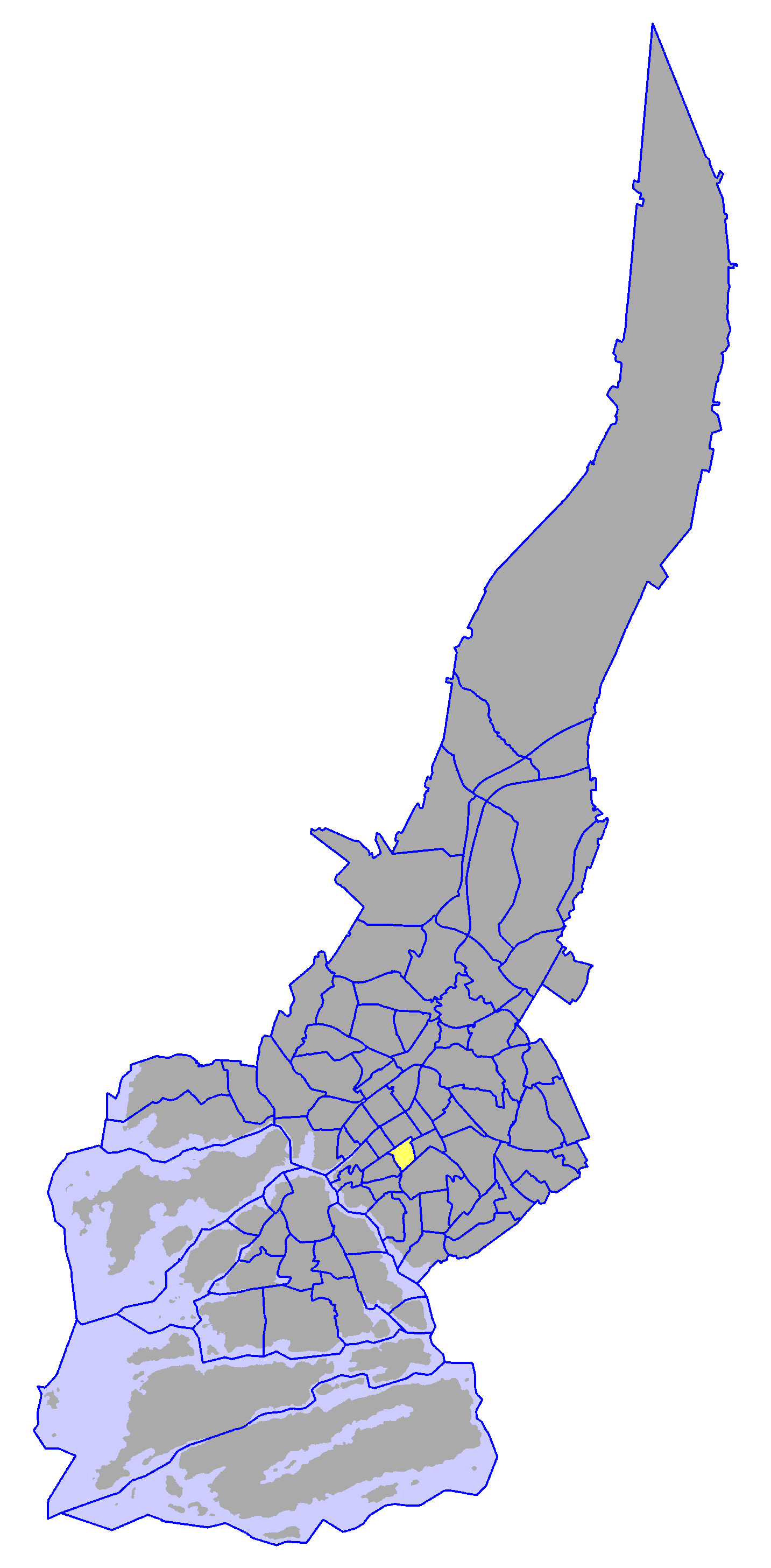
Mäntymäki on a map of Turku.

Mäntymäki (Swedish: Tallbacka) is a district of the city of Turku, in Finland. It is located to the south of the city centre, between Kurjenmäki and Vähäheikkilä.

The current (as of 2004) population of Mäntymäki is 1,489, and it is decreasing at an annual rate of 0.34%. 10.28% of the district's population are under 15 years old, while 21.76% are over 65. The district's linguistic makeup is 90.33% Finnish, 6.85% Swedish, and 2.82% other.

== See also ==
- Districts of Turku
- Districts of Turku by population
