= Kakskerta =

- Former municipality
- Kakskerran kunta Kakskerta kommun
- Coat of arms

- Location of Kakskerta in Finland
- Interactive map of Kakskerta
- Coordinates: 60°22′N 22°13′E
- Country: Finland
- Province: Turku and Pori Province
- Region: Finland Proper
- Established: 1858
- Merged into Turku: 1968
- Seat: Kakskerta

Area
  - Land: 31.2 km^{2} (12.0 sq mi)

Population (1967-12-31)
  - Total: 762

Kakskerta is an island in the Archipelago Sea, south of the city of Turku, Finland. It is a former municipality and a current district of Turku. Like other islands in the Archipelago Sea, it has many summer residences. Lake Kakskerta is located in the middle of the island.

The current (as of 2005) population of Kakskerta is 633, and it is increasing at an annual rate of 4.11%. 19.43% of the district's population are under 15 years old, while 11.85% are over 65. The district's linguistic makeup is 94.94% Finnish, 4.27% Swedish, and 0.79% other.

There is a stone church on Kakskerta, constructed in the 17th and 18th centuries. The municipality was annexed into the city of Turku in 1968. The Brinkhall manor was the filming location for the historical TV drama Hovimäki.

== Name ==
The name of Kakskerta roughly translated means "double" (kaksinkertainen), referring to the island's shape, as it appears to loop around the long lake Kakskerranjärvi in the middle of the island.

In Swedish, the island has also been known as Kaxbyrita ö.

== History ==
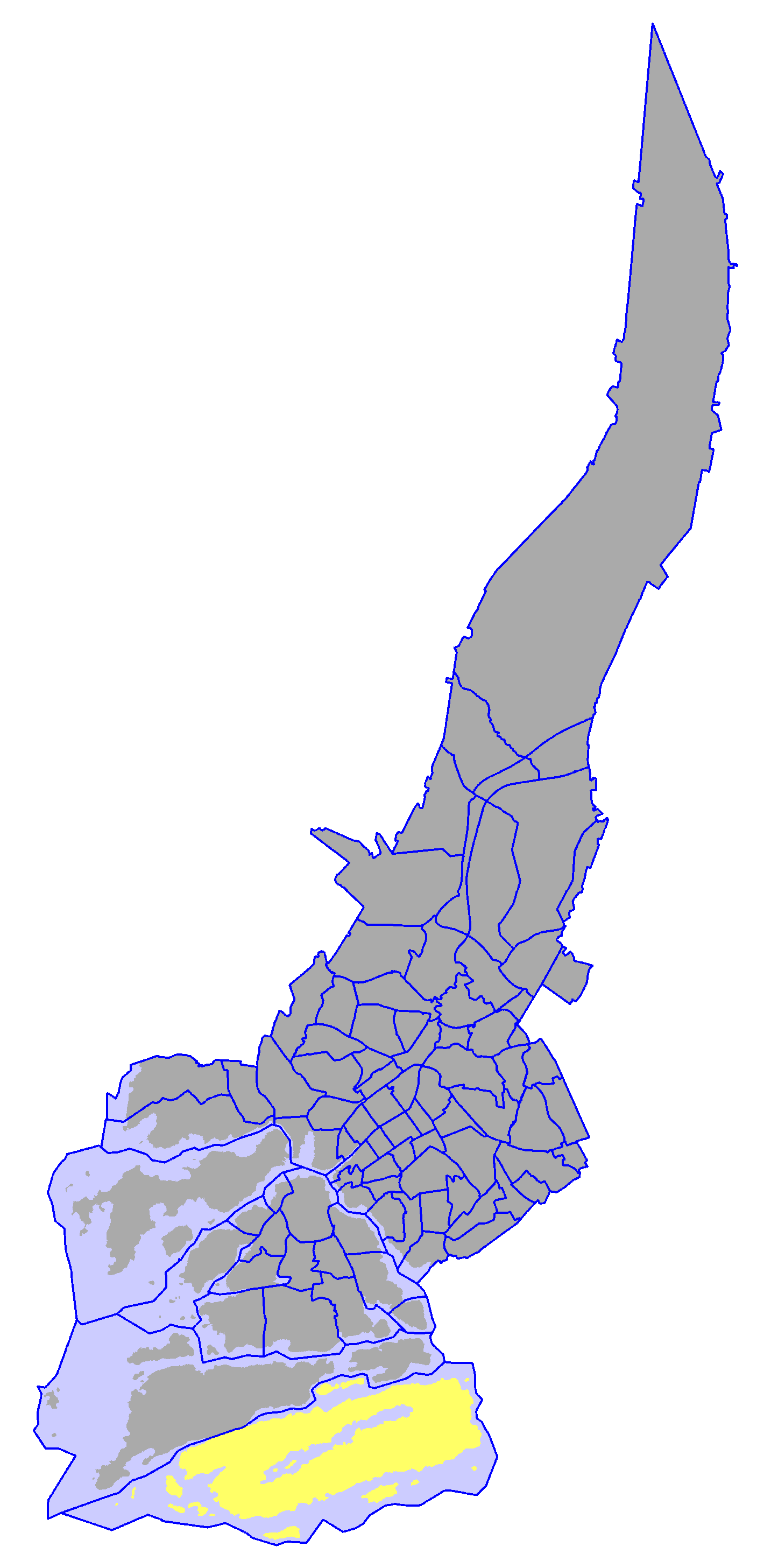
Kakskerta on a map of Turku

Kakskerta was first mentioned in 1430 when it was a part of the Kaarina parish. The inhabitants of Kakskerta, Satava and Kulho were permitted to construct a chapel in 1693, but one was not built. Later, the Kakskerta church was built in 1764-1770. Kakskerta eventually became a separate municipality in 1858 and a parish in 1904.

In 1909, the inhabitants of Hirvensalo, then part of Maaria, pleaded the Finnish government to transfer the island to the Kakskerta municipality, which was opposed by the municipal government of Maaria. While Hirvensalo was transferred to the Kakskerta parish in 1939, it never joined the municipality. In 1944, Hirvensalo was transferred to Turku instead.

The Kakskerta parish was disestablished in 1959 and its territories were now ecclesiastically parts of the Martin's Church parish of Turku. The municipality remained independent until 1968.

== Gallery ==
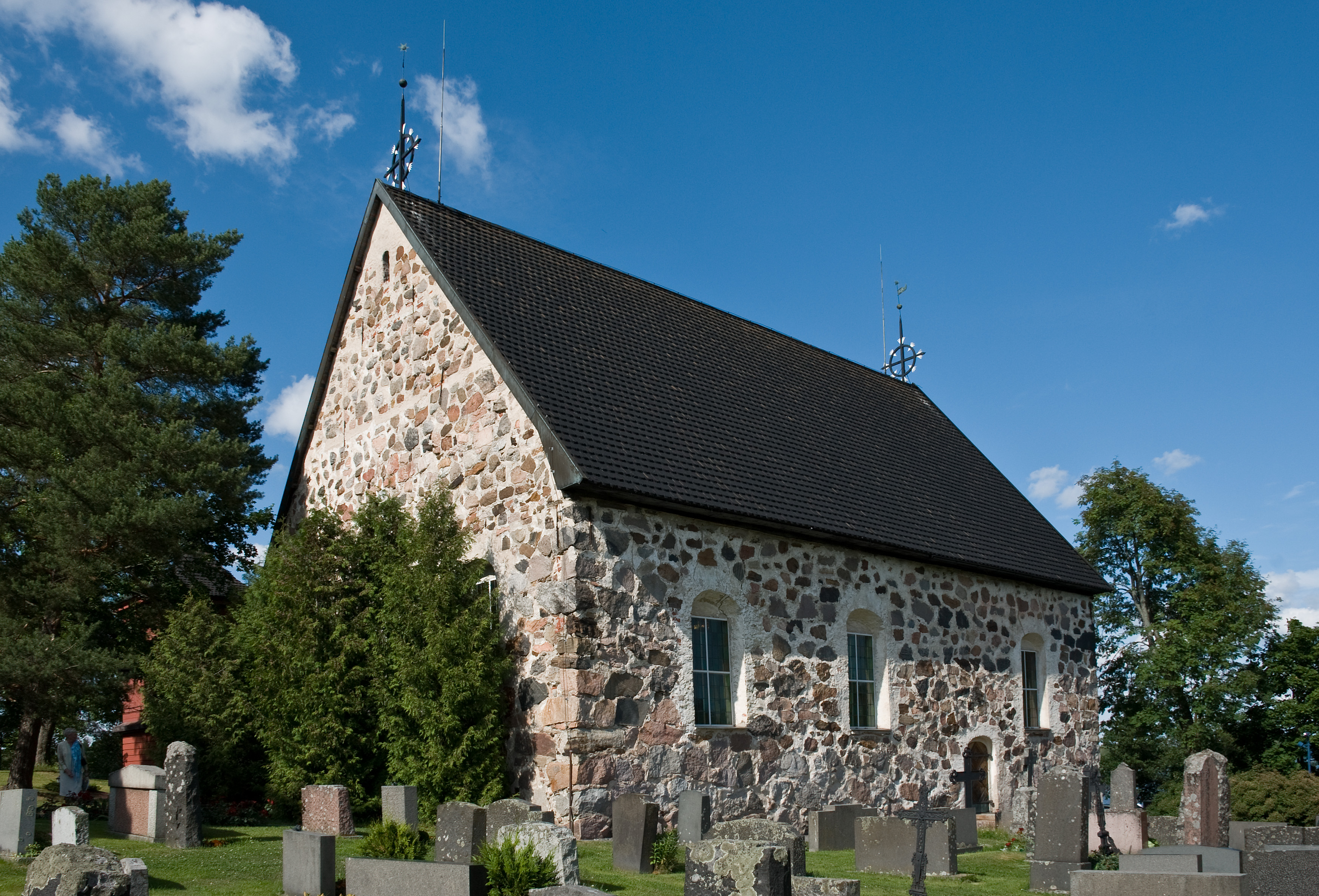
Kakskerta Church

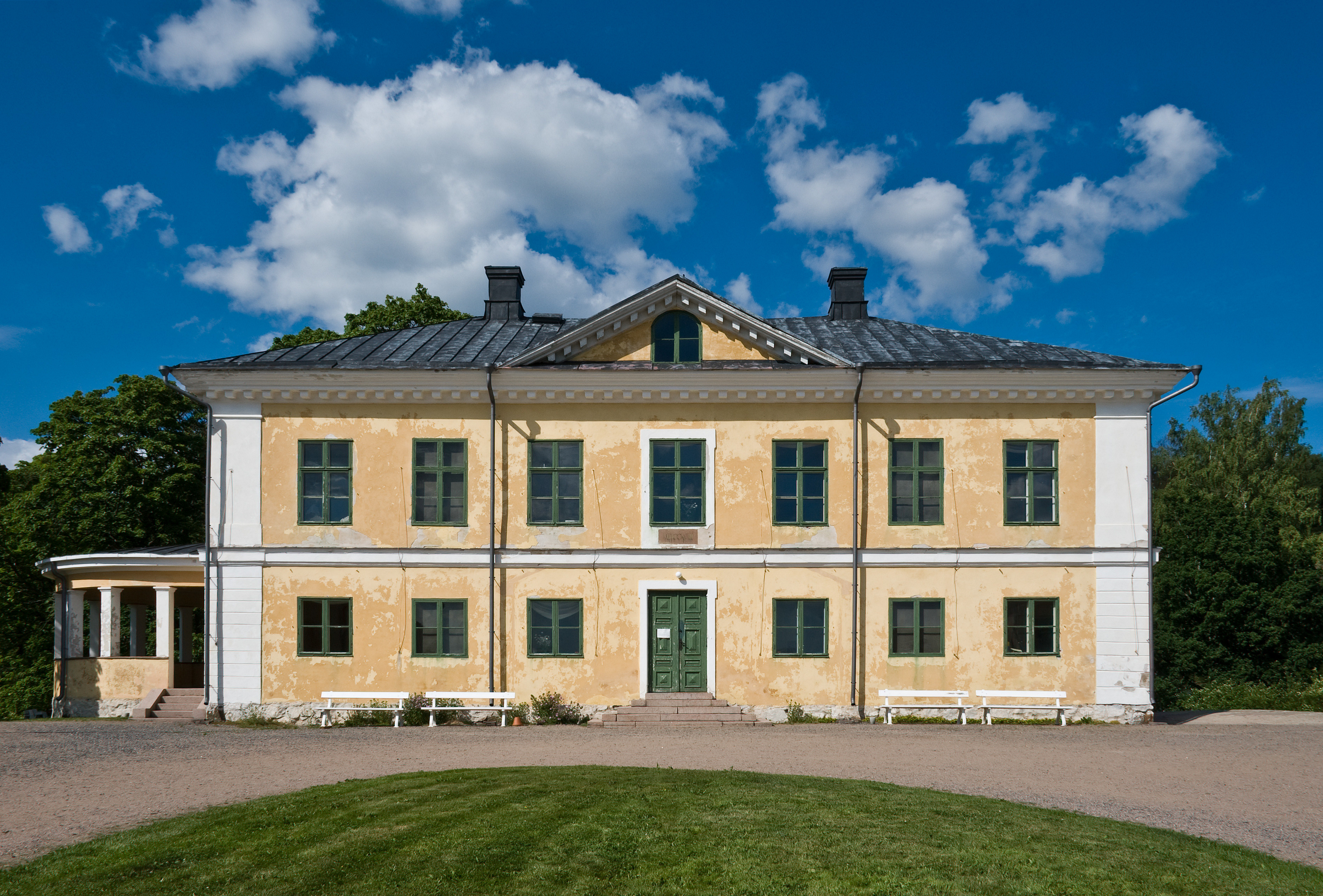
Brinkhall Manor

== See also ==
- Districts of Turku
- Districts of Turku by population
