= Kurjenmäki =

District of Turku, Finland

Coordinates: 60°26′26″N 22°16′50″E

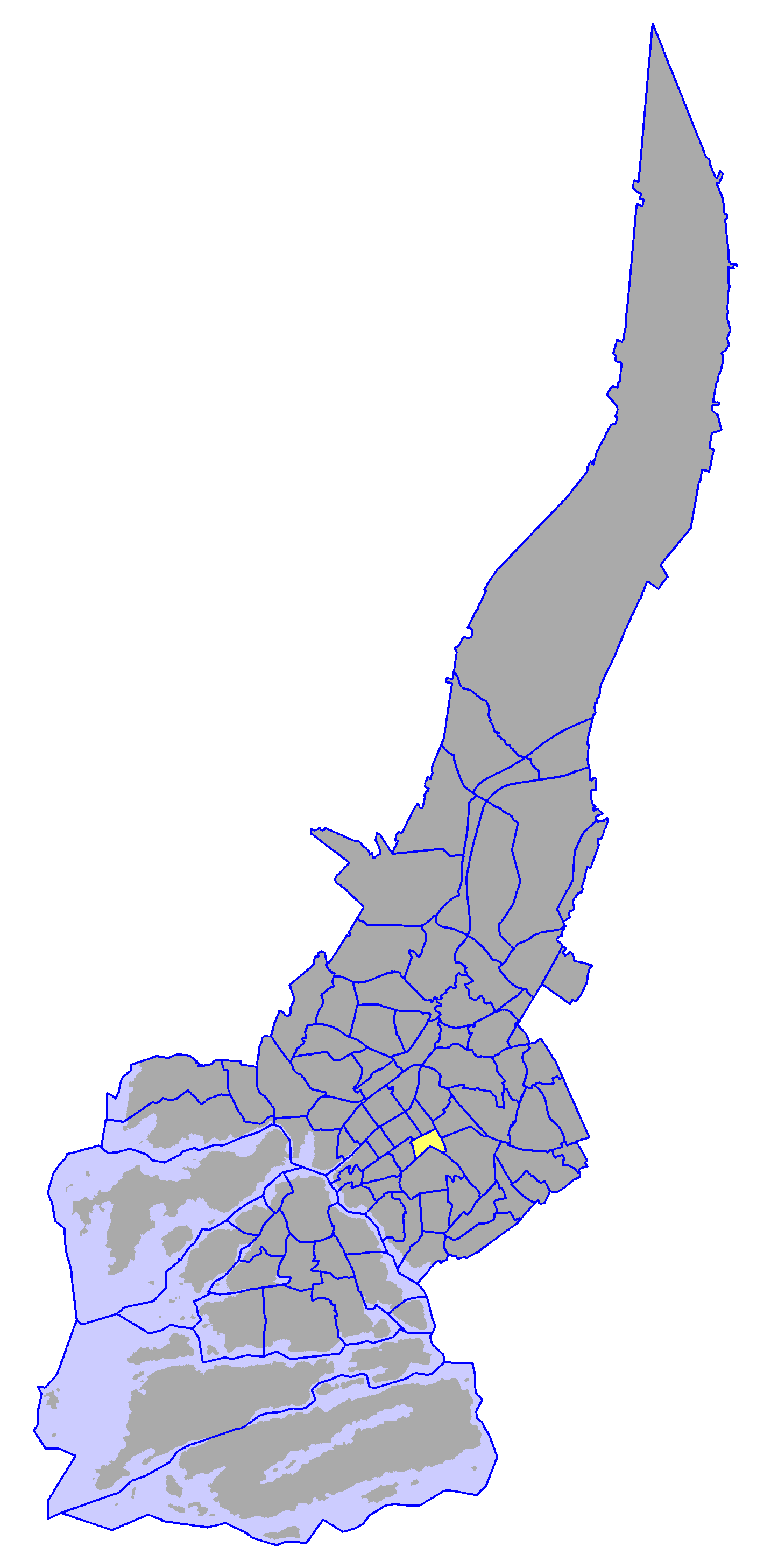
Kurjenmäki on a map of Turku.

Kurjenmäki (Finnish; Tranbacken in Swedish) is a district of the city of Turku, in Finland. It is located to the southeast of the city centre, bordering on the city centre's II and III districts, as well as Kupittaa. The Turku City Hospital is located in Kurjenmäki.

The current (as of 2004) population of Kurjenmäki is 679, and it is decreasing at an annual rate of 2.50%. 7.07% of the district's population are under 15 years old, while 20.47% are over 65. The district's linguistic makeup is 92.64% Finnish, 3.39% Swedish, and 3.98% other.

== See also ==
- Districts of Turku
- Districts of Turku by population
