= Pikisaari =

City district in Turku, Finland

Coordinates: 60°25′40″N 22°12′5″E

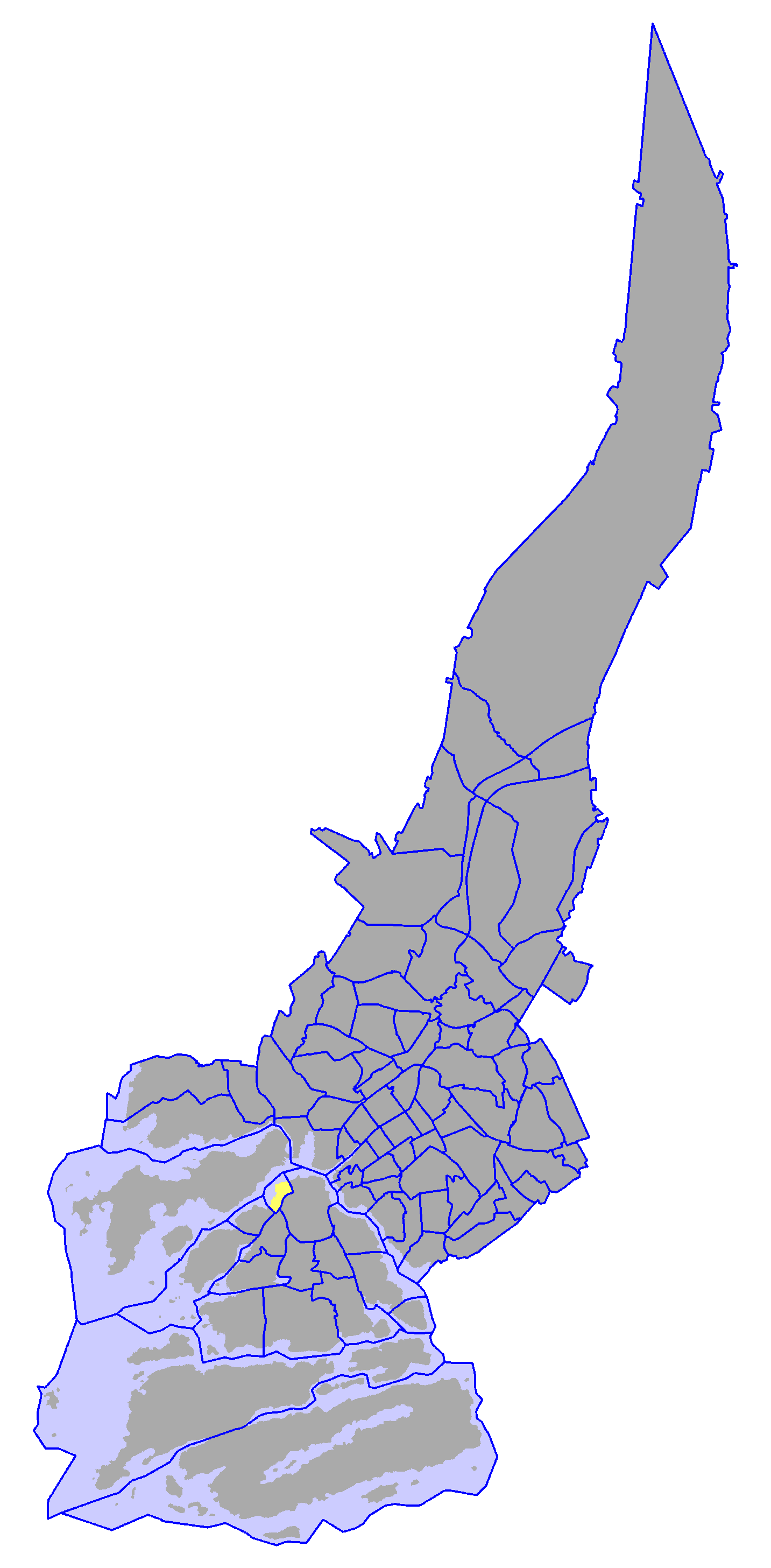
Pikisaari on a map of Turku.

Pikisaari (Finnish; Beckholmen in Swedish) is a district of the city of Turku, in Finland. It is located in the northern part of the island of Hirvensalo, off the city's coastline.

The current (as of 2004) population of Pikisaari is 226, and it is decreasing at an annual rate of 9.29%. 18.14% of the district's population are under 15 years old, while 14.60% are over 65. The district's linguistic makeup is 87.17% Finnish, 10.62% Swedish, and 2.21% other.

== See also ==
- Districts of Turku
- Districts of Turku by population
