= Jänessaari =

District of Turku, Finland

Coordinates: 60°25′19″N 22°10′51″E

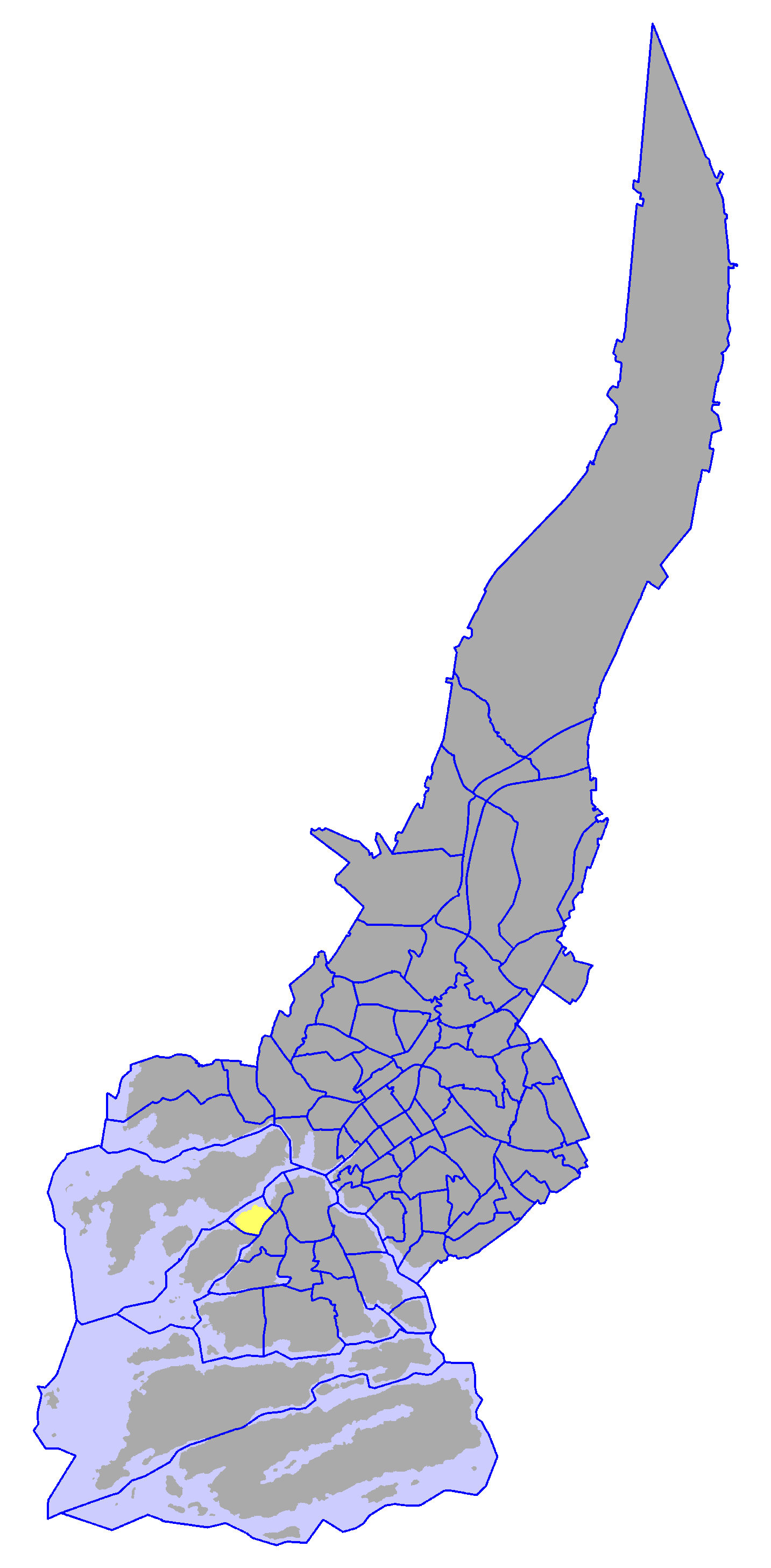
Jänessaari on a map of Turku.

Jänessaari is a district of the city of Turku, in Finland. It is located in the northwestern part of the island of Hirvensalo, off the city's coast.

Jänessaari is one of the smallest districts in Turku, with a population of only 37 (as of 2015). 11.54% of the district's population are under 15 years old, while 26.92% are over 65. The district's linguistic makeup is 92.31% Finnish, 3.85% Swedish, and 3.85% other.

== See also ==
- Districts of Turku
- Districts of Turku by population
