= Särkilahti =

City district in Turku, Finland

Coordinates: 60°24′50″N 22°11′35″E

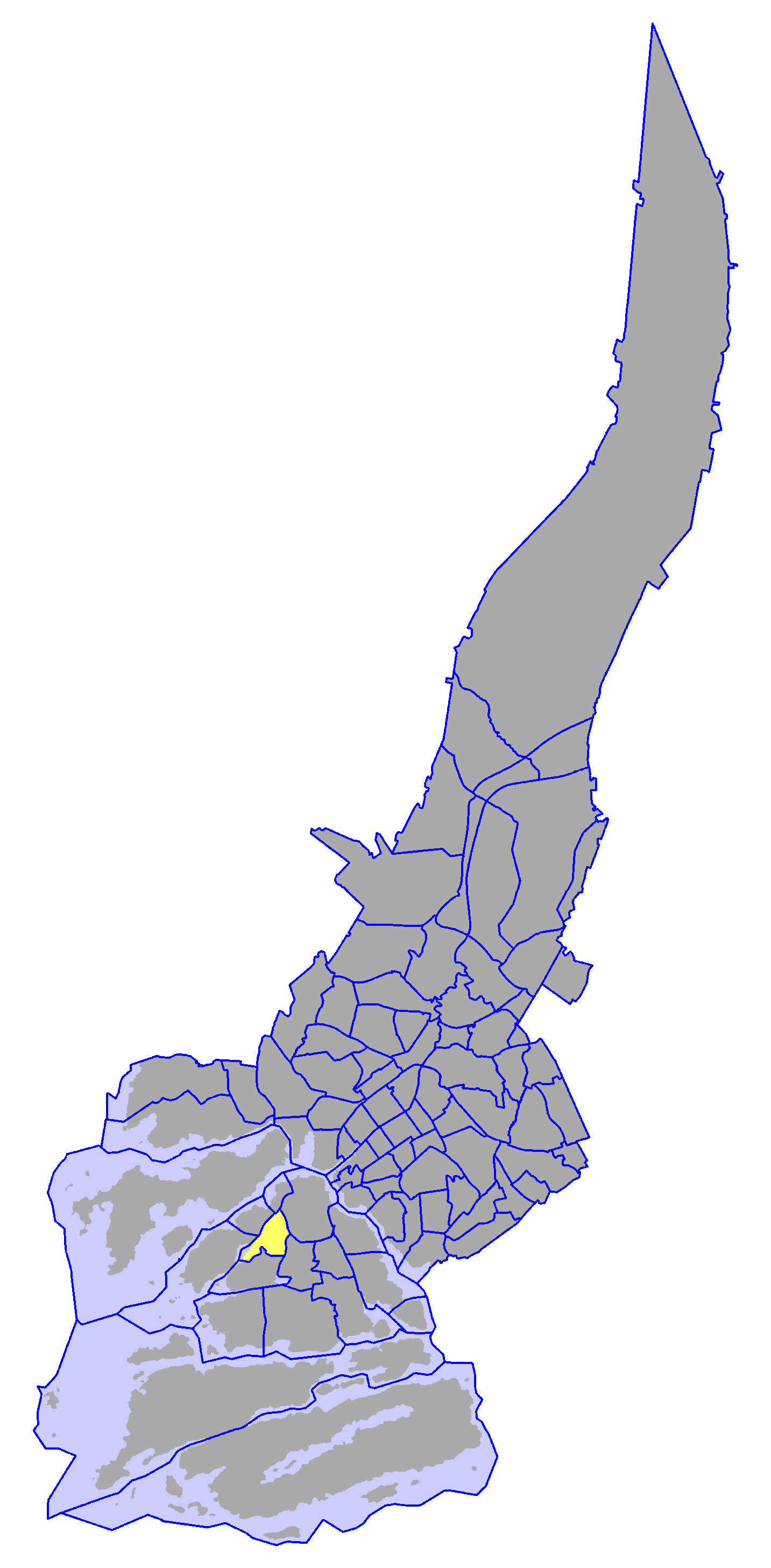
Särkilahti on a map of Turku.

Särkilahti is a district of the city of Turku, in Finland. It is located in the central part of the island of Hirvensalo, off the city's coastline. The second of the two schools on Hirvensalo is located in Särkilahti.

The current (as of 2004) population of Särkilahti is 111, and it is decreasing at an annual rate of 1.80%. 10.81% of the district's population are under 15 years old, while 23.42% are over 65. The district's linguistic makeup is 91.89% Finnish, 6.31% Swedish, and 1.80% other.

== See also ==
- Districts of Turku
- Districts of Turku by population
