= Oriniemi =

District of Turku, Finland

Coordinates: 60°23′42″N 22°9′57″E

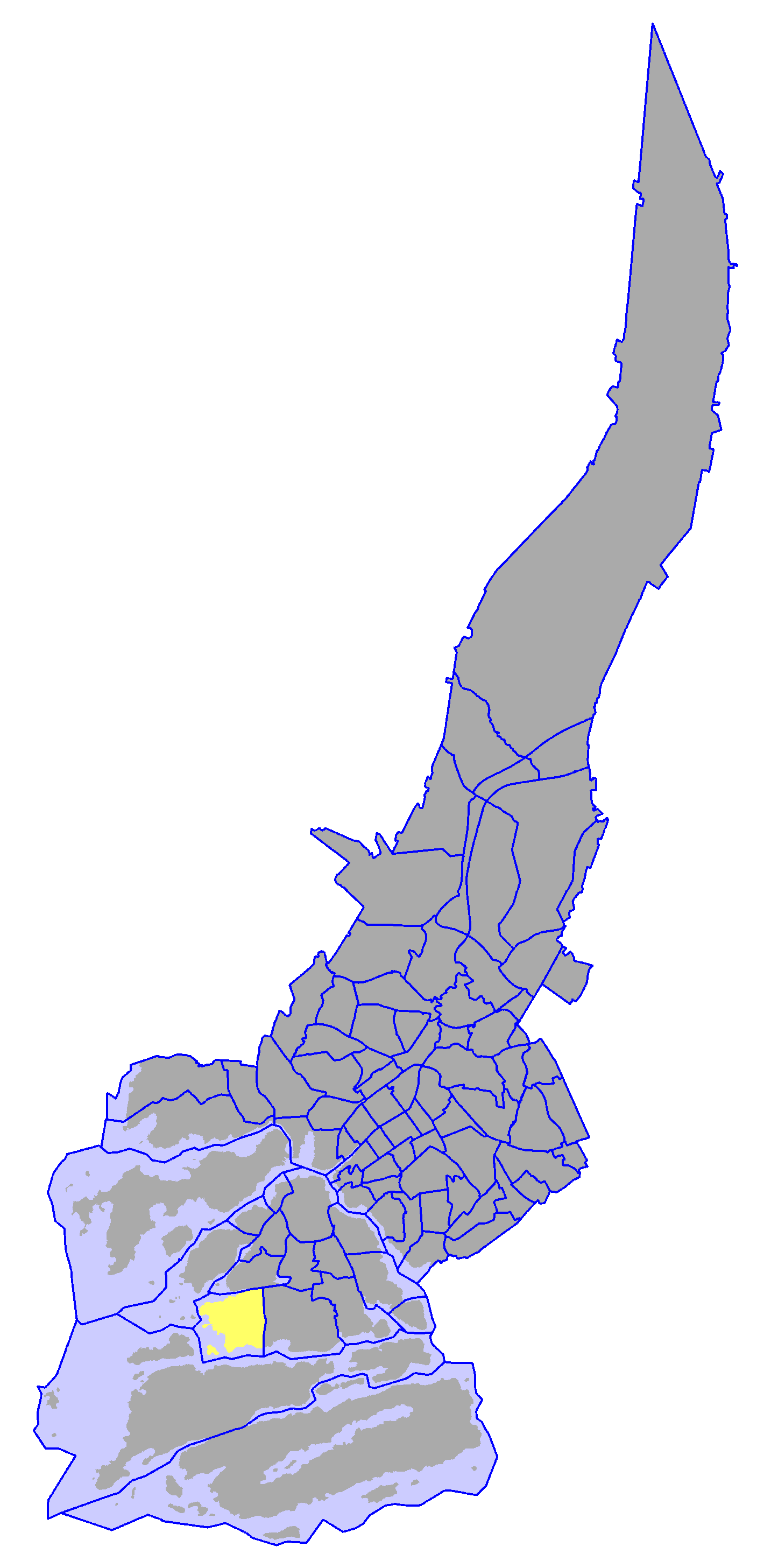
Oriniemi on a map of Turku.

Oriniemi is a district of the city of Turku, in Finland. It is located in the southwestern part of the island of Hirvensalo, off the city's coastline. The district also includes the island of Nepo between Hirvensalo and Satava.

The current (as of 2004) population of Haarla is 161, and it is increasing at an annual rate of 3.11%. 16.15% of the district's population are under 15 years old, while 11.18% are over 65. The district's linguistic makeup is 95.03% Finnish, and 4.97% Swedish.

== See also ==
- Districts of Turku
- Districts of Turku by population
