= Maanpää =

City district in Turku, Finland

Coordinates: 60°24′30″N 22°9′40″E

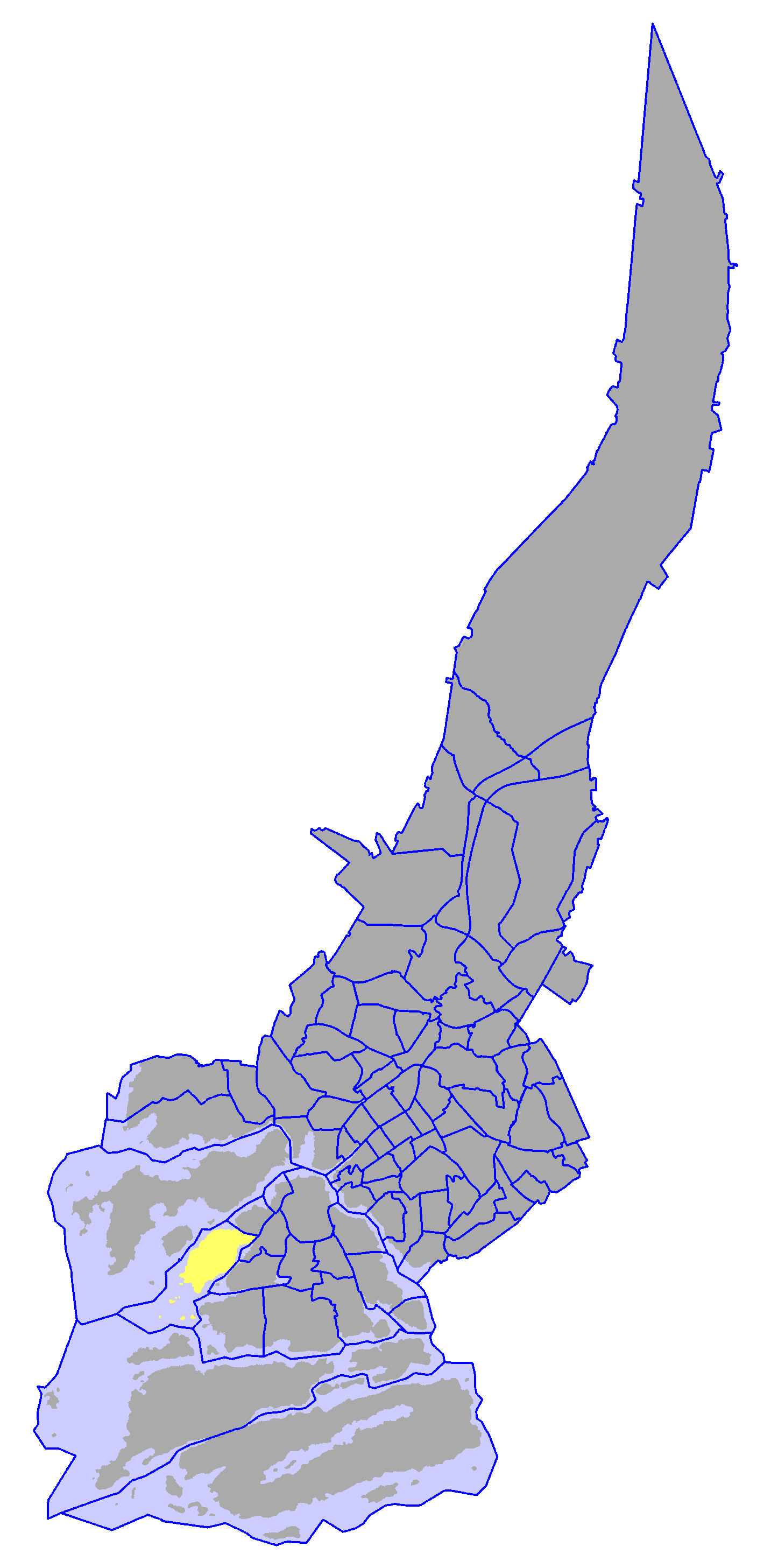
Maanpää on a map of Turku.

Maanpää is a district of the city of Turku, in Finland. It is located in the western part of the island of Hirvensalo, off the city's coastline, and in the ward of Hirvensalo-Kakskerta (Ward 2). The district also includes some small islands to the west of Hirvensalo.

The current (as of 2015) population of Maanpää is 107. As of 2004, 18.69% of the district's population were under 15 years old, while 14.95% were over 65. The district's linguistic makeup was 94.39% Finnish, 4.67% Swedish, and 0.93% other.

== See also ==
- Districts of Turku
- Districts of Turku by population
