= 1st Senate district =

1st senate district may refer to:

- Alabama's 1st Senate district
- California's 1st State Senatorial district
- Colorado's 1st Senate district
- Delaware's 1st Senate district
- Florida's 1st Senate district
- Georgia's 1st Senate district
- Indiana's 1st Senate district
- Iowa's 1st Senate district
- Kansas's 1st Senate district
- Massachusetts Senate's 1st Middlesex district
- Michigan's 1st Senate district
- Nevada's 1st Senate district
- New York's 1st State Senate district
- Oregon's 1st Senate district
- Poland's 1st Senate district
- Tennessee's 1st Senate district
- Utah's 1st State Senate district
- Virginia's 1st Senate district
- Wisconsin's 1st Senate district
- West Virginia's 1st Senate district

== See also ==
- 1st District, Austria
- District 1 (disambiguation)
