= Moikoinen =

District of Turku, Finland

Coordinates: 60°24′45″N 22°14′15″E

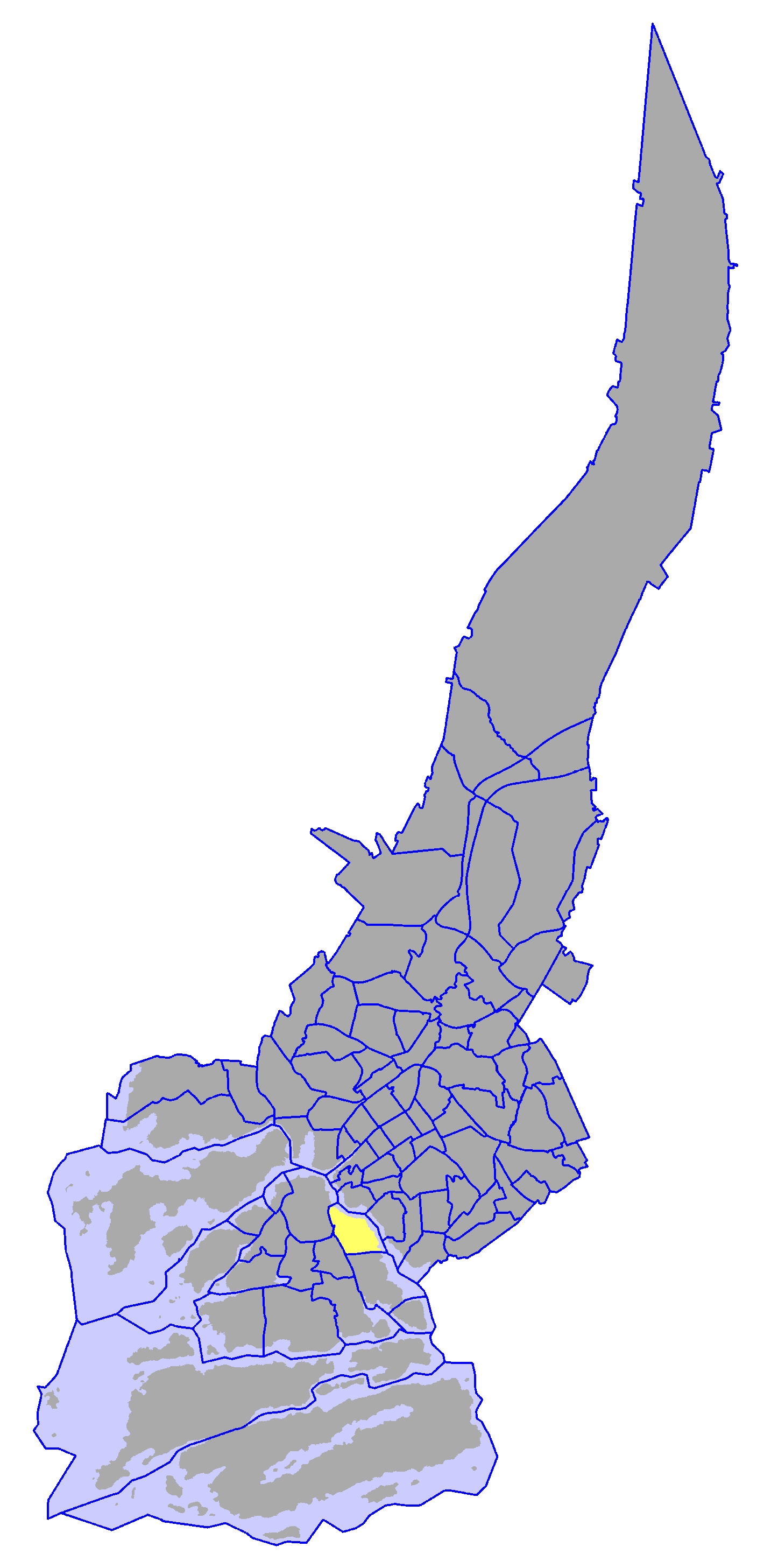
Moikoinen on a map of Turku.

Moikoinen (Finnish; Moikois in Swedish) is a district and a suburb of the city of Turku, in Finland. It is located in the eastern part of the island of Hirvensalo, off the city's coastline. Moikoinen, along with Kukola, is the main settlement on the island, and includes many services such as shops, a church, and a youth centre.

The current (as of 2004) population of Moikoinen is 1,880, and it is decreasing at an annual rate of 4.15%. 19.68% of the district's population are under 15 years old, while 6.76% are over 65. The district's linguistic makeup is 89.95% Finnish, 8.24% Swedish, and 1.81% other.

== See also ==
- Districts of Turku
- Districts of Turku by population
