= Kakskerta Church =

- Kakskerran kirkko Kakskerta kyrka
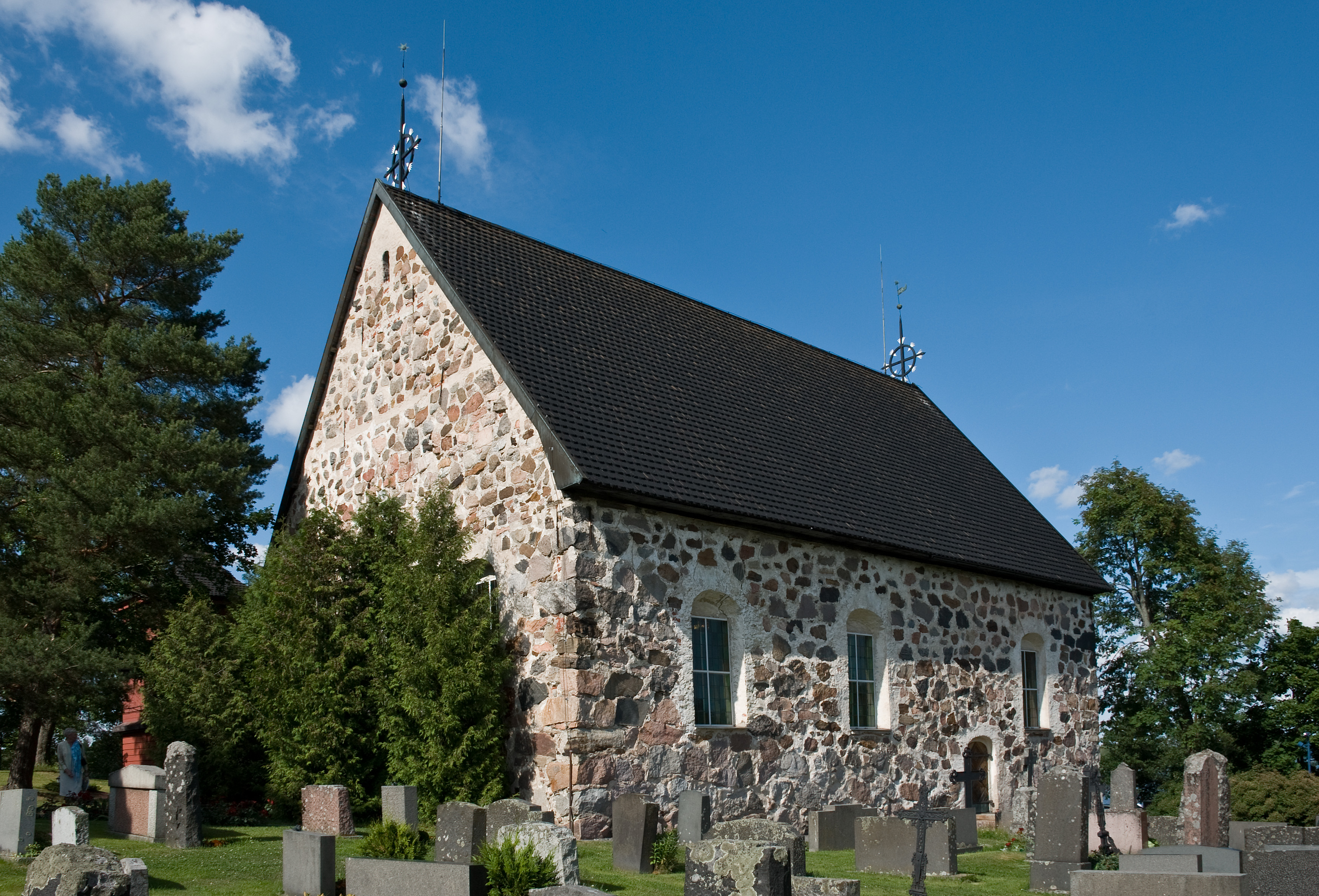
- Kakskerta Church, south side
- Kakskerta Church
- 60°22′12″N 022°13′10.5″E
- Location: Kakskerta, Turku
- Country: Finland

History
- Status: Completed
- Dedicated: 1770

Architecture
- Architect: Christian Schroder
- Completed: 1765–1769

Kakskerta Church (Finnish: Kakskerran kirkko, Swedish: Kakskerta kyrka) is located in Turku, Finland on the island Kakskerta. The seaside church is one of the three churches in the Turku Martin parish. According to legend, the local fishermen got a surprise from the sea with a huge catch of delicious fish. They believed that the area was blessed, and the residents of the island decided to build their own church.

Kakskerta Church was built in between 1765 and 1769, and dedicated in 1770. It was designed by Christian Schroder, and is oblong in shape. The altarpiece is from the 17th century, and nearly the whole interior of the church was renovated in 1940 under plans by architect Erik Bryggman. The belfry was designed by C. Bassi in 1824.
