= Korppolaismäki =

City district in Turku, Finland

Coordinates: 60°25′52″N 22°14′9″E

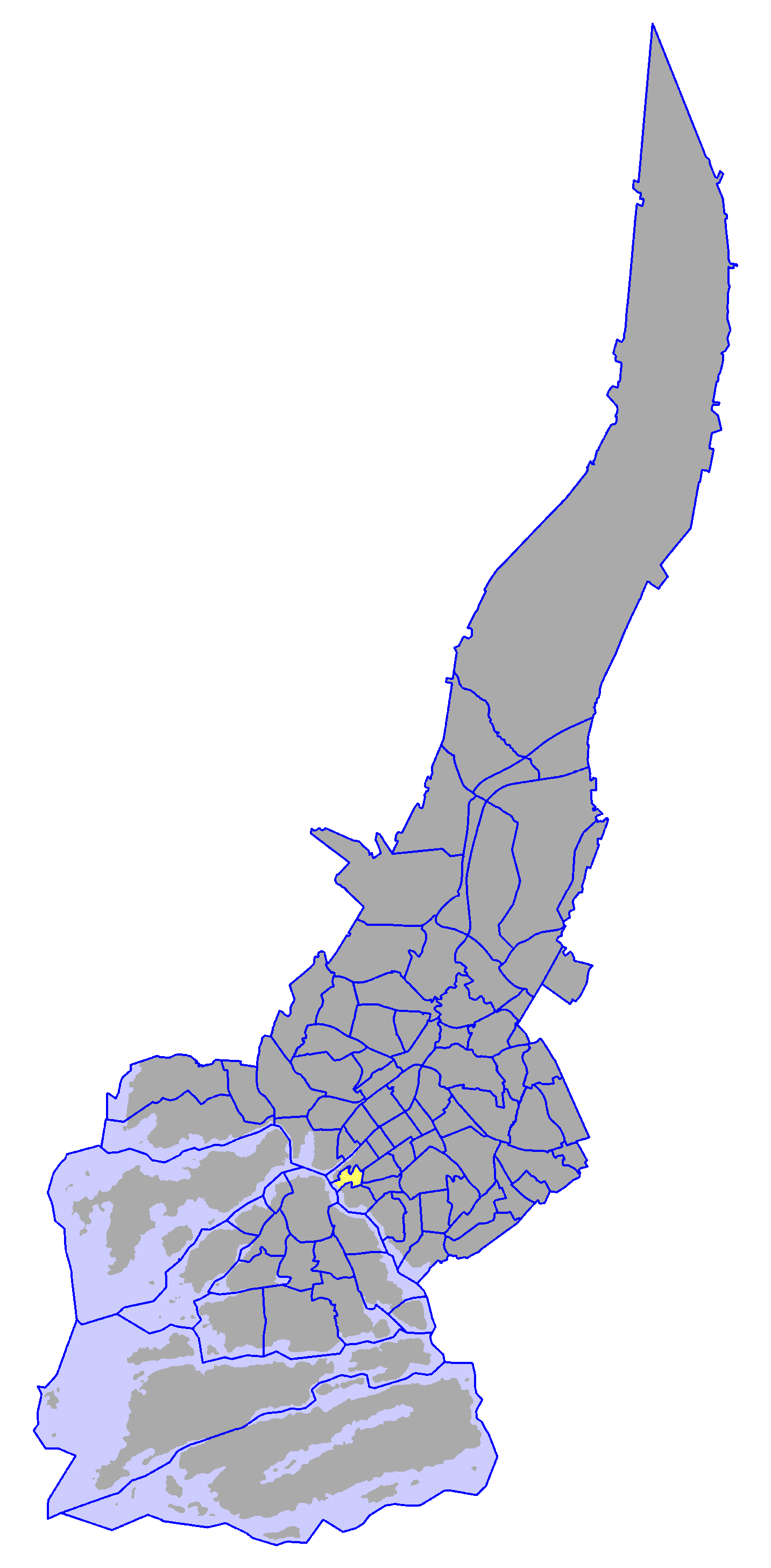
Korppolaismäki on a map of Turku.

Korppolaismäki (Finnish; Korpolaisbacken in Swedish) is a district of the city of Turku, in Finland. It is located to the south of the city centre, on the eastern side of the mouth of the river Aura. The district shares the new luxurious residential area of Majakkaranta with the neighbouring district of Pihlajaniemi.

The population of Korppolaismäki in 2004 was 349, and was increasing at an annual rate of 0.29%. 19.20% of the district's population was under 15 years old, while 12.32% were over 65. The district's linguistic makeup is 87.68% Finnish, 10.32% Swedish, and 2.01% other languages.

== See also ==
- Districts of Turku
- Districts of Turku by population
