= Friskala =

City district in Turku, Finland

Coordinates: 60°23′45″N 22°15′00″E

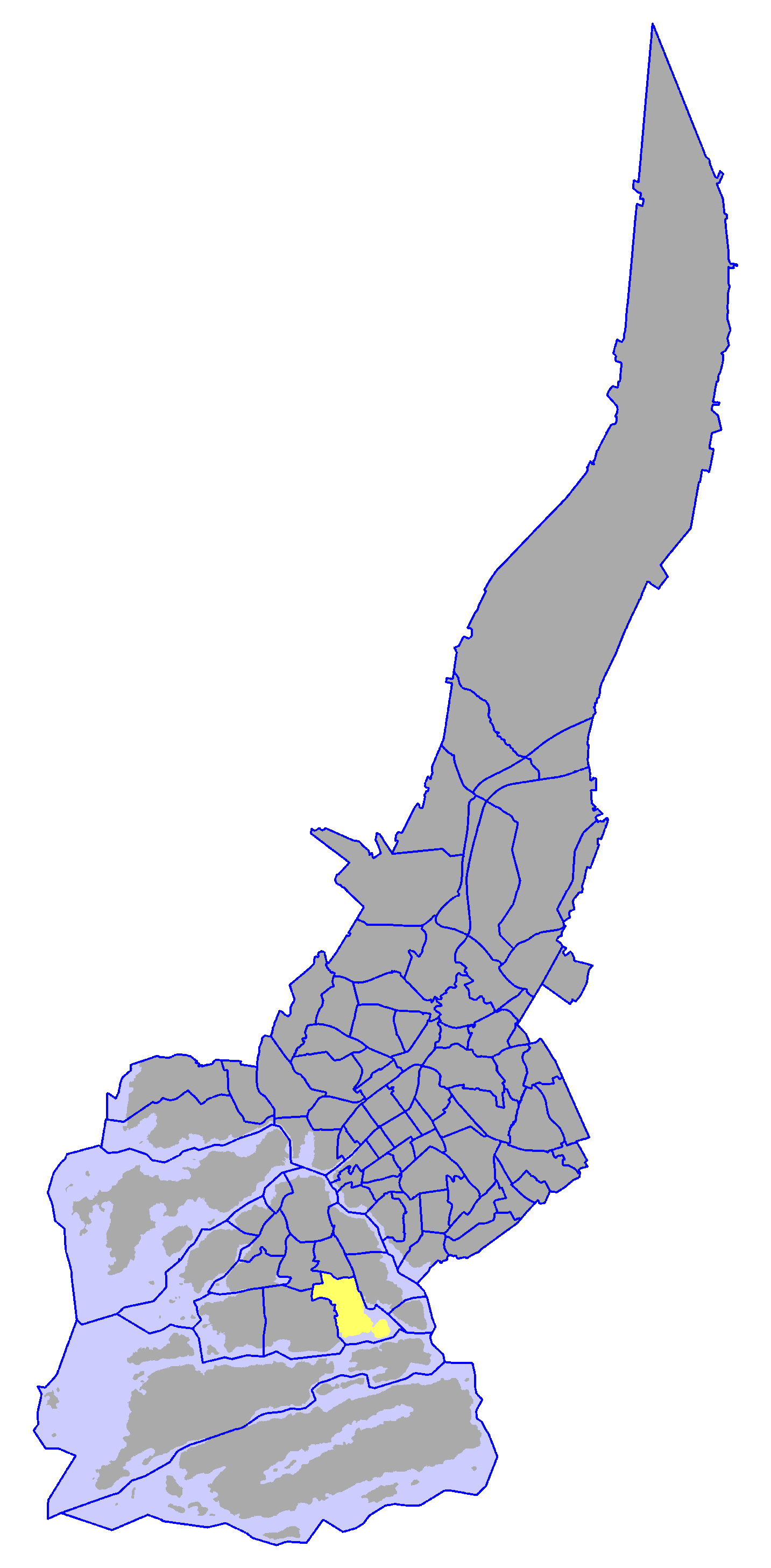
Friskala on a map of Turku.

Friskala is a district of the city of Turku, in Finland. It is located in the southeastern part of the island of Hirvensalo, off the city's coast. The district also includes the small island of Iso-Vihtilä.

Friskala is one of the smallest districts in Turku, with a population of only 23 (as of 2004). The population is, however, increasing at an annual rate of 13.04%. 13.04% of the district's population are under 15 years old, while 13.04% are over 65. 100% of the district's inhabitants speak Finnish as their native language.

== See also ==
- Districts of Turku
- Districts of Turku by population
