= Toijainen =

District of Turku, Finland

Coordinates: 60°25′0″N 22°13′10″E

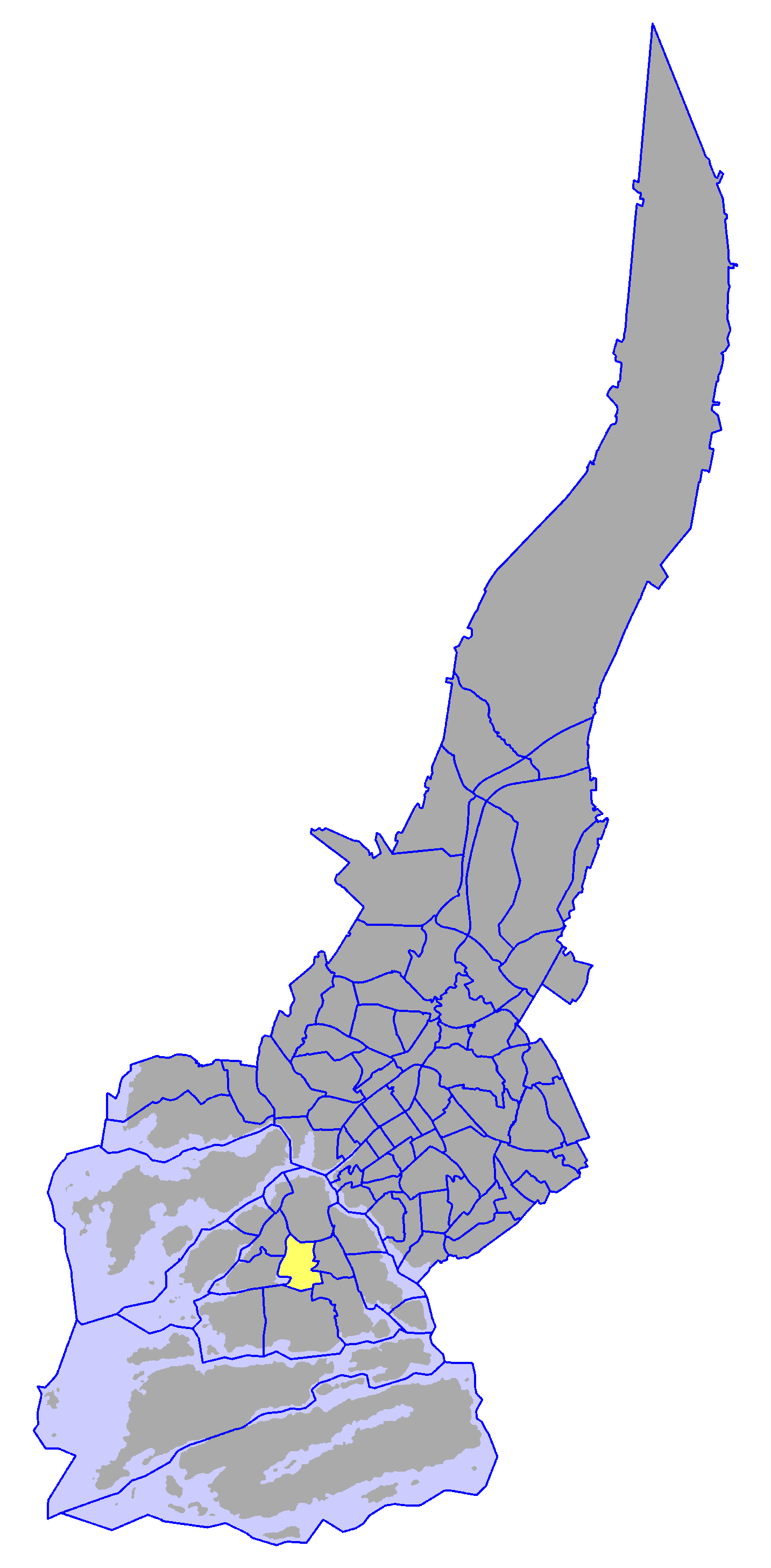
Toijainen on a map of Turku.

Toijainen (Finnish; Toijais in Swedish) is a district and a suburb of the city of Turku, in Finland. It is located in the central part of the island of Hirvensalo, off the city's coastline.

The current (as of 2004) population of Toijainen is 102, and it is increasing at an annual rate of 24.51%. 25.49% of the district's population are under 15 years old, while 15.69% are over 65. The district's linguistic makeup is 87.25% Finnish and 12.75% Swedish.

== See also ==
- Districts of Turku
- Districts of Turku by population
