= Papinsaari =

District of Turku, Finland

Coordinates: 60°23′37″N 22°16′20″E

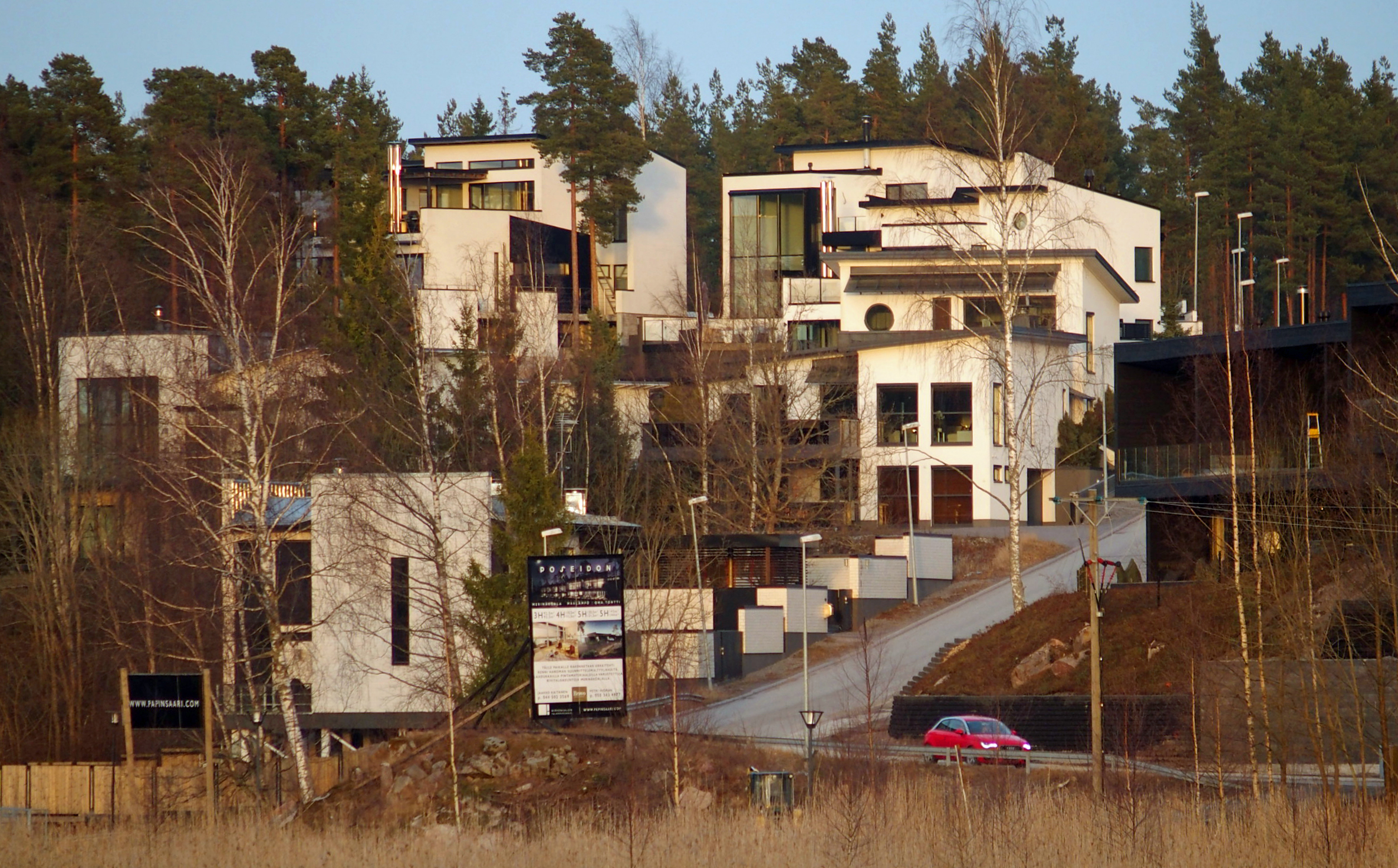
Papinsaari seen from Kaistarniemi.

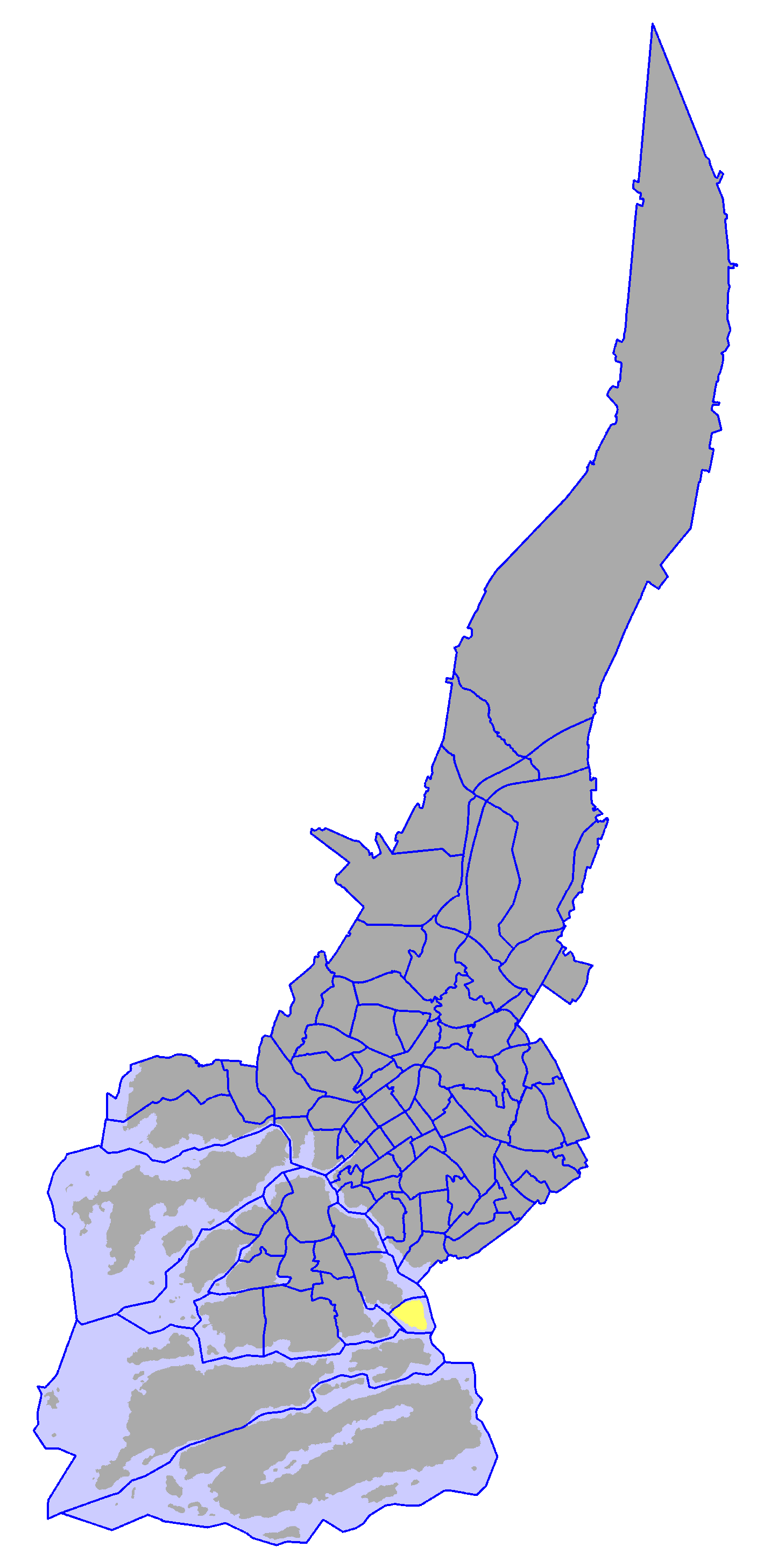
Papinsaari on a map of Turku.

Papinsaari is a district of the city of Turku, in Finland. It is located in the southeastern extremity of the island of Hirvensalo, off the city's coastline.

As of 2004, the population of Papinsaari is 158, but is rapidly increasing at an annual rate of 28.48%. 29.75% of the district's population are under 15 years old, while 4.43% are over 65. The district's linguistic makeup is 94.94% Finnish, and 5.06% Swedish.

== See also ==
- Districts of Turku
- Districts of Turku by population
