= Districts of Turku by population =

This is a list of the districts of Turku, Finland, sorted by population as of 2004.

1. Runosmäki (Runosbacken), 10,269
2. Varissuo (Kråkkärret), 8,760
3. VII, 8,749
4. Nummi (Nummis), 7,011
5. VI, 6,187
6. I, 6,177
7. VIII - Port Arthur, 4,760
8. Pääskyvuori (Svalberga), 4,482
9. Luolavuori, 4,477
10. Pahaniemi, 4,397
11. IV - Martti (Martins), 4,357
12. Vasaramäki (Hammarbacka), 3,949
13. Harittu, 3,870
14. V - Itäranta (Öststranden), 3,677
15. Uittamo, 3,635
16. Teräsrautela, 3,554
17. Halinen (Hallis), 3,501
18. Jäkärlä, 3,460
19. Lauste (Laustis), 3,405
20. III, 3,222
21. Vätti, 2,990
22. Kurala, 2,956
23. Itäharju (Österås), 2,940
24. II, 2,919
25. Pansio, 2,905
26. Ilpoinen (Ilpois), 2,889
27. Pitkämäki (Långbacka), 2,886
28. Perno, 2,513
29. Paattinen (Patis), 2,430
30. Ruohonpää, 2,375
31. Yli-Maaria (Övre S:t Marie), 2,209
32. Kaerla, 2,182
33. Kärsämäki, 2,021
34. Kastu, 2,002
35. Räntämäki, 1,924
36. Iso-Heikkilä (Storheikkilä), 1,905
37. Moikoinen (Moikois), 1,880
38. Koivula (Björkas), 1,761
39. Mälikkälä, 1,608
40. Pohjola (Norrstan), 1,569
41. Mäntymäki (Tallbacka), 1,489
42. Kukola, 1,486
43. Raunistula, 1,442
44. IX - Länsiranta (Väststranden), 1,386
45. Haarla (Harlax), 1,316
46. Katariina (Katarina), 1,282
47. Kohmo, 1,223
48. Vähäheikkilä (Lillheikkilä), 1,153
49. Pihlajaniemi (Rönnudden), 1,139
50. Huhkola, 986
51. Vaala (Svalas), 972
52. Kähäri, 934
53. Peltola, 778
54. Satava, 764
55. Puistomäki (Parkbacken), 734
56. Kurjenmäki (Tranbacken), 679
57. Kakskerta, 633
58. Kaistarniemi (Kaistarudden), 630
59. Saramäki (Starbacka), 530
60. Ispoinen (Ispois), 480
61. Korppolaismäki (Korppolaisbacken), 349
62. Lauttaranta (Färjstranden), 236
63. Pikisaari (Beckholmen), 226
64. Oriniemi, 161
65. Papinsaari, 158
66. Skanssi (Skansen), 141
67. Turku Airport (Turun lentoasema / Åbo flygstation), 127
68. Ruissalo (Runsala), 126
69. Oriketo, 120
70. Särkilahti, 111
71. Maanpää, 107
72. Toijainen (Toijais), 102
73. Illoinen (Illois), 85
74. Artukainen (Artukais), 78
75. Port of Turku (Turun satama / Åbo hamn), 44
76. Jänessaari, 26
77. Koroinen (Korois), 26
78. Friskala, 23
79. Kupittaa (Kuppis), 9
