= Satava =

Island and city district in Turku, Finland

Coordinates: 60°22′N 22°10′E

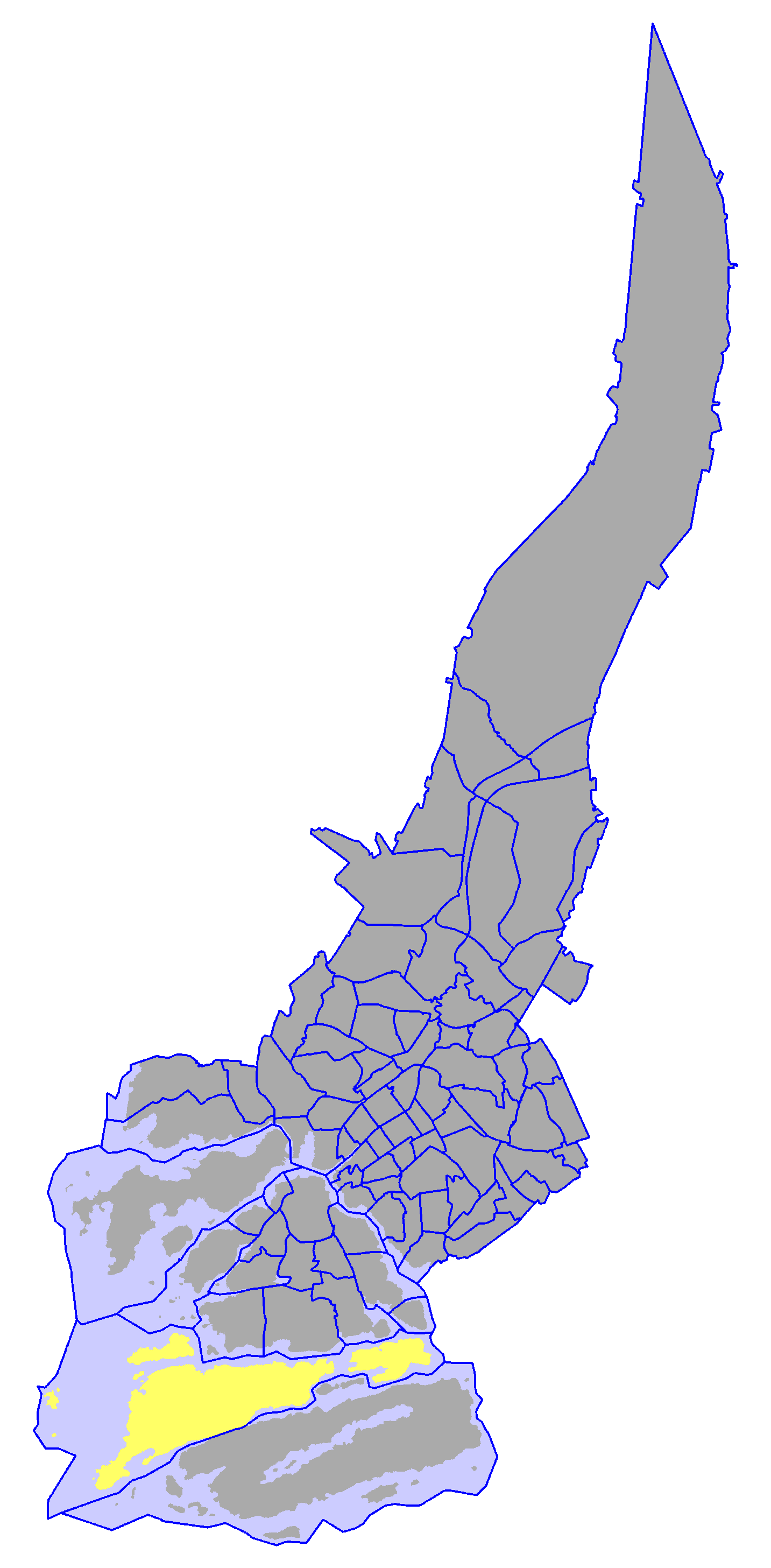
Satava on a map of Turku.

Satava is a large island in the Archipelago Sea, on the southwest coast of Finland. Satava island is a part of the district of Turku, the oldest city in Finland. Satava is located between the islands, Hirvensalo and Kakskerta. As with many Finnish islands, Satava hosts many summer residences and Ekvalla beach is a popular tourist destination spot on the island. The Turku district also contains neighbouring islands, such as Kulho and Järvistensaari.

The current (as of 2005) population of the Satava island district is 781, and it is increasing at an annual rate of 2.22%. 18.43% of the population are under 15 years old, while 15.75% are over 65. The district's linguistic makeup is 94.49% Finnish, 4.61% Swedish, and 0.90% other.

Satava was annexed to Turku in 1968 as a part of Kakskerta municipality.

== See also ==
- Districts of Turku
- Districts of Turku by population
