= Pihlajaniemi =

District of Turku, Finland

Coordinates: 60°25′30″N 22°14′20″E

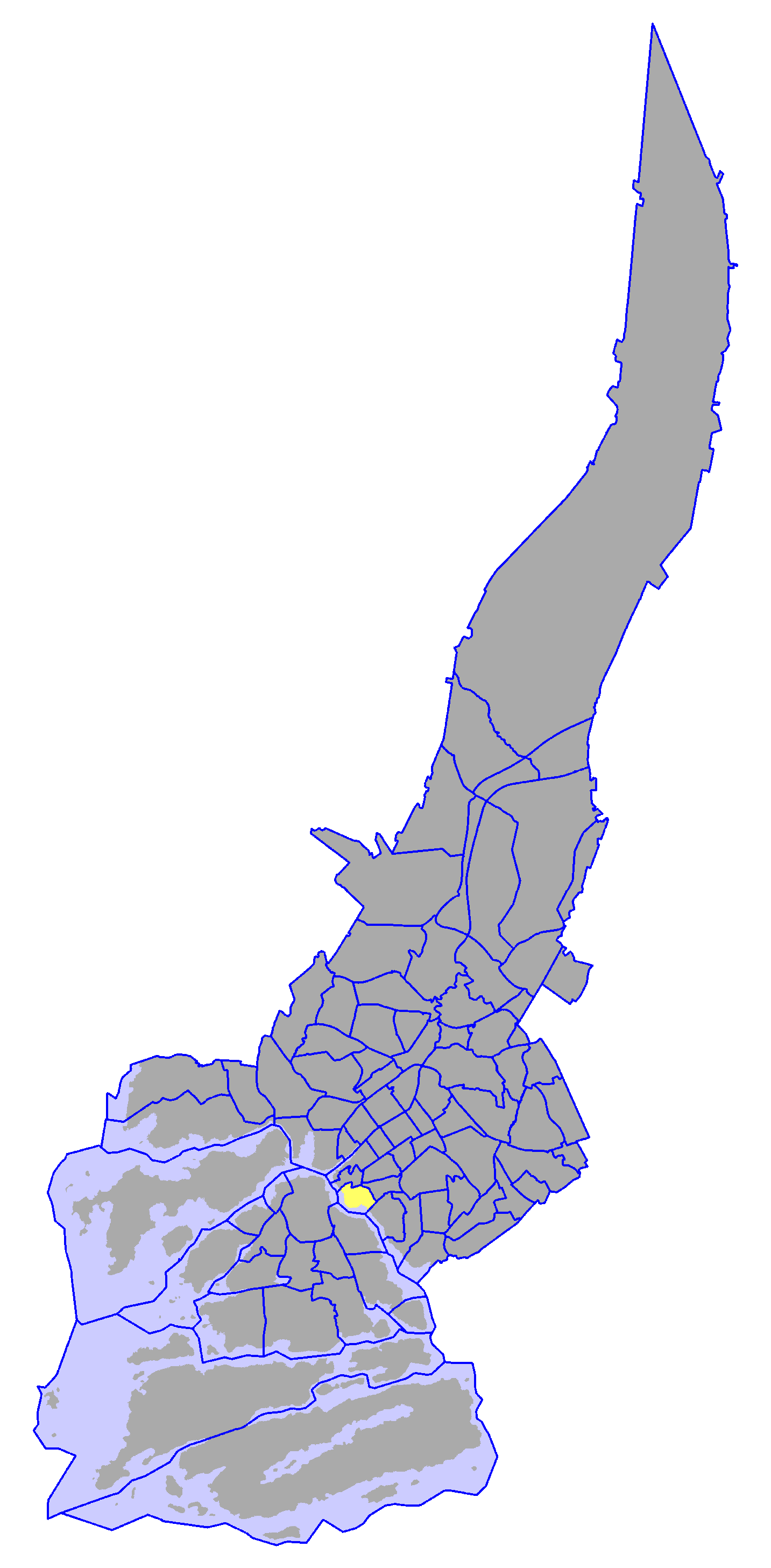
Pihlajaniemi on a map of Turku.

Pihlajaniemi (Finnish; Rönnudden in Swedish) is a district of the city of Turku, in Finland. It is located to the south of the city centre, on the coastline of the Archipelago Sea. Pihlajaniemi shares the new luxurious residential development of Majakkaranta with the neighbouring district of Korppolaismäki. Finnish Naval Headquarters is located in Pihlajaniemi, at the former garrison of Heikkilä.

The current (as of 2004) population of Pihlajaniemi is 1,139, and it is increasing at an annual rate of 3.69%. 9.13% of the district's population are under 15 years old, while 11.94% are over 65. The district's linguistic makeup is 90.52% Finnish, 5.36% Swedish, and 4.13% other.

== See also ==
- Districts of Turku
- Districts of Turku by population
