= I District, Turku =

City district in Turku, Finland

Coordinates: 60°27′15″N 22°17′00″E

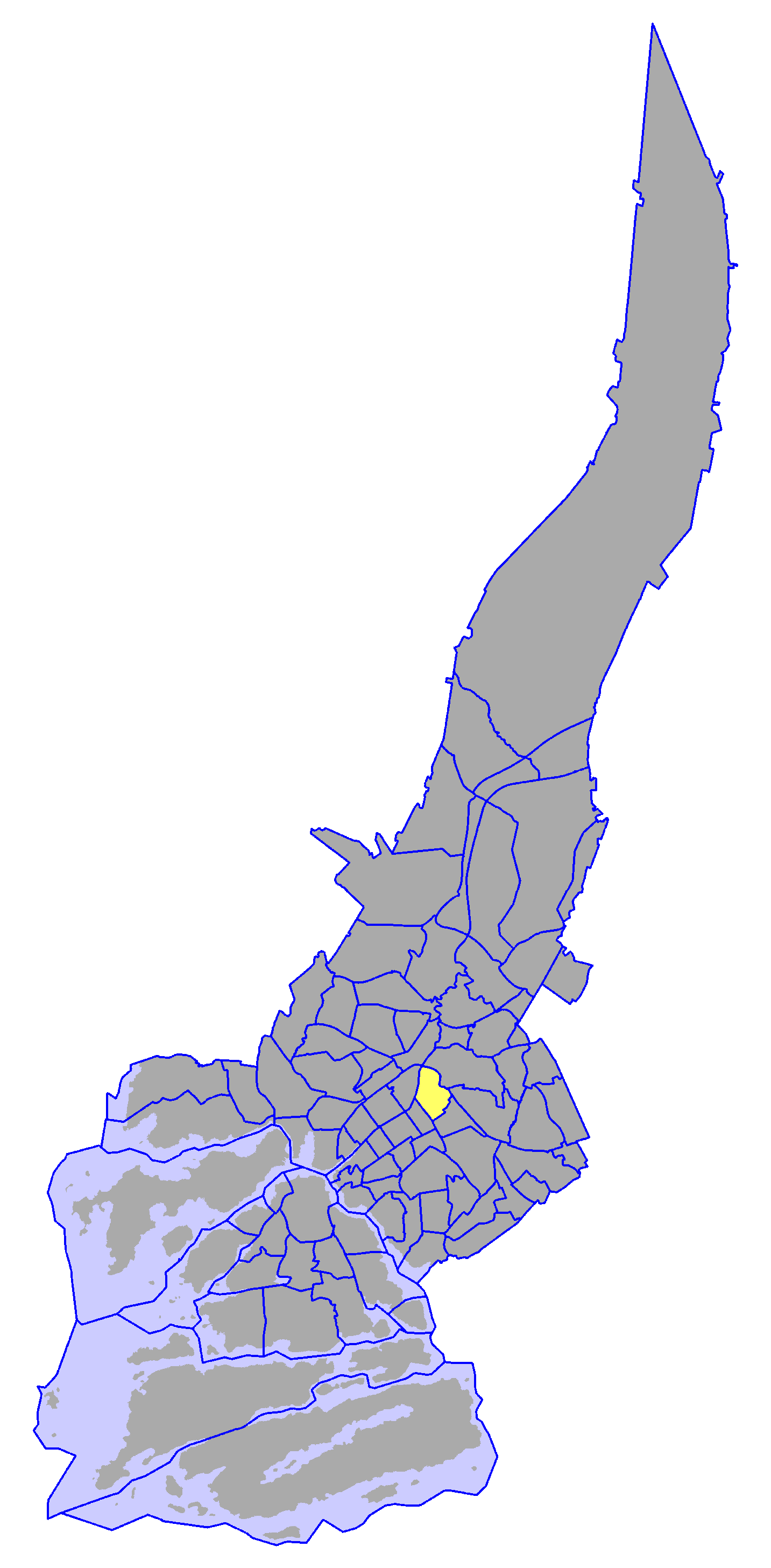
The I District on a map of Turku.

The I District is the easternmost of the central districts of Turku, Finland. It is located on the east side of the river Aura, between Uudenmaankatu and the Helsinki motorway (Finnish national road 1). The main street Hämeenkatu divides the district in Sirkkala and Universities area, and continues as the national road 10 towards Hämeenlinna. The district hosts all three universities of the city, the University of Turku, Åbo Akademi, and the Turku School of Economics and Business Administration. The city's central hospital TYKS is also located in the district, as well as the Cathedral of Turku and the residence of the Archbishop of Finland.

The district is rather densely populated, having a population of 6,177 (as of 2004) and an annual population growth rate of -0.63%. 5.47% of the district's population are under 15 years old, while 18.67% are over 65. The district's linguistic makeup is 85.54% Finnish, 10.94% Swedish, and 3.51% other.

== See also ==
- Districts of Turku
- Districts of Turku by population
