= III District, Turku =

City district in Turku, Finland

Coordinates: 60°26′38″N 22°16′01″E

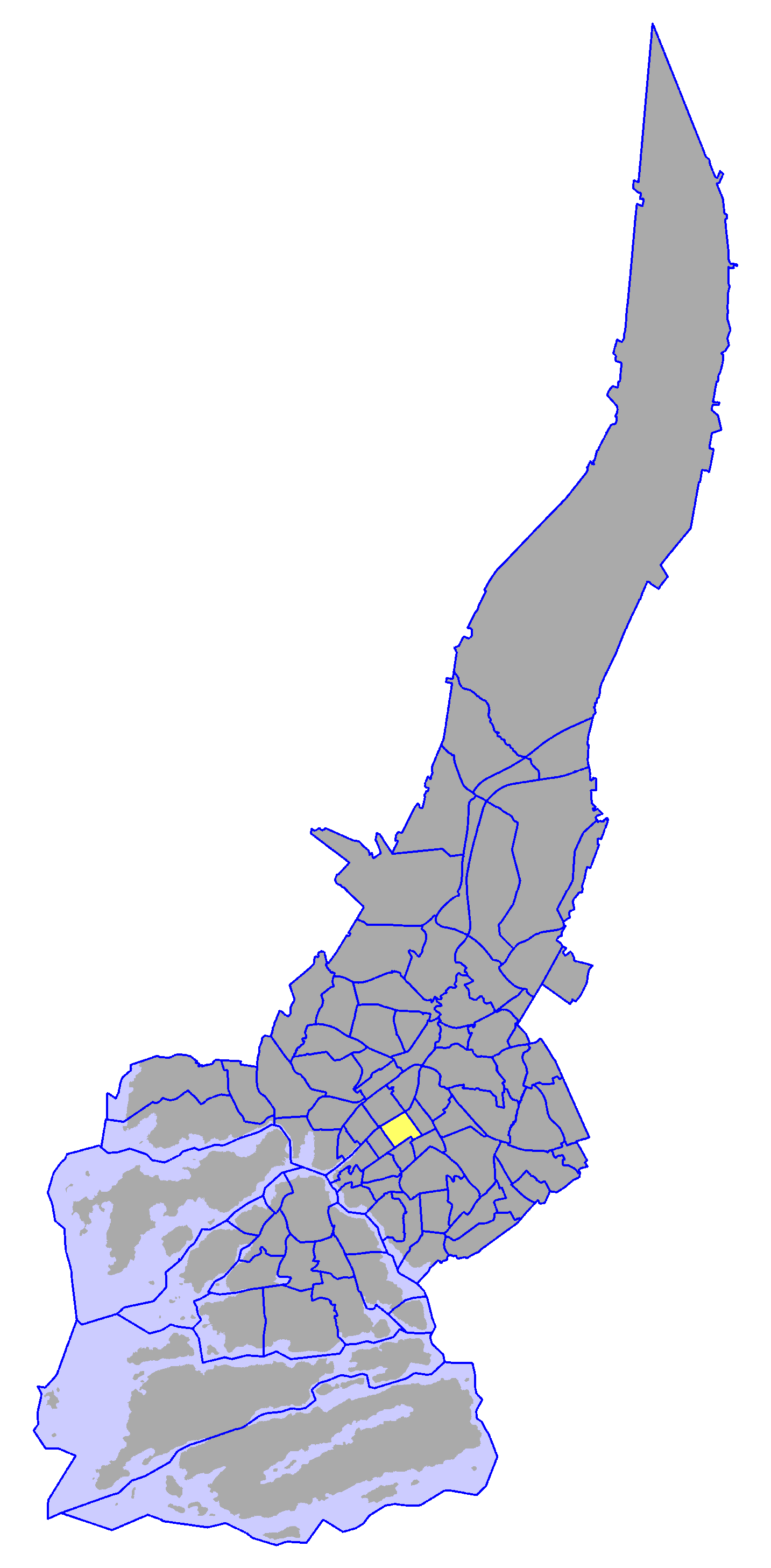
The III District on a map of Turku.

The III District is one of the central districts of Turku, Finland. It is located on the east side of the river Aura, between Kaskenkatu and Martinkatu. The district is largely composed of the Samppalinna sports park, and includes sporting venues such as the Paavo Nurmi Stadion as well as cultural sites such as the city theatre and the Wäinö Aaltonen Museum of Art.

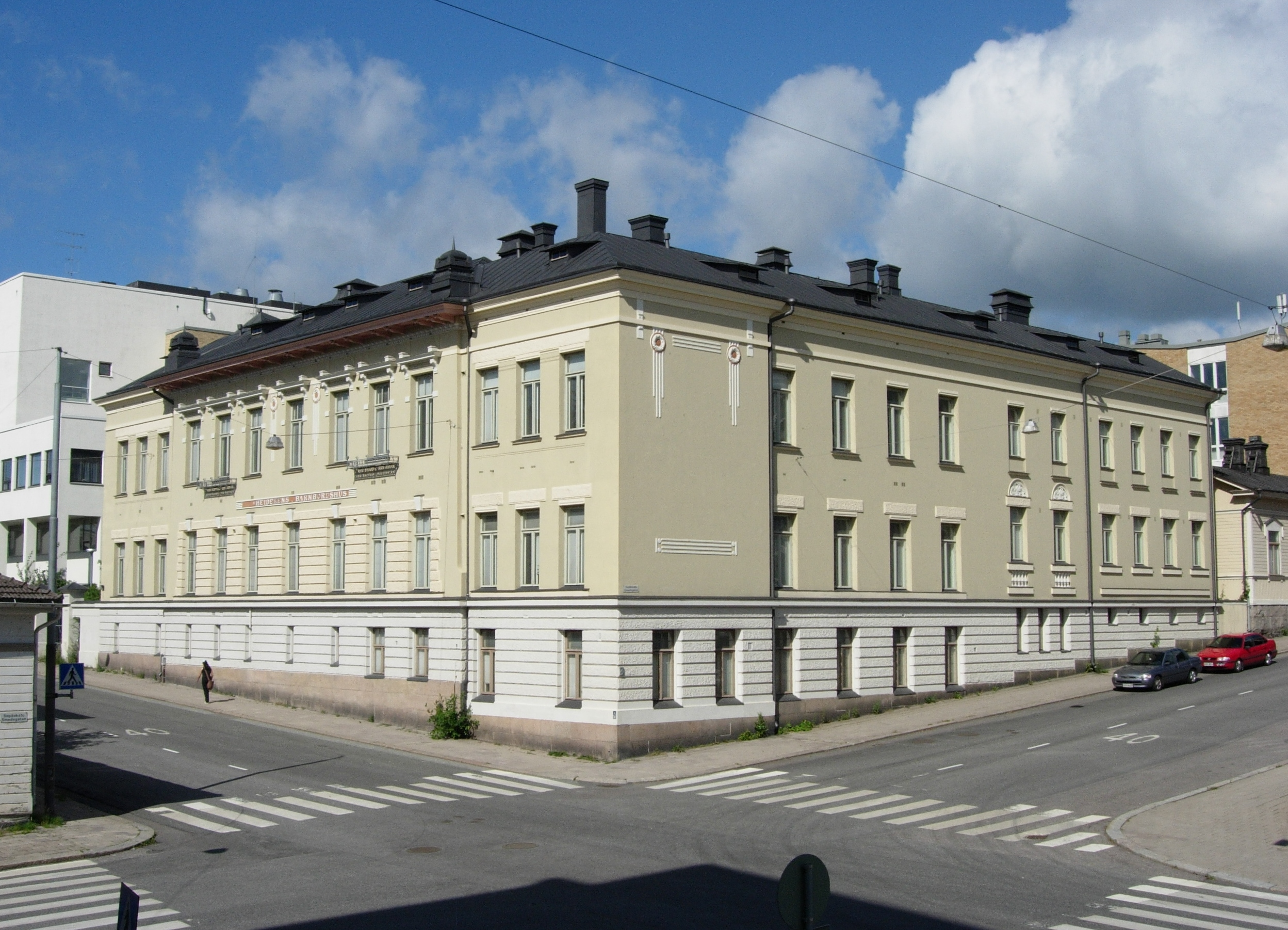
Heideken hospital

Apart from the areas set aside for parks, the district is rather densely populated, and has a population of 168 485 (as of 2019) Turku an annual population growth rate of -2.58%. 5.00% of the district's population are under 15 years old, while 28.58% are over 65. The district's linguistic makeup is 87.18% Finnish, 11.17% Swedish, and 1.64% other.

== See also ==
- Districts of Turku
- Districts of Turku by population
