= Hirvensalo =

Island in Turku, Finland

Coordinates: 60°24′N 22°13′E

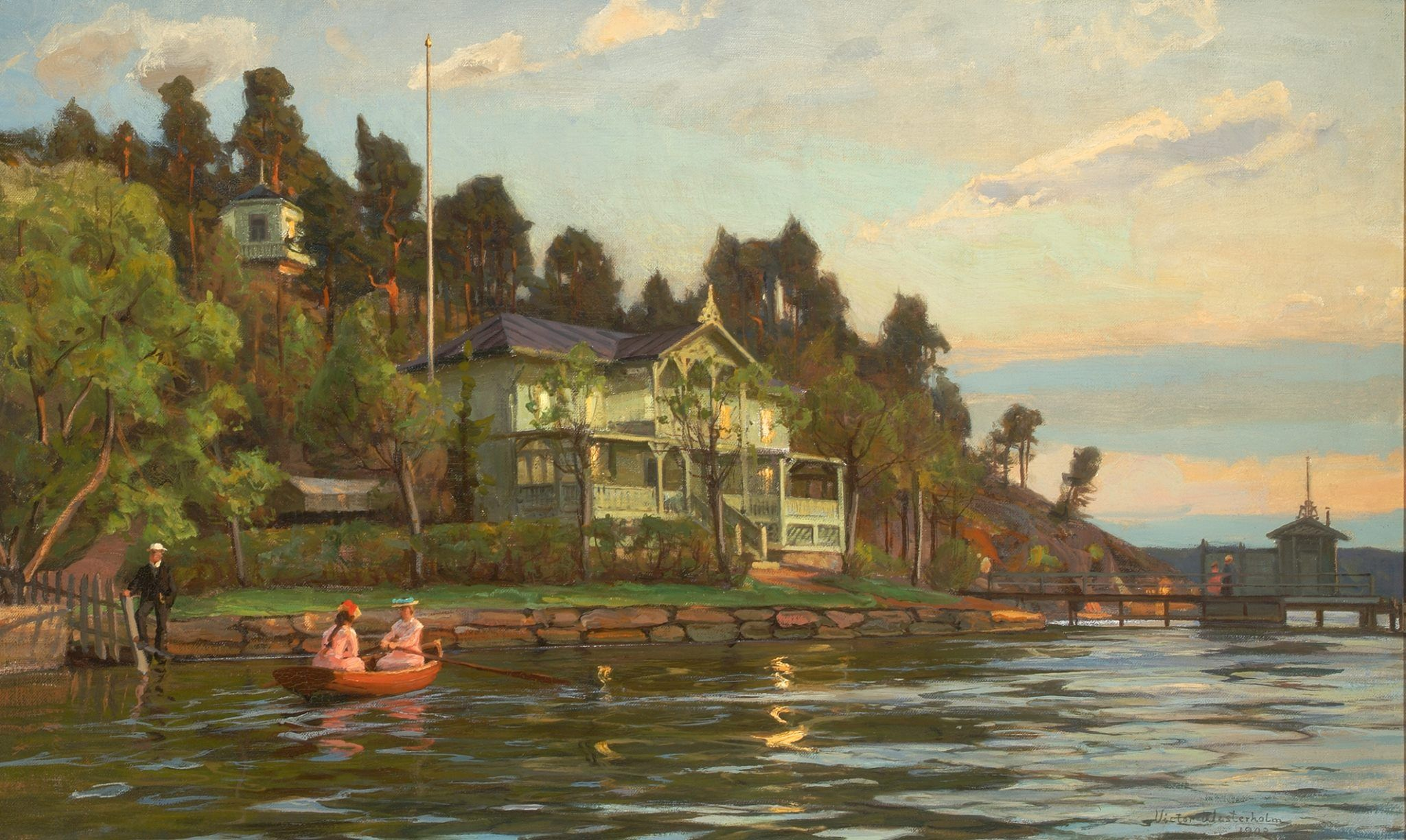
Scene from Hirvensalo by Victor Westerholm in 1903

Hirvensalo is an island in the Archipelago Sea, belonging to the city of Turku, Finland. It is divided into 14 districts, the largest ones being Moikoinen, Kukola and Haarla. Most of the island's economic activity is concentrated in the suburb of Moikoinen, which has a school, shops, a Lutheran church, and a post office. The island's total population is approximately 9,000 (as of 2015).

Hirvensalo was formerly part of the municipality of Maaria, until it was annexed to the city of Turku in 1944.

== Districts of Hirvensalo ==
- Friskala
- Illoinen (Illois)
- Jänessaari
- Kaistarniemi (Kaistarudden)
- Lauttaranta (Färjstranden)
- Maanpää
- Moikoinen (Moikois)
- Oriniemi
- Papinsaari
- Pikisaari (Beckholmen)
- Särkilahti
- Toijainen (Toijais)

== See also ==
- Districts of Turku
- Districts of Turku by population
