= Turku =

City in southwest Finland

Turku Åbo (Swedish)
- City
- Turun kaupunki Åbo stad City of Turku
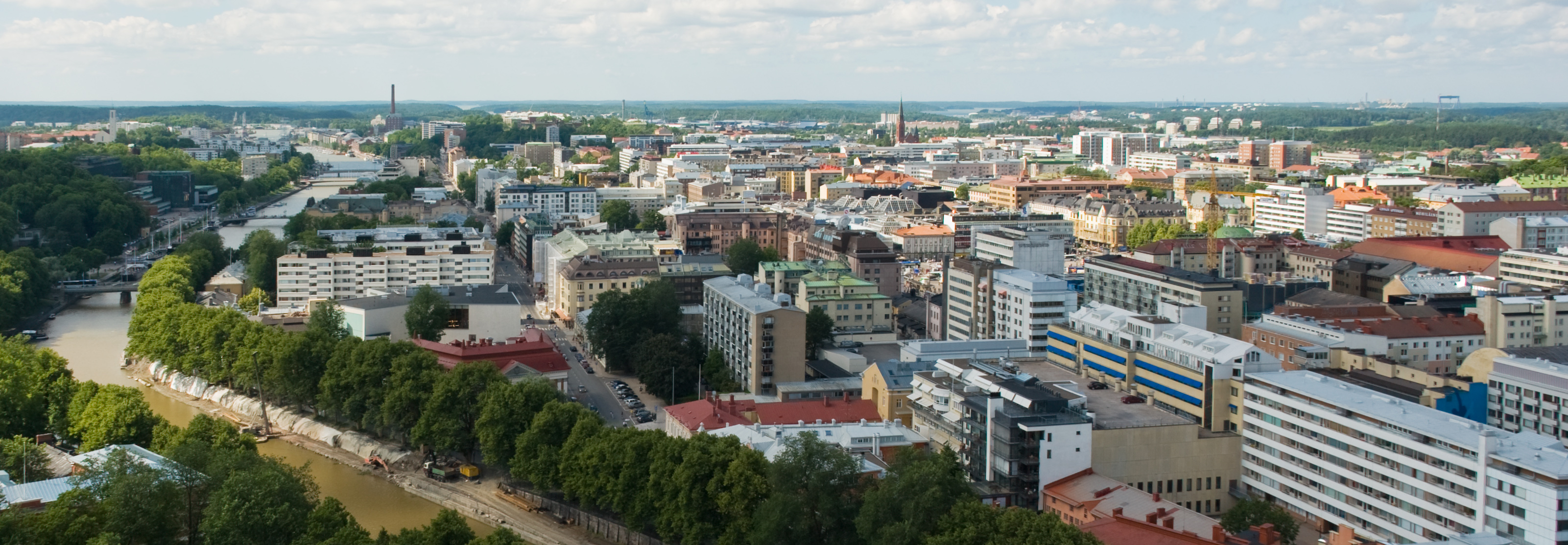
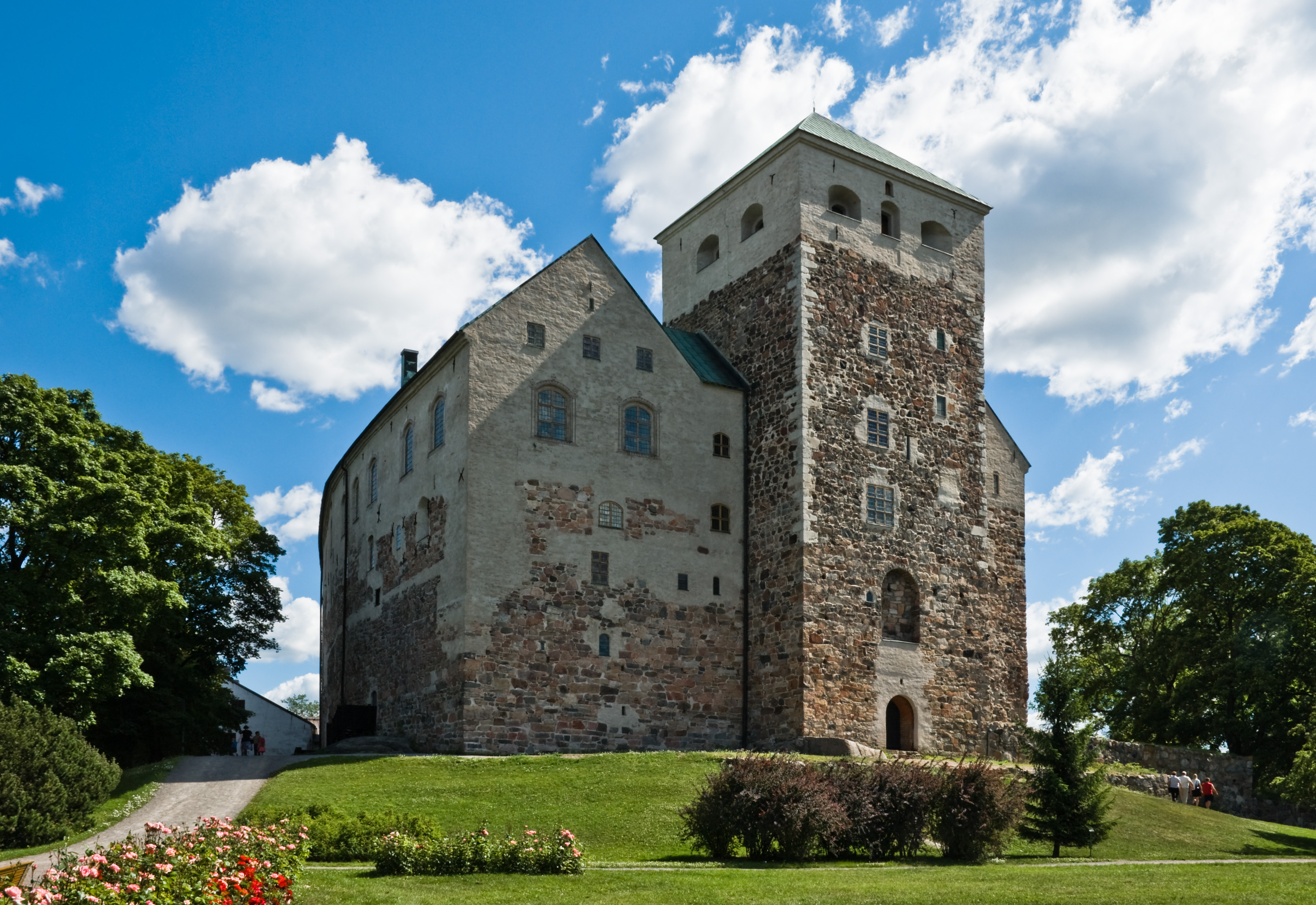
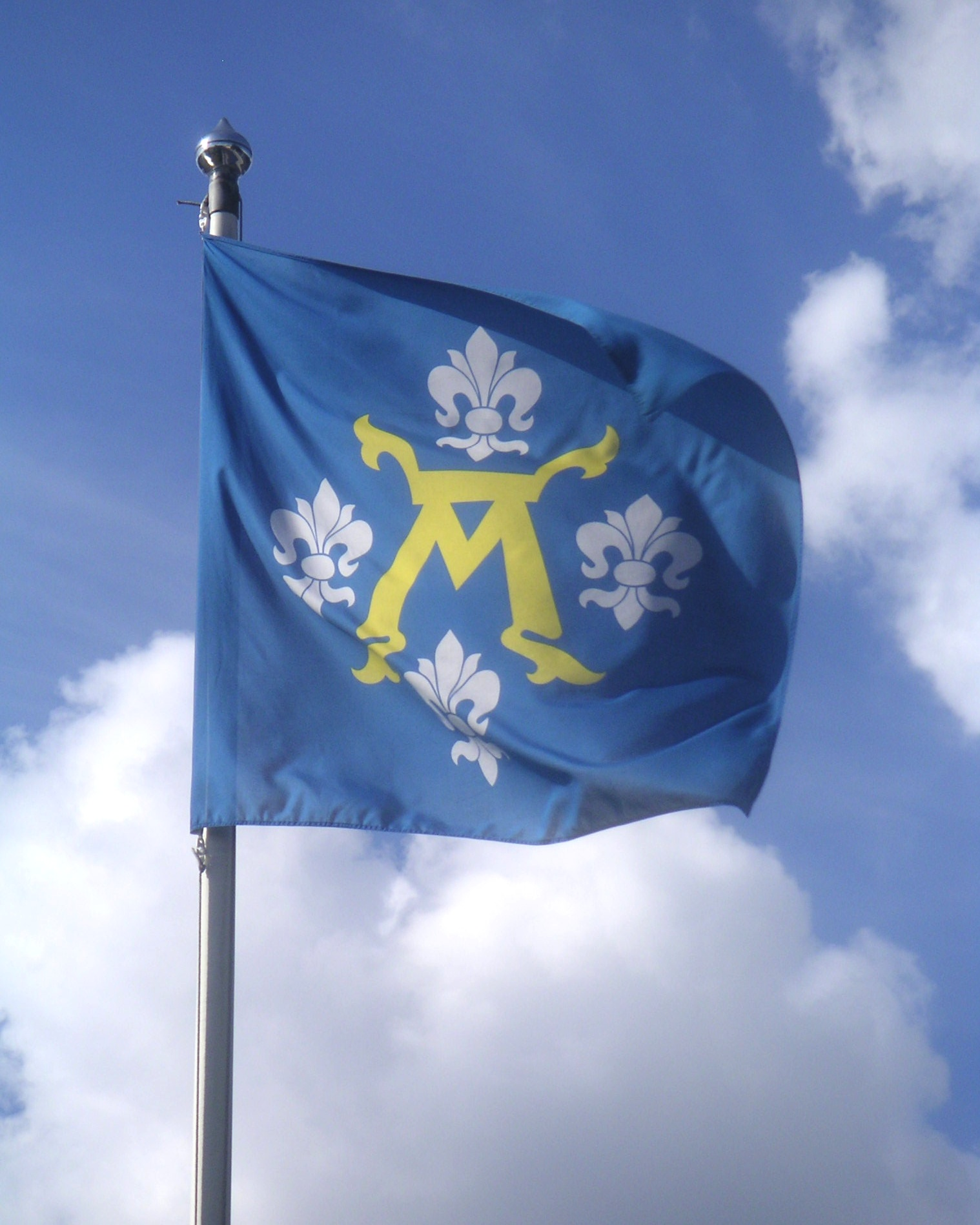
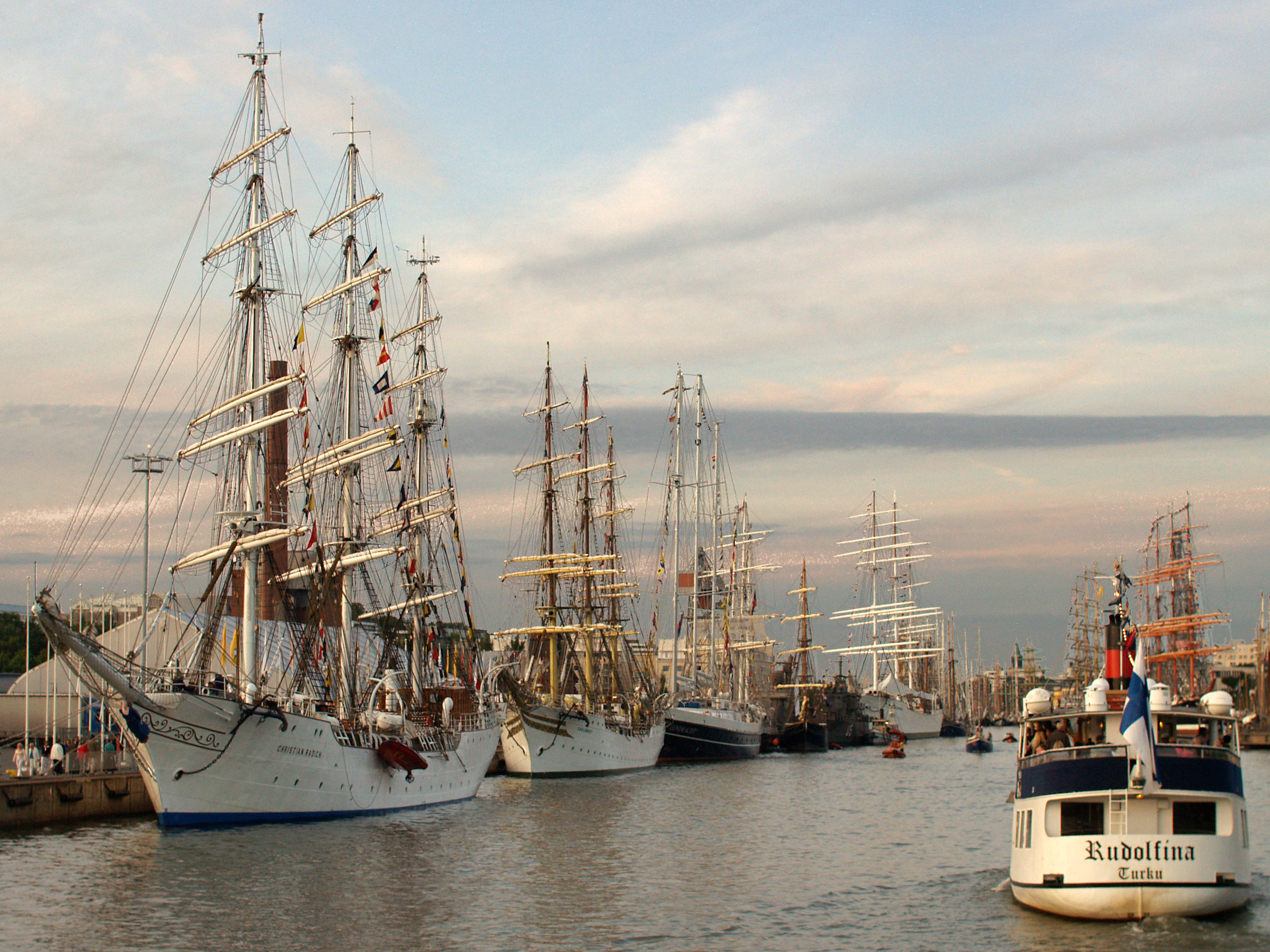
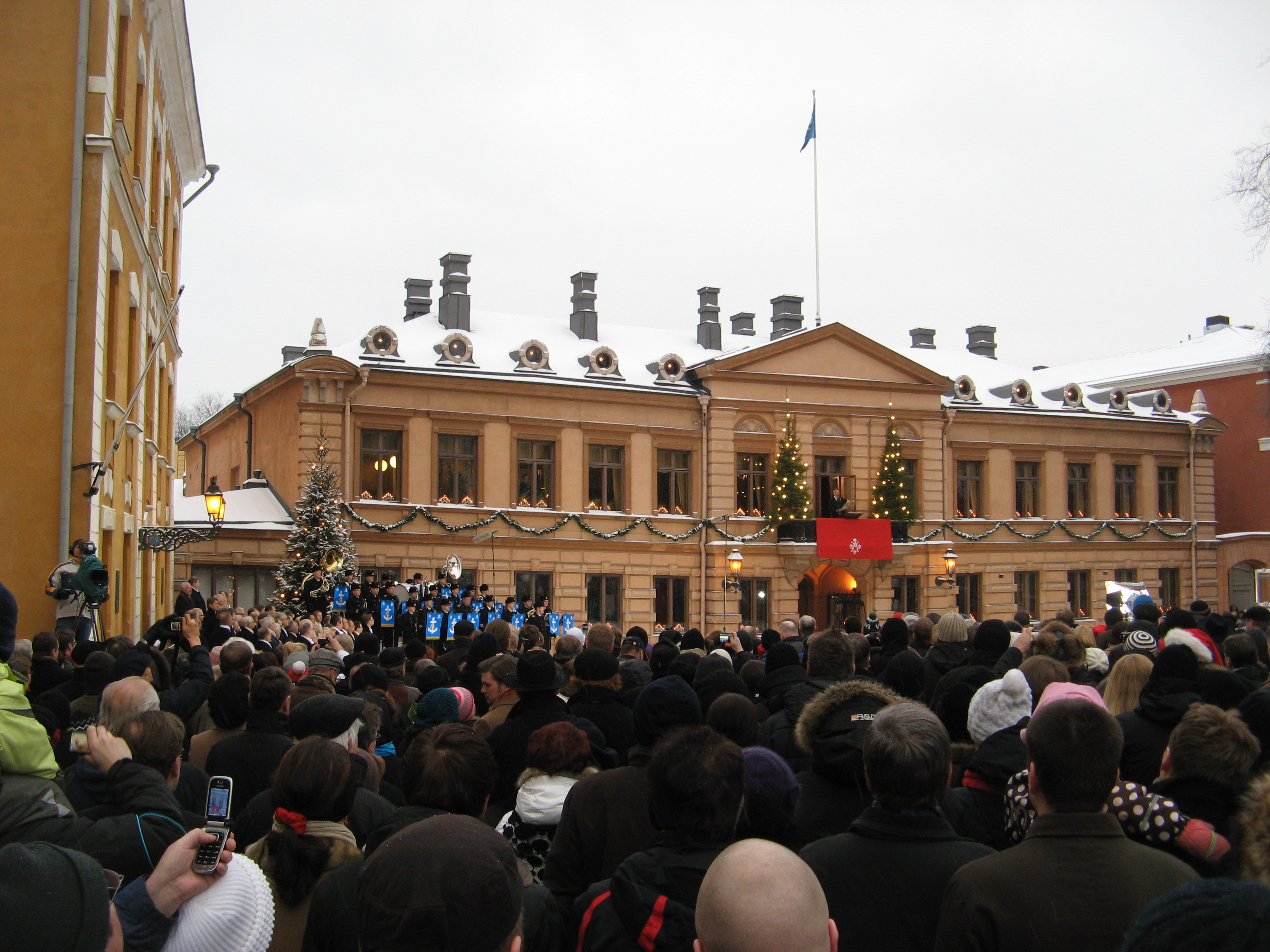
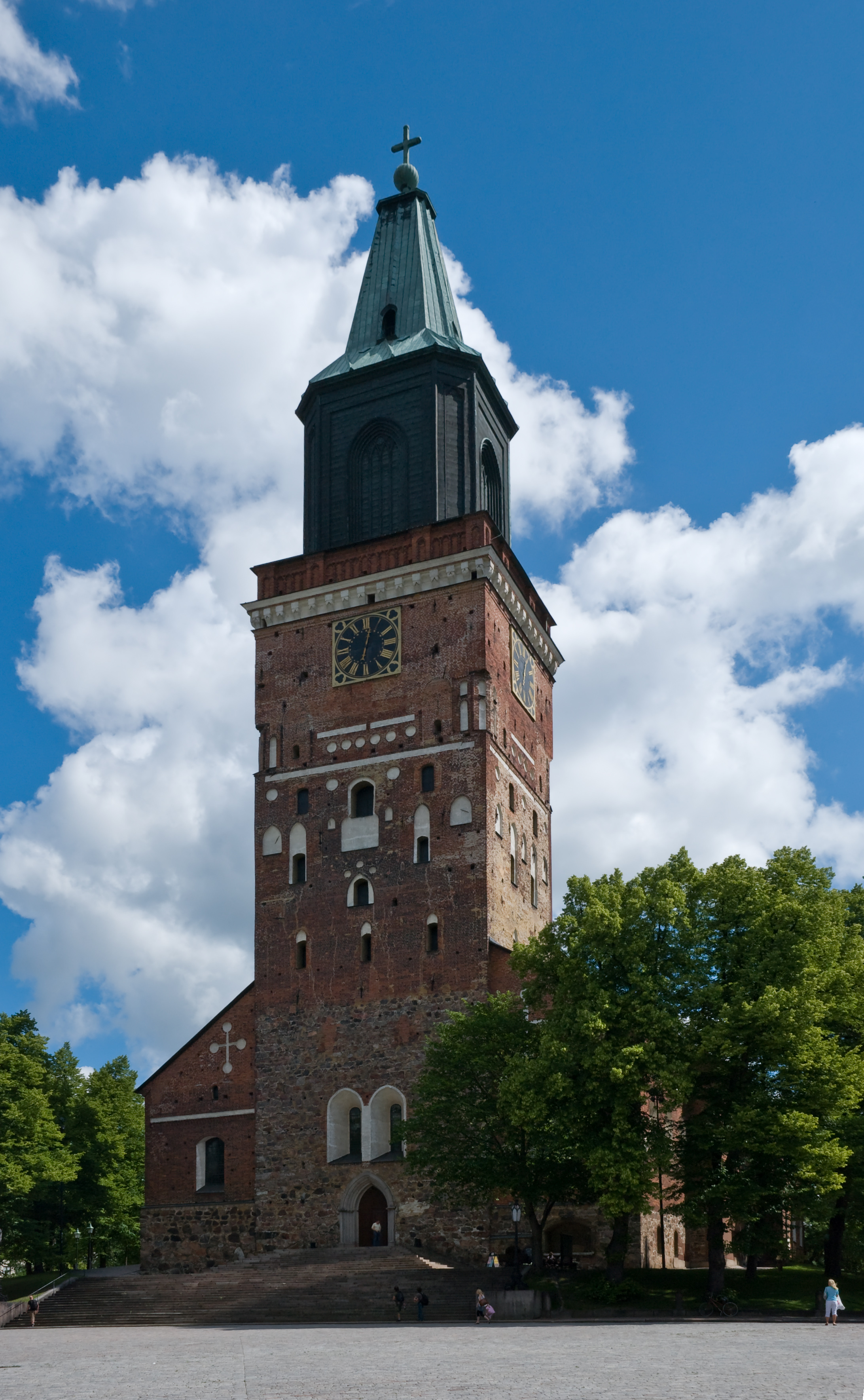
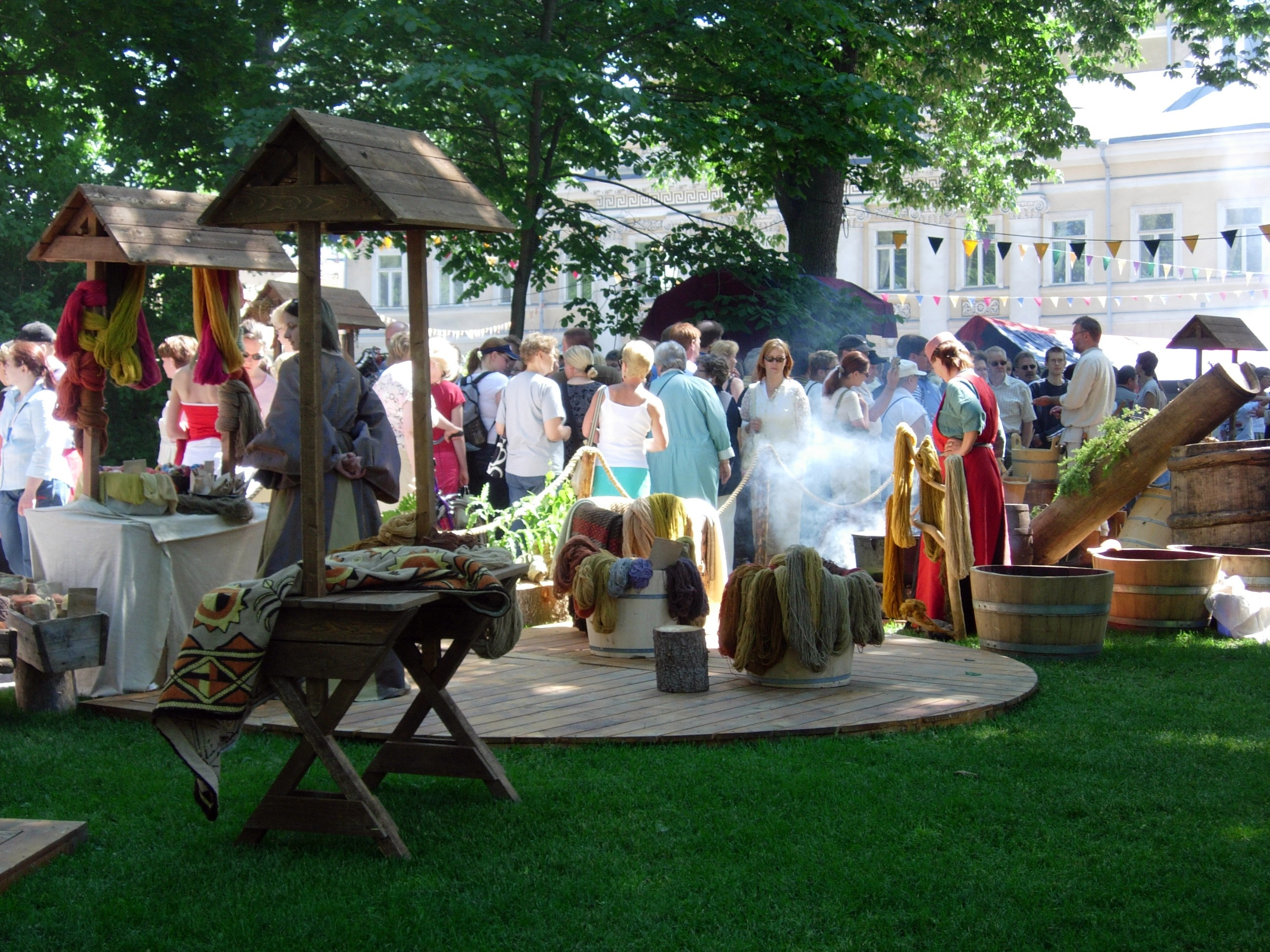
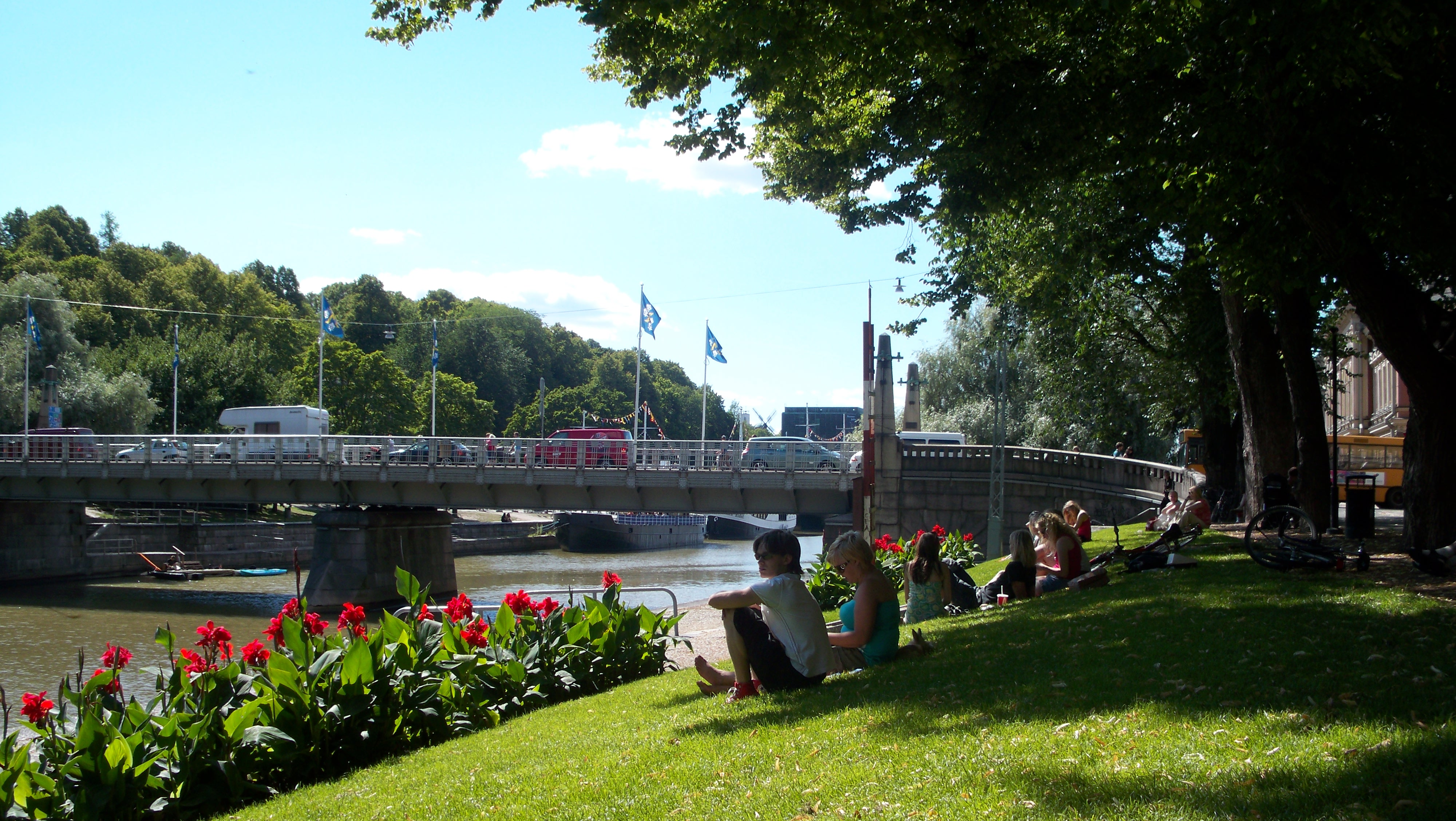
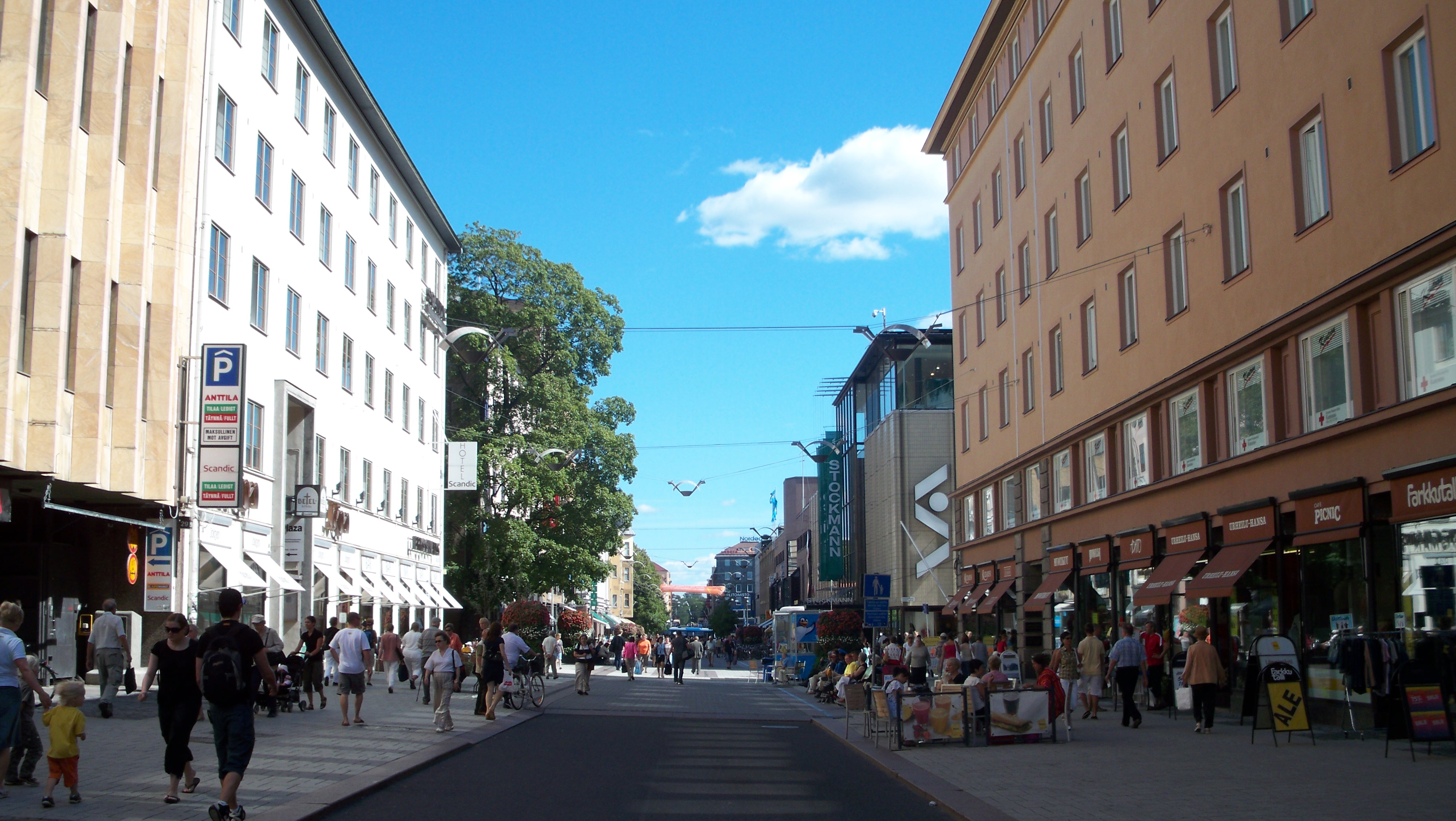
- Top row: aerial view of Turku from atop Turku Cathedral; 2nd row: Turku Castle; Flag of Turku; Tall Ships Races in Turku; 3rd row: The Christmas Peace Balcony of Turku; Turku Cathedral; Turku Medieval Market; Bottom row: summer along the Aura River; view of Yliopistonkatu pedestrian area

- Flag Coat of arms
- Nicknames: Paris of Finland, Food Capital of Finland
- Location of Turku in Finland
- Interactive map of Turku
- Coordinates: 60°27′06″N 22°16′01″E
- Country: Finland
- Region: Southwest Finland
- Sub-region: Turku sub-region
- Metropolitan area: Turku metropolitan area
- First historical record: 23 January 1229
- First possible appearance on map: 1154
- Capital city: 17 September 1809 – 8 April 1812

Government
  - Mayor: Piia Elo

Area
  - City: 306.36 km^{2} (118.29 sq mi)
  - Land: 245.63 km^{2} (94.84 sq mi)
  - Water: 60.7 km^{2} (23.4 sq mi)
  - Metro: 1,185.24 km^{2} (457.62 sq mi)
  - Rank: 247th largest in Finland

Population (2025-12-31)
  - City: 209,633
  - Rank: 6th largest in Finland
  - Density: 853.45/km^{2} (2,210.4/sq mi)
  - Metro: 319,847

Population by native language
  - Finnish: 76.7% (official)
  - Swedish: 5.4% (official)
  - Others: 17.9%

Population by age
  - 0 to 14: 12.6%
  - 15 to 64: 66.5%
  - 65 or older: 20.9%
- Time zone: UTC+02:00 (EET)
  - Summer (DST): UTC+03:00 (EEST)
- Postal code: 20000–20960
- Website: turku.fi

Turku (/ˈtʊərkuː/ TOOR-koo; Finnish: [ˈturku]; Swedish: Åbo, Finland Swedish: [ˈoːbu]) is a city in Finland and the regional capital of Southwest Finland. It is located on the southwestern coast of the country at the mouth of the River Aura. The population of Turku is approximately 210,000, while the metropolitan area has a population of around 320,000. It is the 6th–most populous municipality in Finland, and the third–most populous urban area in the country after Helsinki and Tampere.

Turku is Finland's oldest city. It is not known when Turku was granted city status. Pope Gregory IX first mentioned the town of Aboa in his Bulla in 1229, and this year is now used as the founding year of the city. Turku was the most important city in Finland under Swedish rule. After the Finnish War, Finland became an autonomous grand duchy of the Russian Empire in 1809, and Turku became the capital of the Grand Duchy. However, Turku lost its status as capital only three years later in 1812, when Emperor Alexander I of Russia decided to move the capital to Helsinki. It was only after the last great fire in 1827 that most government institutions were moved to Helsinki along with the Royal Academy of Turku, founded in 1640, which later became the University of Helsinki, thus consolidating Helsinki's position as the new capital. Turku was Finland's most populous city until the late 1840s and remains the regional capital, an important business and cultural centre, and a port.

Due to its long history, Turku has been the site of many important events and, as a former capital, has had a major influence on Finnish history. Together with Tallinn, the capital of Estonia, Turku was named European Capital of Culture for 2011. In 1996, the city of Turku was declared the "Christmas City" of Finland. Turku has also been officially declared the Food Capital of Finland, as it is home to some of Finland's oldest and highest-quality restaurants, as well as a historically famous fish market held twice a year. Turku's canteen and café culture has often been compared to French food culture, which is why Turku is sometimes known as the "Paris of Finland", and explains the existence of the Swedish saying "Varför Paris, vi har ju Åbo!" ("Why [should we concern ourselves with] Paris? We have Turku!").

Turku is a bilingual municipality with Finnish and Swedish as its official languages. The population consists of 77% Finnish speakers, 5% Swedish speakers, and 18% speakers of other languages, which is well above the national average.

Due to its location, the Port of Turku is an important commercial and passenger seaport, with over three million passengers travelling to Stockholm and Mariehamn each year.

== Names and etymology ==
The Finnish name Turku is related to the word torg, which is found in the Scandinavian and modern Russian languages and means "market". Although direct borrowing from Old Russian tŭrgŭ (търгъ) is often assumed, it is more likely that the word spread through Varangian trade networks than through the presence of Russian merchants in Finland. According to linguist Kaisa Häkkinen, the word likely entered Finnish via Estonian, where turg still retains the meaning "market". Over time, the original meaning faded in Finnish, and by the Middle Ages, turku had become synonymous with the town's name. Today the word survives primarily in idiomatic expressions.

For the Swedish name, the most widely accepted interpretation holds that Åbo is a simple combination of å ("river, creek, large stream") and bo ("dwelling, settlement"), referring to a settlement by the Aura River. Nevertheless, several alternative interpretations have been proposed. One suggests that the name derives from the personal name Abraham, possibly in a shortened form such as Abo. Another theory considers Åbo a reinterpretation or translation of the Finnish name Turku. A third possibility links the name to monastic naming traditions, particularly the Dominican monastery at Åhus in Skåne, which may have served as a model when the Dominican order established a monastery in the area during the 13th century. Linguist Mikko Heikkilä has also proposed that Åbo developed from an earlier, unattested form Aborg, which would have originally referred to the Vanhalinna hillfort in nearby Lieto.

In Finnish, the genitive of Turku is Turun, meaning "of Turku". The Finnish names of organizations and institutes of Turku often begin with this word, as in Turun yliopisto for the University of Turku.

== History ==
Turku has a long history as Finland's largest city and occasionally as the administrative center of the country, but for the last two hundred years has been surpassed by Helsinki. The city's identity stems from its status as the oldest city in Finland and the country's first capital. Originally, the word "Finland" referred only to the area around Turku (hence the title, "Finland Proper" for the region).

=== Early history ===
Settlement in the Turku area is relatively recent, for southwestern Finland remained below sea level for an extended period due to the Ice Age. Due to tectonic uplift, the Turku region transformed from an outlying archipelago to a shoreline during 3000-2000 BCE. The area was densely populated during the Iron Age as it was the most important agricultural region in the region. Ancient cemeteries dating from 550 to 1150 have been discovered in the region. Some cemeteries were utilized during the initial migratory phase, while some were solely utilized during the Viking Age, and others were established in the 12th century. There are also remains of houses and villages and old forts from the late Iron Age.

According to legend, the English bishop Henry baptised the first Finns into Christianity in 1150. However, the first Christian graves date from the 10th and 11th centuries, and the first archaeological evidence of a church dates from the 12th century. In the 11th century, the Turku region began to develop as a port. The oldest known road, Hämeen härkätie, connected to region and the Old Castle of Lieto to Tavastia in the 9th century at the latest. Early literary sources such as Al-Idrisi's world map from 1154 mention Turku.

=== Swedish era ===
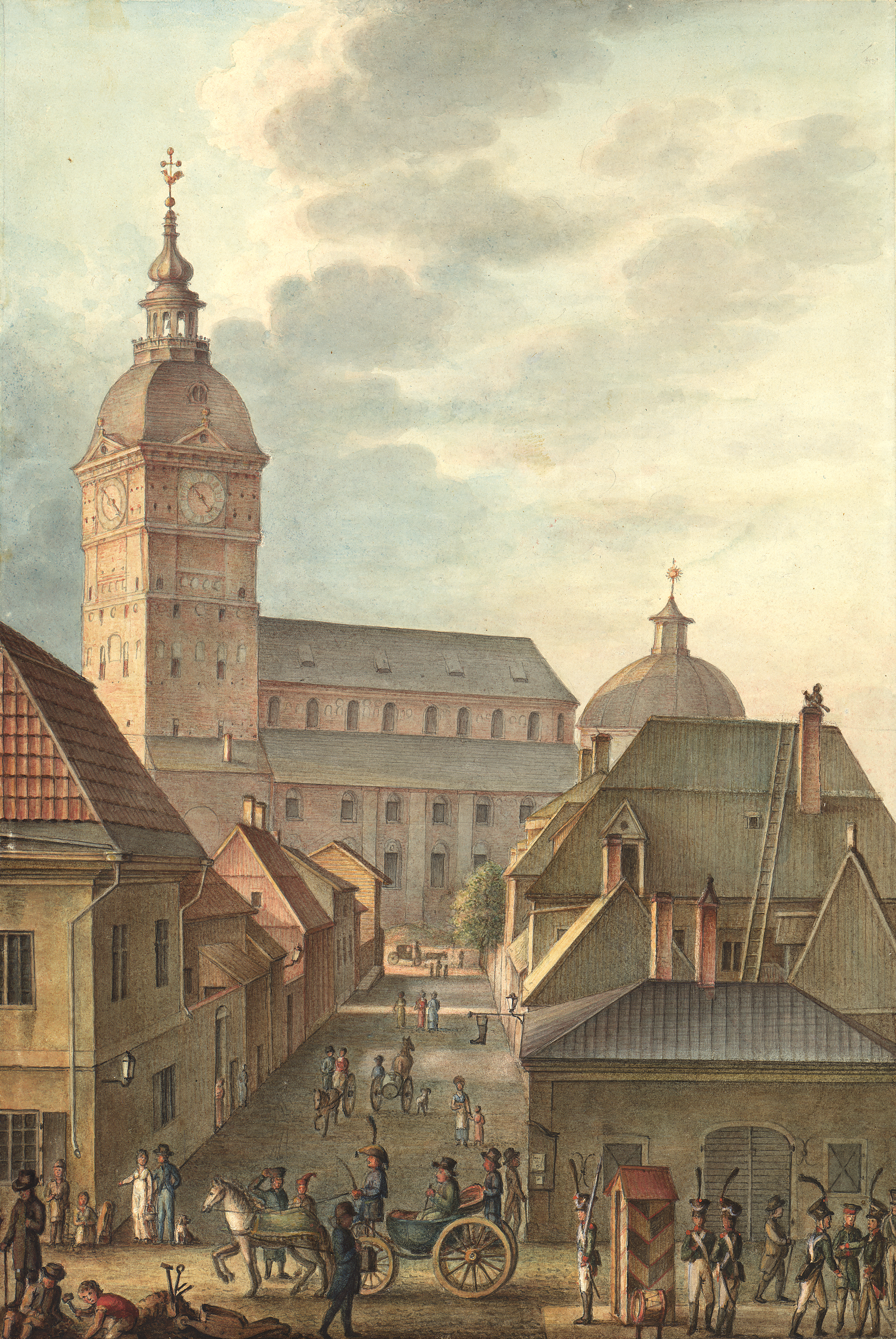
Turku Cathedral in 1814, prior to the Great Fire in 1827

According to the permission granted by Pope Gregory IX on 23 January 1229, the episcopal seat was moved from Nousiainen to Koroinen, which is located near the current center of Turku. There is nothing to suggest that the actual city of Turku still existed at this point; however, the city was not founded on uninhabited land, but there were fields and probably also a peasant village. Since no reliable document has survived about the year of the city's founding, it has also been speculated that the city was founded in the 1280s or 1290s by the joint initiative of the king, the bishop, and the Dominican Convent of Saint Olaf, which itself was founded in 1249.

Turku Cathedral was consecrated in 1300. During the Middle Ages, Turku was the seat of the Bishop of Turku (a title later upgraded to Archbishop of Turku), covering then the eastern half of the Kingdom of Sweden (most of the present-day Finland) until the 17th century. Even if Turku had no official capital status, it was for a long time the most important city in Finland as part of the trade and shipping of the Hanseatic League. In the 14th century, two-thirds of the city's burghers were German, but gradually the proportion of domestic burghers increased. In addition to the ecclesiastical authority, the only lawspeakers in Finland operated in Turku, and from the 15th century to the 16th century, the court exercising the country's highest judicial power, the Land Court of Turku, met in the city.

At the beginning of the 16th century, in connection with the disputes of the Kalmar Union, the Danes destroyed the city twice, in 1509 under the leadership of Admiral Otte Rud and in 1522 under the leadership of Admiral Søren Norby, until Erik Fleming's troops expelled the Danes from Finland in 1523. After the beginning of peace, Gustav Vasa, who had just become king, thoroughly got to know different parts of his kingdom, the center of the king's first visit to Finland being Turku Castle, where he lived during his visit. The new king also brought with him the religious reformation, and the first to preach the new doctrine was Petrus Särkilahti. Särkilahti's student Mikael Agricola, who is known as the "father of Finnish literary language", continued the religious reform first as the headmaster of the cathedral school and later as the Bishop of Turku. Duke John (later John III), the son of Gustav Vasa, received the title of Duke of Finland and ruled his territory from Turku Castle before becoming next king of Sweden after his brother, Eric XIV.

In the aftermath of the War against Sigismund, the city was the site of the Åbo Bloodbath. After that, the 17th century began as more peaceful period for Turku, when the focus was mainly on emphasizing Turku's position as the center of a wide area by establishing numerous new administrative and school institutions. In 1640, the first university in Finland, the Royal Academy of Turku, was founded in Turku by order of Queen Christina. This project was also supported by Count Per Brahe, the Governor General of Finland, and Isaacus Rothovius, the Bishop of Turku. Turku was also the meeting place for the States of Finland in 1676.

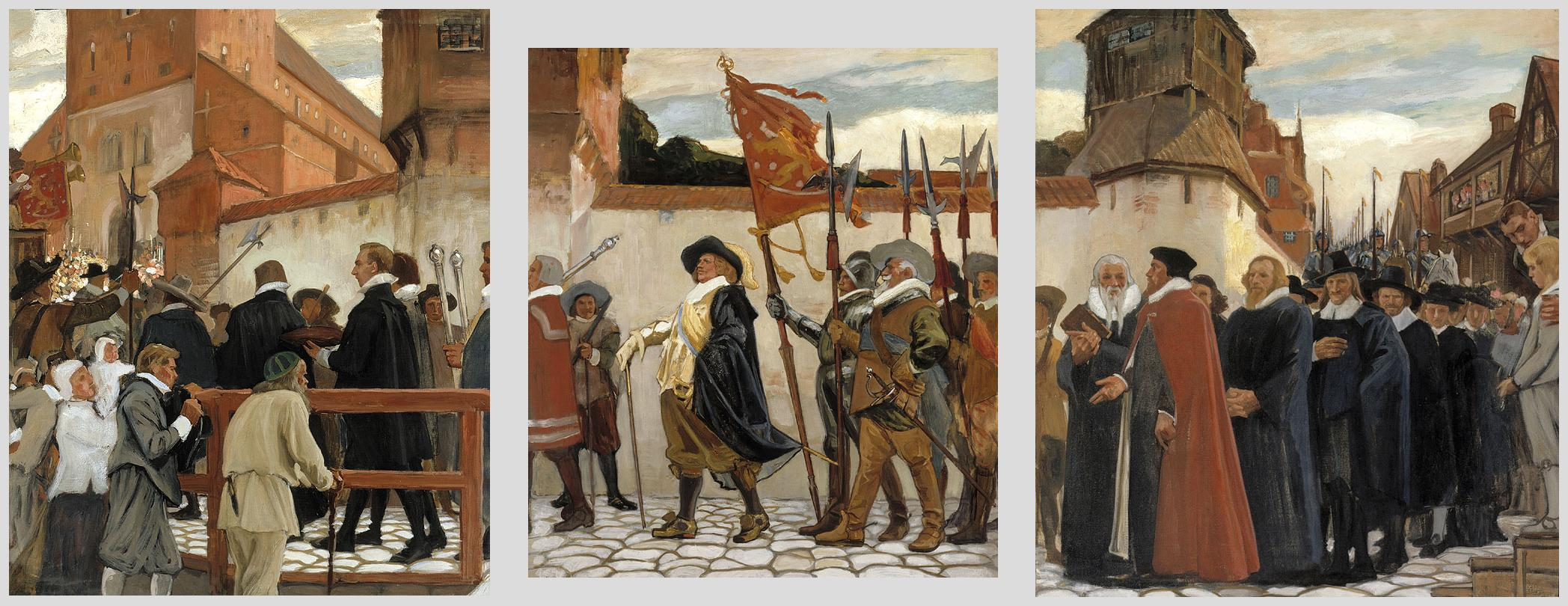
Inauguration of the Academy of Turku in 1640, by Albert Edelfelt from 1902

=== Grand Duchy of Finland (Russian rule) ===
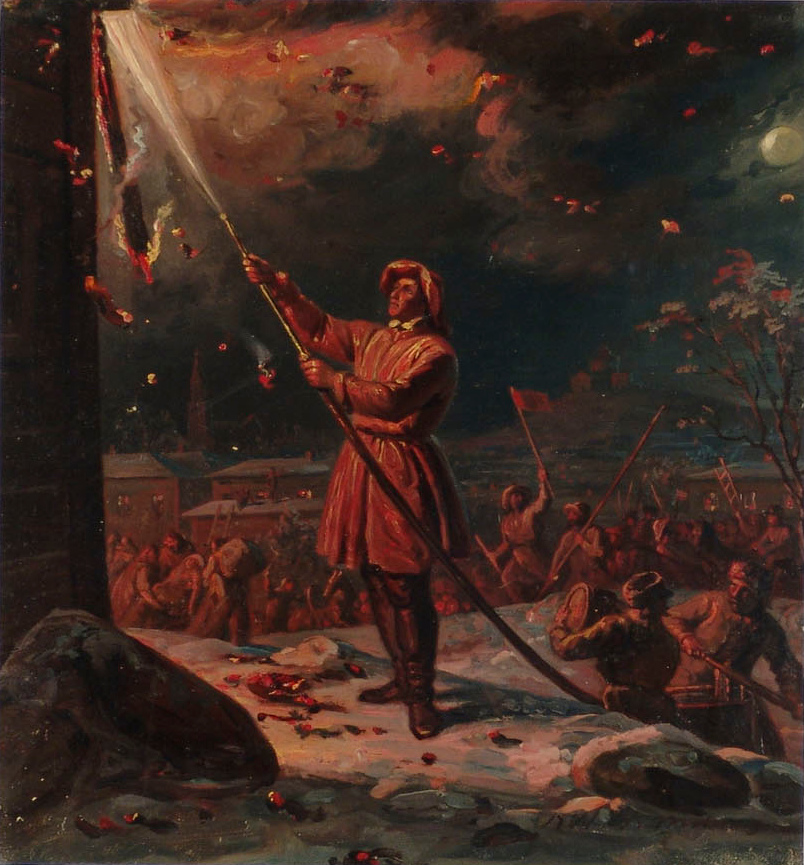
Great Fire of Turku, a painting by R. W. Ekman

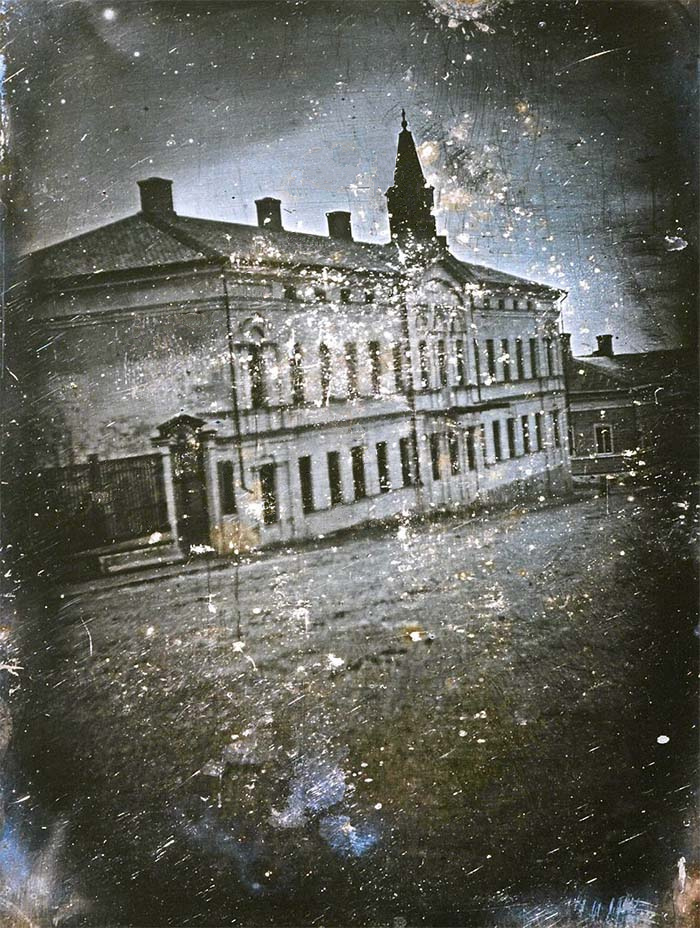
A daguerreotype photograph of the Nobel House, the first photograph taken in Finland, from 1842

After the Finnish War, Sweden ceded Finland to Imperial Russia at the Treaty of Fredrikshamn in 1809. There was no resistance of any kind in Turku when the Russians marched into the city in October 1809 in connection with the Finnish War. Despite the occupation, life in Turku continued peacefully. The Court of Appeal of Turku continued its session when the Russians arrived, and later in the spring Jacob Tengström, the Archbishop of Turku and Finland, and the teaching staff of the Turku Academy swore an oath of loyalty to their new ruler.

Turku became briefly the official capital, but soon lost the status to Helsinki, as Emperor Alexander I felt that Turku was too far from Russia and too aligned with Sweden to serve as the capital of the Grand Duchy of Finland. The change officially took place in 1812. The government offices that remained in Turku were finally moved to the new capital after the Great Fire of Turku, which destroyed a large portion of the city in 1827. After the fire, a new and safer city plan was drawn up by German architect Carl Ludvig Engel, who had also designed the new capital, Helsinki. The new city plan, based on a regular grid plan, was more spacious and fire-safe than before, and after the reconstruction, Turku was one of the most unified architecture in Europe. Turku remained the largest city in Finland for another twenty years.

In the middle of the 19th century, Turku was, after Helsinki, the most important craft city in Finland, but the Industrial Revolution with steam and electric machines was experienced in Turku only around 1900. The First World War provided a boost to the city's industry, as the export difficulties affected the wood industry, which Turku didn't have much of, and it was easy to get much-needed raw materials from neutral Sweden.

=== After independence ===
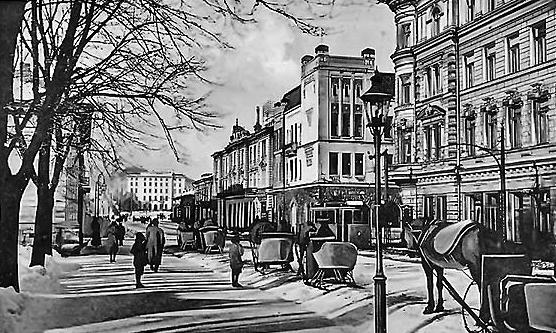
Aurakatu area in the 1910s

In 1918, a new university, the Åbo Akademi – the only Swedish-language university in Finland – was founded in Turku. Two years later, the Finnish-language University of Turku was founded alongside it. These two universities are the second and third to be founded in Finland, both by private donations.

In the 20th century, Turku was called "Finland's gateway to the West" by historians such as Jarmo Virmavirta. The city enjoyed good connections with other Western European countries and cities, especially since the 1940s with Stockholm across the Gulf of Bothnia. In the 1960s, Turku became the first Western city to sign a twinning agreement with Leningrad in the Soviet Union, leading to greater inter-cultural exchange and providing a new meaning to the city's 'gateway' function. After the fall of communism in Russia, many prominent Soviets came to Turku to study Western business practices, among them Vladimir Putin, then Leningrad's deputy mayor.

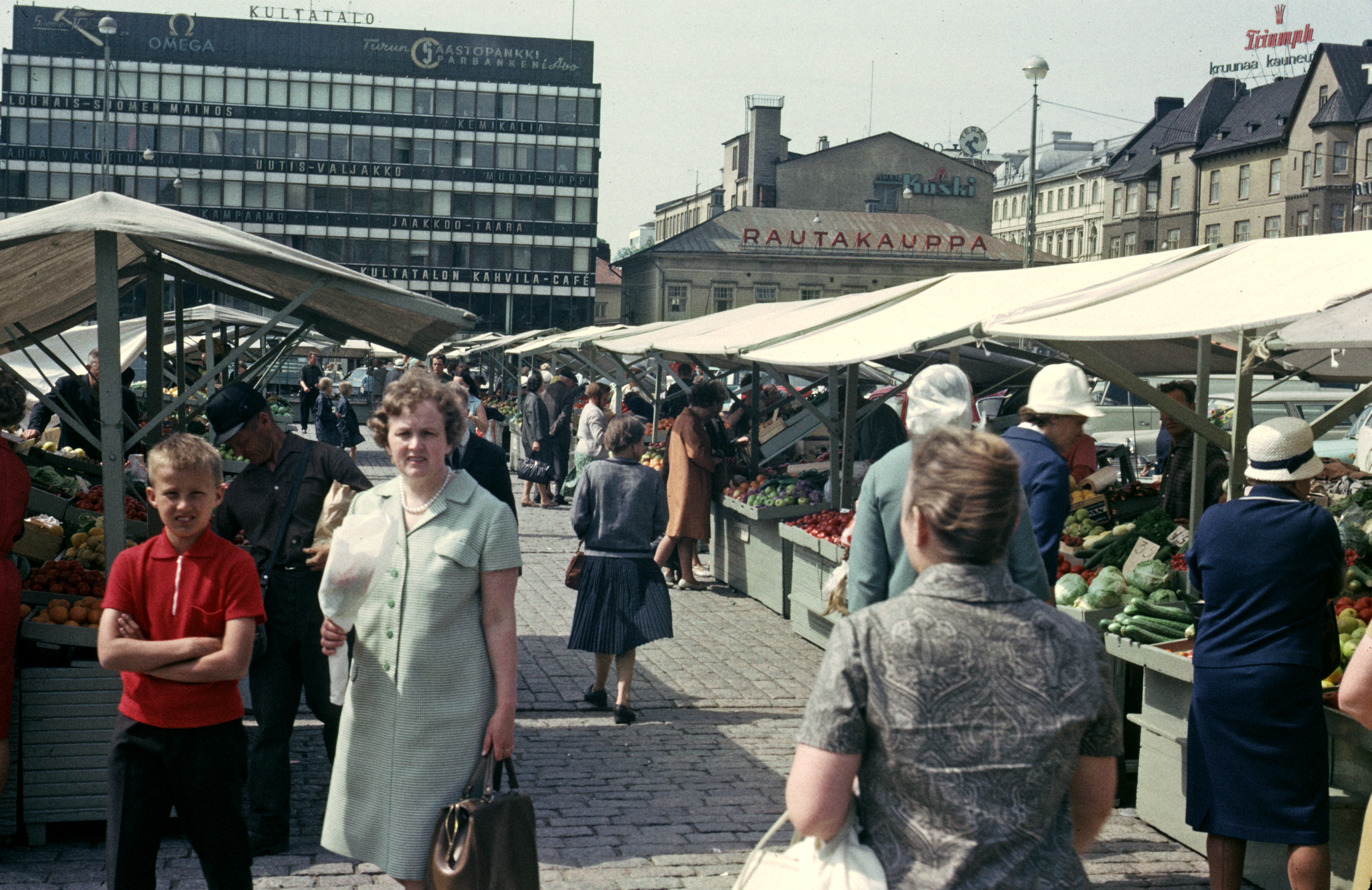
The Market Square in 1965

As for architecture in the city, both the body of architectural styles as well as the prevalent way of living have experienced significant changes in the 20th century. While having survived relatively intact throughout the years of war 1939–1945, the city faced increasing changes in the 1950s and 1960s due to rising demands for apartments, the eagerness to rebuild, and most of all the new development of infrastructure (especially increased automobile traffic). The wooden one- to two-story houses that were the dominant mode of building in the city were mostly demolished in the 1950s and 1960s to both enable more efficient building and to ease vehicle traffic. This resulted in the destruction of buildings that were, in later decades, seen as beautiful and worth saving. (Note: The phenomenon is known as the "disease of Turku".) Some individual buildings remain controversial to this day when it comes to their demolition in the decades after the war. For example, the building of Hotel Phoenix that stood on corner of the Market Square was torn down to make way for a large, multistory apartment building in 1959. The building was significant both for its location and history: having stood on one of the most valuable lots in the city center since 1878, the building had, for example, served as the first main building of the University of Turku. Other buildings whose demolition was seen as scandalous, either already at the time of action or proved to be so in later years, include The Nobel House (subject of the very first photograph ever taken in Finland) and the building of Old Hotel Börs which was built in jugendstil in 1909 by Frithiof Strandell.

== Geography ==
Situated at the mouth of the Aura River in the south-western corner of Finland, Turku covers an area of 245 square kilometres (95 sq mi) on both banks of the river. The eastern side, where Turku Cathedral is located, is the older and original centre. It is popularly known as täl pual jokke ("this side of the river"). The western side, where Turku Castle is located, is the newer part. It is called tois pual jokke ("the other side of the river"). In modern times, both banks of the Aura River are equally the centre of the city.

There are twelve bridges over the Aura river in Turku. The oldest of the current bridges is Auransilta, which was constructed in 1904. The newest bridge is Kirjastosilta ('library bridge'), a pedestrian-only bridge built in 2013. The Föri, a small ferry that transports pedestrians and bicycles across the river without payment, is a well-known feature of the city.

=== Administrative subdivisions ===
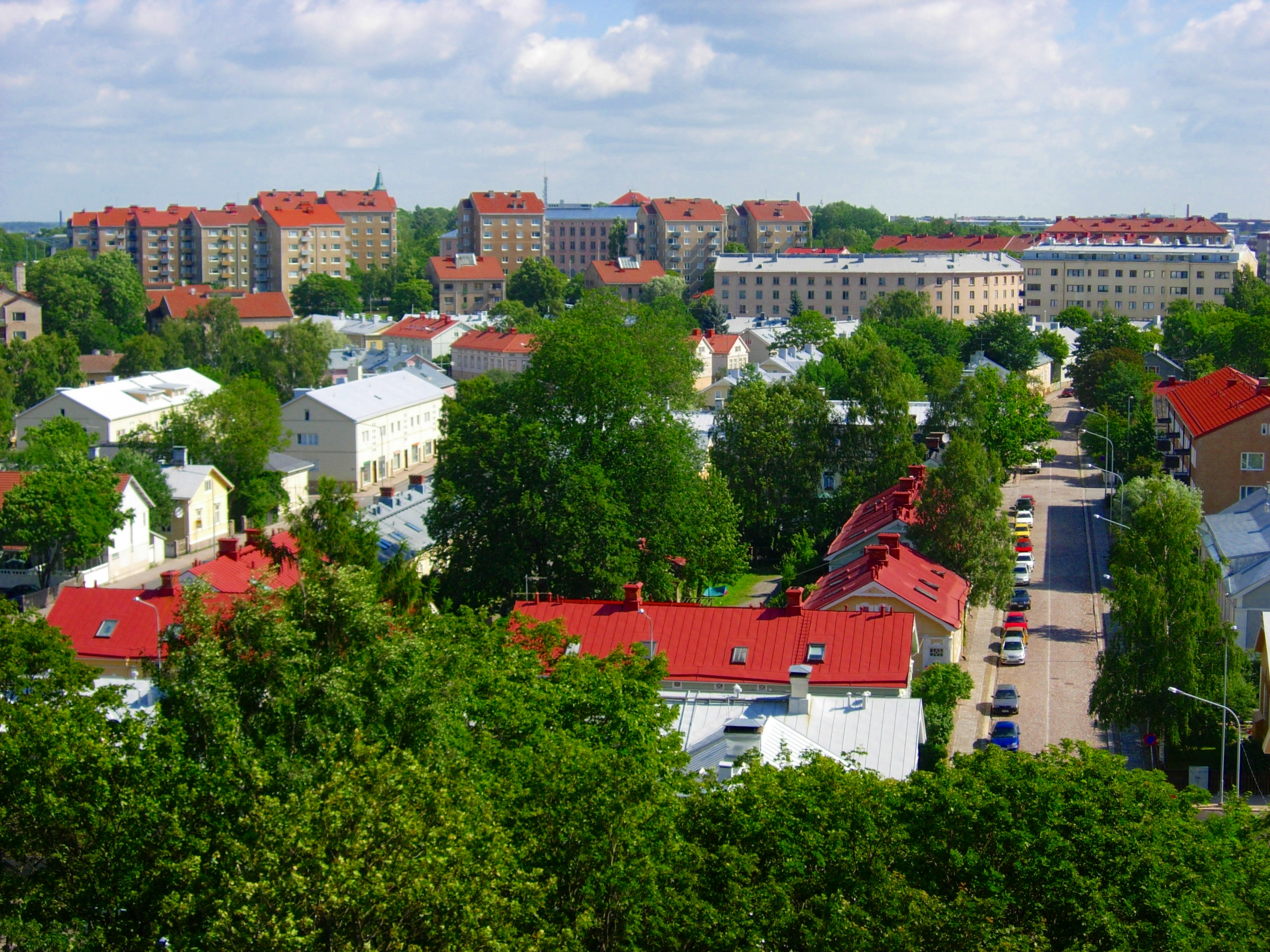
IV District, or Martti, is one of the smallest but most densely populated districts of Turku

The city is divided into 78 districts and nine wards. These do not operate as units of local government. However, some social programmes are district-based, especially in the eastern part of the city, where unemployment is high in some areas. The largest populated districts are Varissuo and Runosmäki. By area, Kakskerta and Paattinen are the largest districts.

As many of the small neighbouring municipalities from the north and south of the city were annexed during the mid-20th century, Turku is today shaped like an elongated pear. The city centre and most of the suburban areas lie in the middle, separated from the less densely populated northern rural areas by the Turku bypass, that forms part of European route E18. Islands such as Ruissalo, Hirvensalo, Satava and Kakskerta, forming the southern part of the city, are also sparsely populated and mostly contain summer residences, with the exception of some districts in Hirvensalo which are currently growing into upper-middle-class suburbs.

=== Climate ===
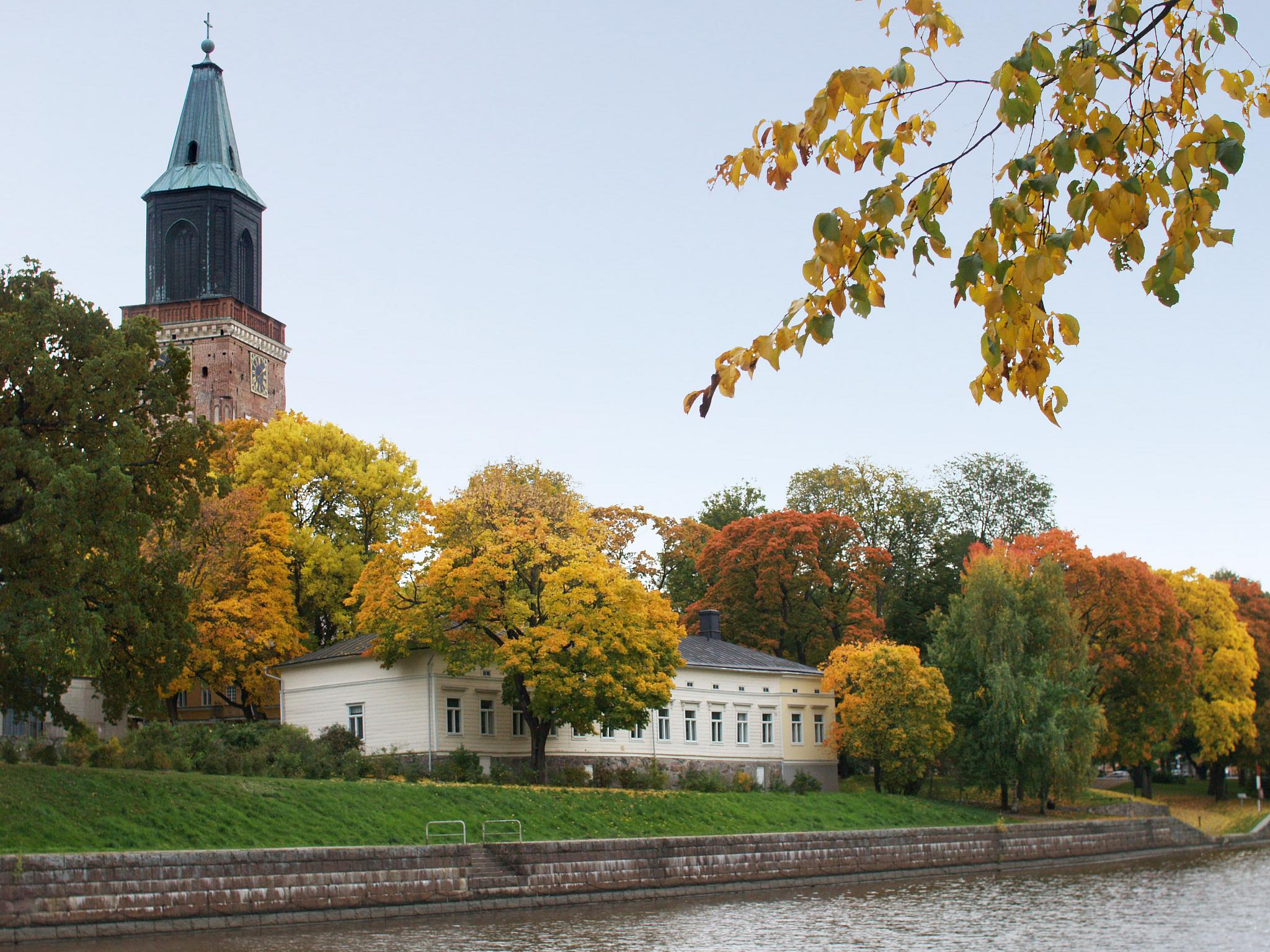
Area of Turku cathedral in autumn

Situated by the Baltic Sea and sheltered by the islands of the Archipelago Sea, Turku has a humid continental climate (Köppen Dfb). Like much of southern Finland, the city experiences warm summers, with temperatures ranging up to 30 °C (86 °F), and relatively cold winters with frequent snowfall. The warmest month of the year is July, with an average temperature of 17.5 °C (64 °F), whereas the coldest month is February. The average year-round temperature is around 6.0 °C (43 °F). Winter usually starts in early December, and spring in late March.

Precipitation in Turku averages 720 mm (28.3 in) a year. The rainiest month of the year is August, when the city receives on average 80 mm (3.1 in) of rainfall. In April, the driest month of the year, the figure is only 32 mm (1.3 in). The average air pressure at sea level is 101.2 kilopascals (29.9 inHg), with little variance throughout the year.

Operational since 1955, the city's weather station is located at an altitude of 47 metres (154 feet) at Turku Airport. The weather in the city itself is affected by the proximity of the sea, so the wintertime temperatures are often milder than those measured at the airport. The moderating impact of the sea helps oak, maple and ash trees, which are quite rare elsewhere in Finland, to thrive by the areas along the shoreline and in the archipelago.

Climate data for Turku Airport (elevation 47 m) 1991–2020 normals, extremes 1900–present
Month	Jan	Feb	Mar	Apr	May	Jun	Jul	Aug	Sep	Oct	Nov	Dec	Year
Record high °C (°F)	8.5 (47.3)	10.2 (50.4)	15.8 (60.4)	24.5 (76.1)	30.0 (86.0)	32.0 (89.6)	35.9 (96.6)	33.0 (91.4)	28.0 (82.4)	18.9 (66.0)	14.0 (57.2)	10.0 (50.0)	35.9 (96.6)
Mean maximum °C (°F)	4.8 (40.6)	4.3 (39.7)	8.9 (48.0)	18.3 (64.9)	23.8 (74.8)	26.2 (79.2)	28.8 (83.8)	27.4 (81.3)	21.7 (71.1)	14.3 (57.7)	9.1 (48.4)	5.6 (42.1)	29.8 (85.6)
Mean daily maximum °C (°F)	−1.1 (30.0)	−1.2 (29.8)	2.6 (36.7)	9.1 (48.4)	15.5 (59.9)	19.5 (67.1)	22.6 (72.7)	21.1 (70.0)	15.7 (60.3)	8.8 (47.8)	3.6 (38.5)	0.7 (33.3)	9.7 (49.5)
Daily mean °C (°F)	−3.8 (25.2)	−4.5 (23.9)	−1.3 (29.7)	4.1 (39.4)	10.0 (50.0)	14.4 (57.9)	17.5 (63.5)	16.2 (61.2)	11.3 (52.3)	5.7 (42.3)	1.5 (34.7)	−1.5 (29.3)	5.8 (42.5)
Mean daily minimum °C (°F)	−6.5 (20.3)	−7.1 (19.2)	−4.7 (23.5)	−0.2 (31.6)	4.6 (40.3)	9.3 (48.7)	12.5 (54.5)	11.6 (52.9)	7.4 (45.3)	2.8 (37.0)	−0.9 (30.4)	−4.1 (24.6)	2.1 (35.8)
Mean minimum °C (°F)	−19.4 (−2.9)	−19.9 (−3.8)	−15.0 (5.0)	−6.2 (20.8)	−1.8 (28.8)	2.9 (37.2)	6.9 (44.4)	5.0 (41.0)	−0.6 (30.9)	−6.0 (21.2)	−10.9 (12.4)	−15.3 (4.5)	−22.7 (−8.9)
Record low °C (°F)	−35.5 (−31.9)	−35.2 (−31.4)	−32.8 (−27.0)	−21.0 (−5.8)	−6.6 (20.1)	−2.2 (28.0)	1.8 (35.2)	0.2 (32.4)	−6.9 (19.6)	−15.0 (5.0)	−22.3 (−8.1)	−33.8 (−28.8)	−35.5 (−31.9)
Average precipitation mm (inches)	58 (2.3)	42 (1.7)	39 (1.5)	32 (1.3)	35 (1.4)	55 (2.2)	74 (2.9)	73 (2.9)	59 (2.3)	73 (2.9)	71 (2.8)	73 (2.9)	684 (27.1)
Average precipitation days (≥ 1.0 mm)	11	9	8	7	7	8	8	10	9	11	13	12	113
Mean monthly sunshine hours	40	75	134	204	284	276	287	230	155	89	38	27	1,839
Source 1: Climatological statistics for the normal period 1991–2020
Source 2: Record highs and lows

Climate data for Turku Artukainen (elevation 8 m) averages and records 2003–2023, precipitation 2003–2005 Turku Airport, since 2006 Artukainen, sunshine 1991–2020
Month	Jan	Feb	Mar	Apr	May	Jun	Jul	Aug	Sep	Oct	Nov	Dec	Year
Record high °C (°F)	9.2 (48.6)	9.4 (48.9)	15.0 (59.0)	23.9 (75.0)	29.4 (84.9)	31.6 (88.9)	33.6 (92.5)	33.0 (91.4)	27.5 (81.5)	17.5 (63.5)	14.1 (57.4)	10.6 (51.1)	33.6 (92.5)
Mean maximum °C (°F)	5.3 (41.5)	4.7 (40.5)	11.0 (51.8)	17.5 (63.5)	25.2 (77.4)	26.5 (79.7)	28.7 (83.7)	27.1 (80.8)	21.5 (70.7)	14.9 (58.8)	10.0 (50.0)	6.7 (44.1)	28.7 (83.7)
Mean daily maximum °C (°F)	−0.8 (30.6)	−0.6 (30.9)	3.1 (37.6)	9.6 (49.3)	16.1 (61.0)	20.5 (68.9)	23.3 (73.9)	21.7 (71.1)	16.4 (61.5)	9.6 (49.3)	4.9 (40.8)	1.6 (34.9)	10.5 (50.8)
Daily mean °C (°F)	−3.5 (25.7)	−3.6 (25.5)	−0.6 (30.9)	4.8 (40.6)	10.9 (51.6)	15.5 (59.9)	18.6 (65.5)	17.3 (63.1)	12.5 (54.5)	6.6 (43.9)	2.7 (36.9)	−0.8 (30.6)	6.7 (44.1)
Mean daily minimum °C (°F)	−6.2 (20.8)	−6.5 (20.3)	−4.4 (24.1)	0.1 (32.2)	5.7 (42.3)	10.4 (50.7)	13.8 (56.8)	12.9 (55.2)	8.6 (47.5)	3.5 (38.3)	0.5 (32.9)	−3.3 (26.1)	2.9 (37.3)
Mean minimum °C (°F)	−18.3 (−0.9)	−15.2 (4.6)	−13.6 (7.5)	−6.2 (20.8)	−1.7 (28.9)	4.1 (39.4)	8.5 (47.3)	6.6 (43.9)	1.3 (34.3)	−4.5 (23.9)	−7.5 (18.5)	−12.8 (9.0)	−18.3 (−0.9)
Record low °C (°F)	−25.4 (−13.7)	−25.4 (−13.7)	−20.4 (−4.7)	−9.9 (14.2)	−3.7 (25.3)	−0.3 (31.5)	4.5 (40.1)	3.3 (37.9)	−1.3 (29.7)	−12.6 (9.3)	−18.6 (−1.5)	−23.4 (−10.1)	−25.4 (−13.7)
Average precipitation mm (inches)	55 (2.2)	38 (1.5)	31 (1.2)	30 (1.2)	39 (1.5)	45 (1.8)	70 (2.8)	84 (3.3)	55 (2.2)	71 (2.8)	70 (2.8)	76 (3.0)	664 (26.3)
Average rainy days (≥ 1 mm)	11	8	8	7	7	8	9	11	9	12	12	13	115
Mean monthly sunshine hours	40	67	141	205	284	283	293	239	163	88	34	24	1,861
Source 1: Finnish Meteorological Institute
Source 2: https://www.ilmatieteenlaitos.fi/1991-2020-auringonpaiste-ja-sateilytilastot

== Demographics ==
=== Population ===
Historical population
Year	Pop.	±% p.a.
1815	12,550	—
1850	17,178	+0.90%
1870	19,617	+0.67%
1890	30,096	+2.16%
1900	31,658	+0.51%
1910	41,993	+2.87%
1920	45,408	+0.78%
1930	53,681	+1.69%
1940	65,475	+2.01%
1972	160,067	+2.83%
1980	163,680	+0.28%
1990	159,180	−0.28%
2000	172,561	+0.81%
2010	177,326	+0.27%
2020	194,391	+0.92%
Source: Tilastollinen päätoimisto, Statistics Finland (1972-2020)

The city of Turku has 209,633 inhabitants, making it the 6th most populous municipality in Finland. The Turku metropolitan area has a population of 319,847, and the larger Turku sub-region has a population of 355,791. This makes it the third-largest region in Finland after Helsinki and Tampere. Turku is home to 4% of Finland's population. 17 per cent of the population has a foreign background, which is almost twice as high as the national average. However, it is lower than in the major Finnish cities of Helsinki, Espoo or Vantaa.

The city's population density is 794.4 inhabitants per square kilometre. The median age in the city is 42.1, lower than the national average of 43.6.

Population size 1980–2025
Year	Population
1980	163,933
1985	162,379
1990	159,180
1995	164,744
2000	172,561
2005	174,868
2010	177,326
2015	185,908
2020	194,391
2025	209,633

=== Languages ===
Population by
mother tongue (2025)
1. Finnish (76.7%)
2. Swedish (5.40%)
3. Russian (1.90%)
4. Arabic (1.80%)
5. Albanian (1.30%)
6. Ukrainian (1.20%)
7. Kurdish (1.20%)
8. Other (10.5%)

The city of Turku is officially bilingual, with both Finnish and Swedish as official languages. The majority of the population, 160,815 persons (76.7%), spoke Finnish as their first language. The number of Swedish speakers was 11,306 persons (5.4%) of the population. Foreign languages were spoken by 17.9% of the population. As English and Swedish are compulsory school subjects, functional bilingualism or trilingualism acquired through language studies is not uncommon.

More than a hundred different languages are spoken as mother tongues in Turku, and citizens from more than 130 countries live in the city. The people of Turku also represent all major religions. The most commonly spoken foreign languages are Russian (1.9%), Arabic (1.8%), Albanian (1.3%), Ukrainian (1.2%) and Kurdish (1.2%).

=== Immigration ===
Population by country of birth (2025)
Country of birth	Population	%
Finland	175,631	83.8
Soviet Union	3,624	1.7
Iraq	2,519	1.2
Iran	1,589	0.8
Vietnam	1,140	0.5
China	862	0.4
Sweden	712	0.3
Afghanistan	712	0.3
Philippines	769	0.4
India	769	0.4
Other	21,776	10.4

As of 2024, there were 35,088 people with a foreign background living in Turku, or 17% of the population. (Note: Statistics Finland classifies a person as having a "foreign background" if both parents or the only known parent were born abroad.) There were 31,223 residents who were born abroad, or 15% of the population. The number of foreign citizens in Turku was 21,665.

The relative share of immigrants in Turku's population is well above the national average. Moreover, the city's new residents are increasingly of foreign origin. This will increase the proportion of foreign residents in the coming years.

Most foreign-born citizens came from the former Soviet Union, Iraq, Estonia, Sweden, Iran, the former Yugoslavia, Ukraine and Somalia.

=== Religion ===
In 2023, the Evangelical Lutheran Church was the largest religious group with 56.3% of the population of Turku. Other religious groups accounted for 3.3% of the population. 40.4% of the population had no religious affiliation.

== Economy ==
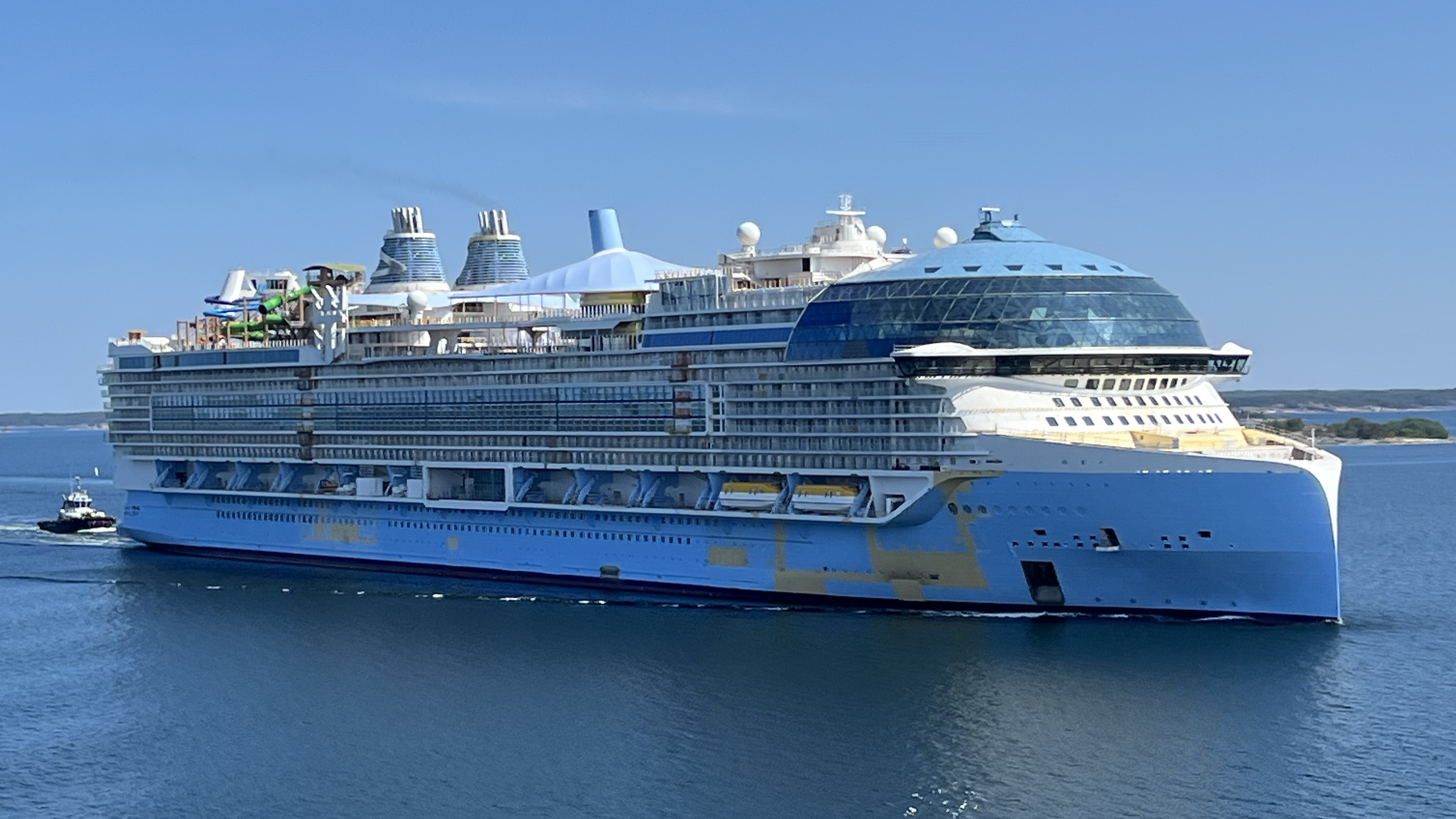
MS Icon of the Seas, the world's largest passenger ship, was built in Turku

The Turku region boasts 22,000 enterprises, two universities and four polytechnics. The city has also business branches with local expertise in the maritime, life sciences, information technology, entertainment, biotechnology, and sustainable development industries. The city's economic hub revolves around the Port of Turku and other service-oriented sectors. The dockyard of Meyer Turku and the maritime business cluster reign as the leading industrial employer in the area. The city also boasts a high-tech centre in the Turku Science Park area, with a growing role in the information technology and biotechnology industries in recent decades.

The Turku region hosts the business service centre Potkuri and the start-up community SparkUp. In addition, the West Finland Film Commission works to promote favourable operating conditions for companies in the AV industry and for the production of films and TV series in the Turku region. Turku Future Technologies is a development centre and research and innovation network supported by eight Finnish universities. Smart Chemistry Park is a collaborative platform and network for the bio- and circular economy as well as the chemical industry in Raisio. Meanwhile, Blue Industry Park is a growing cluster for maritime and manufacturing industries.

At least the following major Finnish companies have their corporate headquarters in Turku: HKScan and Hesburger. Other major companies which have operations in Turku include Bayer, Fläkt Woods, Meyer Werft, Orion Corporation and Wärtsilä.

== Culture ==
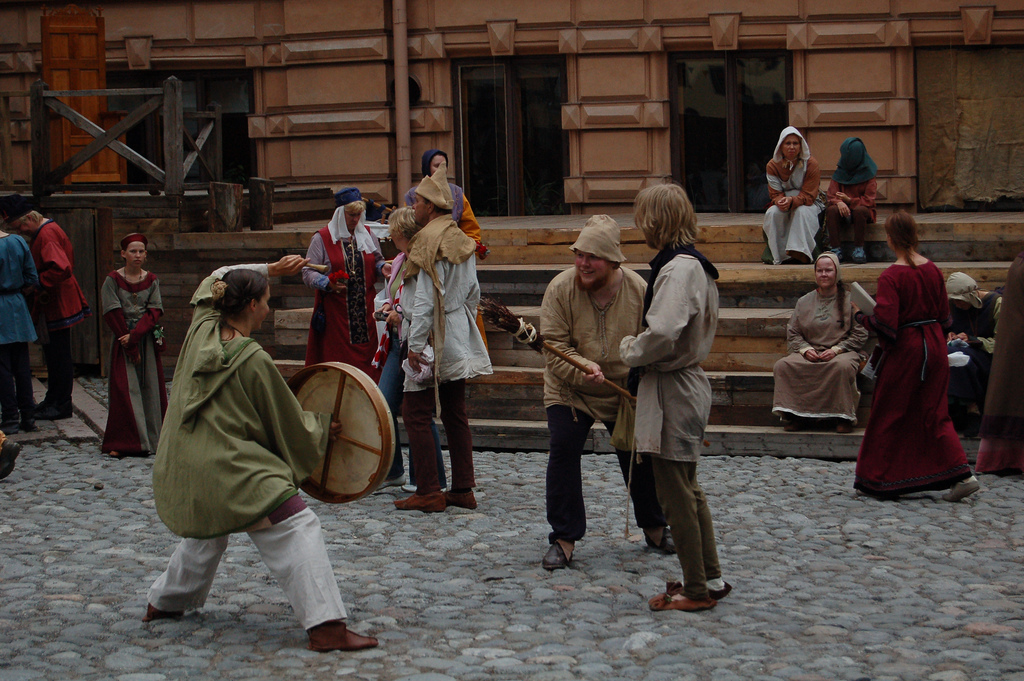
Traditional Medieval Market of Turku in summer 2006

Cultural venues in Turku include several museums, theatres, cinemas, art galleries, and music. Turku offers a variety of cultural events. The most important one is the declaration of Christmas Peace on 24 December in the Old Great Square. The tradition is about 700 years old. Other notable events include the Medieval Market, the Music Festival, the Book Fair, the Film Day, the Animated Film Festival TAFF, the Jazz Festival, the Paavo Nurmi Games of athletics, the Ruisrock rock festival, Kesärauha music festival, the Down by the Laituri music festival and the New Performance Turku Biennale.

Turku was the European Capital of Culture in 2011, and the city council has approved numerous projects to boost the city's image in preparation for that status.

=== Medieval buildings ===
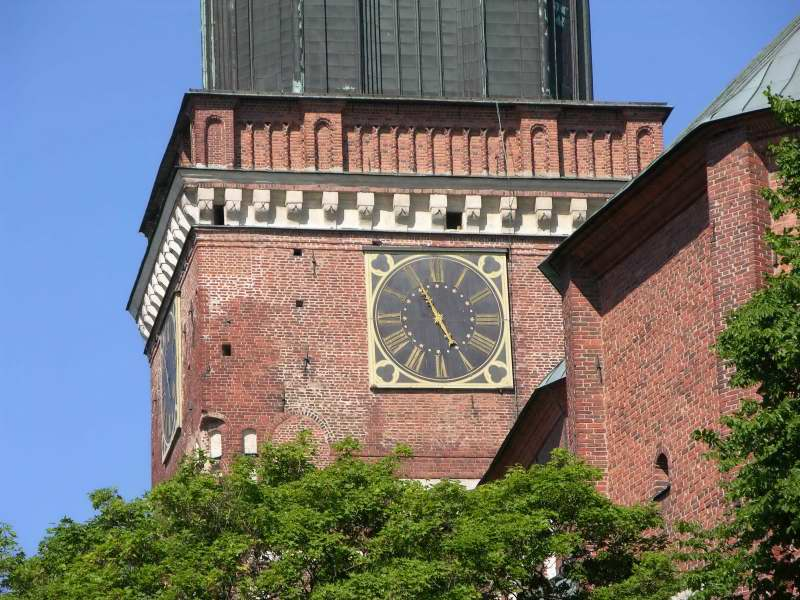
Medieval Turku Cathedral clock face

According to archaeological evidence, the construction of Turku began in the late 13th Century. However, only a few of its medieval buildings have survived to the present day. The primary factor was the Great Fire in 1827, which decimated three quarters of the city. Turku Cathedral, constructed in the 13th century, is one of the oldest still-functioning buildings. It is also Finland's only medieval basilica church. Another surviving edifice from the medieval era is Turku Castle, which was established in the 1280s and underwent several expansions in the 15th century. Only the ruins remain of the bishop's church in Koroistenniemi, Koroinen, but the white cross serves as a reminder of the bishop's castle that existed centuries ago. Qwensel House, the oldest wooden house in Turku dating back to the 18th century, has been converted into a museum. No other medieval buildings have survived to the present day.

=== Museums ===
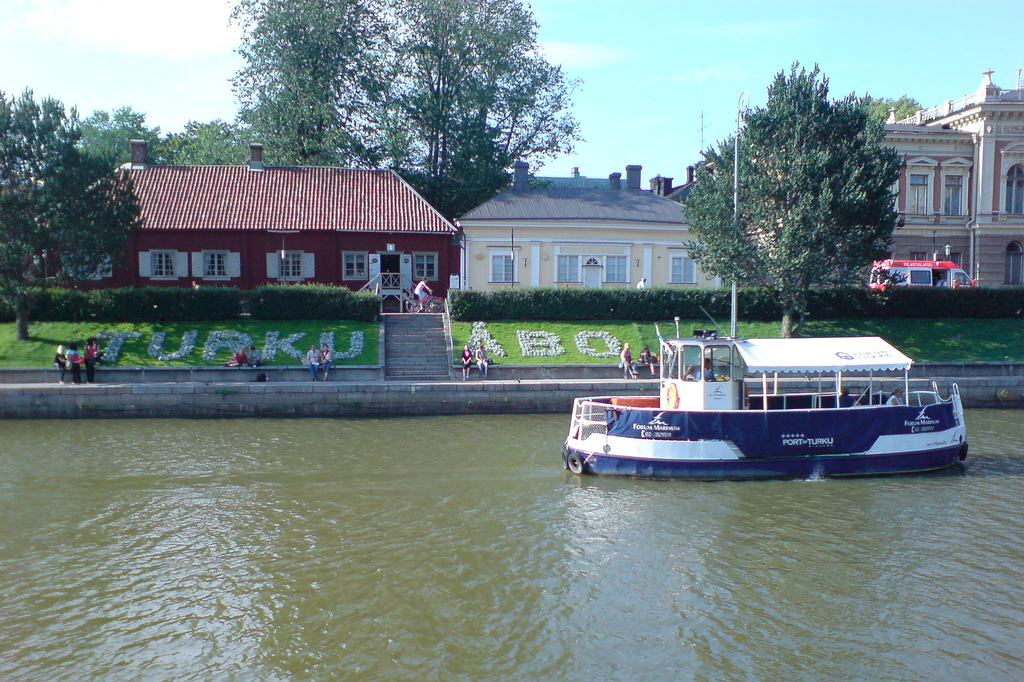
Qwensel House (left) and the old town hall. A small ferry runs in the river.

Most of Turku's museums are situated beside the Aura River. The Turku Art Museum is housed in a granite castle, with exhibits of both classical and contemporary art. Turku Cathedral and its museum, located on the banks of the Aura River, provide information about the history and artifacts of the church. Adjacent to the cathedral, Ett Hem, a 19th-century bourgeois residence, and the Sibelius Museum, which displays a collection of musical instruments, can be found. Aboa Vetus & Ars Nova presents a fusion of medieval ruins and modern art. On Vartiovuori, lies the Luostarinmäki Craftsman Museum, which represents a wooden housing locality dating back to the 18th century.

The Pharmacy Museum and Qwensel House hold the distinction of being Turku's earliest wooden abode, offering a glimpse into the bourgeois life of the 18th century and a 19th-century drugstore. The contemporary art museum, WAM, is named after Turku's sculptor, Wäinö Aaltonen. Additionally, the Biological Museum serves as a diorama museum covering Finnish wildlife and fauna. Forum Marinum is a maritime museum of exhibits and museum vessels, including the frigate Suomen Joutsen and the last commercial steam ship in Scandinavia MS Bore. Turku Castle is an attraction with over 700 years of history.

=== Theatres ===
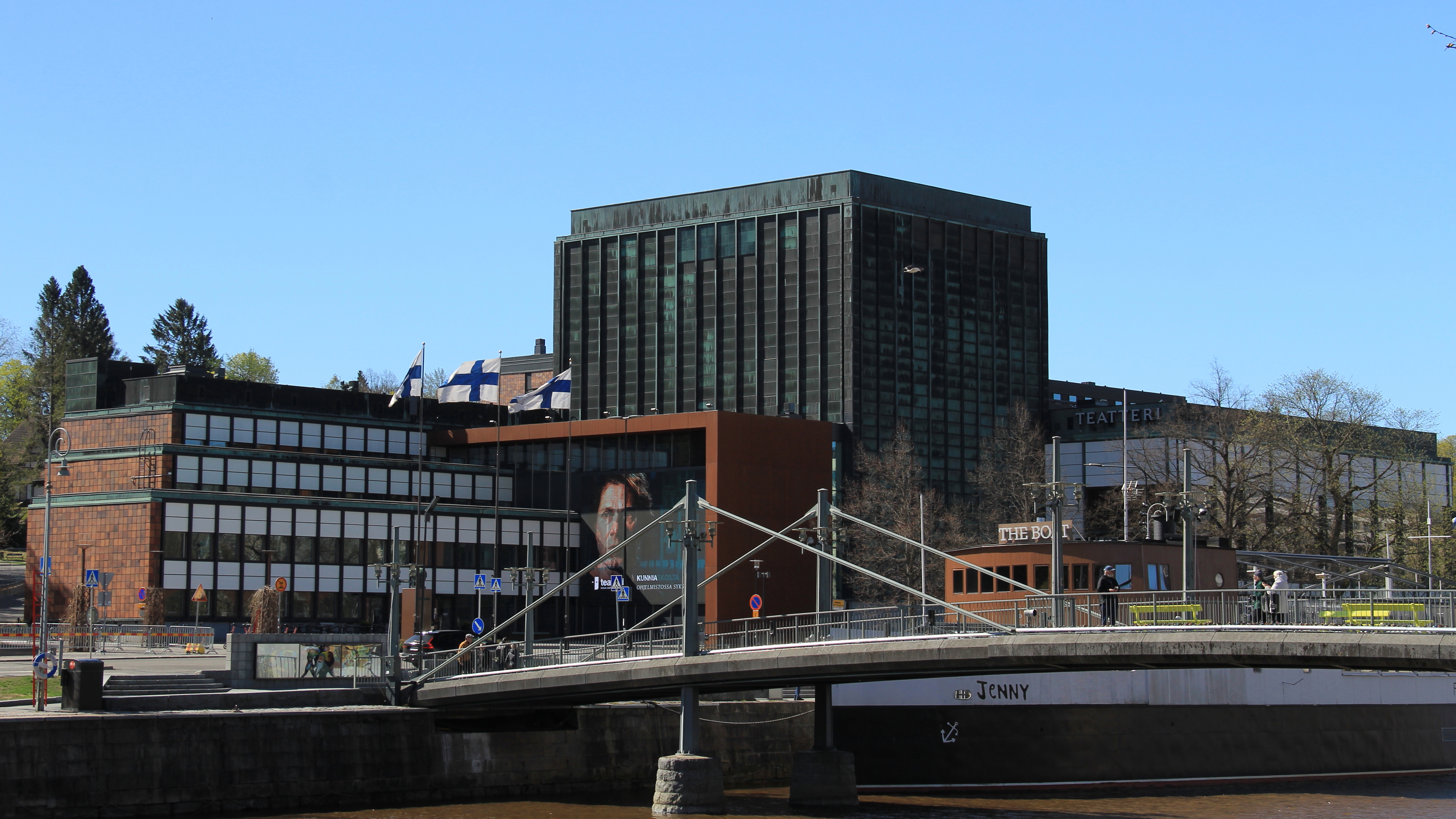
Turku City Theatre

There are half a dozen theatres situated in Turku, with the largest being the Turku City Theatre. Located in the city centre on the banks of the River Aura, it offers a varied programme of classical and contemporary drama. Other theatres in Turku include Linnateatteri, Åbo Svenska Teater, TEHDAS and Turun Nuori Teatteri, in addition to smaller establishments such as the puppet theatre, Aura of Puppets, and the summer theatres, Samppalinna and Vartiovuori.

=== Music ===
Turku is a music hub that provides a variety of musical experiences. The Turku Philharmonic Orchestra is the oldest ensemble in Finland, tracing its origins to the establishment of the Turun Soitannollinen Seura in 1790. The orchestra has a reputation for its vibrant repertoire and frequently conducts concerts throughout Finland. In October 2026, the orchestra relocated from Turku Concert Hall to the new Fuuga concert hall.

Turku boasts a selection of music festivals, catering to diverse tastes and moods. The longest running rock festival in Finland, Ruisrock, is held on the island of Ruissalo. Aura Fest is a new city-based festival, debuting in the summer of 2022. DBTL is another city festival, situated along the banks of the Aura River. Turku Jazz is an annual festival in July. August sees the Turku Music Festival, dedicated to classical music.

=== Food ===
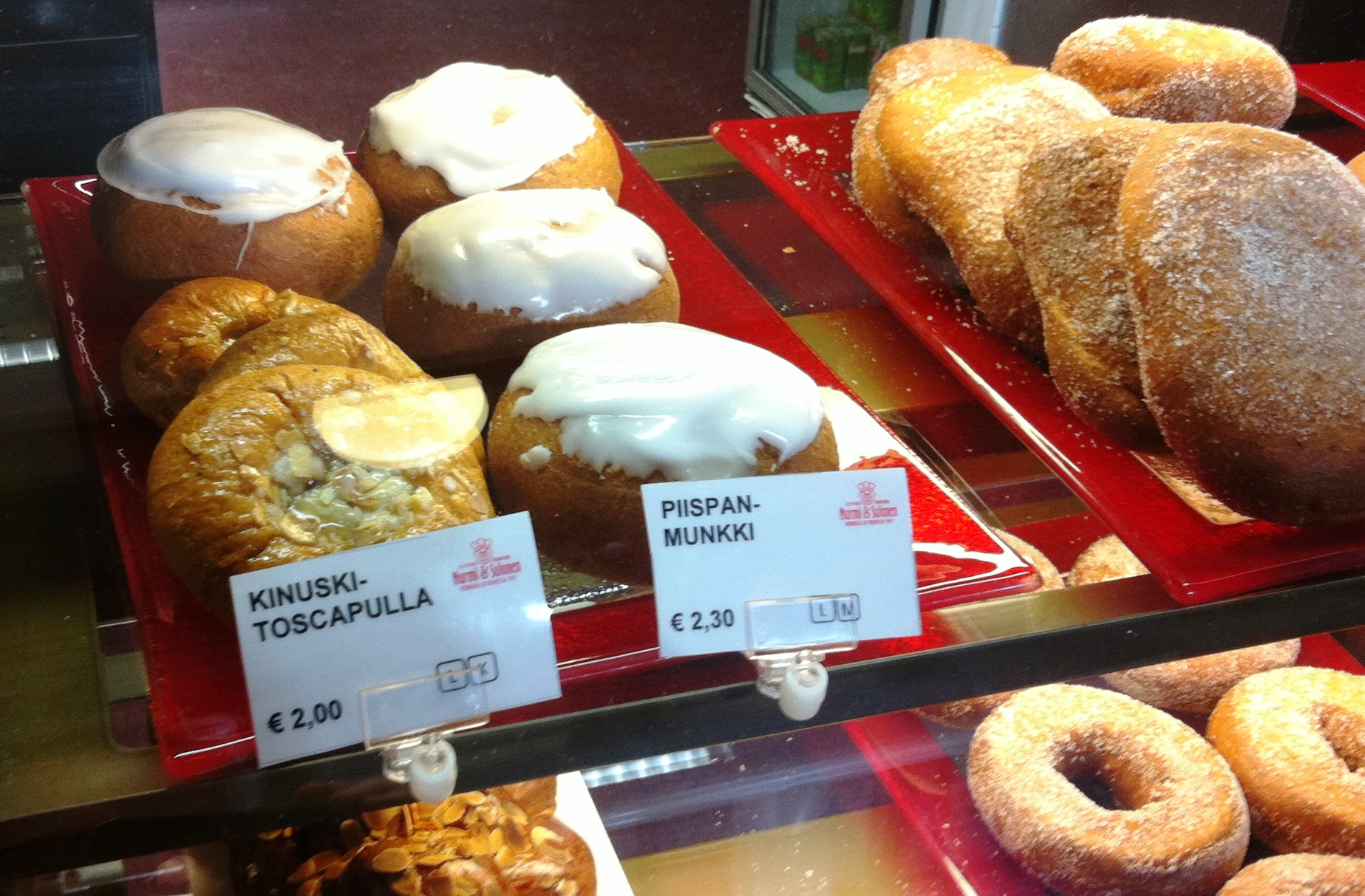
Piispanmunkki, a traditional pastry in Turku

Traditional food from Turku is also traditional food from the region of Southwest Finland. Raisin sausage called rusinamakkara, fish in various forms (especially Baltic herring), sourdough bread, and saaristolaisleipä (a type of slightly sweet rye bread baked with cultured milk, malt, bran, rye flour and syrup) are traditional foods typical of the area. The piispanmunkki ("bishop's doughnut") is also among the local traditional delicacies.

The Finnish fast-food chain Hesburger originally hails from Turku.

=== Association and city rivalry ===
The Finnish people associate Turku with its "old and historic" charm. Established in 1957, Turkuseura-Åbosamfundet ry is a bilingual, politically neutral historical society with 2,200 members. Its main focus is to cherish Turku's culture and dialect, and to preserve local history and traditions. The society strives to promote and enhance Turku's positive image.

Turku and Tampere are two cities in Finland that exhibit a cordial rivalry through humorous banter. Humorous topics include Tampere's traditional dish, mustamakkara, Turku's Aura River, and distinct regional accents. Both cities boast excellent culinary scenes, which attract food lovers. Since 1997, students from Tampere have annually visited Turku to participate in the custom of leaping on the market square. This lively event is thought to nudge the city towards the Baltic Sea and counteract post-glacial rebound.

== Sports ==
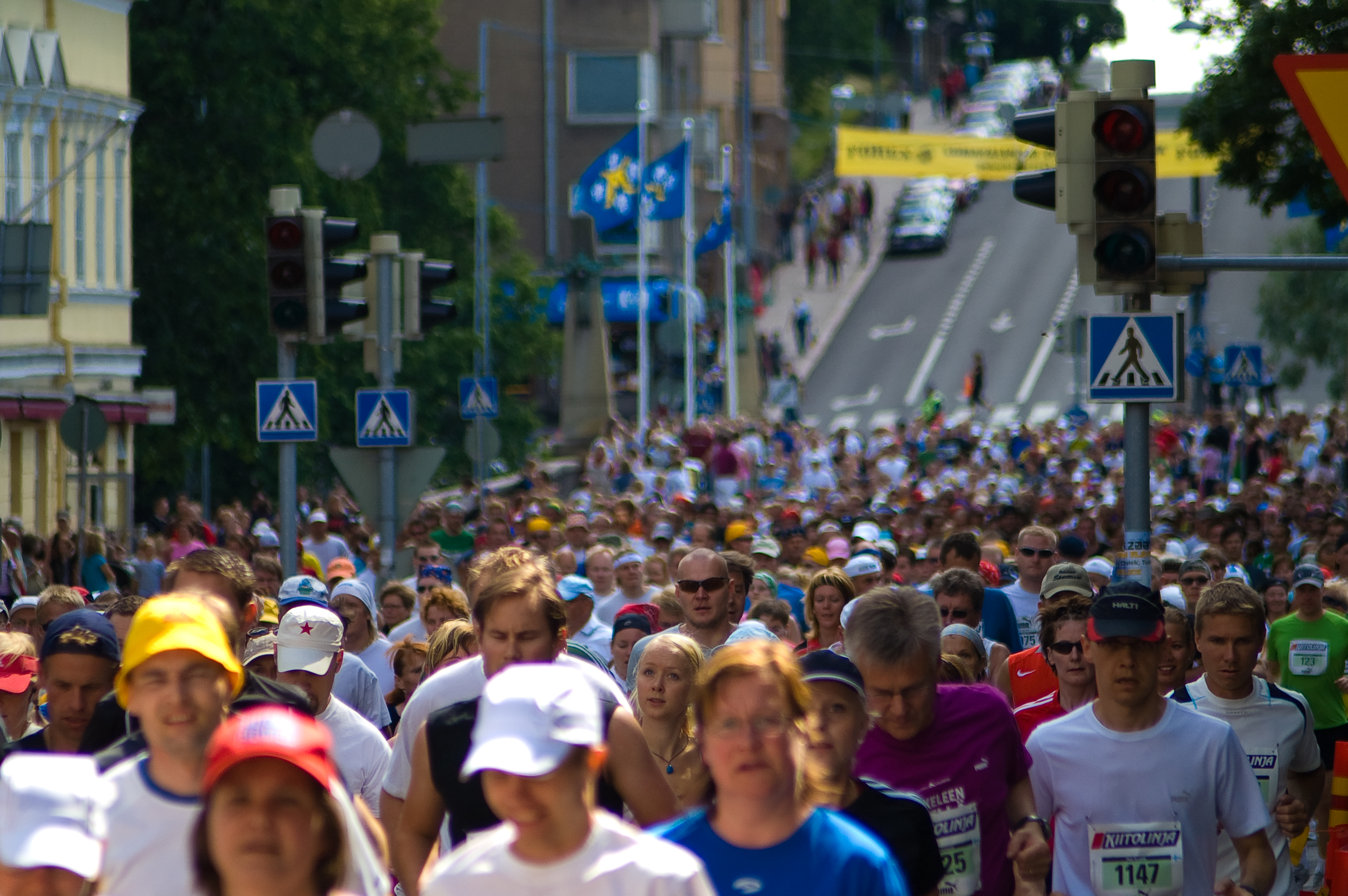
Paavo Nurmi Marathon is run every summer

Turku has two major football teams playing in the top national league Veikkausliiga: FC Inter, and TPS. Both teams are based at Veritas Stadion in Kupittaa.

The HC TPS is an ice hockey team that competes in the top level, SM-liiga, and has secured 11 national championships. They play their games at Gatorade Center in Artukainen.

The city also hosts the annual Paavo Nurmi Marathon, named after the legendary Turku-born runner Paavo Nurmi.

Turku is home to the Eagles Rugby Football Club, a division champion affiliated with Suomen Rugbyliitto, which trains and competes at Impivaara Jalkapallonhalli and Kupittaanpuisto.

Turku Titans is a lacrosse club with a rich history, having scored three silver and one gold medals in Finland's national lacrosse league. The Titans' women's team has also achieved success. Furthermore, the city hosted the FIL U19 2012 World Lacrosse Championships.

Finnish tennis player Jarkko Nieminen, from the nearby county of Masku, is among the most accomplished players in Finland.

== Government and politics ==
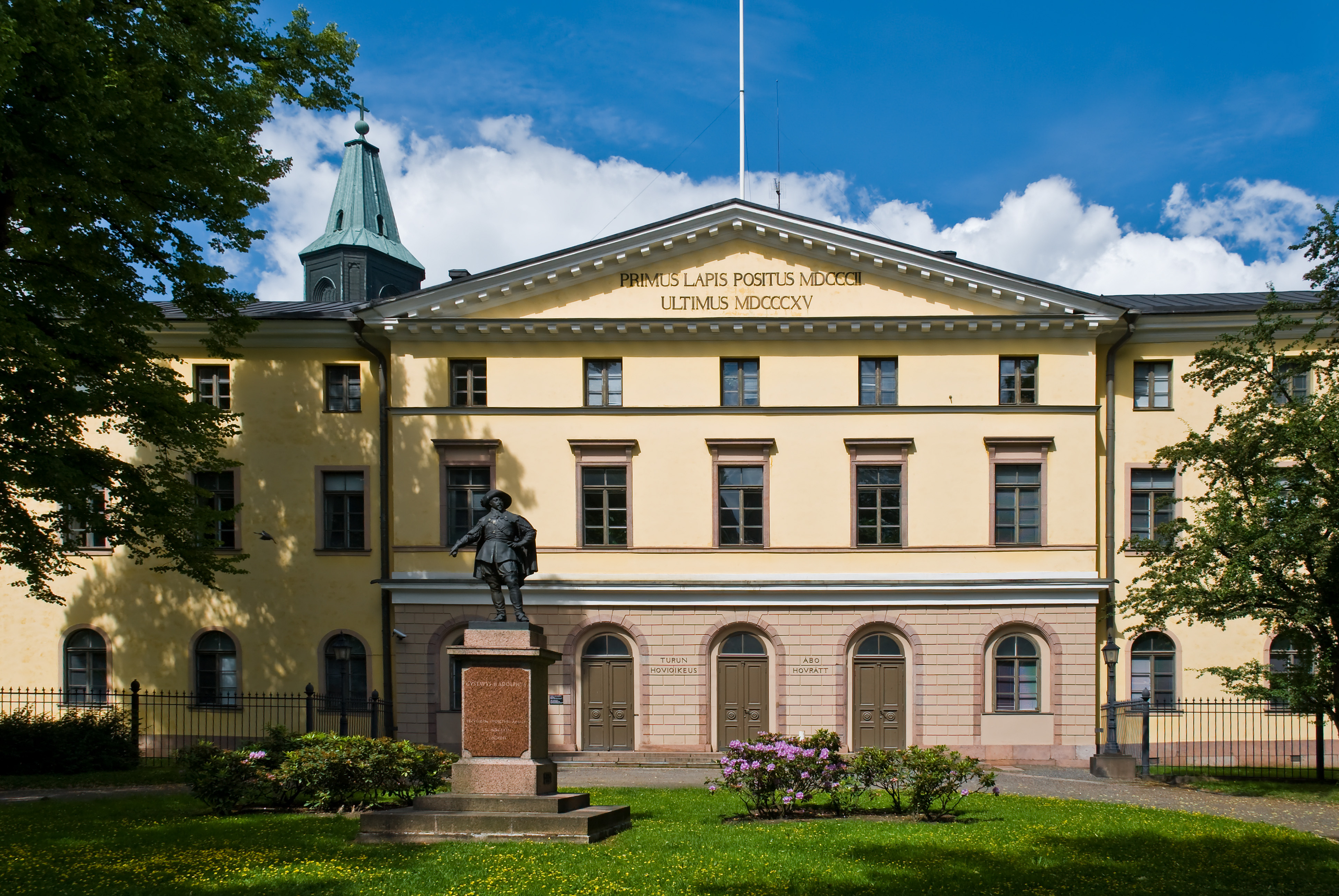
The Court of Appeal and Academy House of Turku

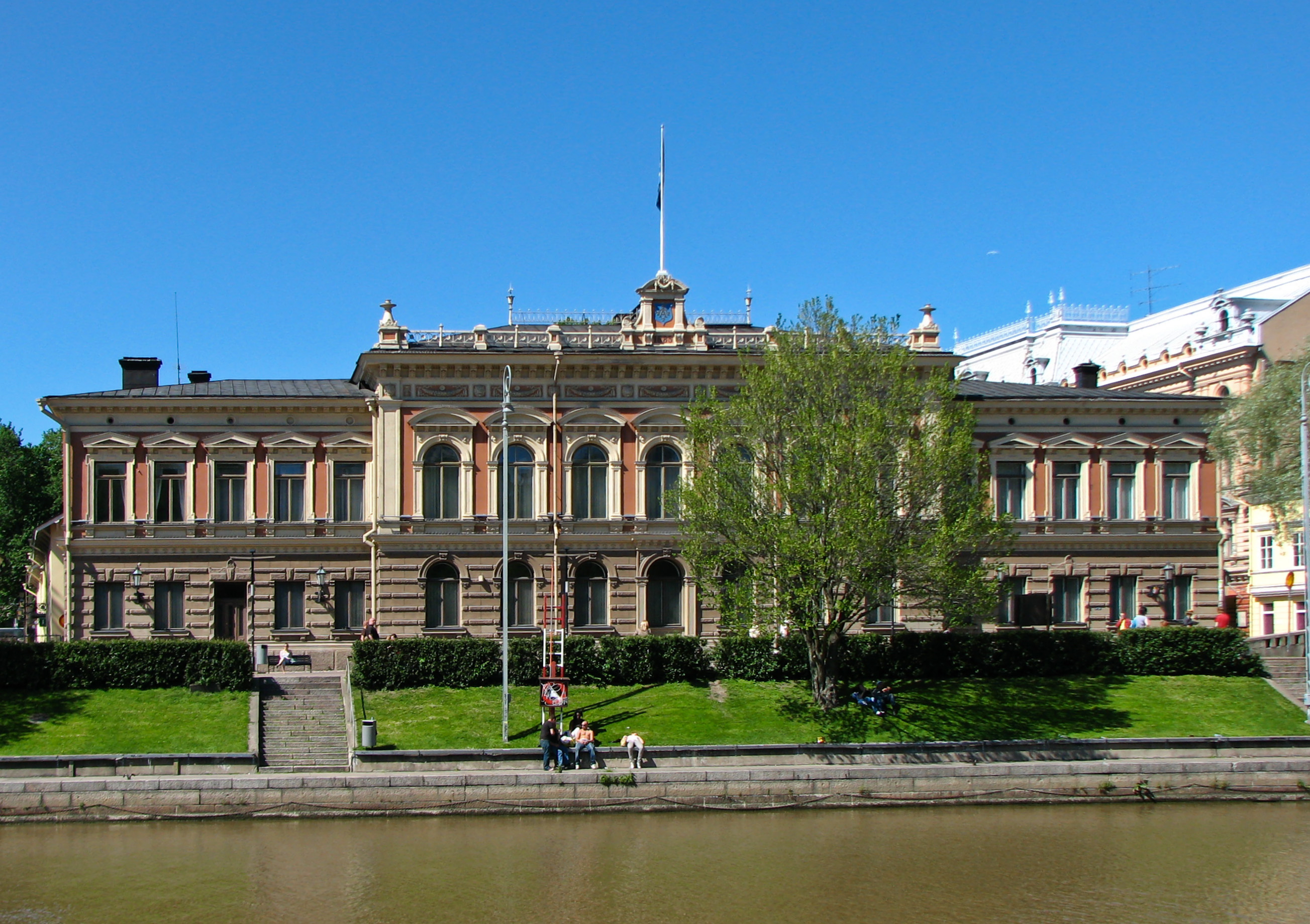
Turku City Hall, on the west side of the Aura River

Turku is an important administrative centre, being the regional capital, and hosting the seat of the Archbishop of Finland and a Court of Appeal. Minna Arve has been the mayor of Turku since 2017. Since August 2021 her role as the mayor has been an elected office instead of a hired position.

The city council of Turku has 67 seats. Following the 2021 municipal election, the council seats are allocated in the following way: National Coalition Party 16 seats, Social Democrats 13, Left Alliance 11, Green League 10, True Finns 9, Centre Party 3, Swedish People's Party 3, Movement Now 1, and Christian Democrats 1. The current chair of the city board is Sini Ruohonen from National Coalition Party.

Results of the 2019 Finnish parliamentary election in Turku:

- National Coalition Party 20.5%
- Social Democratic Party 17.1%
- Left Alliance 16.8%
- True Finns 15.7%
- Green League 13.8%
- Swedish People's Party 5.5%
- Centre Party 4.7%
- Movement Now 1.9%
- Christian Democrats 1.6%

== Transport ==
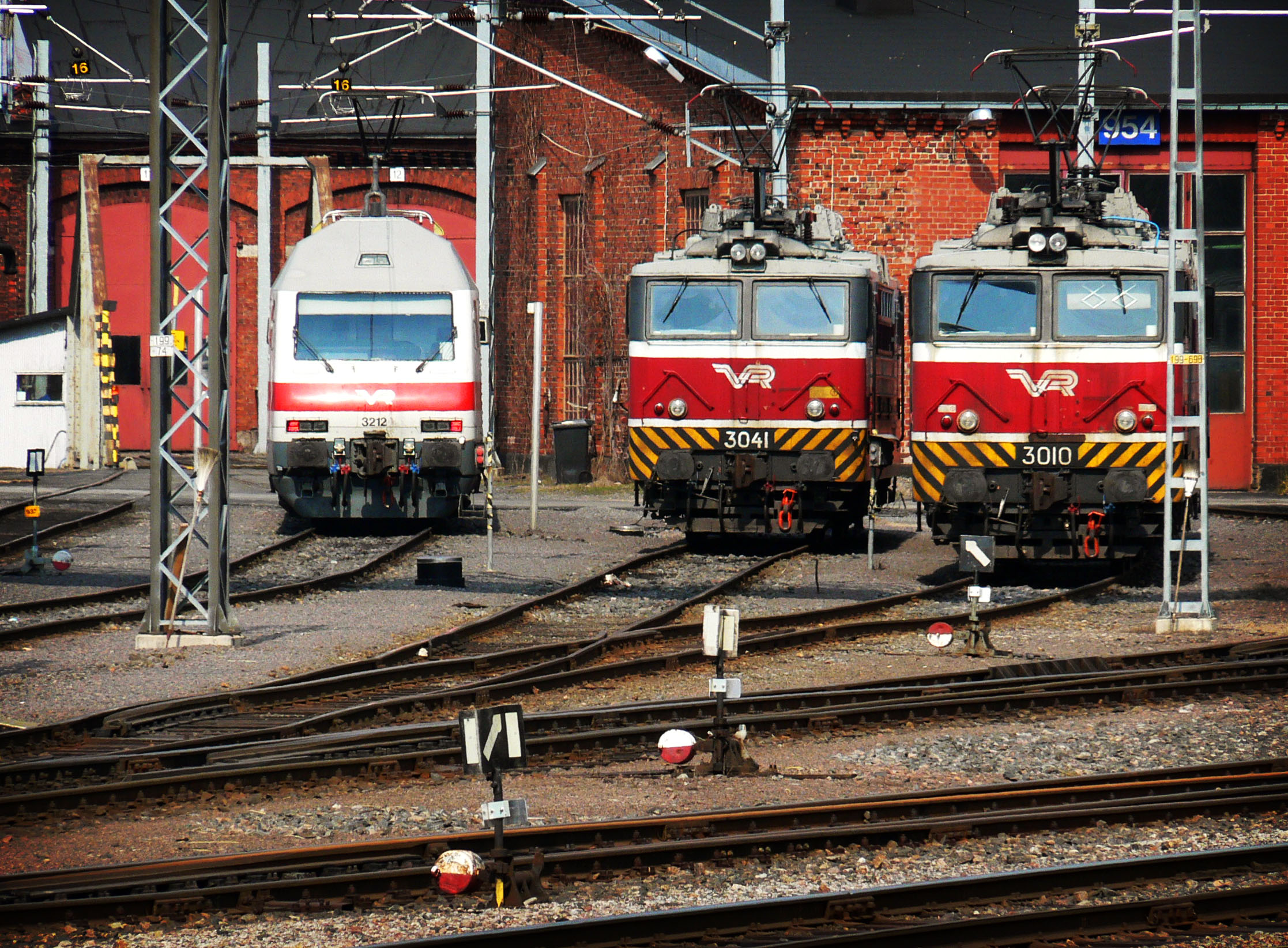
Locomotives at Turku Central Station

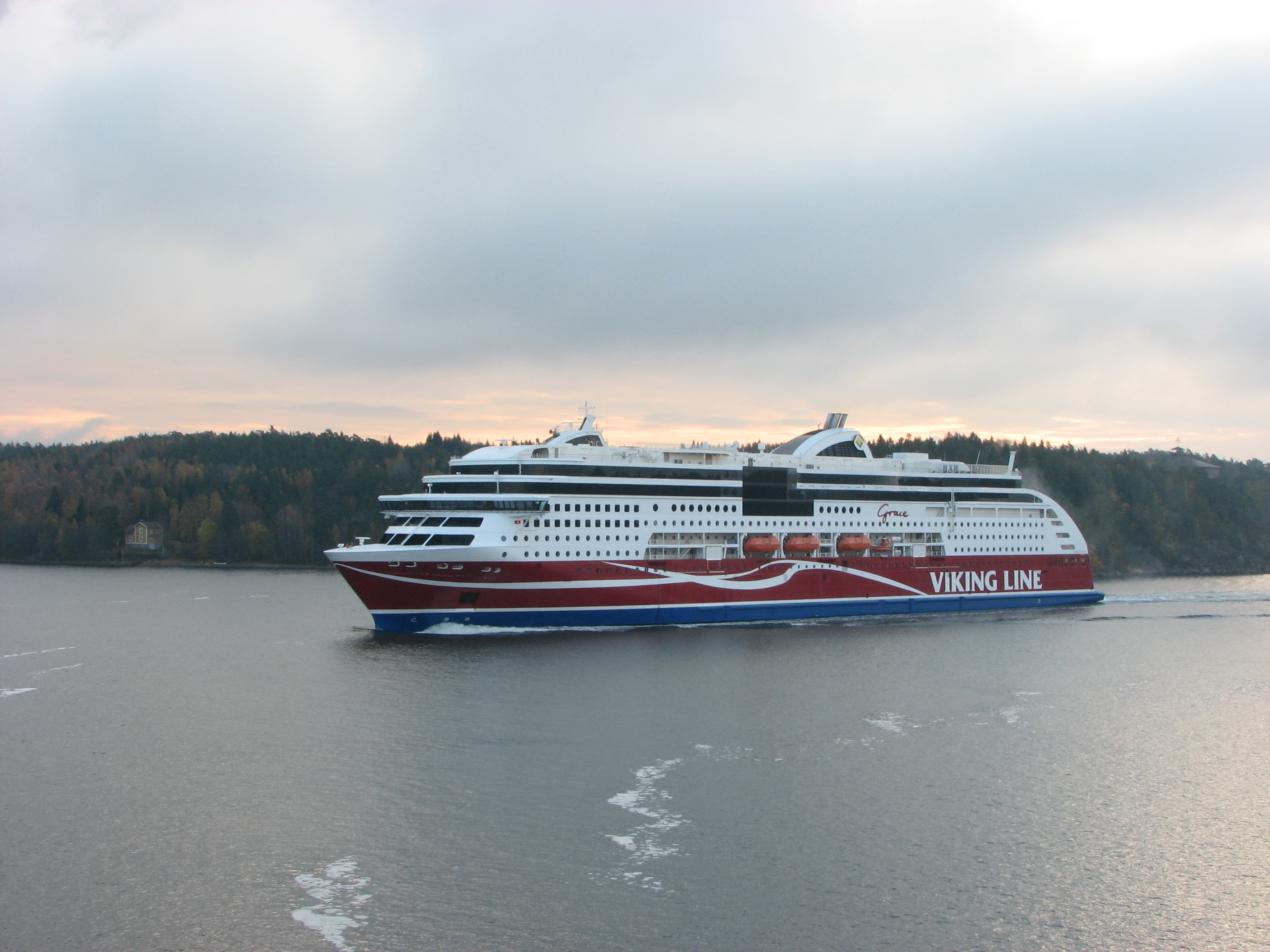
Viking Line's M/S Viking Grace in the Turku Archipelago

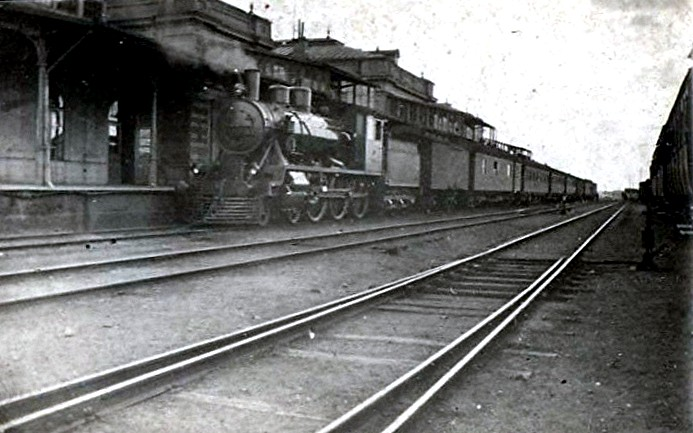
VR Class Hv1 steam locomotive at Turku railway station in the 1920s

For a city of its size, Turku has a moderate public transport network of bus routes, which is comparable to the bus network of similar-sized Tampere. The bus network is managed and supervised by the Turku City Region's Public Transport Committee (FÖLI) (Finnish: Turun kaupunkiseudun joukkoliikennelautakunta, Swedish: kollektivtrafiknämnden för Åbo stadsregion), and is operated mainly by private companies. Bus traffic to and in the neighbouring municipalities of Kaarina, Lieto, Naantali, Raisio and Rusko are also handled by FÖLI. The bus rates are the same when traveling within these municipalities.

Rail traffic to and from Turku is handled by the Finnish national carrier, VR. The number of services has fallen and only the railways towards Tampere and Helsinki are now in use. The railway stations currently used for passenger traffic are the Turku Central railway station in Pohjola, and two smaller stations in Kupittaa and the Port of Turku.

There is no local rail traffic at the moment, as the city's popular tram services were discontinued in 1972, and the various local railway lines to neighbouring towns and municipalities were all abolished during the late 20th century. However, there are plans for a light rail system in the Turku region in the near future. According to the current estimate the tramway's construction will start in 2028 and finish in 2033. The first route will be constructed between Turku Port−City Centre−Varissuo residential area. Route's estimated length is 11 kilometers (6.8 miles) with 17 stops.

The first outdoor inclined elevator, the Funicular, is located in Turku. The elevator offers unimpeded access to Kakolanmäki hill, where there is no other public transport. The Funicular has two stations, and the travelling time between the stations is approximately one minute. It is possible to hop on and off at both stations, and travelling is free of charge. The elevator's rail is about 130 metres long, and the height difference between the two stations is about 30 metres.

The State of Finland has announced plans to support Espoo with 30% of full expenses on a new metro rail, the Regional Council of Southwest Finland is going to use this as a test case for a new light rail network in Turku.

The Turku Bus Station and the Turku Central railway station are currently located in different places. The City of Turku is planning to combine these two in a new greater station complex in the near future. This new travel center will consist of a hotel and several shopping estates. This center will connect all public transportation from commuter trains to long-distance buses.

Turku's most significant highways for traffic are Highway 1 leading to Helsinki; Highway 10 leading to Hämeenlinna; Highway 9 leading to Tampere, Jyväskylä, Kuopio and Joensuu; Highway 8 leading to Pori, Vaasa and Oulu; and the Turku Ring Road, which protrudes circumferentially from Turku.

Turku Airport is located 8 kilometres (5 miles) to the north of the city centre, partly in the neighbouring municipality of Rusko. The airport is served by six passenger airlines, including airBaltic and SAS Scandinavian, and one cargo airline.

There are also daily ferry services from the Port of Turku to Sweden and Åland, operated by Silja Line and Viking Line. These are something of a Finnish cultural tradition (see ruotsinlaiva), and people often travel long distances across Finland to Turku just to take a cruise across the Gulf of Bothnia.

The Archipelago Sea boat traffic is handled by, among others, SS Ukkopekka, an old steamship that cruises on the route Turku-Naantali-Turku.

Turku is the only city in Finland to have three long-distance railway stations: Turku Central, Turku Harbour (see Port of Turku), and Kupittaa.

== Education ==
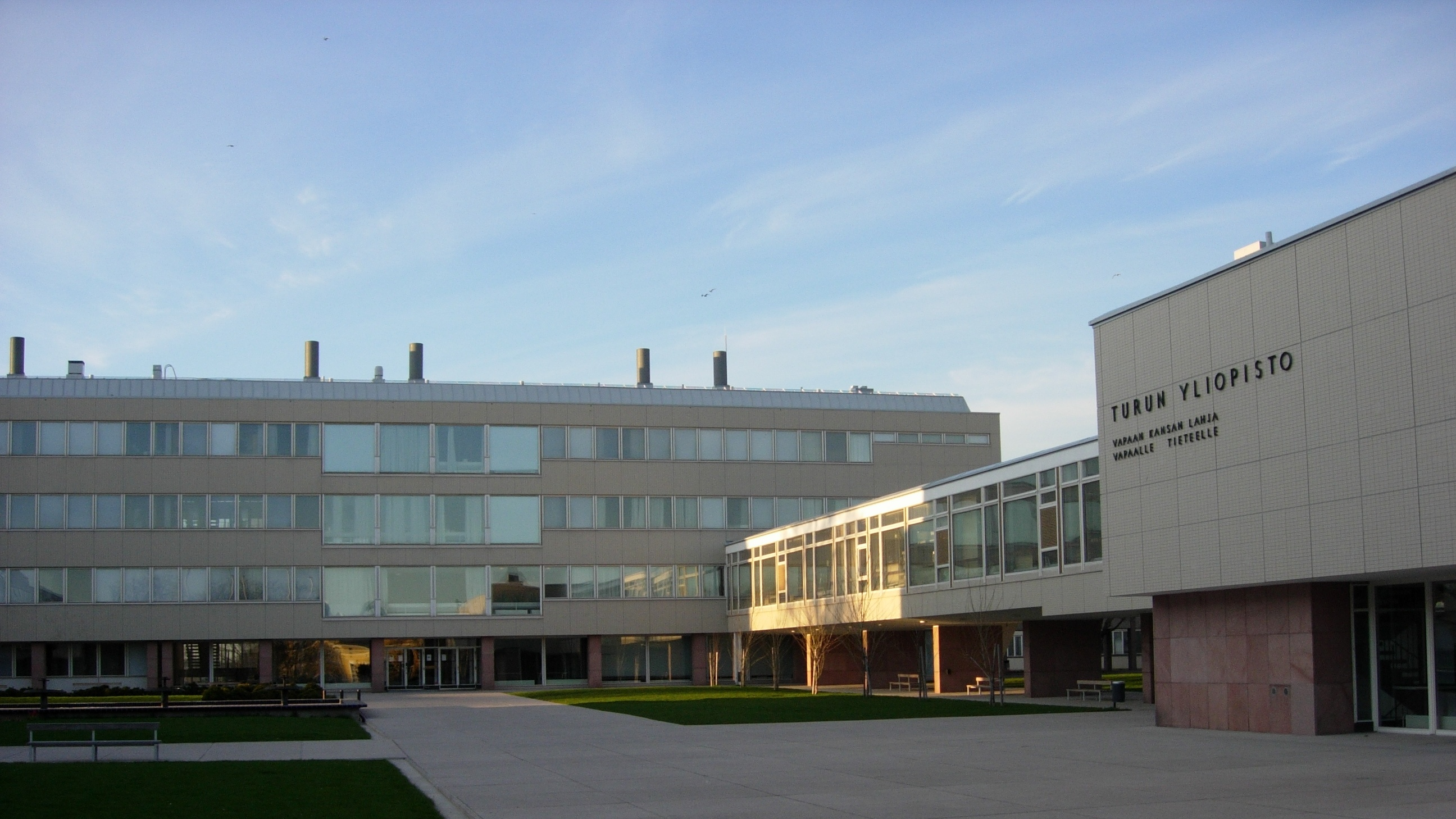
The main building of the University of Turku

Turku has a longer educational history than any other Finnish city: the first school in the city, the Cathedral School, was founded along with Turku Cathedral in the late 13th century. The first university in Finland, the Royal Academy of Turku (now University of Helsinki), was established in the city in 1640. In 1820, the first school in Finland conforming to the Bell-Lancaster method was founded in Turku with the aim of making primary education more inclusive to the lower classes.

Turku is home to about 40 000 higher education students. There are two universities and several "polytechnics" in the town.

Turku is the only city in Finland to have two Universities. The Finnish University of Turku is the fourth-largest university in Finland (22,300 students in 2022), as measured by student enrollment, and one of the oldest as well, having been founded in 1920. Approximately 9% of all students are international students. Åbo Akademi, founded in 1918 as the second university of Finland, is one of the country's two Swedish-language universities. Turku School of Economics merged with The University of Turku in 2010, and Åbo handelshögskola, its Swedish counterpart, with Åbo Akademi in 1980. The central hospital of Turku, Turku University Hospital, is affiliated with the university and is used as a teaching hospital.

Turku University of Applied Sciences (TUAS) is the second largest polytechnic in Finland (12,000 students in 2022) after Metropolia University of Applied Sciences. TUAS consists of six campus buildings in Turku and one separate campus in town of Salo. Bachelors of Business Administration, Social Services and Health Care Nursing study at Salo IoT Campus. TUAS offers Bachelor and Master studies in over 70 fields of education.

Also, Novia University of Applied Sciences and Diaconia University of Applied Sciences have campuses in the town.

Turku is one of only two cities in Finland to have an established international school (the other city being Helsinki). Turku International School, located in the eastern district of Varissuo, has been operating since 2003. By an agreement signed between the city of Turku and the University of Turku, Turun normaalikoulu takes care of the teaching in the international school.

== Media ==
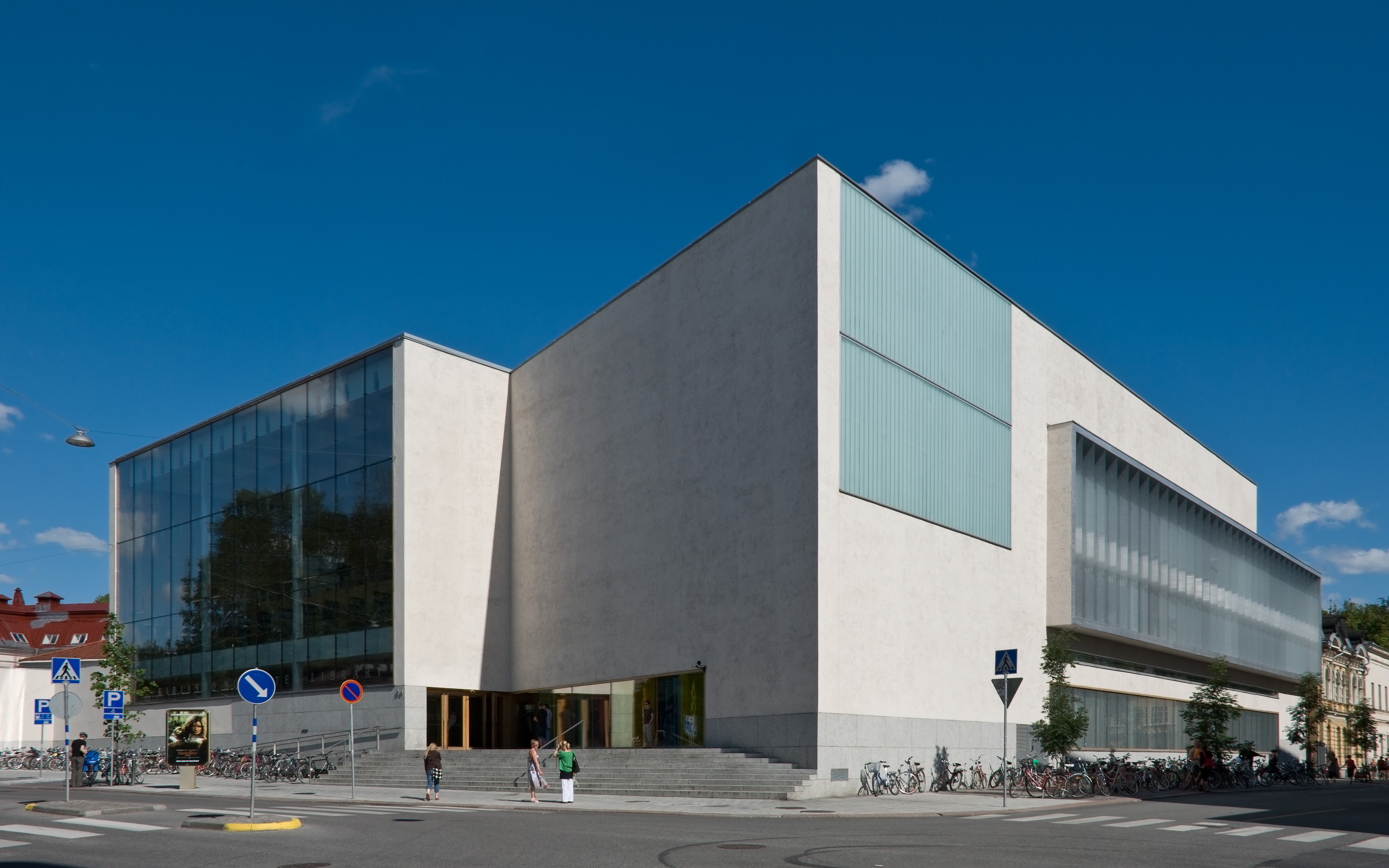
Turku Main Library

The most widely read newspaper of Turku and the area around it is the daily regional morning newspaper Turun Sanomat, which has a readership of over 70% of the population every day. Åbo Underrättelser, a Swedish-language newspaper published in Turku, is the oldest newspaper in Finland, having been published since 1824.

The free-of-charge Turkulainen newspaper was among the most popular newspapers prior to its hiatus in 2020; it is expected to return to print in November 2026.

There are also a number of more localized newspapers such as Kulmakunta (for the eastern suburbs of Turku, including Varissuo and Lauste), and Rannikkoseutu (for the area around the neighbouring cities of Raisio and Naantali).

The first Finnish newspaper, Tidningar Utgifne Af et Sällskap i Åbo, in Swedish, was begun in Turku in 1771, as well as the first Finnish-language newspaper, Suomenkieliset Tieto-Sanomat, which was begun in 1775.

The newspaper Turun Sanomat also operated a regional television station, called Turku-TV, but the station stopped operating in 2012. The Finnish national broadcaster Yleisradio screens local news, daily from Monday to Friday, for the residents of southwestern Finland (including the regions of Southwest Finland and Satakunta). All Finnish national TV channels are viewable and national radio channels audible in the Turku area. In addition, a number of local radio stations, e.g. Auran Aallot, Radio Sata and Radio Robin Hood are operational. Local public service radio stations are Yle Turun Radio broadcasting in Finnish (the regional version of Yle Radio Suomi) and Yle Vega Åboland broadcasting in Swedish (the regional version of Yle Vega).

== Notable people ==
- Rauno Aaltonen, rally driver
- Fredrika Bremer (1801–1865), writer and feminist reformer, born at Tuorla Manor in Piikkiö Parish.
- Teemu Brunila, singer, songwriter, musician and producer
- Antti Buri, racing driver
- Anders Dahl (1751–1789), botanist and student of Carl Linnaeus
- Toni-Ville Henrik Virtanen, electronic music producer known as Darude, author of the hit song "Sandstorm"
- Karl Ebb, athlete and racing driver
- Alex Federley, political cartoonist and illustrator
- Marcus Forss, football player, member of Finland's UEFA Euro 2020 squad
- Johan Gadolin (1760–1852), chemist, physicist and mineralogist
- Kasper Hämäläinen, football player
- Janne Henriksson, football goalkeeper
- Utti Hietala, bodybuilder
- Vera Hjelt, Member of Parliament and social reformer
- Lukáš Hrádecký, football goalkeeper, member of Finland's UEFA Euro 2020 squad
- Tuuli Hypén, cartoonist
- Kaan Kairinen, football player
- Kaapo Kakko, hockey player
- Katja Kallio (born 1968), novelist, journalist, columnist and screenwriter
- Pehr Kalm (1716–1779), explorer, botanist, naturalist, and agricultural economist
- Joni Kauko, football player, member of Finland's UEFA Euro 2020 squad
- Miikka Kiprusoff, former professional ice hockey goaltender who played for the Calgary Flames and San Jose Sharks during his NHL career
- Mauno Koivisto, 9th president of Finland
- Saku and Mikko Koivu, ice hockey playing brothers playing respectively in Montréal and Anaheim Ducks and Minnesota Wild as an alternate captain and captain
- Christina Krook (1742–1806), educator
- Matti Kuusimäki, lawyer
- Joalin Loukamaa, a member of global pop group Now United
- Agnes Lundell (1878–1936), Finland's first female lawyer
- Erik Johan Löfgren, portrait painter
- Matias Maccelli, ice hockey player currently playing for the Toronto Maple Leafs of the NHL
- Baron C. G. E. Mannerheim, military leader and statesman
- Marjatta Metsovaara, textile artist
- Niklas Moisander, former captain of Finland national football team
- Michael Monroe, rock musician, the vocalist of Hanoi Rocks
- Paavo Nurmi, The Flying Finn, 9 time Olympic Champion in long-distance running
- Joni Ortio, professional ice hockey goaltender currently playing for HC Vityaz of the KHL
- Elli Pikkujämsä, defender for KIF Örebro DFF and the Finland women's national football team
- Taru Rinne, motorcycle racer
- Rasmus Ristolainen, ice hockey player currently with the Philadelphia Flyers of the NHL
- Jethro Rostedt, real estate agent and businessman
- Seppo Ruohonen (1946–2020), opera singer
- Jarno Saarinen, 1972 Grand Prix motorcycle racing world champion
- Matti Salminen, bass singer
- Henri Sigfridsson (born 1974), classical pianist
- Tabe Slioor, socialite, reporter and photojournalist
- Darren Smith, a South African-born football player
- Herman Spöring Jr. (1733–1771), explorer and botanist
- Elsa Sylvestersson, ballet dancer and choreographer
- Jere Uronen, football player, member of Finland's UEFA Euro 2020 squad
- Jonne Valtonen, composer
- Johannes Rojola, indie game developer (My Summer Car, My Winter Car)

== International relations ==
=== Twin towns – sister cities ===
Turku is twinned with:

- Aarhus, Denmark (1946)
- Bergen, Norway (1946)
- Bratislava, Slovakia (1976)
- Cologne, Germany (1967)
- Constanța, Romania (1958)
- Florence, Italy (1992)
- Gdańsk, Poland (1958)
- Gothenburg, Sweden (1946)
- Kharkiv, Ukraine (2022)
- Rostock, Germany (1958)
- Szeged, Hungary (1971)
- Tartu, Estonia (2008)
- Varna, Bulgaria (1963)

In March 2022, Turku suspended the agreement with Saint Petersburg, Russia (twinning since 1953) due to the Russian invasion of Ukraine.

=== Co-operation agreements ===
Turku has co-operation agreements with:

- Tallinn, Estonia
- Tianjin, China

== Gallery ==
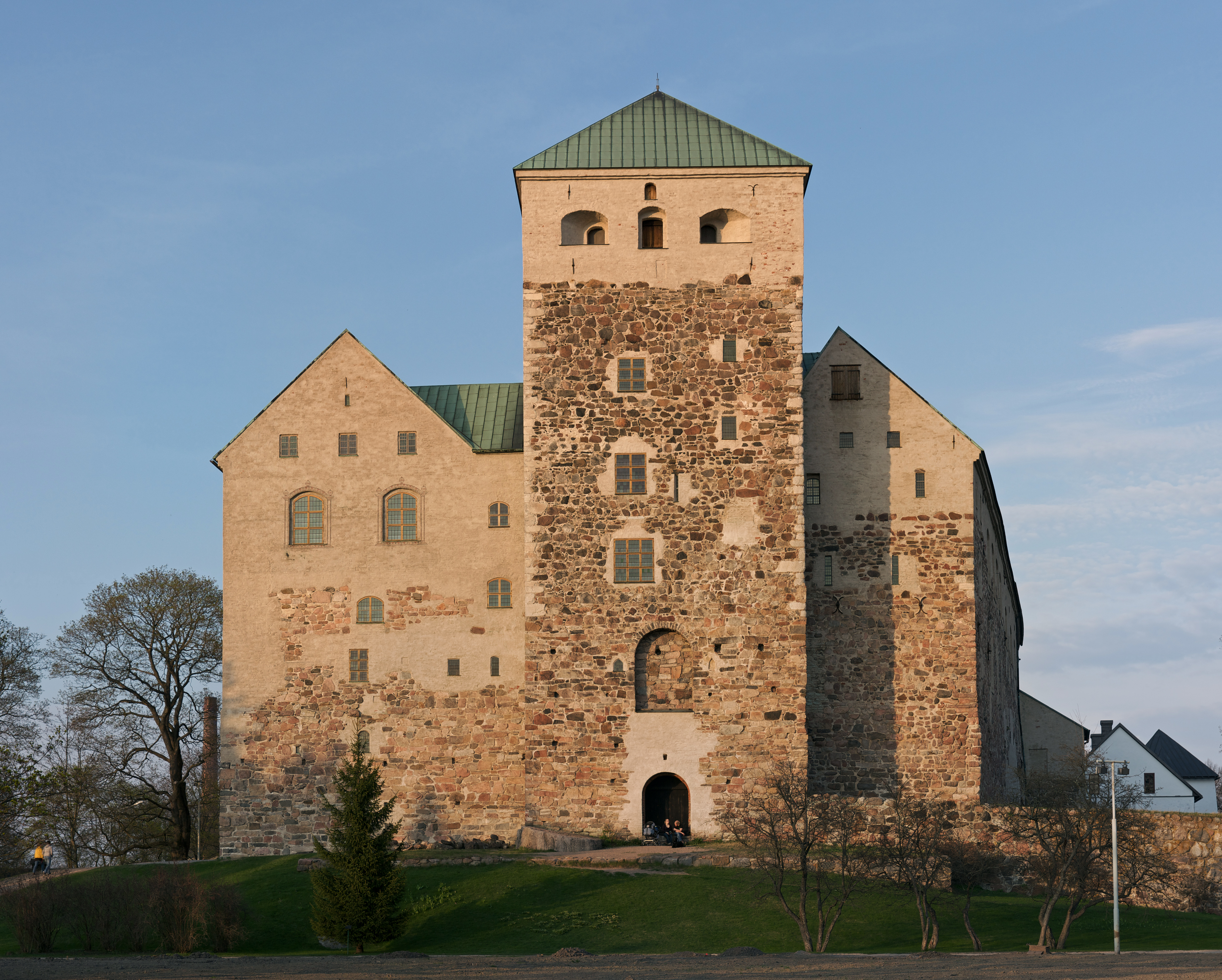
The medieval Turku Castle as seen from the harbour side

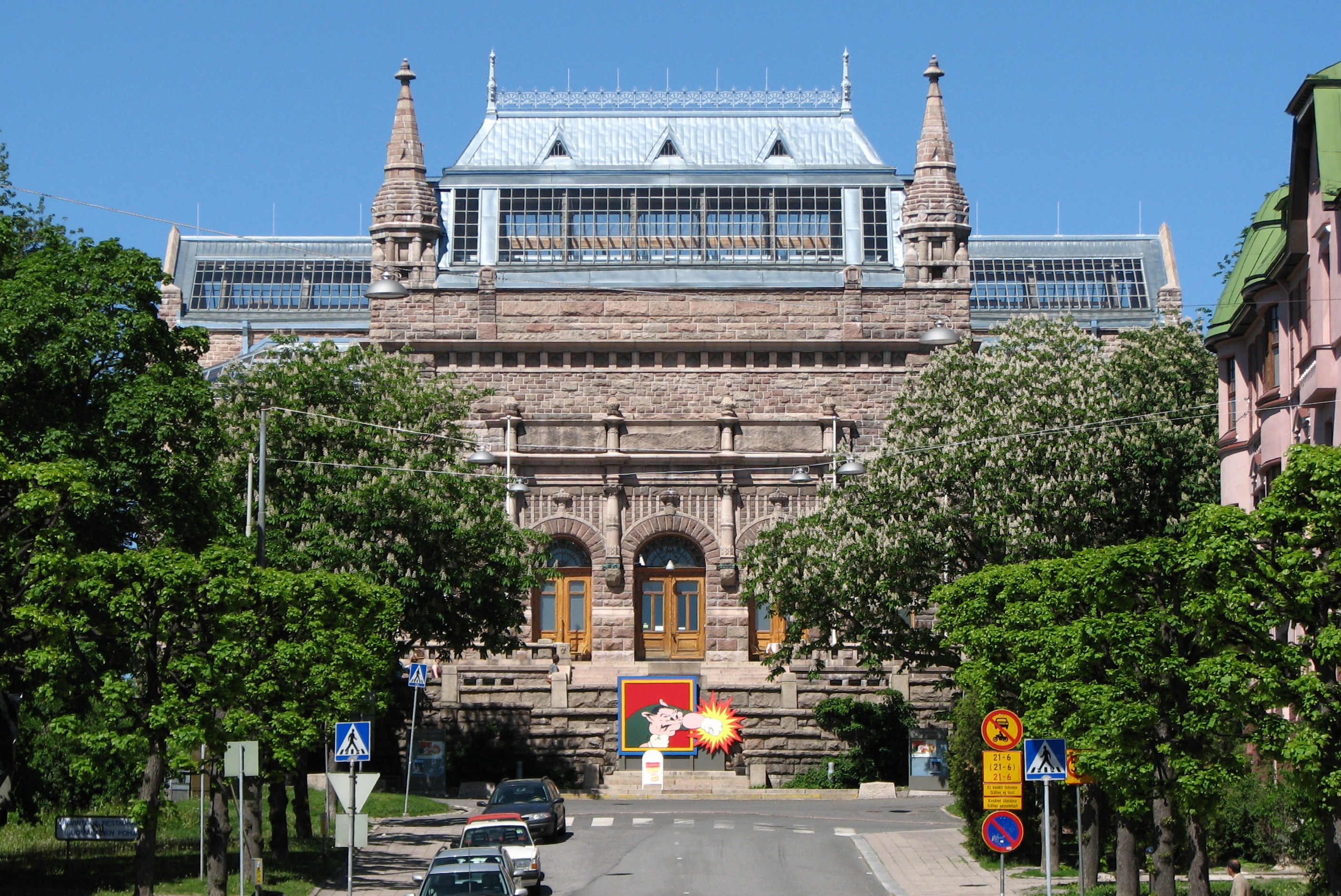
Turku Art Museum is a classical example of Romantic nationalism in architecture.

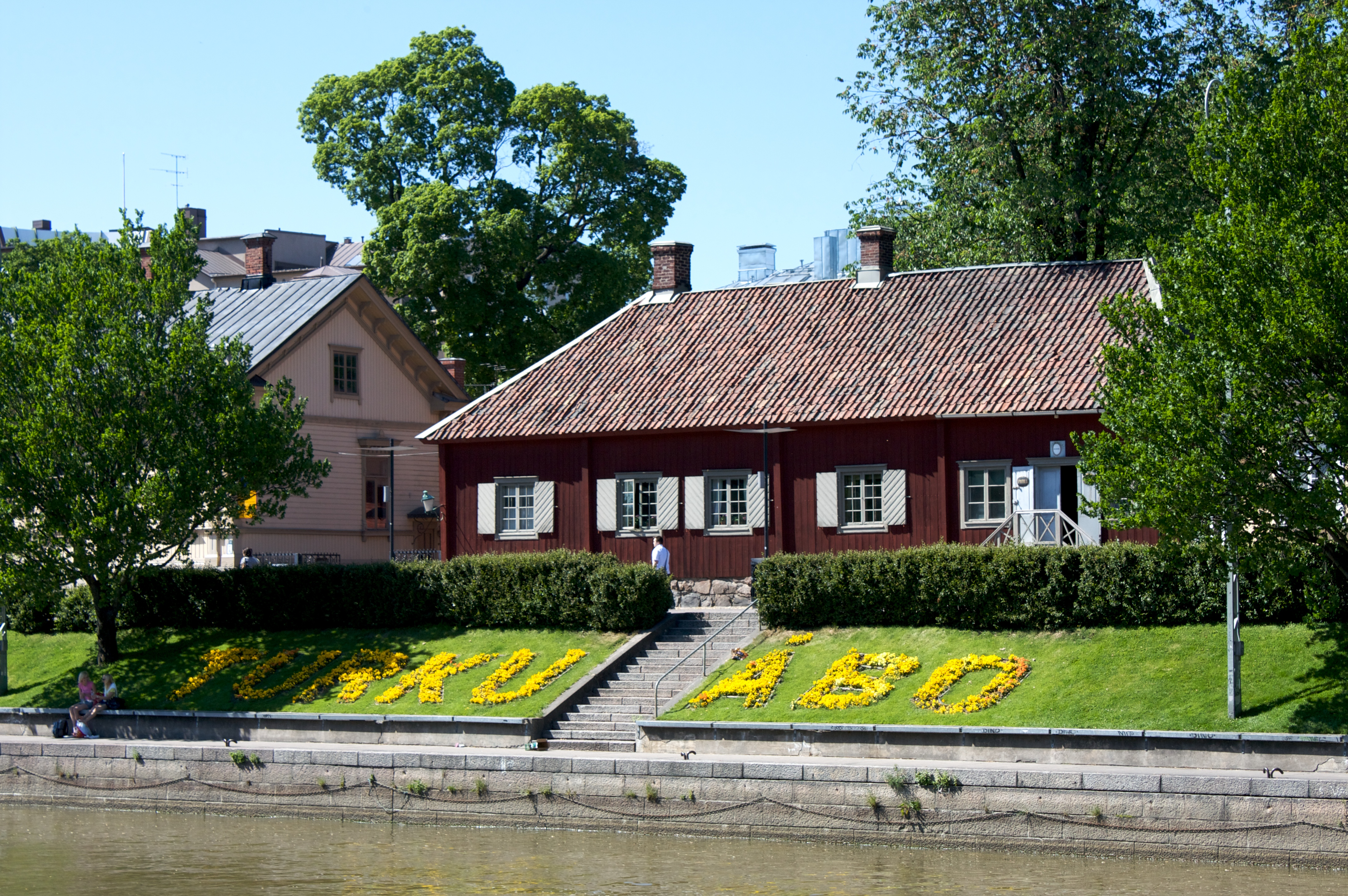
Pharmacy museum

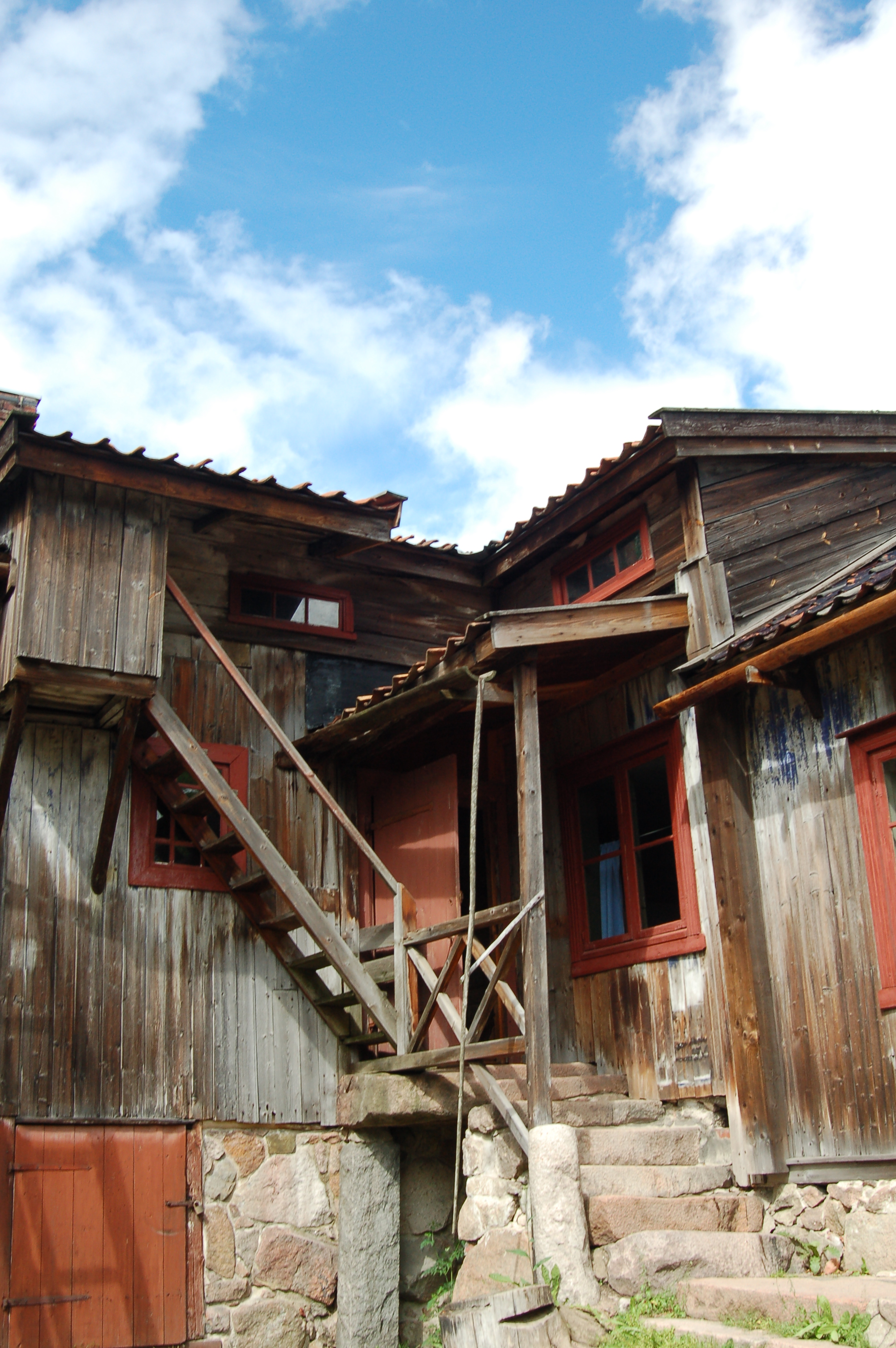
Luostarinmäki open-air museum

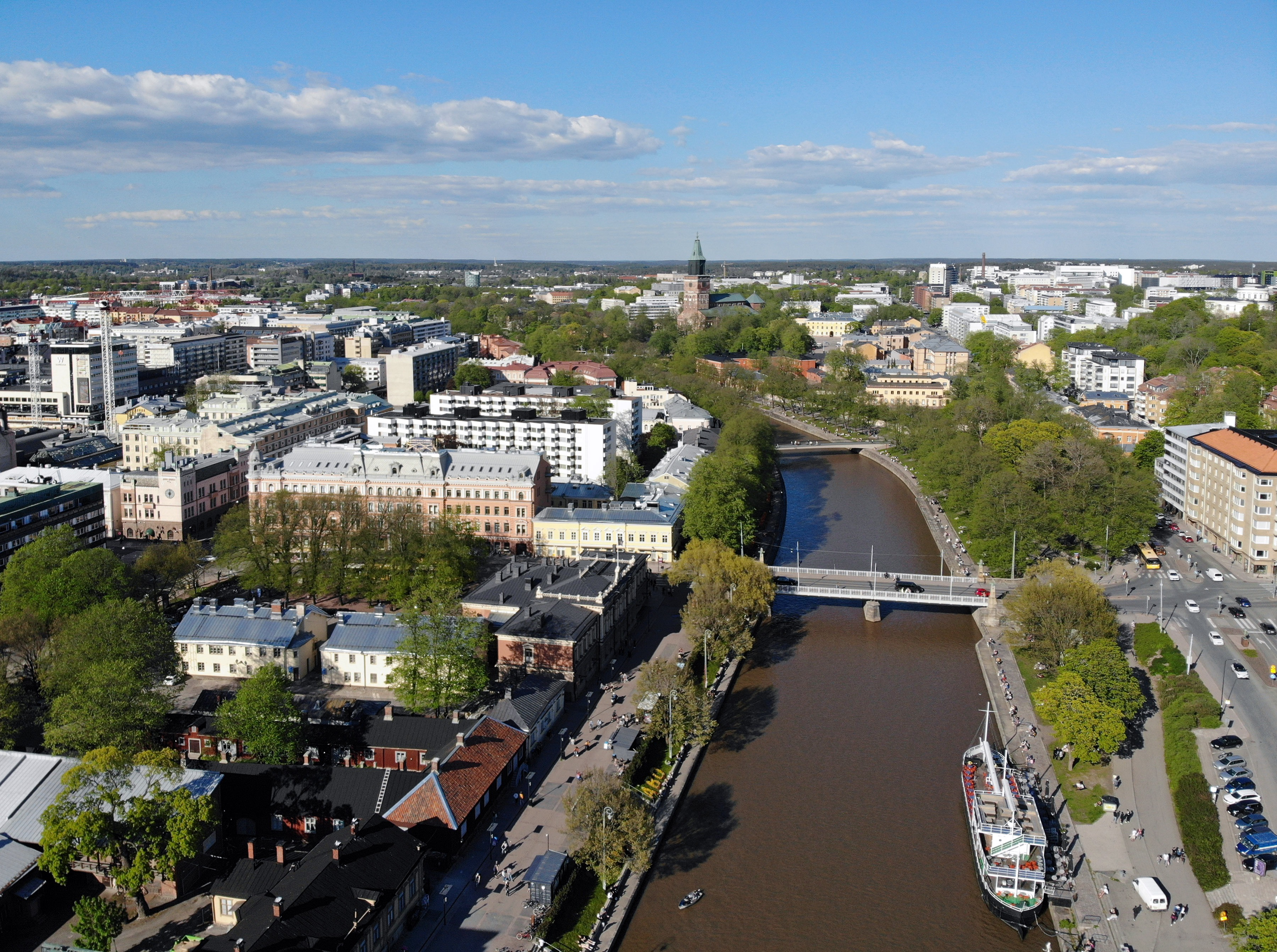
Aura River in central Turku

== See also ==
- Archipelago Sea
- Bishop Henry
- Christmas Peace
- Great Fire of Turku
- History of Turku
- King's Road
- Posankka
- Royal Academy of Turku
- Turku Cemetery

=== Other medieval cities and towns of Finland ===
- Naantali
- Porvoo
- Rauma
- Ulvila
- Vyborg (now in Russia)

== Sources ==
- Lahtinen, Rauno (2015). Turun historia [History of Turku] (in Finnish) (second ed.). Turku: Turkuseura. ISBN 978-952-7025-04-8.
- Turku at EuroWeather.
