= List of museums in Finland =

This is an incomplete list of museums in Finland. According to a report, the total number of museums in Finland is 280 (2013), of which 139 are cultural history museums, 71 special museums, 55 art museums and 17 natural history museums. Circa 160 of these are run professionally. The central organisation for Finnish museums is the 1923 established Finnish Museums Association.

== National museums ==
National central museums of Finland are the Finnish Museum of Natural History, the National Museum of Finland and the Finnish National Gallery which comprises three museums; Ateneum, Kiasma, and the Sinebrychoff Art Museum.

Name	Image	Location	Type	Established
Finnish Museum of Natural History		Helsinki	Natural history	1923
National Museum of Finland		Helsinki	History	1916
Finnish National Gallery				
Ateneum		Helsinki	Art	1887
Kiasma		Helsinki	Contemporary art	1996
Sinebrychoff Art Museum		Helsinki	Art	1921

== Regional museums and regional art museums ==
Finland has 22 regional museums and 16 regional art museums. They are responsible for promoting and guiding museum activities in their own area. The regional museum network was established in 1980 by the Finnish Ministry of Education and Culture. The regional network covers the whole of Finland excluding Åland.

=== Regional museums ===
Name	Image	Location	Region	Established
Ekenäs museumcentre EKTA		Ekenäs	Uusimaa	1906
Helsinki City Museum		Helsinki	Greater Helsinki	1911
Hämeenlinna Historical Museum		Hämeenlinna	Kanta-Häme	1910
Kainuu Museum		Kajaani	Kainuu	1930
K. H. Renlund Museum – Central Ostrobothnia Regional Museum		Kokkola	Central Ostrobothnia	1909
Kuopio Cultural History Museum		Kuopio	North Savo	1884
Kuopio Natural History Museum		Kuopio	North Savo	1897
Lahti Historical Museum		Lahti	Päijät-Häme	1924
Museum Centre of Turku		Turku	Southwest Finland	1881
Museum Centre Vapriikki		Tampere	Pirkanmaa	1996
Museum of Central Finland		Jyväskylä	Central Finland	1932
Museum of Kymenlaakso		Kotka	Kymenlaakso	1927
North Karelian Museum		Joensuu	Northern Karelia	1917
Northern Ostrobothnia museum		Oulu	Northern Ostrobothnia	1896
Ostrobothnian Museum		Vaasa	Ostrobothnia	1896
Porvoo Museum		Porvoo	Eastern Uusimaa	1980
Provincial Museum of Lapland		Rovaniemi	Lapland (excluding Torne Valley and Sea Lapland)	1975
Regional Museum of South Ostrobothnia		Seinäjoki	Southern Ostrobothnia	1980
Satakunta Museum		Pori	Satakunta	1888
Savonlinna Provincial Museum		Savonlinna	South Savo	1985
South Karelia Museum		Lappeenranta	South Karelia	1963
Torne Valley Museum		Tornio	Torne Valley, Sea Lapland	1914

=== Regional art museums ===
Name	Image	Location	Region	Established
Helsinki City Art Museum		Helsinki	Uusimaa	1974
Hämeenlinna Art Museum		Hämeenlinna	Kanta-Häme	1952
Jyväskylä Art Museum		Jyväskylä	Central Finland	1998
Joensuu Art Museum		Joensuu	Northern Karelia	1962
Kemi Art Museum		Kemi	Torne Valley, Sea Lapland	1947
Kuopio Art Museum		Kuopio	North Savo	1980
Lahti Art Museum		Lahti	Päijät-Häme	1950
Mikkeli Art Museum		Mikkeli	South Savo	1976
Nelimarkka Museum		Alajärvi	Southern Ostrobothnia	1964
Ostrobothnian Museum		Vaasa	Ostrobothnia, Central Ostrobothnia	1896
Oulu Museum of Art		Oulu	Northern Ostrobothnia, Kainuu	1963
Pori Art Museum		Pori	Satakunta	1979
Rovaniemi Art Museum		Rovaniemi	Lapland (excluding Torne Valley and Sea Lapland)	1983
South Karelia Art Museum		Lappeenranta	South Karelia, Kymenlaakso	1965
Tampere Art Museum		Tampere	Pirkanmaa	1931
Turku Art Museum		Turku	Southwest Finland	1904

== National specialist museums ==
Seventeen National specialist museums are responsible for the storage, research and exhibition of the subjects on their own field. The first specialist museums were named in 1992.

Name	Image	Location	Type	Established
Craft Museum of Finland		Jyväskylä	Craft	1982
Design Museum		Helsinki	Industrial design	1873
Finnish Aviation Museum		Vantaa	Aviation	1969
Finnish Glass Museum		Riihimäki	Glass production	1961
Finnish Labour Museum Werstas		Tampere	Social history, working life	1993
Finnish Museum of Agriculture Sarka		Loimaa	Agriculture	2005
Finnish Museum of Photography		Helsinki	Photography	1969
Finnish Railway Museum		Hyvinkää	Railway	1898
Forum Marinum		Turku	Maritime, naval history	1999
Lusto		Punkaharju	Forestry	1994
Military Museum of Finland		Helsinki	Military	1929
Mobilia		Kangasala	Automobile	1992
Museum of Finnish Architecture		Helsinki	Architecture	1956
Museum of Technology		Helsinki	Technology	1969
Siida		Inari	Sámi culture	1959
Sports Museum of Finland		Helsinki	Sport	1943
Theatre Museum		Helsinki	Theatre	1962

== Other selected museums ==
=== Art museums ===
Name	Image	Location	Type	Established
Aine Art Museum		Tornio	Art	1986
Amos Rex		Helsinki	Art	2018
Cygnaeus Gallery		Helsinki	Art	1882
Didrichsen Art Museum		Helsinki	Contemporary art	1965
Espoo Museum of Modern Art		Espoo	Contemporary art	2006
Hirvitalo		Tampere	Contemporary art	2006
Kirpilä Art Collection		Helsinki	Art	1992
Kunsthalle Helsinki		Helsinki	Contemporary art, design	1928
Kuntsi Museum of Modern Art		Vaasa	Contemporary art	2007
Rauma Art Museum		Rauma	Art	1970
Sara Hildén Art Museum		Tampere	Art	1979
Serlachius Museums		Mänttä-Vilppula	Art, history	1945
Wäinö Aaltonen Museum of Art		Turku	Contemporary art	1967

=== History and specialized museums ===
Name	Image	Location	Type	Established
Aboa Vetus & Ars Nova		Turku	History, contemporary art	1995
Alvar Aalto Museum		Jyväskylä, Helsinki	Architecture	1966
Archipelago Museum		Loviisa	Cultural history	1985
Ark Nature Centre		Pori	Natural history	2000
Artillery Museum of Finland		Hämeenlinna	Military	1977
Aviation Museum of Central Finland		Jyväskylä	Military aviation	1979
Eckerö Mail and Customs House		Eckerö	Mail, art	1994
Emil Cedercreutz Museum		Harjavalta	History, art	1916
Finnish Museum of Games		Tampere	Games, History	2017
Glims Farmstead Museum		Espoo	Agriculture, open-air museum	1958
Hallinportti Aviation Museum		Jämsä	Military aviation	1971
Helsinki University Museum		Helsinki	University museum	2003
Hotel and Restaurant Museum		Helsinki	Cuisine, tourism	1971
Huittinen Museum		Huittinen	History	1950
Jakobstad - Pietarsaari Museum		Jakobstad	History	1904
Jokioinen Museum Railway		Jokioinen	Heritage railway	1978
Karelia Aviation Museum		Lappeenranta	Military aviation	2000
Karhulan ilmailukerho Aviation Museum		Kotka	Aviation	1992
Lahti Ski Museum		Lahti	Winter sports	1959
Luostarinmäki		Turku	Open-air museum	1940
Maritime Museum of Finland		Kotka	Maritime	2008
Museum Masuuni Brunou		Juankoski	Industry	1991
Moomin Museum		Tampere	Art	1987
Museum for Motion Pictures		Helsinki	Film	2004
Nanoq		Jakobstad	Cultural history, open-air museum	1991
Parola Tank Museum		Hämeenlinna	Military	1961
Pukstaavi		Sastamala	Literature	2011
Päijänne Tavastia Aviation Museum		Asikkala	Military aviation	2006
Päivälehti Museum		Helsinki	Media, newspaper	2001
Qwensel House		Turku	Pharmacy	1958
Raahe Museum		Raahe	History	1862
Radio and TV Museum (Lahti, Finland)		Lahti	Media	1993
Rauma Maritime Museum		Rauma	Maritime	2004
Rauma Museum		Rauma	History	1891
RIISA- Orthodox Church Museum of Finland		Kuopio	Religion	1957
Rosenlew Museum		Pori	Industry	2006
Rupriikki Media Museum		Tampere	Media	2001
Salpa Line Museum		Miehikkälä	Military, open-air museum	1987
Savo Railway Museum		Pieksämäki	Railway	1989
Seurasaari		Helsinki	Open-air museum	1909
Spy Museum		Tampere	Espionage	1998
Tampere Lenin Museum		Tampere	History	1946
Turkansaari		Oulu	Open-air museum	1961
Uusikaupunki Automobile Museum		Uusikaupunki	Automotive museum	1984
Verla		Kouvola	Open-air museum, industry	1972
Åland Maritime Museum		Mariehamn	Maritime	1954
Åland Museum		Mariehamn	History, art	1963

=== Historic house museums ===
Name	Image	Location	Dedicated to	Established
Ahola		Järvenpää	Juhani Aho, Venny Soldan-Brofeldt	1997
Ainola		Järvenpää	Jean Sibelius	1974
Aleksis Kivi Memorial Cottage		Tuusula	Aleksis Kivi	1908
Birthplace of Jean Sibelius		Hämeenlinna	Jean Sibelius	1965
Burgher's House		Helsinki	Alexander Wickholm	1980
Halosenniemi		Tuusula	Pekka Halonen	1977
Hvitträsk		Kirkkonummi	Eliel Saarinen	1971
Imperial fishing lodge		Kotka	Alexander III of Russia	1933
Kalela		Ruovesi	Akseli Gallen-Kallela	1965
Lepikon torppa		Pielavesi	Urho Kekkonen	1966
Louhisaari Manor		Masku	Carl Gustaf Emil Mannerheim	1967
Mannerheim Museum		Helsinki	Carl Gustaf Emil Mannerheim	1951
Marela		Rauma	Gabriel Granlund	1979
Studio Aalto		Helsinki	Alvar Aalto	
Tamminiemi		Helsinki	Urho Kekkonen	1987
Tarvaspää		Espoo	Akseli Gallen-Kallela	1961
Villa Aalto		Helsinki	Alvar Aalto	1998
Villa Kokkonen		Järvenpää	Joonas Kokkonen	1998
Visavuori		Valkeakoski	Emil Wikström	1967

=== Science museums ===
Name	Image	Location	Type	Established
Science Centre Tietomaa		Oulu	Science	1988
Heureka Science Centre		Vantaa	Science	1989
