= Ari Poutiainen =

Finnish violinist, violist, composer, and researcher

Ari Poutiainen (born 1972 in Kaarlela, Finland) is a Finnish contemporary jazz violinist, violist, composer, and researcher. He is famous for employing a rare, hybrid 5-string viola (both acoustic and electric) beside violin, his main instrument. He often plucks either instrument with his fingers while holding it like a guitar. This instrumental approach enables him to produce unconventional chords and sounds on violin and viola.

== Musical career ==
Poutiainen gained his MA degree from the Sibelius Academy in 1999. His original, modern jazz style is also based on long studies abroad - in Denmark, France, Germany, Sweden, UK, and the United States. Beside his career as a performing jazz violist, he has been a successful composer and arranger. In Finland, he has led the groups called Soul Small Instruments, Another & Fast, NoneAlike, The String Thing, and Open Strings. His groups called Ardency, Farther-Out, and Jyjy are currently active. He is a central figure and soloist in the anarchistic marching band called Bad Ass Brass Band. Poutiainen has worked and performed, for example, in Benin (West Africa), France, Germany, Russia, and the United States.

Poutiainen gained his doctoral degree on jazz violin in 2009. His dissertation, Stringprovisation - A Fingering Strategy for Jazz Violin Improvisation, focuses on fingering, shifting, and position playing. These are fundamental subjects of left-hand violin technique. The study presents a unique fingering strategy that is targeted to formulaic modern jazz improvisation. This strategy excludes the use of open strings and instead relies on so-called schematic fingering. The particular advanced fingering approach reflects well the tactile and kinesthetic aspects of violin playing, and idiomatic patterns can be effectively performed with it in all keys and violin positions. Stringprovisation has been acknowledged as a groundbreaking achievement in the field of jazz violin improvisation technique, research, and pedagogy: It gained outstanding peer-reviews, for example, in The Strad (June 2011), Strings (January 2010), and Fiddler Magazine (Summer 2010).

As a pedagogue and researcher, Poutiainen has specialized in bowed string instrument improvisation, having taught the subject at different levels and institutions. He has also published several scholarly articles and given conference presentations on jazz violin history and improvisation. He currently teaches music education at the University of Helsinki (tenure position) and string improvisation at the Sibelius Academy.

== Selected discography ==
- Varaque: Planeettojen liikkeen on jatkuttava (2018)
- Sirkka Keiski & Valentino salonkiorkesteri: Kurjet saapuvat (2017)
- Janne: Is It My Time to Go (2015)
- Bad Ass Brass Band: Töttöröö! (2014)
- Susanne Paul's Move Quartet: El Camino (2013)
- Tuija Rantalainen and Trio Rouvat: Josafat (2012)
- Jukka Gustavson Organ Fusion Band with Strings: Root & Stalk & Flower Music (2012)
- Erik Lindström Awardees: Eric's Tunes (2011)
- Pastor & Poutiainen: North South Dial (2011)
- Balkan Fever Helsinki: Balkan Fever Helsinki (2011)
- Tuija Rantalainen: Vahtikoiran vapaapäivä (2010)
- The Bad Ass Brass Band: The Bad Ass Brass Band (2010)
- Levykauppa Äx: 20 Vappu-suosikkia/The Bad Ass Brass Band (2010)
- Farther-Out: Tuo (2009)
- Heinäsirkka: Heinis Goes Classics (2008)
- Montevideo: Come Clean (2006)
- Montevideo: Against the Grain (2006)
- The Groovy Eldorado Ensemble: Schokobananen/Groovy Eldorado (2006)
- Sue Van Doe: Elämä (2005)
- Teemu Raita: Kuuleeko maa? (2004)
- Max Savikangas: Extraterrestrial (2003)
- NoneAlike: More Than a Mirror (2003)
- Liisa Lux: Liisa Lux (2002)
- Nat Newborn and the Lounge Lions: Under the Umbrella (2001)
- Ultra Bra: Sinä päivänä kun synnyin (2001)
- B-Band: Hear the Truth (2000)
- Jyväskylän yliopiston sinfoniaorkesteri: T'an'go (1999)
- The Pansies: Solace (1999)
- Ultra Bra: Kroketti (1997)
- Ultra Bra: Sinä lähdit pois/Lähetystyö/Haikara (1997)

All listed in Tuhat.

== Selected film soundtracks ==
- Zaida Bergroth: Last Minute Shopping (2001) [i]
- Johanna Onnismaa: Guard (1999) [i]
- Mari Tolkkinen: Miss Hill (1998) [i]
- Juha Vanhanen: The Touch (1997)
- Pekka Lehtinen: Skin Deep (1997) [i]
- Teppo Räisänen: Castle in the Clouds (1997) [i]
- Sirkka Knall: In Lieu of Sister (1996) [i]
- Samu Heikkilä: Day of a Contract Killer (1996) [i]

Those indicated with [i] listed in Elonet.

== Selected theatre performance soundtracks ==
- Piia Pasi: Asphalt Sheep (2000)
- Anna Almhöjd: Våra torsdagar (1996)

== Selected contemporary dance performance soundtracks ==
- Trava Group: Gleis Novi Sad (2004)
- Mia Liski: Liski-Poutiainen Duo (1998)

== Selected publications ==
- Supplying Social Capital through Music Education: A Study on Interaction in Special Educational Needs Students’ Concerts (Kivijärvi, S. & Poutiainen, A., 2019, Research Studies in Music Education) [i]
- ImproStory: Social Improvisation and Storytelling in Arts and Skills Subjects in Teacher Education (Karppinen, S., Poutiainen, A., Kairavuori, S., Rusanen, S. & Komulainen, K., 2018, International Journal of Education and the Arts) [i]
- Jazzy Tunes and Dreamy Images in the Cold War Era: Launching Finnish Jazziskelmä On-screen (Kilpiö, K., Skaniakos, T. & Poutiainen, A., 2018, Svensk tidskrift för musikforskning) [i]
- Svend Asmussen 100 år (Orkesterjournalen, 2016) [i]
- Discursive Construction of African-American Identities and Spirituality: A Comparison of Muslim Hip Hop and 1960s Jazz Avant-Garde (Poutiainen, A. & Rantakallio, I., 2015, Popular Music and Society) [i]
- Jazz Curricula and Personal Voices (2014, Svenskt visarkiv) [i]
- Music for all for Music: A Study of the Resonaari Concert Audience and Equalized Interaction (Poutiainen, A., Kivijärvi, S. & Kaikkonen, M., 2013, Sense Publishers) [i]
- Jazz syntyy soittamalla: Käytännön ideoita rytmimusiikin ja improvisoinnin opiskeluun (2013, Musiikkikasvattaja: kohti reflektiivistä käytäntöä, 592-609) [i][FI]
- Regina Carter (2013, The Grove Dictionary of American Music) [i]
- Skemaattinen sormittaminen ja improvisoinnin perusteet viululla ja alttoviululla (2012, Suomen jousisoitinopettajat) [i][FI]
- Heavy Metal and Music Education (Poutiainen, A. & Lilja, E., 2012, Procedia - Social and Behavioral Sciences 45, 517-526) [i]
- Similar Slurring: Alternative Perspectives on Stéphane Grappelli's Legacy and Status (2012, Suomen musiikkitiede 100 v. juhlajulkaisu)
- Stay Creative! - Maintaining Individual Potential through Music Education (2012, Procedia - Social and Behavioral Sciences 45, 507-516) [i]
- Berlin Jazz Jam Sessions, Top 5 (2011, Mondo: Berliini) [i][FI]
- Chocolate Heart, Tin Covers: The Jazz-Pop Hit Song in Finland 1956-1963 (Poutiainen, A. & Kukkonen, R., 2011, Suomen Jazz & Pop Arkisto) [i][FI]
- Swinging Smoothly: The Elements of Jazz-Pop Hit Song (2011, article in above Chocolate Heart, Tin Covers) [i][FI]
- Musical Variables as a Foundation in an Improvised Performance (2011, The Embodiment of Authority) [i]
- Preparing a Musical Performance Including Improvisation (2011, The Embodiment of Authority) [i]
- From Innovation to Irrelevance : A Change of Perception to Research Object within a Practice-Based Doctoral Research Project (2010, CARPA I, 107-120) [i]
- À la Laila: Alkuperäiset levytykset 1957-1980 (2010, Jazz Perspectives, 4:2, 231-238) [i]
- Stringprovisation - A Fingering Strategy for Jazz Violin Improvisation (2009, Doctoral dissertation, published as vol. 28 in the Acta Musicologica Fennica series, The Finnish Musicological Society) [i]
- "Just Draw from Your Life..." - the Disappearing Myth of Originality in Jazz Music (2007, Musiikin suunta 3:18-26) [i][FI]
- Towards Eclecticism in Jazz Violin Education - Background Study on the Fingering Schemes Approach (2006, Finnish Journal of Music Education 9:51-56) [i]
- Berlin Jazz Jam Sessions, Top 5 (2006, Mondo: Berliini) [i][FI]
- Scale Fingerings in Jazz Violin Improvisation (2004, Musiikin suunta 4:58-63) [i][FI]
- How to Introduce Jazz in Public Music Schools? (2001, Mutes 1:32) [i][FI]
- Introducing the Modes and Modal Improvising: An Approach for Young Students of Classical Music (2001, Mutes 1:33-34) [i][FI]
- Brecker and Patterns: An Analysis of Michael Brecker's Melodic and Instrumental Devices (1999, Master of Music thesis)

Those indicated with [i] listed in Tuhat. All written in English, except those indicated with [FI] written in Finnish.

== Selected recent presentations ==
- Jazz Curricula and Personal Voices (2012, 10th Nordic Jazz Conference, Stockholm)
- Position Playing Technique and Jazz Violin Improvisation (2012, 16th Nordic Musicological Congress, Stockholm)
- Stay Creative! (2012, Design Learning, Helsinki)
- Heavy Metal and Music Education (with Esa Lilja, 2012 Design Learning, Helsinki)
- Classic Heavy Metal in Classrooms (with Esa Lilja, 2012, 16th Finnish Musicology Symposiumm, Jyväskylä)
- Stringprovisation: New Perspectives on Violin Technique (2011, Integrating Research and Performance Conference, Cork)
- Similar Slurring: Alternative Perspectives on Stéphane Grappelli's Legacy and Status (2011, 100 Years of Musicological Scholarship in Finland, Helsinki)
- Recent Research Results on Finnish Jazz-Pop Hit Song Era (2011, 100 Years of Musicological Scholarship in Finland, Helsinki)
- Silence Hidden by the Music: Tools of Teaching, Studying, and Performing Instrumental Group Improvisation (2010, The Embodiment of Authority: Perspectives on Performances, Helsinki)
- The Finnish Jazz-Pop Hit Song Revisited: Introducing and Discussing Results of the 'Suklaasydän, tinakuoret' Research Project (2010, The 9th Nordic Jazz Conference, Helsinki)
- Keeping That Discourse Alive: Re-establishing the School of Jazz Generations (2010, The 9th Nordic Jazz Conference, Helsinki)
- Jazz-Pop Hit in Pieces: A Definition of the Finnish Jazz-Pop Hit Song as a Dimension (2010, Musicology in the 3rd Millennium Symposium, Seinäjoki)
- From Innovation to Irrelevance: Changes of Perception to Research Object within a Practice-Based Doctoral Research Project (2009, Colloquium on Artistic Research in Performing Arts, Helsinki)
- John Coltrane’s Influence in Jean-Luc Ponty's Early Performance (2008, Studying Musical Performance Symposium, Helsinki)
- So Far or So Close? Discussing the Position of Violin in Jazz History (2007, De-Canonizing Music History Symposium, Helsinki)

All listed in Tuhat.
