= Sivakkajoki =

Sivakkajoki may refer to:

- Sivakkajoki, Finland, location of Kivimaa mine
- Sivakkajoki (river), a river in Sweden
