= National Audiovisual Institute =

Organisations named National Audiovisual Institute exist in several countries:

- National Audiovisual Institute (Finland)
- Institut national de l'audiovisuel (INA) (France)
- National Audiovisual Institute (Poland) (NInA)
