= Kemi-Tornio sub-region =

Coordinates: 65.8014°N 24.5444°E

Kemi-Tornio sub-region Kemi–Tornion seutukunta
- Sub-region
- Country: Finland
- Region: Lapland

Population (2011)
  - Total: 60,614
- Time zone: UTC+2 (EET)
  - Summer (DST): UTC+3 (EEST)

Kemi-Tornio sub-region is a subdivision of Finnish Lapland and, since 2009, one of the sub-regions of Finland. It spans the area of Sea Lapland, an unofficial region characterized by river deltas and a lot of industry.

== Municipalities ==
Coat of arms	Municipality
Kemin vaakuna	Kemi (city)
Keminmaan vaakuna	Keminmaa (municipality)
Simon vaakuna	Simo (municipality)
Tervolan vaakuna	Tervola (municipality)
Tornion vaakuna	Tornio (city)
