= Museum of History and Future =

Planned museum in Turku, Finland

The Museum of History and Future (Finnish: Historian ja tulevaisuuden museo) is a museum planned for Turku, which will open to the public in its entirety in 2030. The purpose of the interactive and experiential museum is to present the history of both Finland and Turku and to combine the different characteristics of museums, science centers and theme parks.

== Details ==
The idea for a new history museum was born in 2011, when Turku was the European capital of culture. The Turku City Council made a decision to implement the museum in April 2017 as part of Finland's 100th anniversary year. The Turku City Council decided on three alternative locations, which are still being prepared in June 2018. In May 2019, the Turku City Council chose the renovated Linnaniemi area as the location for the museum.

The museum will be built in stages next to Turku Castle and Forum Marinum, in the vicinity of Aurajoki and the port of Turku. Construction work can begin in the Linnanniemi area in 2026, as the area has been leased until then. The price estimate for the museum building according to the price level of 2022 is around 39 million euros. The estimate does not include the realizations and furniture of the exhibition. The project is financed with Turku 2029 foundation funds. In addition, at least according to the 2019 data, an investment grant could be applied for from the Ministry of Education and Culture. The area of the new museum building is tentatively planned to be approximately 7,000 square meters.

According to the plans, the museum will present at least the history of Turku and its built environment, the Great Fire of Turku and the history of the Aura River (Finland). In addition, the entire history of Finland would be told through the history of Turku, because many things first happened in Turku. The visitor target is planned to be around 200,000 visitors per year, which would put the destination at the top of Turku's museums.
