= Máximo Laura =

Peruvian tapestry weaver (born 18 November 1959)

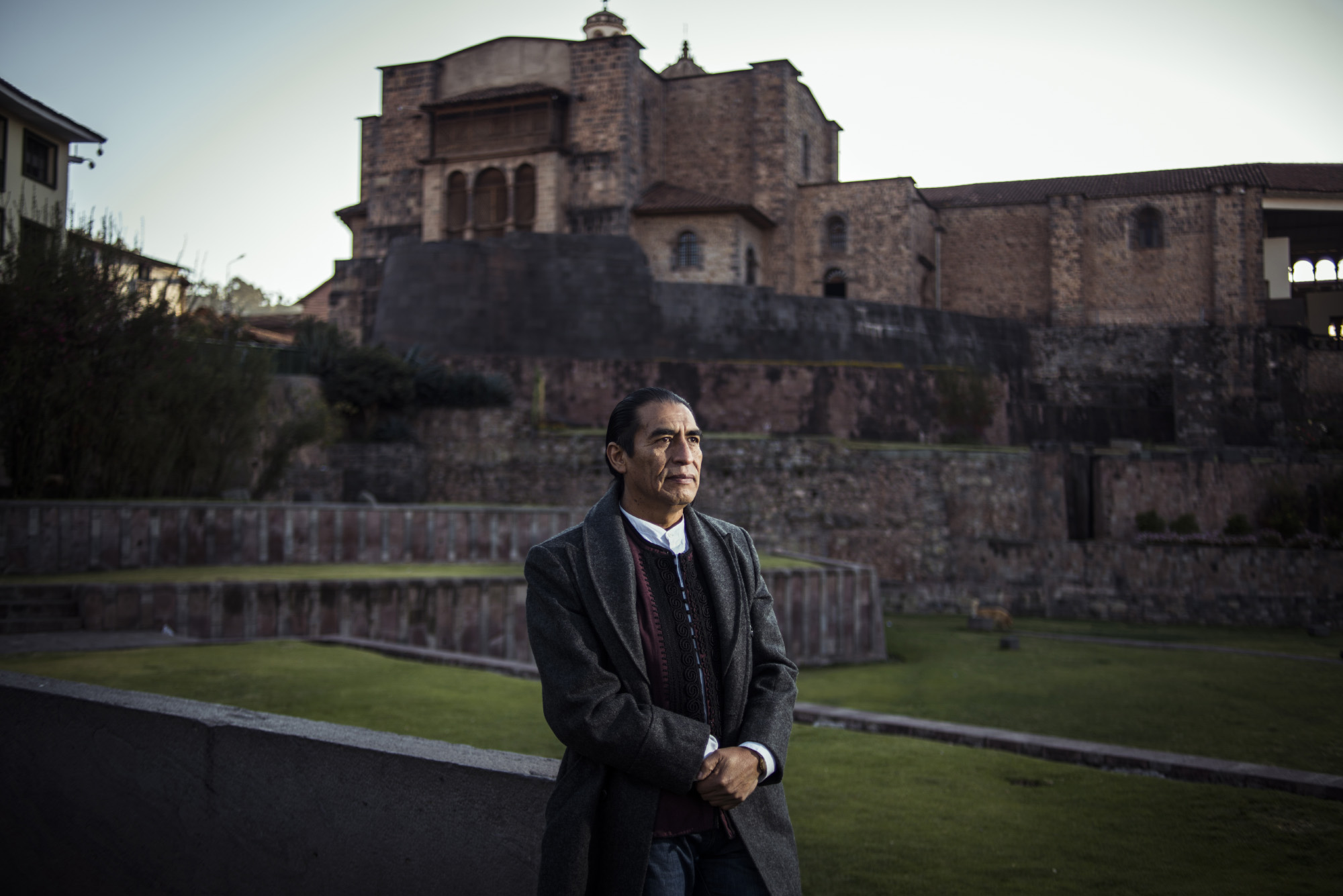
Máximo Laura Máximo Laura, Cusco, Peru. 2015
- Born: Máximo Laura Taboada; 18 November 1959; Ayacucho, Peru
- Education: National University of San Marcos; Escuela Nacional de Bellas Artes, Ayacucho, Peru
- Known for: Tapestry, textile arts, textiles
- Awards: National Living Human Treasure of Peru, by Banco de la Nación and UNESCO, 2010

Máximo Laura Taboada (born 18 November 1959 in Ayacucho) is a Peruvian tapestry weaver, recognized as one of South America's most unique textile artists. He is also known for starting the contemporary tapestry movement in Peru.

== Early life ==
Laura was born in Ayacucho, Peru. Laura is the fifth generation of weavers that learned his craft as a child at the side of his father while growing up in Ayacucho. He learned his art by never silencing the internal self-exploration or the external exploration of the world, including a lifelong study of art history and literature beyond the borders of Perú.

As a young man in his 20s, Máximo sold his tapestries to pay for his studies in literature. However, his love of tapestry took over and he devoted himself to his art.

== Studies ==
Laura studied literature at the National University of San Marcos and also studied at the National School of Fine Arts in Ayacucho. He is also self-educated and continues to learn and study at his studio in Lima, Peru.

== Career ==
=== Early works ===
His early works began at the start of the 1980s. They were geometric designs and their themes were principally recreations of iconography, mythology and symbolism of ancestral Andean civilizations.

He then began adding vibrant colors and forms to the pre-Columbian heritage designs and iconography to make them more contemporary, while still maintaining the spirit of the message. At that time, this was considered very avant-garde.

At the start of the 1990s his work started to get more recognition. And in 1992 one of his works won the UNESCO prize for all of Latin America and Caribbean organized in Spain. This opened many opportunities for him to exhibit in many other countries.

=== Current works ===
His current designs contain traditional Andean iconographies alongside his own interpretation of the Andean civilizations and their beliefs. His use of vibrant colors, negative space and innovative weaving techniques make his tapestries very unique.

=== Studio and workshop ===
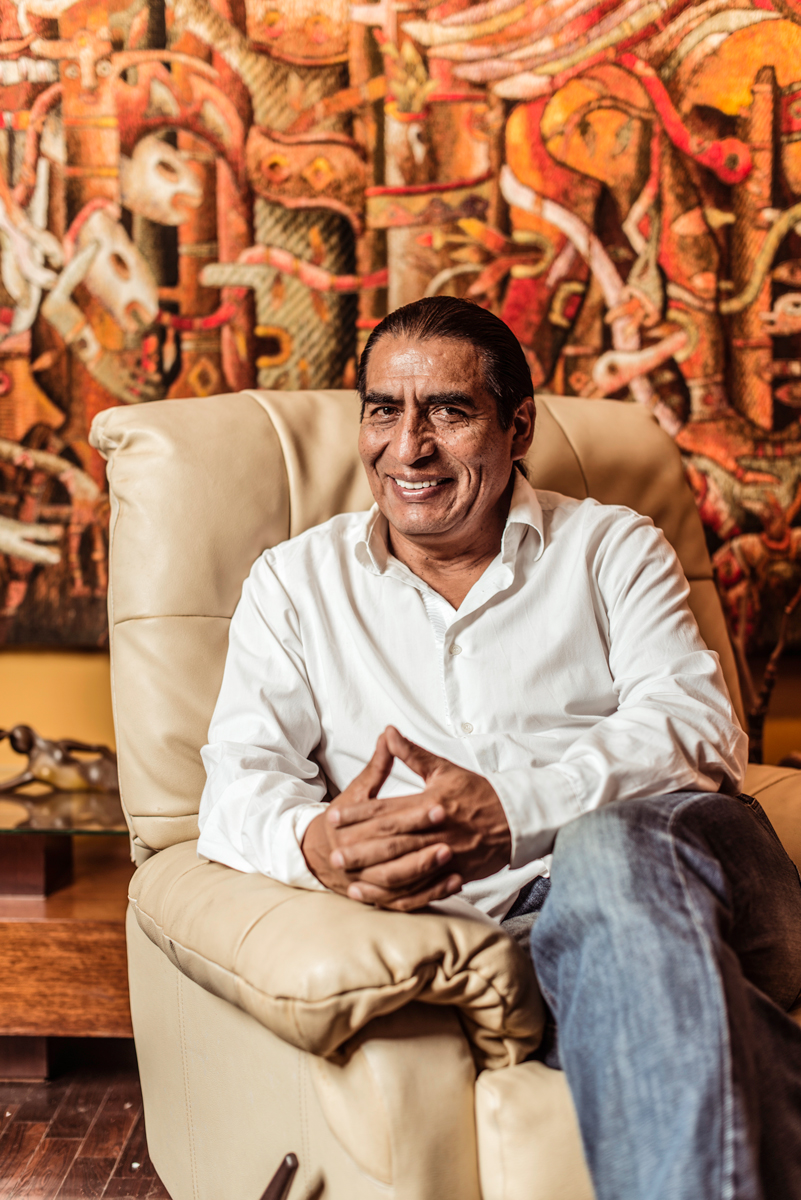
Máximo Laura in his studio

Laura now has a studio and workshop in Lima, Peru, where he works alongside the team of weavers he has created along the years. He uses the studio to study, create new designs and prepare everything prior to the weaving process. Then at the workshop he and his team of weavers create the finalized designs using horizontal looms.

=== Museo Máximo Laura ===
In 2013 Laura founded his museum, Museo Máximo Laura (MML) located in the historic center of Cusco, declared "Cultural Heritage of Humanity" by UNESCO in 1983.

The MML hosts a permanent exhibition of 42 tapestries, some of which have won awards worldwide. It also has a gallery shop where you can purchase some of his works and souvenirs.

The MML shares its collection with institutions, textile centers, weavers and textile artists interested in studying and/or researching Laura's techniques and works. In addition, MML collaborates with art communities by offering educational programs such as internships and an artist residency program.

== Inspiration and Influences ==
Laura draws from many sources of inspiration, such as the Chavin culture which is expressive and totemic; the Paracas culture which is colorful and strong; the Nazca culture and the Wari culture for their geometric forms; and the Chancay culture from its sobriety and linear spirit.

All of the symbolisms, abstractions and stylization found in all this pre inca cultures have influenced his creativity and own style.

He has had other influences from Jean Lurçat, Olga de Amaral, Sheila Hicks, Fernando de Szyszlo.

== Collections and Awards ==
=== Collections ===
- National Museum of Peruvian Culture, Lima, PERU
- Smithsonian's National Museum of American History, Washington DC, US
- The World Bank, Washington DC, US
- The World Heritage Center (UNESCO), Paris, FRANCE
- Iberoamerican Museum of Craft, Puerto La Cruz, VENEZUELA
- Museum of the Americas, Miami, US
- Craft Museum of Finland, Jyvaskyla, FINLAND
- Museum of Iberoamerican Crafts, La Orotava, Tenerife, SPAIN
- The Latvian National Museum of Art, Riga, LATVIA
- Palacio de Torre Tagle, Ministry of Foreign Affairs of Peru, Lima, PERU
- World Textile Art Organization, Miami, US
- Museum of Art and Popular Traditions of Riva Agüero Institute, Lima, PERU
- Andean Institute of Folk Arts Andrés Bello, Quito, ECUADOR
- Ministry of Industry, Tourism, Integration and International Trade Negotiations, Lima, PERU
- Embassy of Peru – Washington DC, US
- Embassy of Peru, Quito, ECUADOR
- Embassy of Peru, Asunción, PARAGUAY
- Embassy of Peru, Helsinki, FINLAND
- Former President of Latvia Ms Vaira Vike-Freiberga, LATVIA

=== Awards ===
- National Living Human Treasure of Peru, by Banco de la Nación and UNESCO, 2010, PERU
- Award for Excellence, WTA – VI International Biennial of Contemporary Textile Art, MEXICO
- Outstanding Award, "From Lausanne to Beijing" 6th International Fiber art Biennale, CHINA
- Special Prize, 4th Riga International Textile and Fibre Art Triennial Tradition & Innovation, LATVIA
- Honorary Mention Award, 13th International Triennial of Tapestry, POLAND
- Mention Prize, 5th International Biennial of Textile Art, ARGENTINA
- Bronze Prize, "From Lausanne to Beijing" 5th International Fiber art Biennale, CHINA
- II Award – Silver Medal, Scythia 7th International Biennial Exhibition on Textile Art, UKRAINE
- HGA Award in recognition of an outstanding work, Handweavers Guild of America, US
- People's Choice Award, Land: the Tapestry Foundation of Victoria Award Exhibition, AUSTRALIA
- "Best in Show" Contemporary Latin American Art 8 organized by the Art Museum of the Americas, US
- 1st Place Award, Small Expressions 2009, US
- "Grand National Prize Amautas of Peruvian Handicraft", Government of Peru, PERU
- 1st National Craft Prize "Golden Hands", PERU
