= Hotel and Restaurant Museum =

Museum in Kaapelitehdas, Helsinki, Finland

Coordinates: 60.1619°N 24.9057°E

The Hotel and Restaurant Museum
- Hotelli- ja ravintolamuseo
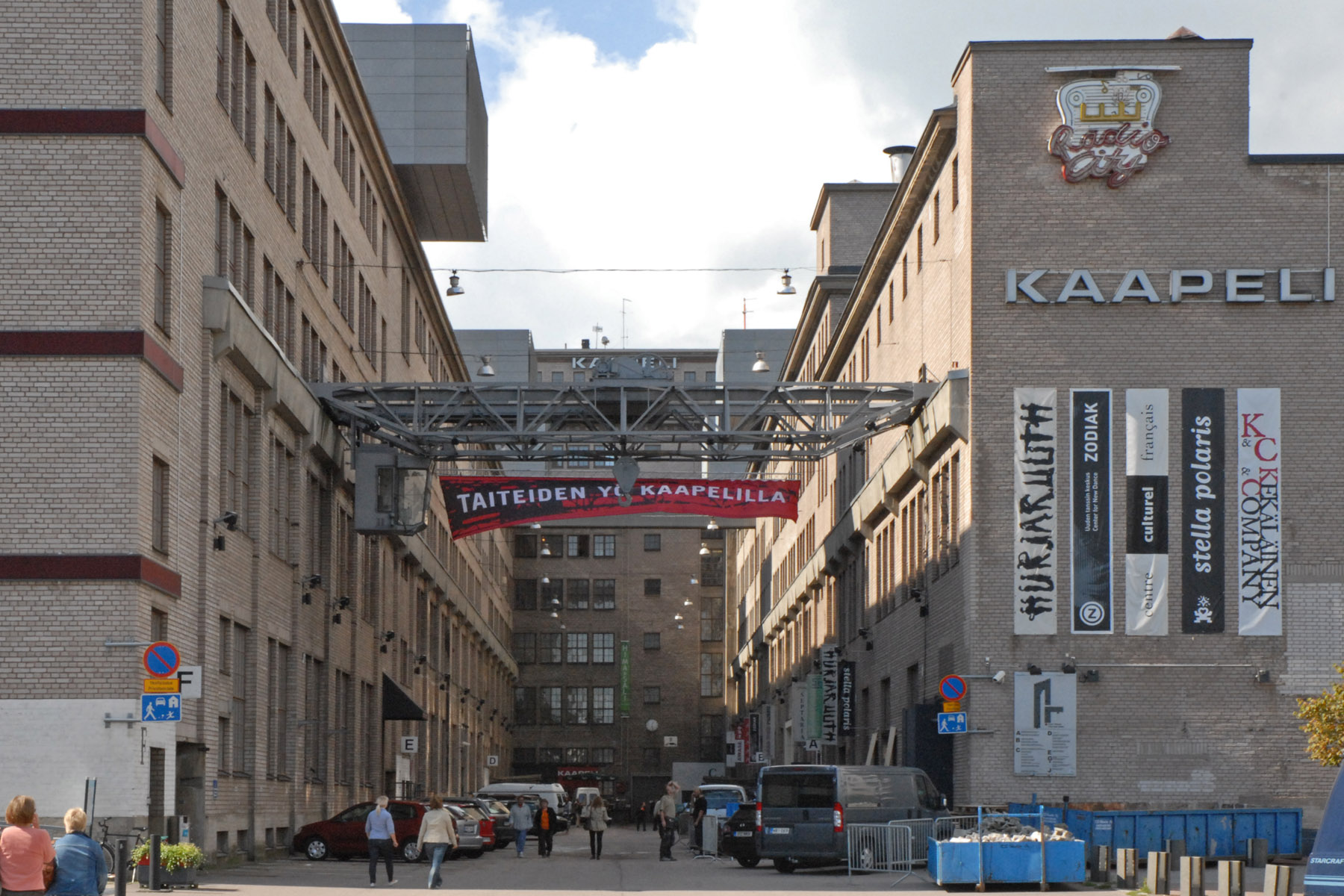
- Location: Kaapelitehdas, Helsinki, Finland
- Director: Anni Pelkonen
- Owners: Hotel and Restaurant Museum Foundation
- Public transit access: Local and regional bus routes, Subway
- Website: www.hotellijaravintolamuseo.fi

The Hotel and Restaurant Museum (Finnish: Hotelli- ja ravintolamuseo) specializes in the history of Finnish hotels, restaurants, cafés, tourism and culinary culture. The museum has been located in Kaapelitehdas, Helsinki, Finland since 1993. Since the museum's opening in 1971, it has grown in scope: the museum was originally aimed towards hotel and restaurant students, but it now serves a wide range of audiences. The Hotel and Restaurant Museum aims to highlight the shared cultural heritage and social significance of food and drink culture in Finland. The museum's collection includes artifacts from restaurants, bars, diners, spas and hotels. These artifacts encompass a variety items like photographs, menus and other documents.

The Hotel and Restaurant Museum is staffed by Anni Pelkonen, the director, as well as two curators, a museum lecturer, and a number of freelance guides.

== Attendance ==
The record number of visitors was set in 2024, at 18,867 visitors. Of those, 12,614 were paid visits and the rest were free visits (e.g., school visits). Admission to the museum is free on the last Wednesday of every month.

== Exhibitions ==
The permanent Hotel and Restaurant Museum exhibition displays Finnish food and drink culture: it demonstrates the history of tourism in Finland and explores the world of restaurant and hotel staff. There is also a permanent exhibition exploring the history of Alko. Past exhibitions include:

- January 2020 to May 2021: Wish You Were Beer
- January 2022 to January 2023: Tuesday Dinner - A Food Trip to the Seventies
- January 2023 to January 2024: FOOD TATTOO
- January 2024 to September 2024: Food Made in Factories

Notably, the photographs used in the FOOD TATTOO exhibition were taken by Finnish photographer Meeri Koutaniemi.

== See also ==
- List of museums in Finland
