= Gustaf Wilhelm Finnberg =

Finnish painter (1784–1833)

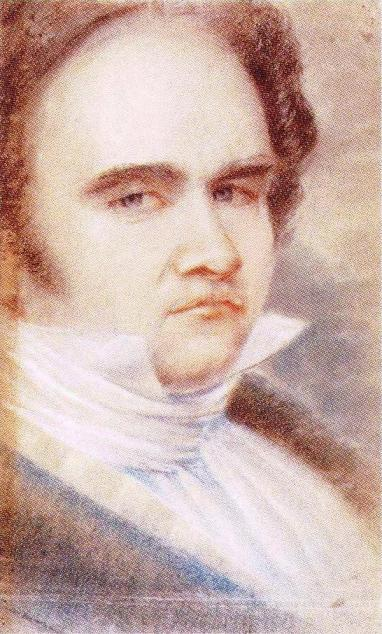
- Self-Portrait, c. 1814
- Born: 21 November 1784; Pargas, Sweden (now Finland)
- Died: 28 June 1833 (aged 48); Stockholm, Sweden
- Known for: Painting

Gustaf Wilhelm Finnberg (21 November 1784 – 28 June 1833) was a Finnish painter.

== Biography ==
Finnberg was born in Pargas to sailor Johan Finnberg and Sophia Stenroos. In 1800 he left for Turku to apprentice as a painter there, and in 1805 he graduated as a journeyman painter, with his graduation work being a portrait of a man drawn with red chalk. He spent the years 1806 he left to Stockholm to study at the Royal Swedish Academy of Arts. From the recommendation of Louis Masreliez he was immediately accepted to the higher courses. Although he had success in his studies, he never officially graduated. After 1814 he is no longer in the registry of students, although in 1815 he still took part in a students' contest for the topic Alexander visits Diogenes and won first prize. While his primary interest was historical paintings, he made his living through painting portraits. He also executed some miniatures and landscape works. He possibly faced more difficulties after the 1809 Finnish War, now being a Russian citizen. When his father died 2 October 1820 he returned to Finland and set up his own atelier in Turku. The painter Robert Wilhelm Ekman and perhaps also Magnus von Wright studied under Finnberg in the 1820s.

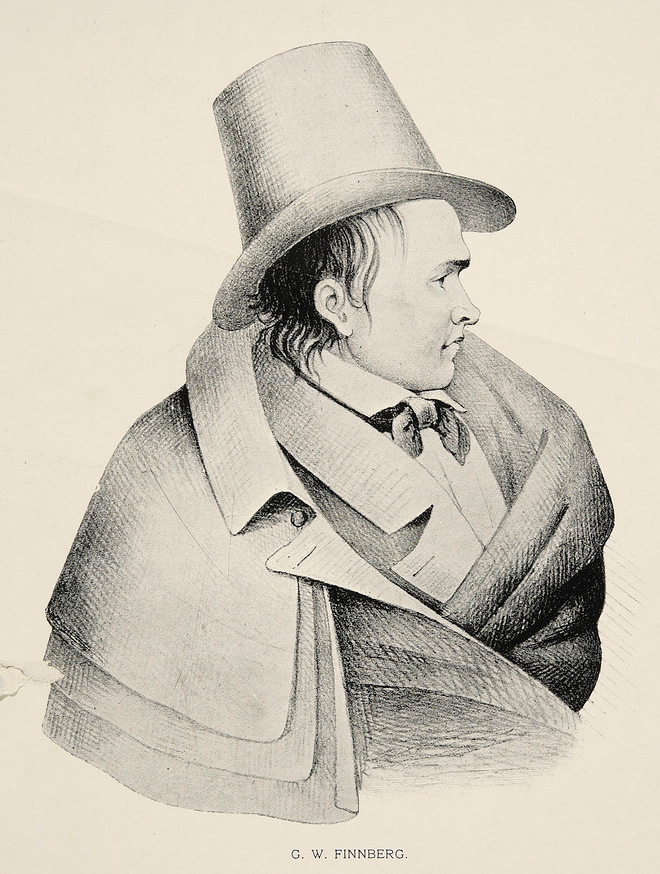
Portrait of Finnberg by Robert Wilhelm Ekman, 1820–1833

His atelier and many of his works were destroyed by the 1827 Great Fire of Turku, which greatly affected Finnberg's life and career. His most famous painting is likely the 1827 After the Great Fire of Turku. He left Turku and moved to Stockholm soon afterwards. Other than some works inspired by the fire, Finnberg struggled to make a living as an artist until his death on 28 June 1833.

== Works ==
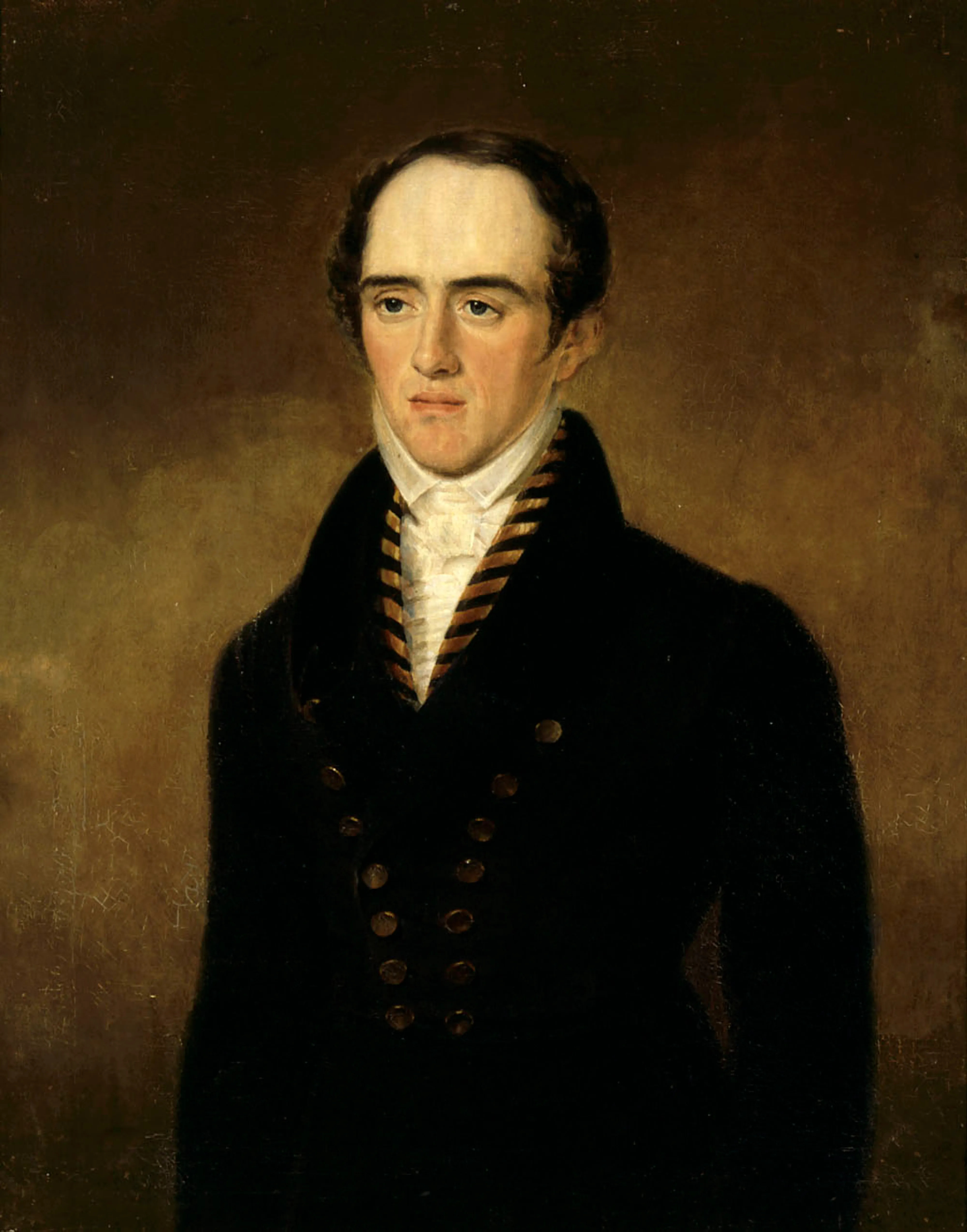
Carl Gustaf Mannerheim, 1823–1825

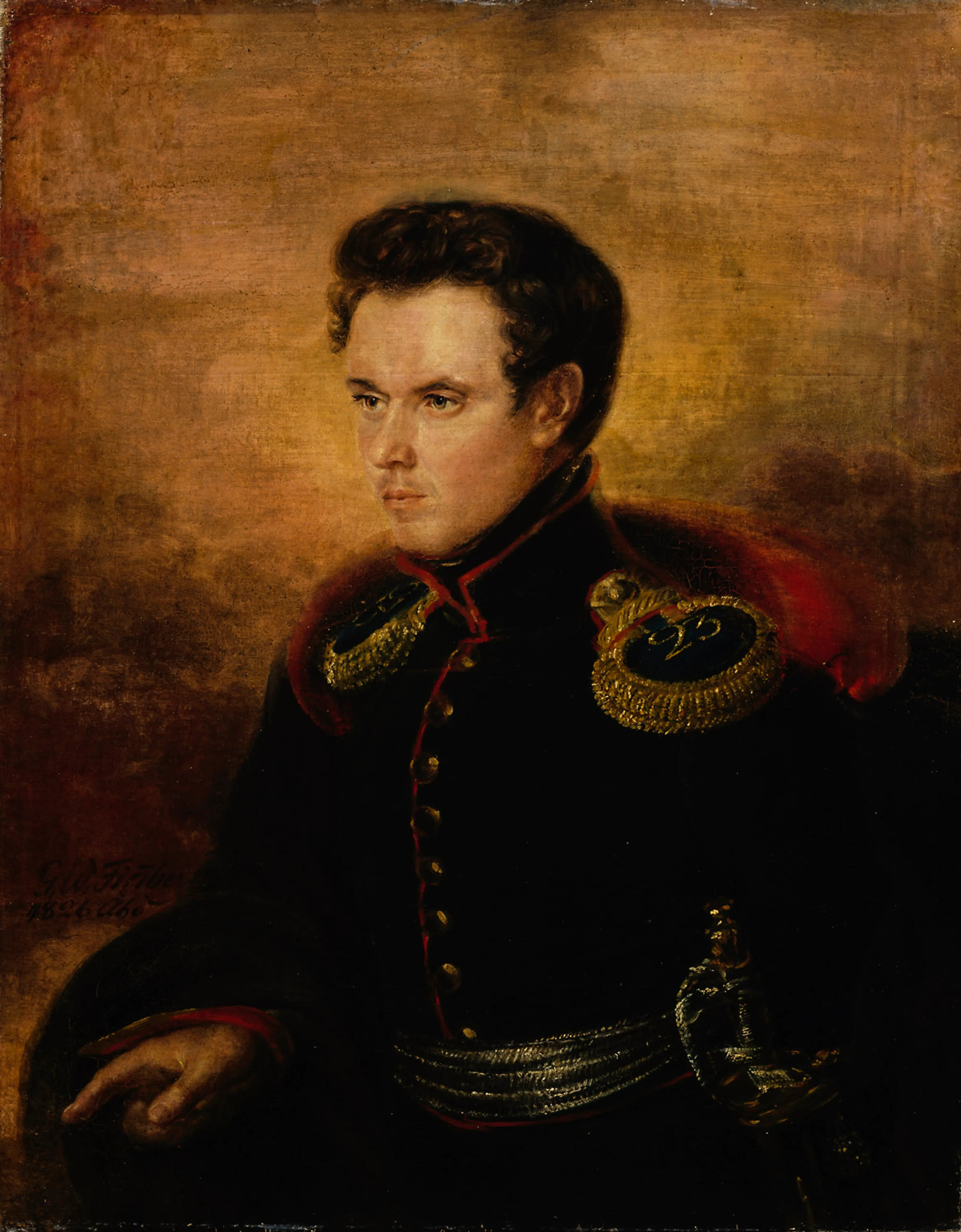
Sublieutenant Anton af Tengström, 1826, born in 1798 he died in the Russo-Turkish war in 1828

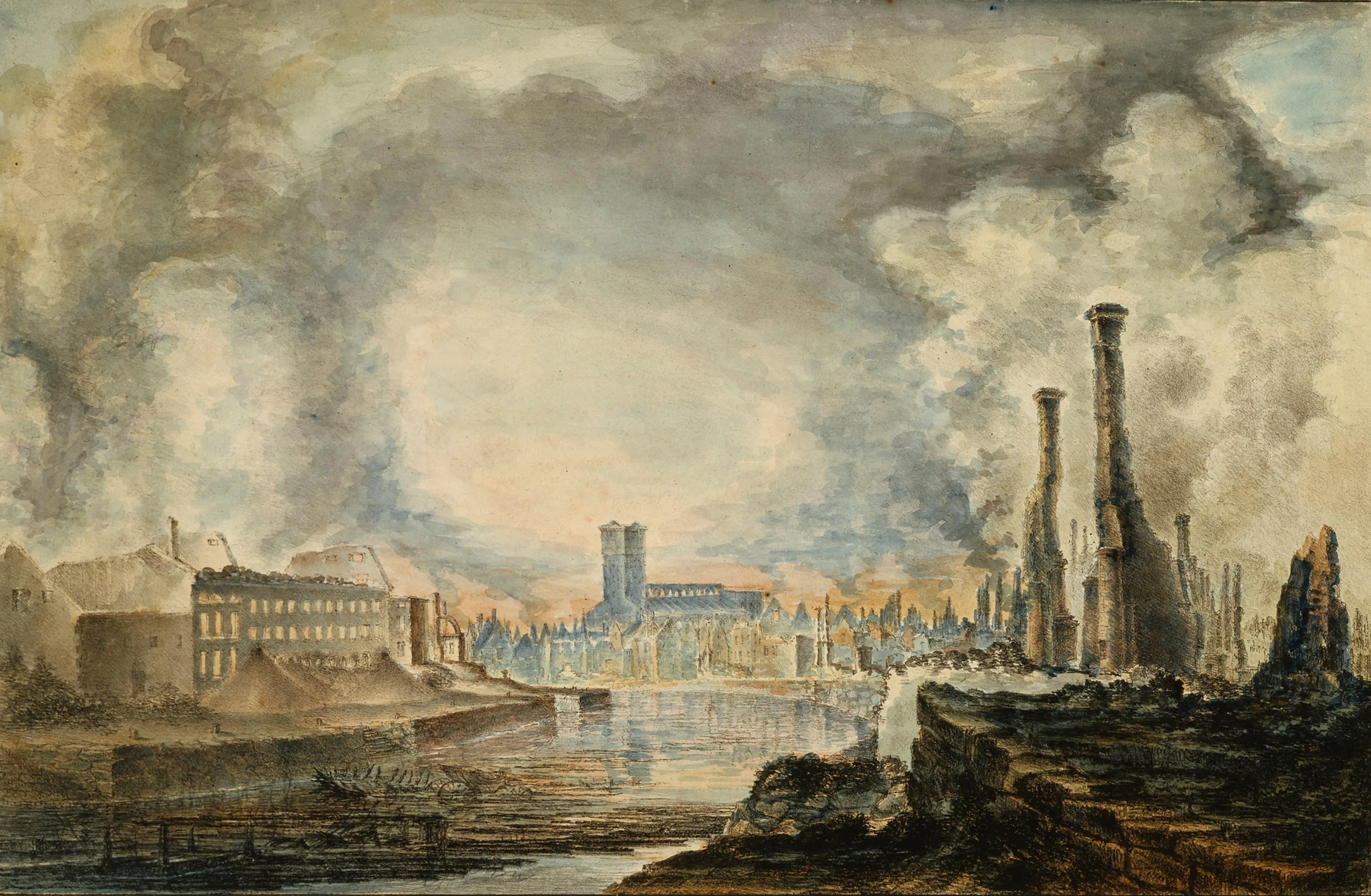
After the Great Fire of Turku, 1827

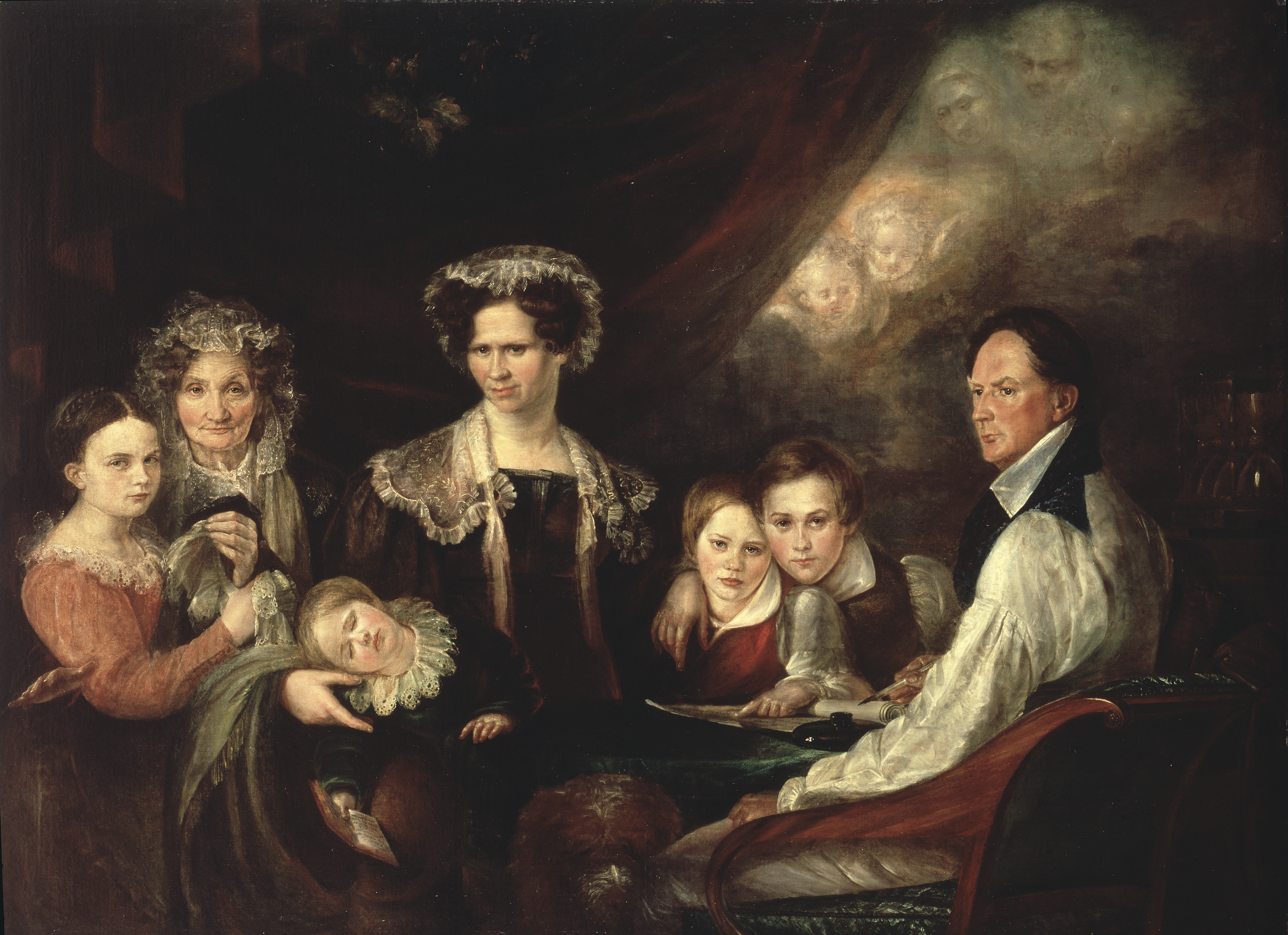
C.J. Lagercrantz, Assessor, and his Family, c. 1830

== See also ==
- Finnish art

== Media ==
- Porträttmålaren Gustaf Wilhelm Finnberg och hans tid 1784–1833. Movie by Göran Gunér. DVD, Athenafilm.
