= Kaapelitehdas =

Cultural centre in Helsinki, Finland

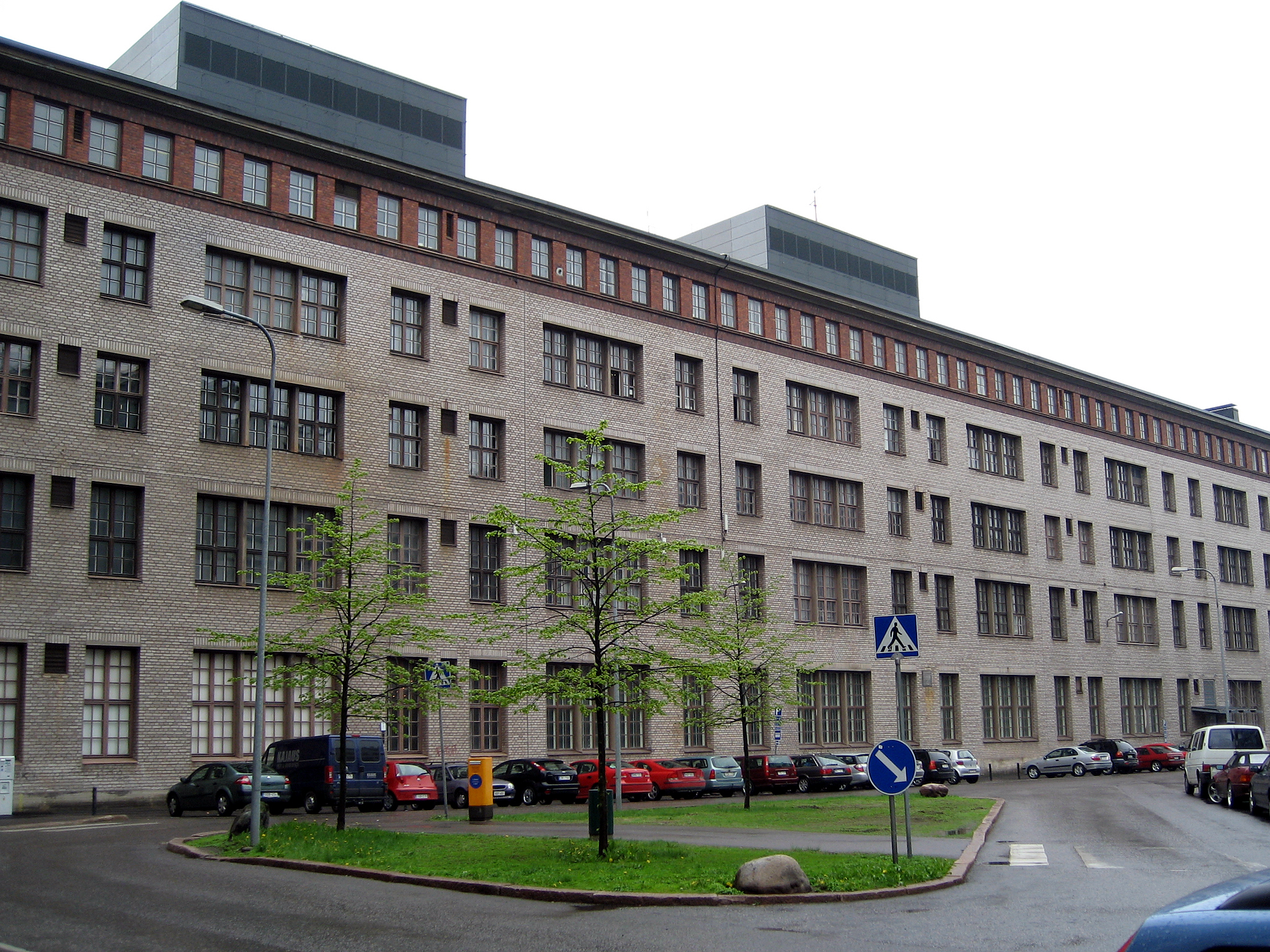
- Kaapelitehdas on a rainy spring afternoon.

- Location within Helsinki Location within Finland
- Alternative names: Kabelfabriken

General information
- Status: Cultural centre
- Type: Factory
- Location: Salmisaari, Tallberginkatu 1 C 15, Helsinki, Finland
- Coordinates: 60.162°N 24.904°E
- Completed: 1943
- Opened: 1939
- Owner: Kiinteistö Oy Kaapelitalo

Technical details
- Floor area: 53,000 square metres

Design and construction
- Architect: W. G. Palmqvist

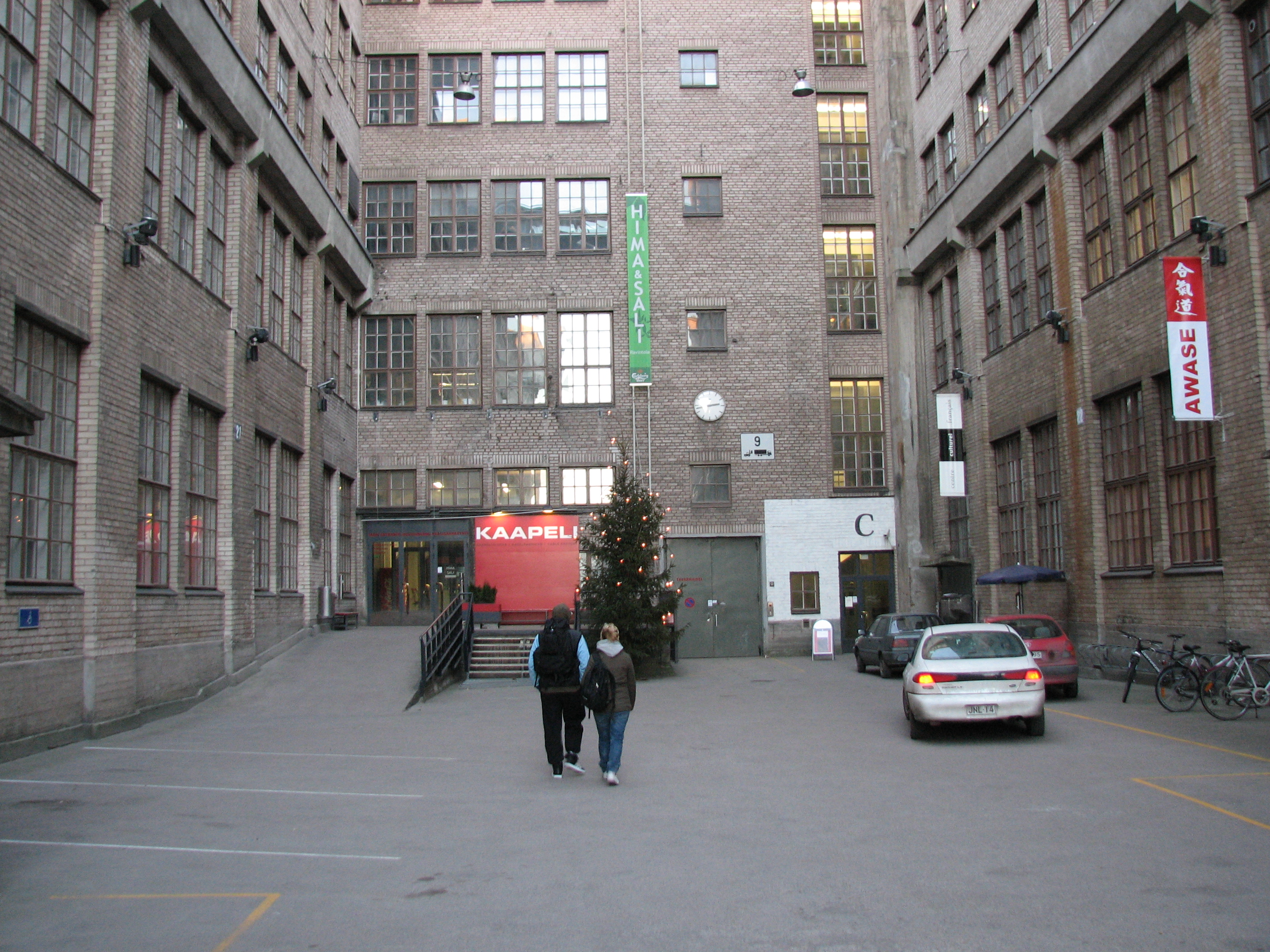
Inside the Kaapelitehdas courtyard.

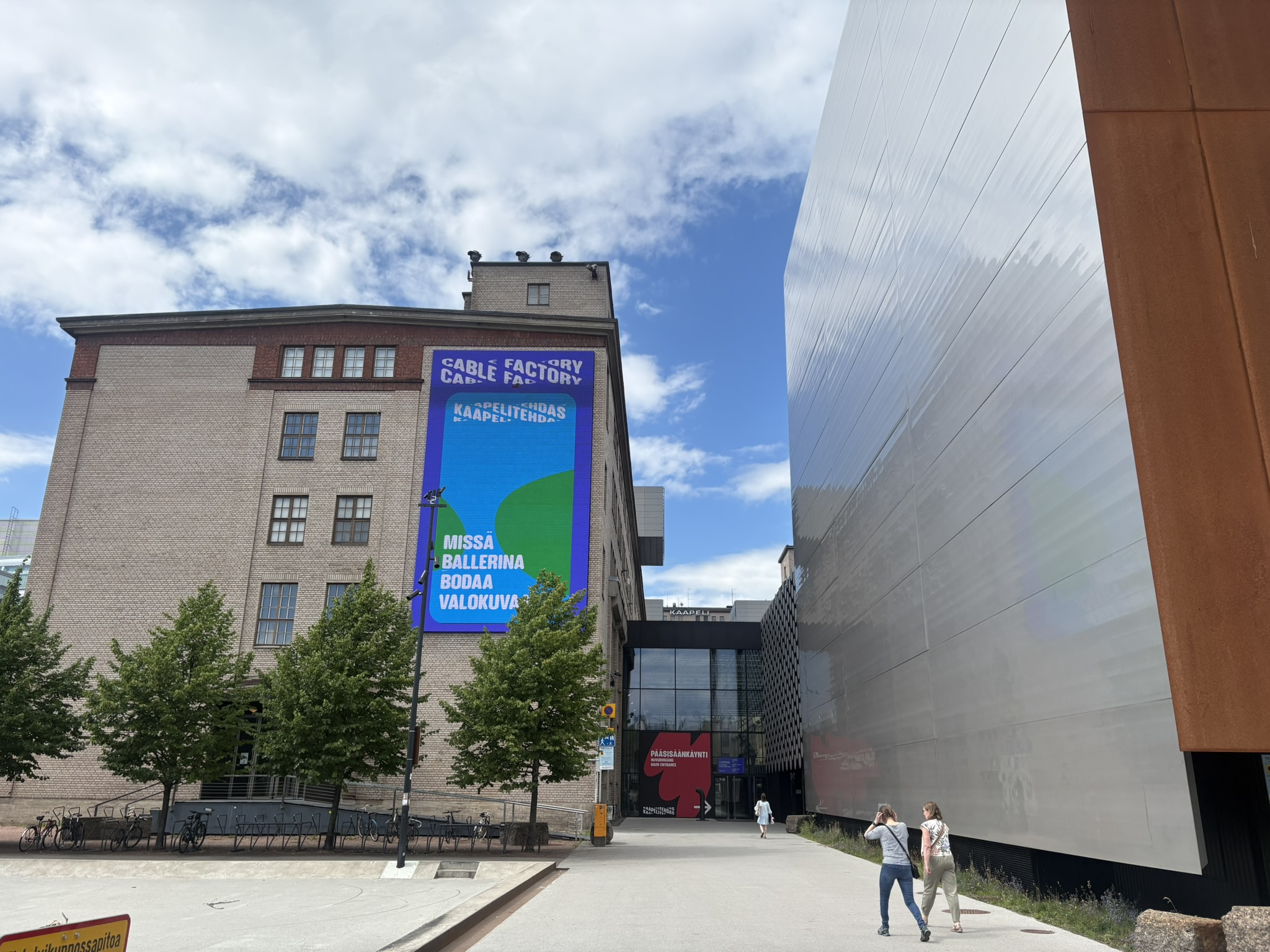
The entrance to Kaapelitehdas

Kaapelitehdas (Finnish for "the Cable Factory", also called simply Kaapeli, Swedish: Kabelfabriken) is a famous building in Salmisaari, Helsinki, near the Lauttasaari bridge. It was redeveloped from its industrial use into a cultural centre which hosts artists studios, three museums, activities and events.

== History ==
The building was originally constructed as a cable factory in 1939–1954 for Suomen Kaapelitehdas Oy (Finnish Cable Works), hence the name. Cable manufacturing started in 1943 and was discontinued in 1987.

Suomen Kaapelitehdas was acquired by Suomen Gummitehdas Oy (Finnish Rubber Works) in 1922. Suomen Gummitehdas was renamed Suomen Kumitehdas in 1959, and the companies Suomen Kumitehdas, Nokia Aktiebolag and Suomen Kaapelitehdas were merged in 1966–1967 to form Oy Nokia Ab (Nokia Corporation).

== Cultural centre ==
The building was acquired by the city of Helsinki and converted into a cultural centre, where various private and public organisations are based and can hold events large and small, concerts, exhibitions, fairs and festivals. There are also artist studios and the rent from the studios made the project financially viable. As of 2005, the turnover was 3.5 million euros.

Kaapelitehdas is the home of three museums – Finnish Museum of Photography, Theatre Museum and Hotel and Restaurant Museum. It also provides space for galleries, dance theatres, ateliers, art schools, rehearsing studios, radio stations and a popular restaurant named Hima & Sali.

The company Kiinteistö Oy Kaapelitalo is responsible for developing, renting and maintaining the facilities. Kiinteistö Oy Kaapelitalo is owned by the City of Helsinki. Since 1 January 2008, the company has also managed an old gasworks in the eastern part of the city center. Renovation and renting of the Suvilahti will take years.

Kaapelitehdas is a member of the Trans Europe Halles (TEH) network of independent cultural centres in Europe. The TEH Communication and Administration Office was set up there in 2003.

== See also ==
- Andrejsala
- NDSM
