= Luostarinmäki =

Open-air museum in Turku, Finland

Coordinates: 60°26′49″N 22°16′39″E

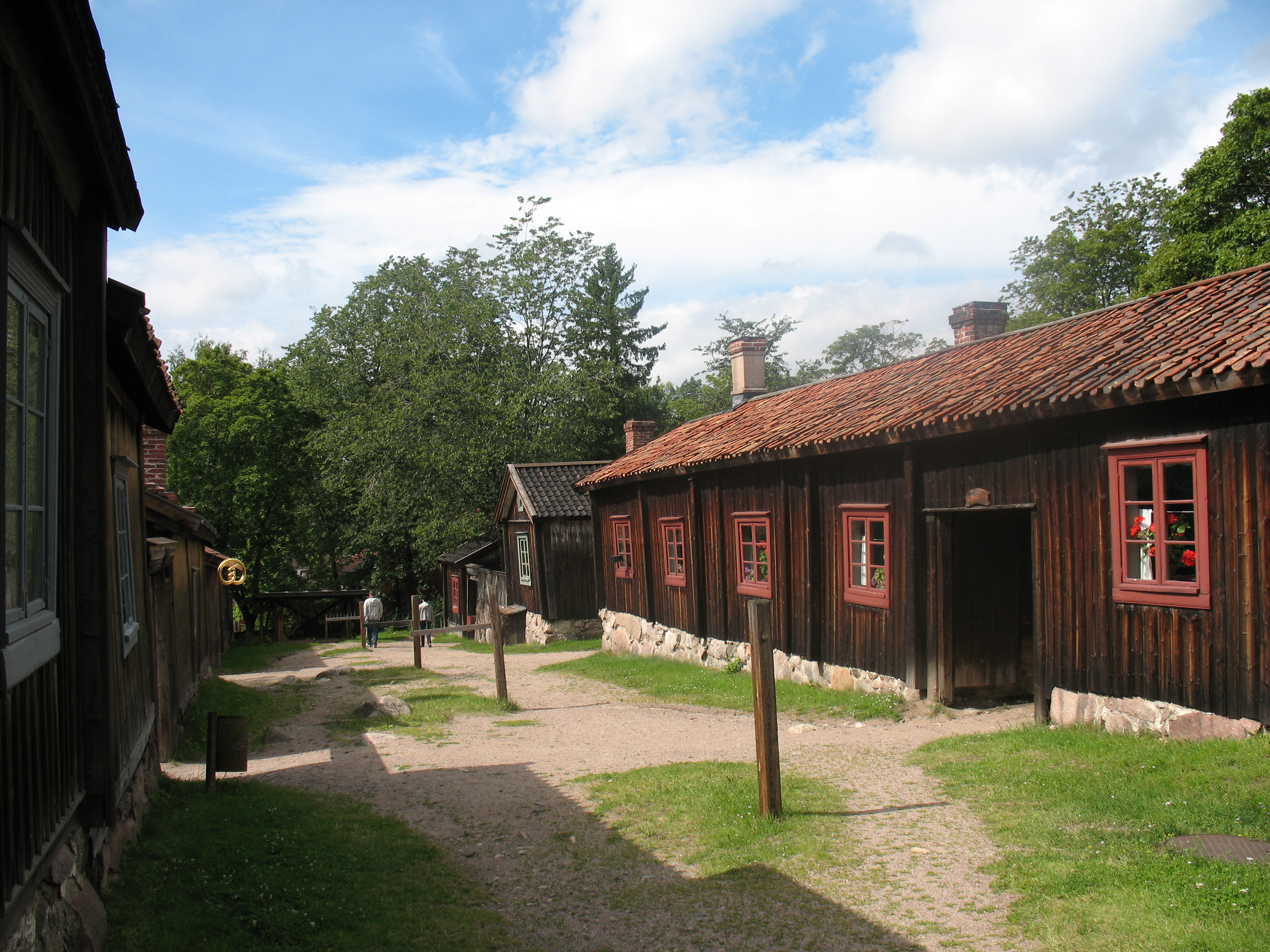
Luostarinmäki Handicrafts Museum

Luostarinmäki Handicrafts Museum (Finnish: Luostarinmäen käsityöläismuseo, Swedish: Hantverksmuseet på Klosterbacken; Cloister Hill Handicrafts Museum) is an open-air museum in Turku (Swedish: Åbo), Finland.

== Cloister Hill ==
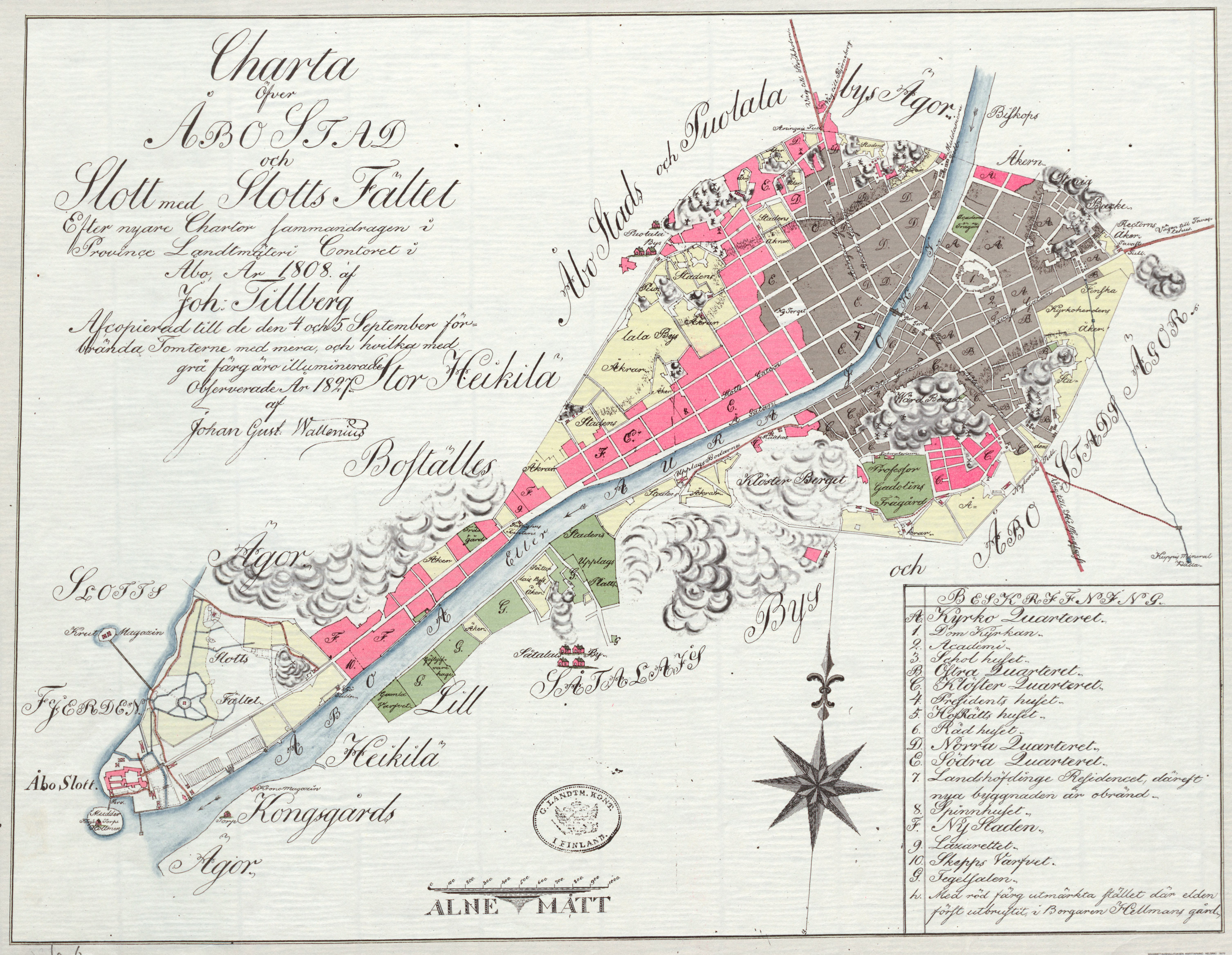
Map of Turku after the 1827 fire. Destroyed areas are in grey. The surviving area, now the museum, is the red section to the South East

This area of Cloister Hill was developed relatively late for pre-fire Turku, from around 1775, after another fire. It was decided that the previously undeveloped, although not uninhabited, area to the south of Vartiovuori Hill would be developed as residential accommodation. The South of this area was less rocky and easier to build upon, so was developed first. Plots were surveyed officially, then the plot holder would develop within that plot as and when they saw fit. These first surveyed plots still form the boundaries within the current museum. Three plots: 158–160 appear on the maps of 1780, by 1800 171, 176, 178–189 are included and the 1808 map (the basis of the post-fire map illustrated) includes the whole extent of the museum site.

The original occupations of the first inhabitants are represented by the buildings now within the museum. Some were building trades, such as carpenters and a stonemason, and probably built their own properties. The plot would be fenced in and a simple cottage with a stove and baking oven built. Other buildings might be provided for domestic animals. In time, the buildings would expand around the perimeter of the plot, enclosing a courtyard.

== The museum ==
The museum consists of 18 blocks of original 18th-century – early 19th-century buildings on their original location. The area of the museum was the only old residential area left in 1940, when the museum was opened. The location was the largest area to completely survive the Great Fire of Turku.

The idea for the museum was put forward in a local newspaper article as early as 1908, after the oldest part of Cloister Hill had been demolished – now the street of Sirkkalankatu. The idea was rejected for nearly 30 years, until the city's new museum committee was convinced to create a museum in the style of Den Gamle By, an earlier museum in Aarhus, Denmark. Nine blocks formed the original museum, the others being added in 1956. Expansion has continued since, with more buildings having their interiors refitted for display. On their addition to the museum, the houses were still decorated in the contemporary fashion of the 1930s. They were carefully recorded, then the interiors refitted to the style of the Great Fire period. This often involved removing ceilings of tongue and groove boards, or the restoration of open fireplaces. Some residents remained living in the museum area even after it opened, the last, Hilma Mäenpää, remaining there until her death in 1982.

The museum received the Golden Apple international tourism award as the only site in Scandinavia in 1984.

== See also ==
- Qwensel House, the apothecary museum in Turku
