= Kivimaa mine =

Mine in Tervola, Lapland, Finland

Coordinates: 66°12′55.3″N 24°49′0.9″E

Kivimaa mine (Finnish: Kivimaan kaivos) was gold and copper mine active during the years 1969–1970 in Tervola at Sivakkajoki. During this time 18 587 tonnes of ore were extracted which contained 2.0 grams of gold per tonne. The concentration of copper in the ore was 1.20%. Outokumpu Ltd., which owned the mine, mined the quartz-carbonate veins with highest concentration of gold and copper. The ore from the mine was transported to the mine of Vihanti to be enriched. The mining ended on 12 December 1969. The buildings at the mine were taken down in the summer of 1974.

== Sources ==
- GTK tietoaineisto : Precious metal mines (in Finnish)
- The documents of Outokumpu Ltd. related to the mine (Finnish and English)
