= Elävän kuvan museo =

Museum in Helsinki, Finland

Coordinates: 60.190524°N 24.976730°E

Elävän kuvan museo (Museum for Motion Pictures) was a museum dedicated to Finnish film culture located in Helsinki, Finland. The museum was operated by the National Audiovisual Institute.

The institute's museum collections, which include over 10,000 objects, consist primarily of items related to film making from the 1930s to the present day, including filming and laboratory equipment, projectors, props, costumes, theatre tickets and film posters. The collection also includes material from the pre-cinema era, such as magic lanterns.

The museum was located at Vanha talvitie 9 in Helsinki. Its dedicated exhibition space at that location was open from 2004 to June 2015.
