= North Karelian Museum =

Coordinates: 62.5997°N 29.7617°E

- Pohjois-Karjalan museo
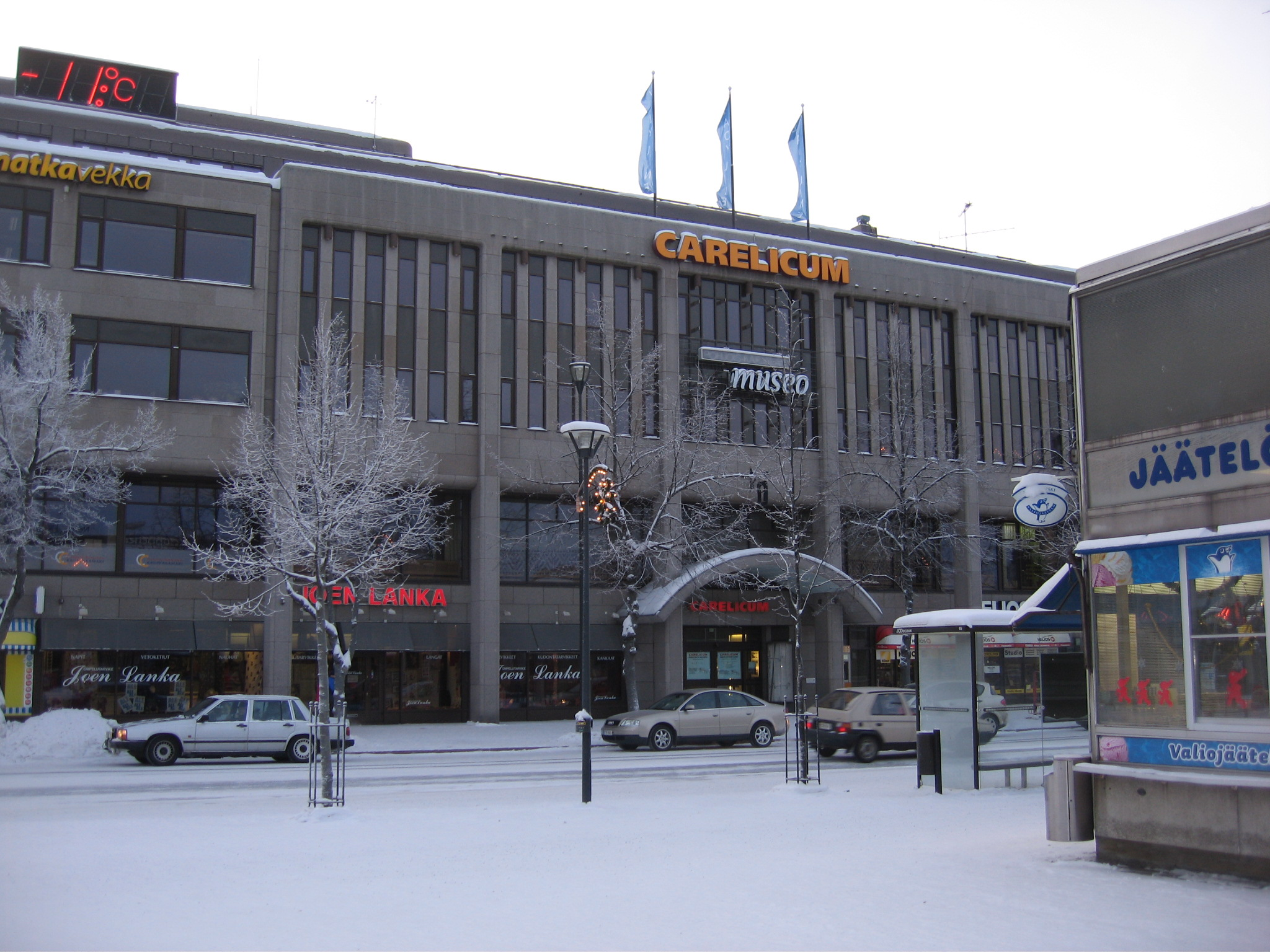
- Museum by Joensuu market place
- Established: 1917
- Type: Provincial museum
- Director: Tarja Raninen–Siiskonen
- Owner: City of Joensuu
- Website: www.joensuu.fi/pohjoiskarjalanmuseo

The North Karelian Museum (Finnish: Pohjois-Karjalan museo) is a museum of cultural history. This provincial museum focuses on the city of Joensuu and its surrounding Karelia region. The museum has a permanent exhibition about the history of Karelia and several changing exhibitions during the year. Special section is dedicated for children.

The museum was founded in 1917. In the beginning it was located in back room of the public library. In 1980 the small town museum was established as a provincial museum and got full-time staff, due to which it became much more active. In 2011 the museum opened in its current premises in the Carelicum culture centre, designed by architect Martti Aittapelto.

The main themes of the permanent exhibition are Karelian history and folklore.
