= National Audiovisual Institute (Finland) =

Governmental bureau under the Finnish Ministry of Education

- Kansallinen audiovisuaalinen instituutti

Agency overview
- Formed: 2014; 12 years ago
- Preceding agencies: National Audiovisual Archive; Finnish Centre for Media Education and Audiovisual Media
- Jurisdiction: Finnish Government
- Headquarters: Kaikukatu 2c, 00530 Helsinki
- Agency executive: Riitta Vanhatalo, Director
- Parent department: Ministry of Education and Culture

The National Audiovisual Institute (Finnish: Kansallinen audiovisuaalinen instituutti; Swedish: Nationella audiovisuella institutet or KAVI) is a governmental bureau under the Finnish Ministry of Education responsible for supervising the distribution of audiovisual content (including video games), advancing media education in Finland and archiving audiovisual material. The agency is tasked with maintaining and developing an online content rating system, training independent classifiers and supervising their operation.

The agency was formed in 2014 as a result of a merger between the National Audiovisual Archive (formerly Finnish Film Archive, established 1957) and the Finnish Board of Film Classification and its short-lived successor Centre for Media Education and Audiovisual Media (2012–2014).

The National Audiovisual Institute organizes regular archival film screenings at the Kino Regina cinema, located since 2019 in the Helsinki Central Library Oodi.

== Classification system ==
Identifiers of Finland (KAVI)
| Identifier | Minimum age | Reference | Definition |
|---|---|---|---|
| S | All ages | Suitable for all audiences. | |
| 7 | 7 years or more | Suitable for people over 7 years old. | Children between 4-6 years old must be accompanied by an adult. |
| 12 | 12 years or older | Suitable for people over 12 years old. | Children between 9-11 years of age must be accompanied by an adult. |
| 16 | 16 years or older | Suitable for people over 16 years old. | Children between 13-15 years of age must be accompanied by an adult. |
| 18 | 18 years old or older | Restricted to people over 18 years old. | Only those over 18 years old. |

== See also ==
- Elävän kuvan museo
- Elonet
- Television content rating systems § Finland
- Watershed (broadcasting) § Finland
