= Rauma Maritime Museum =

Museum in Rauma, Finland

Coordinates: 61°08′N 021°30′E

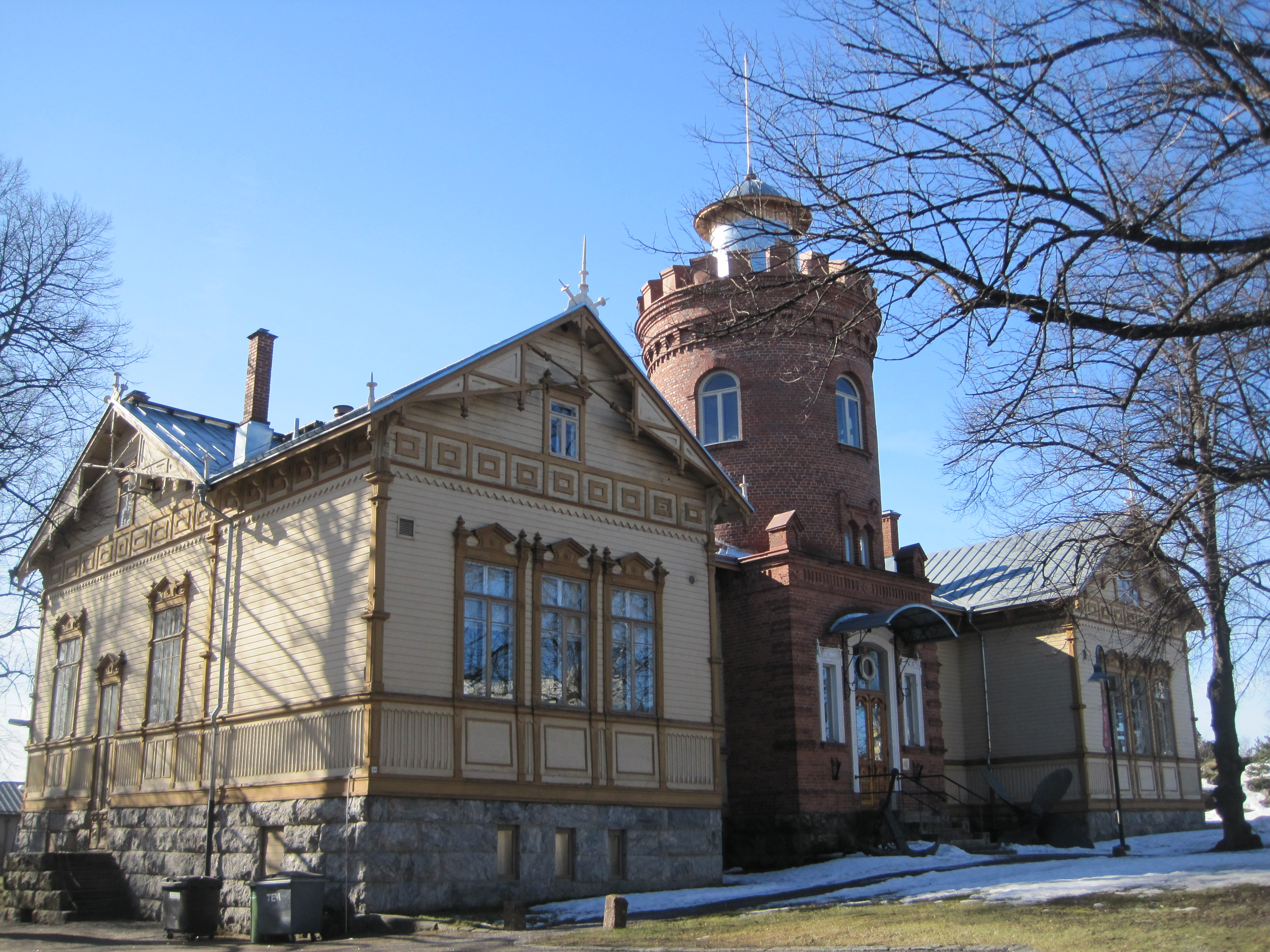
Rauma Maritime Museum

Rauma Maritime Museum (Finnish: Rauman merimuseo) is a museum in Rauma, Finland held by Rauma Maritime Museum Foundation. The museum opened in the former Maritime School in 2004.
