= Elonet =

Finnish online film database and streaming service

- Website type: Film database and streaming service
- Available in: Finnish
- Owner: Finnish National Audiovisual Institute
- Website: elonet.finna.fi
- Commercial: No
- Launched: 2006
- Current status: Active

Old logo of Elonet

Elonet is a website run by the Finnish National Audiovisual Institute which provides a database of about 150,000 films created or screened in Finland. It was launched in 2006. In 2024, the National Audiovisual Institute launched the free streaming service Elonet+. The service can be accessed via a web browser, and it also has a mobile app for Android and iOS devices and a TV app for Apple TV. As of January 2024, the service has about 450 Finnish feature films and thousands of TV programs, advertising films, documentary films and short films available.
