= Ostrobothnian Museum =

Coordinates: 63.0994°N 21.6018°E

- Pohjanmaan museo
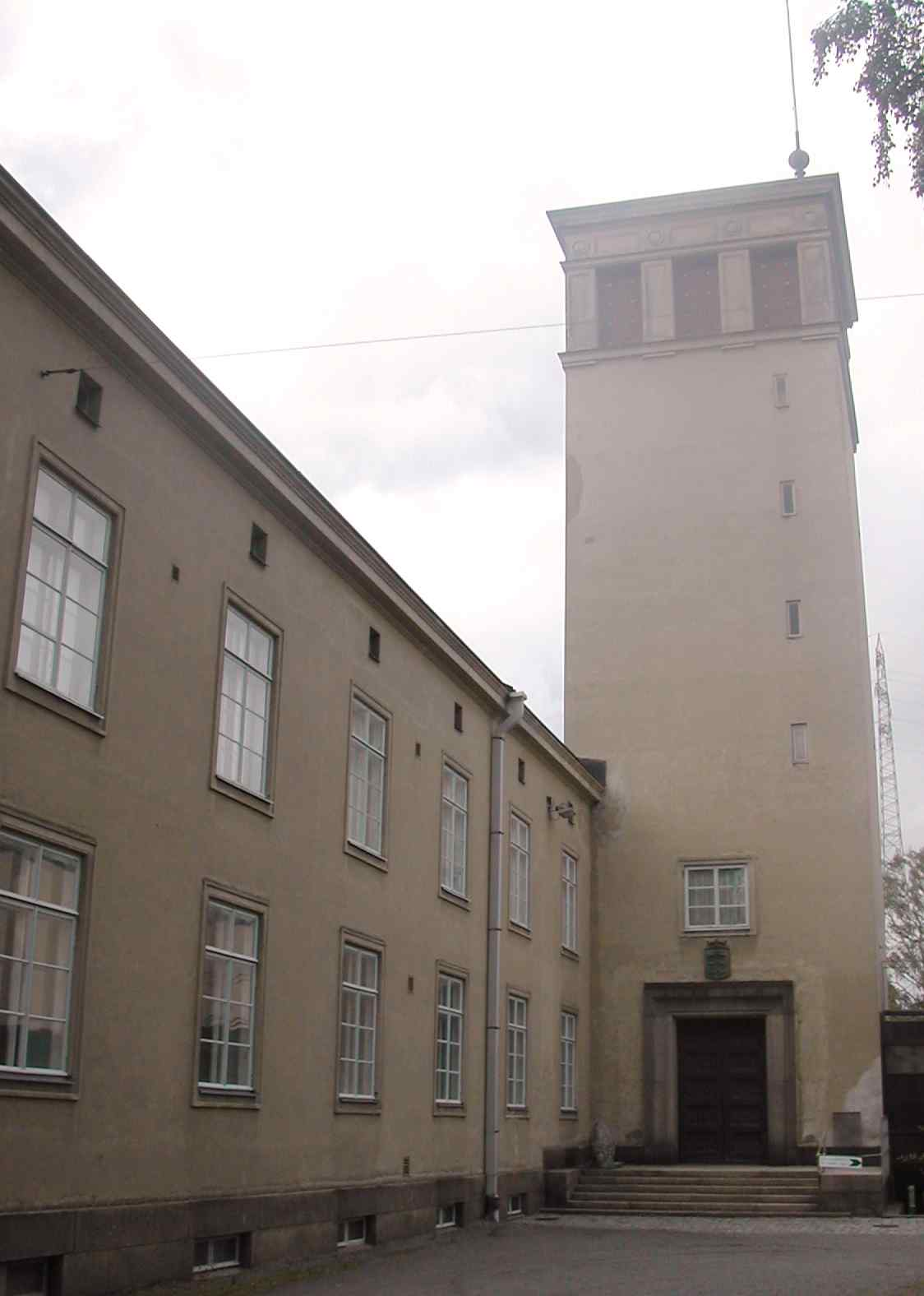
- Established: 1896
- Location: Museonkatu 3. Vaasa
- Type: Provincial museum Art museum
- Owner: City of Vaasa
- Website: www.pohjanmaanmuseo.fi

The Ostrobothnian Museum (Finnish: Pohjanmaan museo) is a provincial museum of cultural history, which also serves as provincial art museum and a museum of natural science. The museum building, designed by Eino Forsman in 1927, and the museum’s exhibition wing, planned by architect Erik Kråkström in 1967 are located next to the Marianpuisto park in central Vaasa.

A medical doctor from Vaasa, Karl Hedman (1864-1931) was active in creation of the museum. The building was constructed in 1930, and the Hedmans had their own home and collection on one floor. They had no children, and left their collection to fund, which later donated it to the city.
