= Kirpilä Art Collection =

Art museum in Helsinki, Finland

Coordinates: 60°10′39″N 24°55′36″E

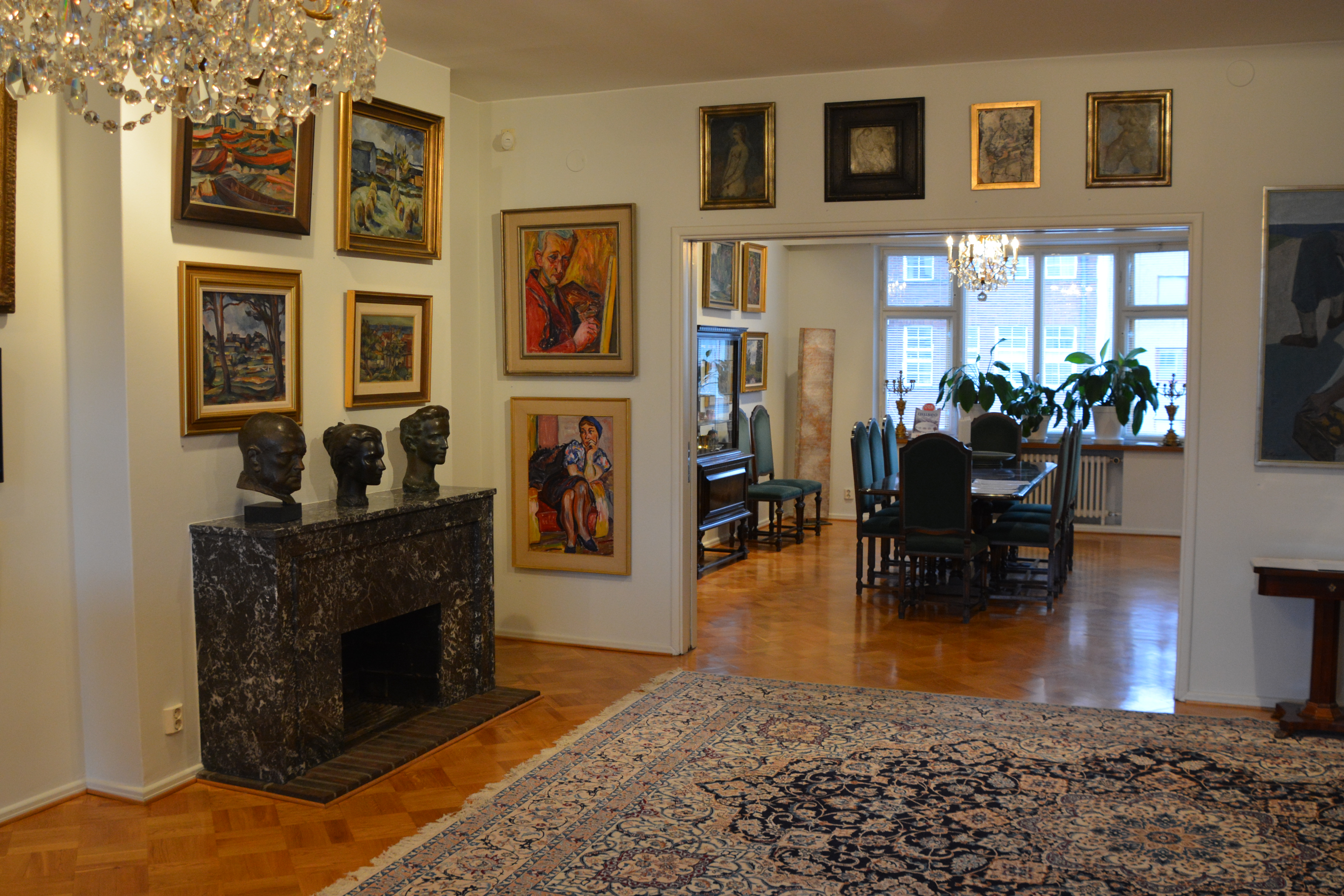
Kirpilä Art Collection

The Kirpilä Art Collection (Finnish: Taidekoti Kirpilä, Swedish: Konsthemmet Kirpilä) is an art museum in Helsinki.

The museum contains the art collection of medical doctor Juhani Kirpilä (1931–1988) and is located in his former home, an apartment in Helsinki. It opened in 1992 and contains Finnish art from the 19th century to the 1970s. Among the artists represented in the collection are Akseli Gallen-Kallela, Ellen Thesleff, Eero Nelimarkka, Åke Mattas, Wäinö Aaltonen and Kain Tapper. The museum is owned and maintained by the Finnish Cultural Foundation.
