= Sea Lapland =

Kemi–Tornio coastal region

Sea Lapland location

Sea Lapland (Finnish: Meri-Lappi) is located in the southwestern part of Finnish Lapland.

Three rivers, the Simojoki, Kemijoki and Tornionjoki, all flowing down to the Gulf of Bothnia, are situated in the region along with their deltas. Tornio is also called TornioHaparanda together with the neighbouring Swedish border city of Haparanda. The population of the area is around 60 000 inhabitants.

Industry, trade, seafaring, agriculture and tourism are important means of livelihood in Sea Lapland. Known sights are for example The Snowcastle in Kemi, Icebreaker Sampo and the Kukkolankoski village.

== Municipalities ==
=== Current municipalities ===
Kemin vaakuna	Kemi (city)
Keminmaan vaakuna	Keminmaa
Simon vaakuna	Simo
Tervolan vaakuna	Tervola
Tornion vaakuna	Tornio (city)

=== Former municipalities ===
Both municipalities were ceded to the city of Tornio.

Alatornion vaakuna	Alatornio (until 1973)
Karungin vaakuna	Karunki (until 1973)

== Gallery ==
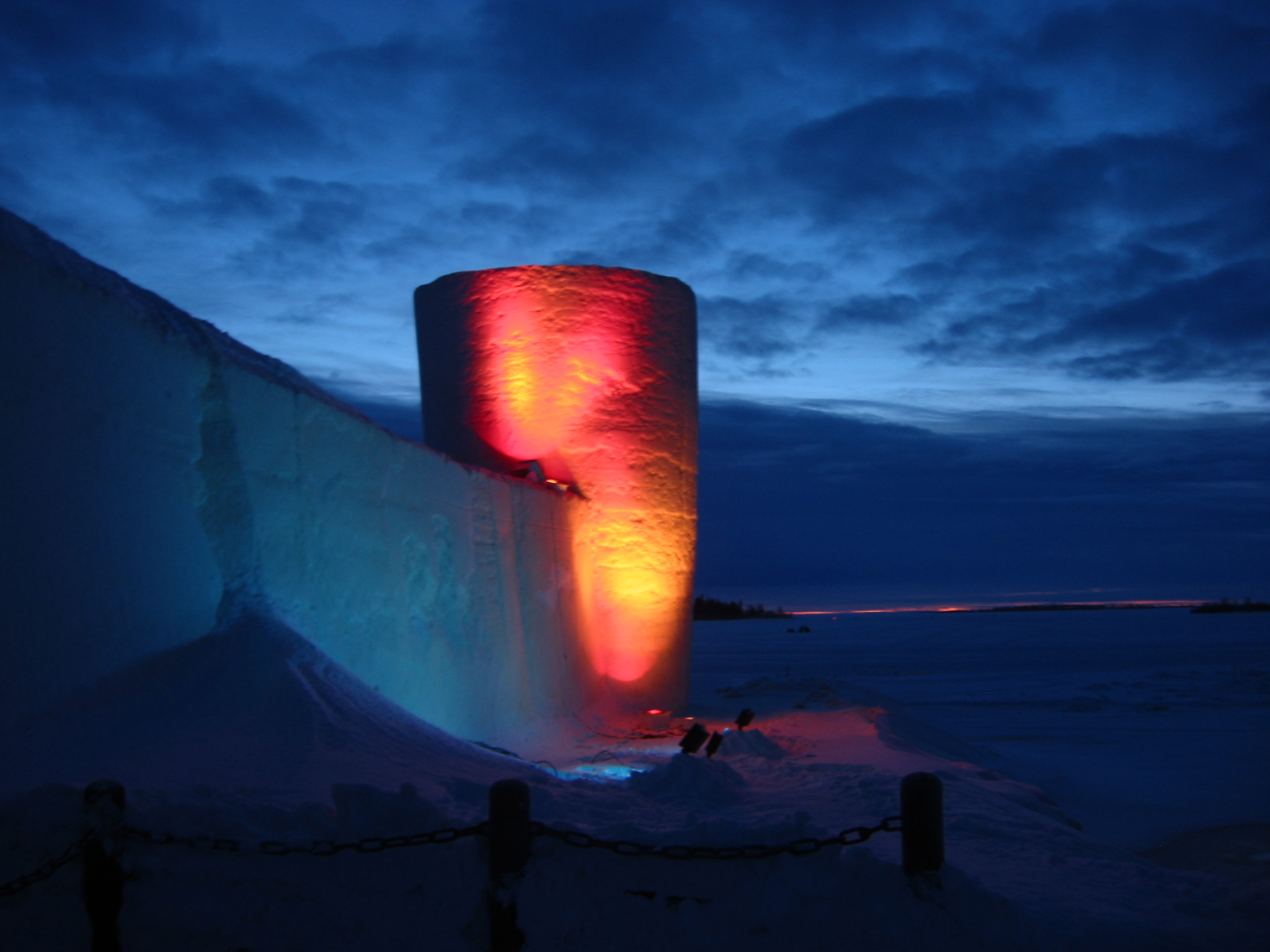
SnowCastle of Kemi

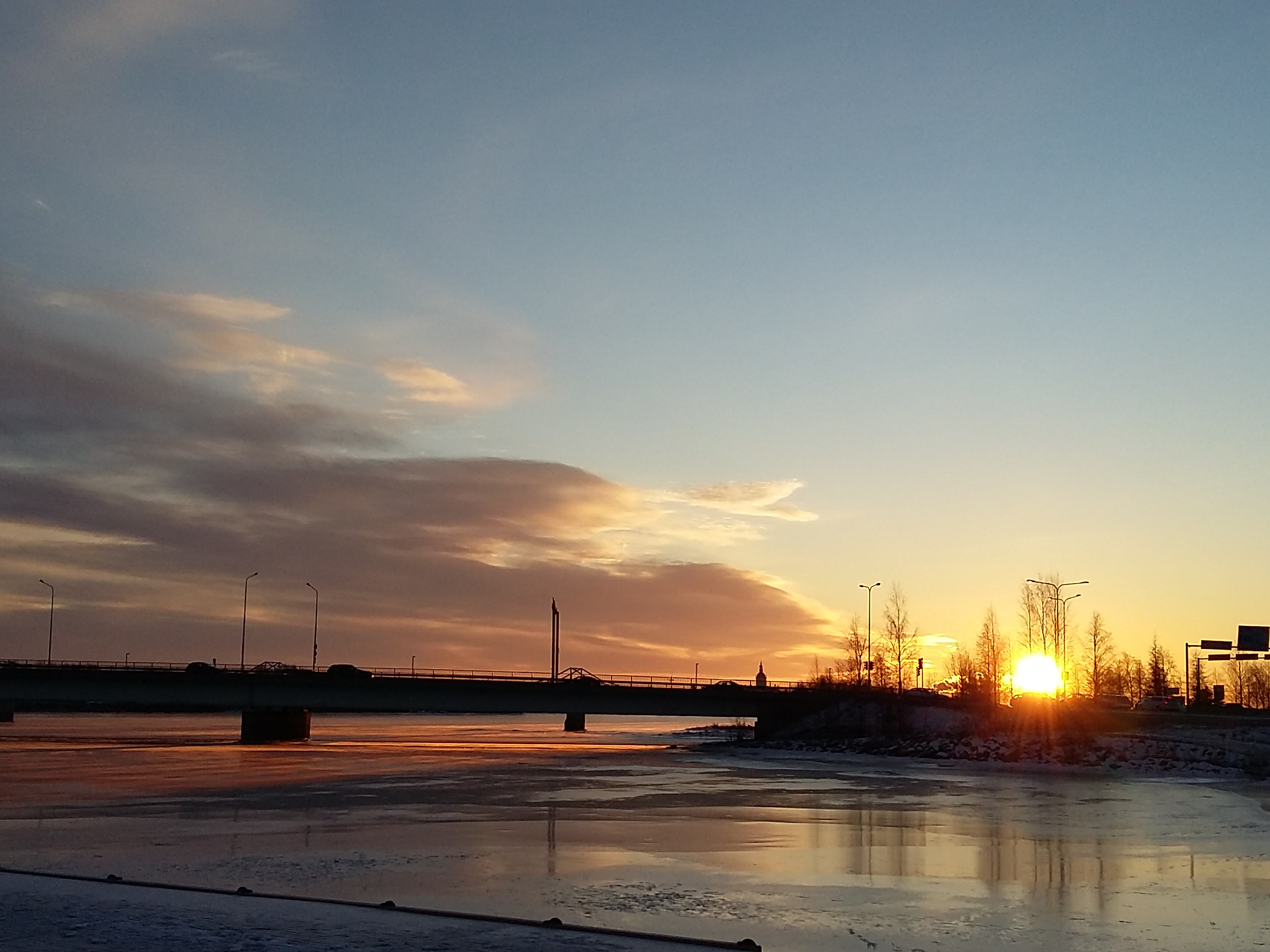
Picture of Tornionjoki river in the winter

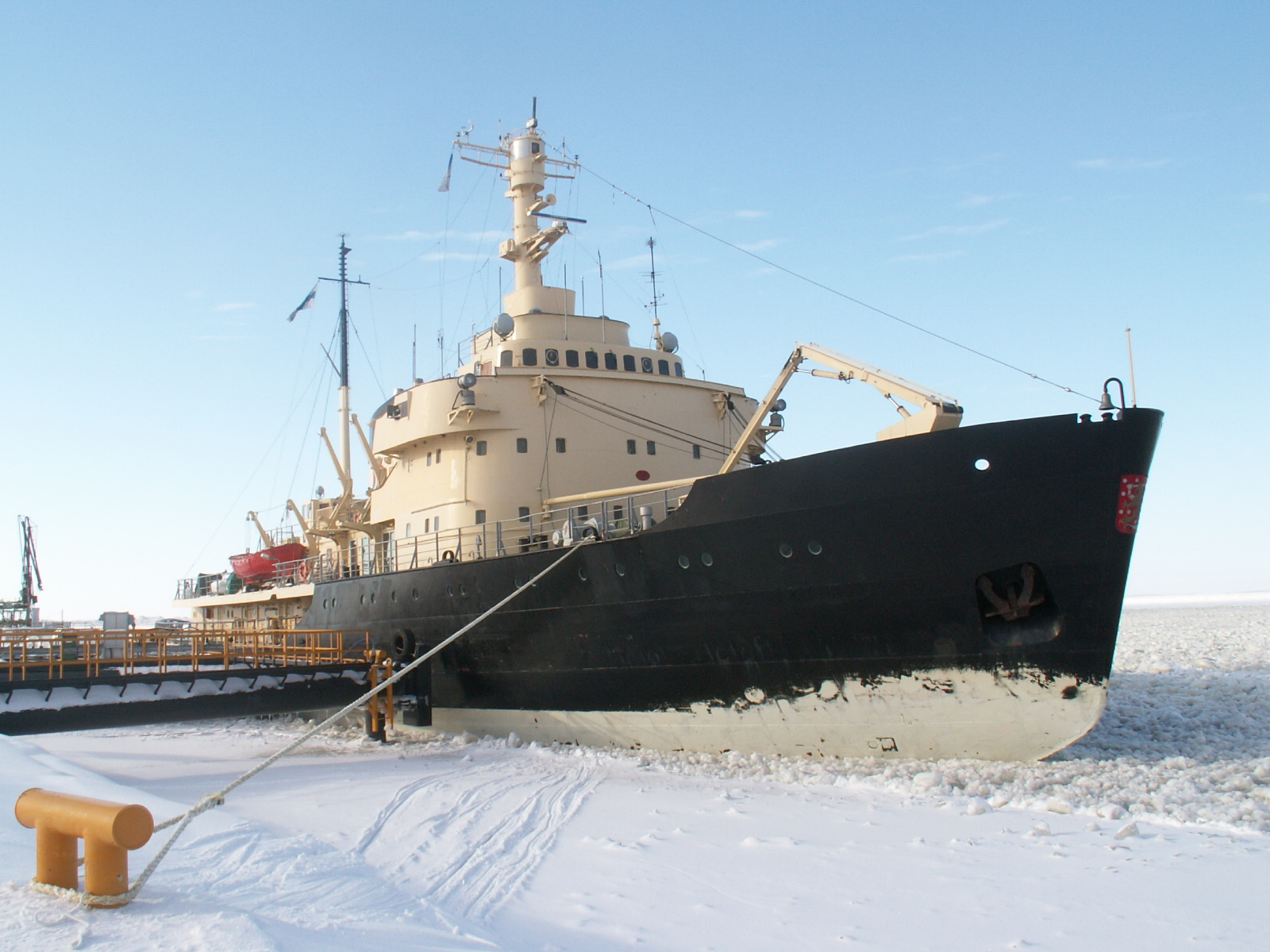
Icebreaker Sampo in Kemi

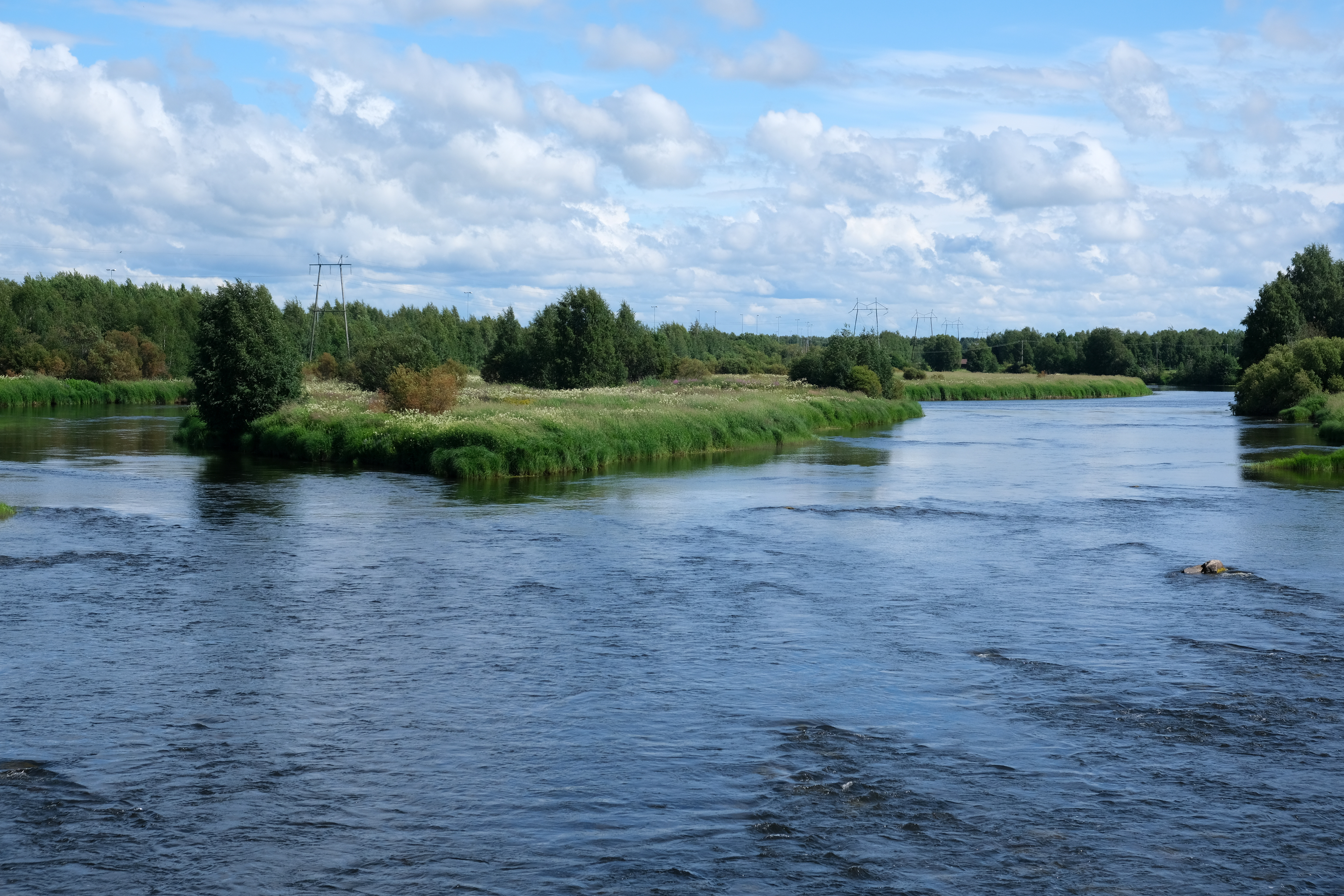
Liakanjoki river in Tornio

== See also ==
- Peräpohjola
