= Craft Museum of Finland =

Museum in Jyväskylä, Finland

Coordinates: 62.242225°N 25.745858°E

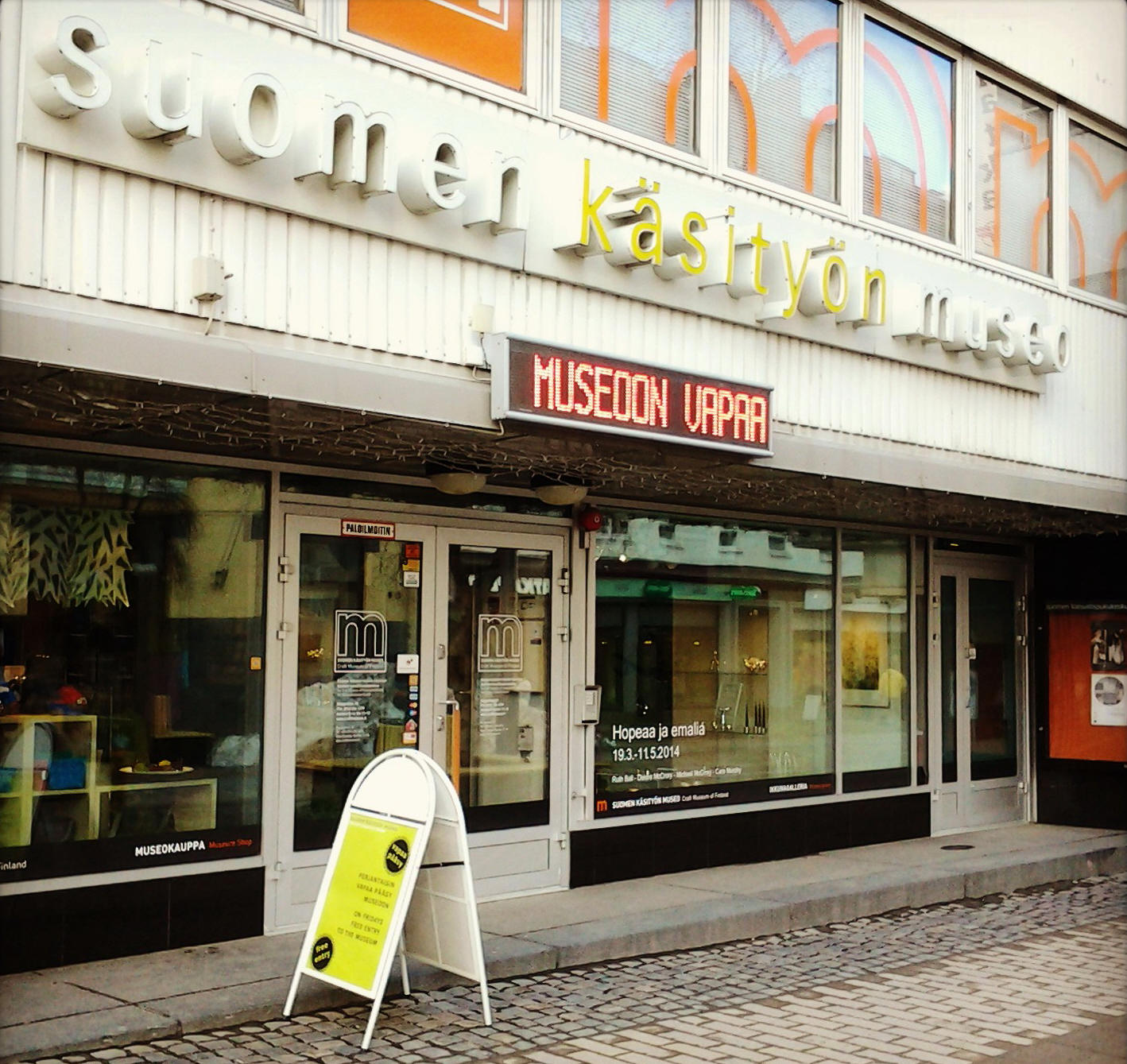

Craft Museum of Finland is a museum in Jyväskylä. Like the other national specialist museums in Finland, its task is to promote and guide museum activities and coordinate museum cooperation in the field of crafts. The museum also does research, documentation and exhibition work within its field.

The decision to establish a Craft museum in Finland was made already during the years of the Grand Duchy of Finland: The Senate of Finland budgeted funding for the museum since 1890. The museum operated under different organisations, and in 1933 it was discontinued. The museum restarted in 1982. It moved to its present location in 2000.

The collections now include over 17000 objects. The majority of old items are textiles, such as pieces of cloth, ribbons and various tablecloths. The museum's goal is to add to the collection essential examples of the handicraft culture from the present day. The journalist and craft teacher Tyyne-Kerttu Virkki donated her collection of 3000 items to the museum in 2010.

The National Costume Center of Finland is a part of the Craft Museum. The Center displays national costumes and other traditional clothing from Finland.
