= Tervola =

- Municipality
- Tervolan kunta Tervola kommun
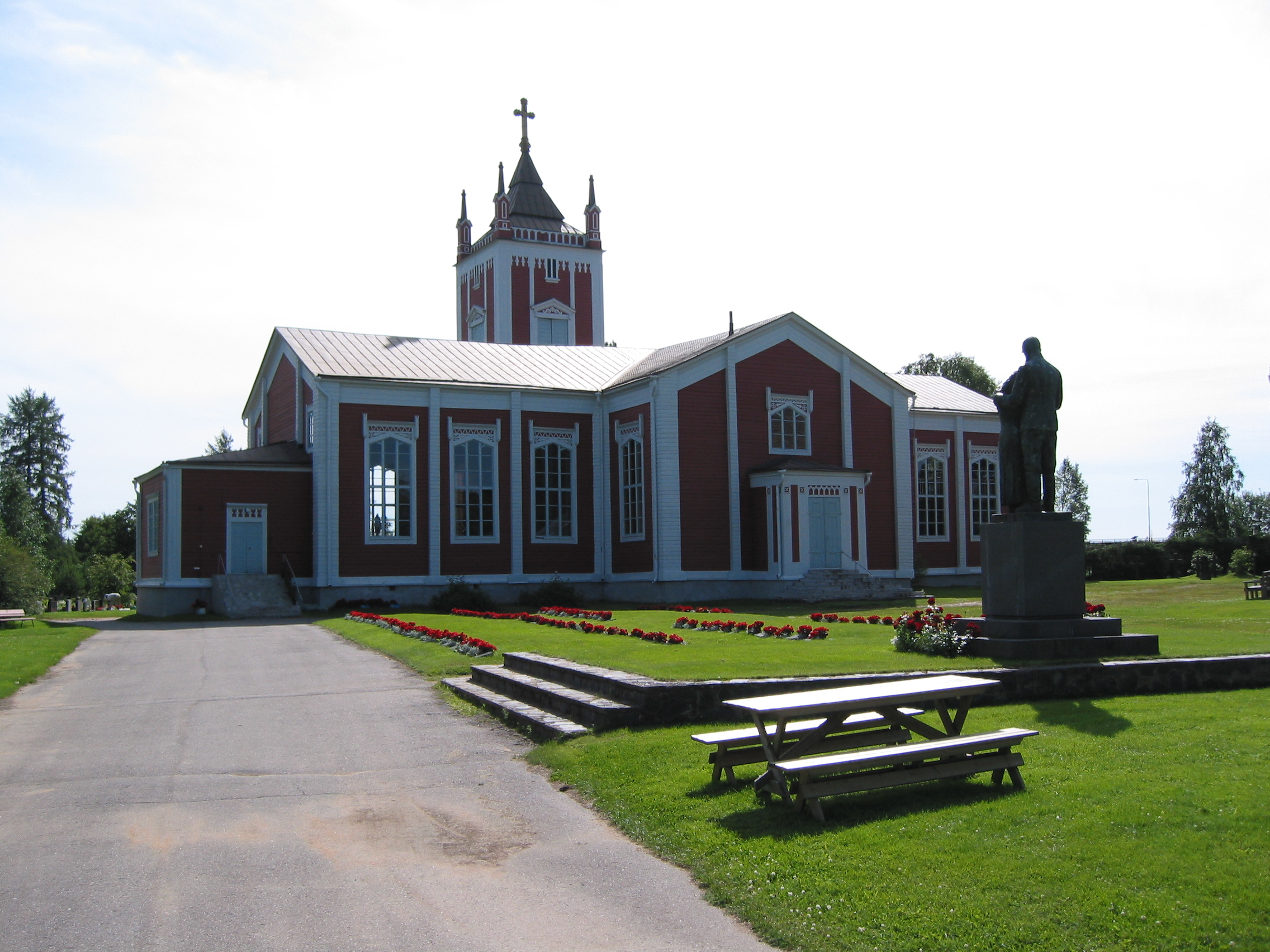
- Tervola Church

- Coat of arms

- Location of Tervola in Finland
- OpenStreetMap Interactive map outlining Tervola.
- Interactive map of Tervola
- Coordinates: 66°05′20″N 024°48′40″E
- Country: Finland
- Region: Lapland
- Sub-region: Kemi–Tornio

Government
  - Municipal manager: Mika Simoska

Area (2018-01-01)
  - Total: 1,592.03 km^{2} (614.69 sq mi)
  - Land: 1,559.72 km^{2} (602.21 sq mi)
  - Water: 32.66 km^{2} (12.61 sq mi)
  - Rank: 41st largest in Finland

Population (2025-12-31)
  - Total: 2,837
  - Rank: 221st largest in Finland
  - Density: 1.82/km^{2} (4.7/sq mi)

Population by native language
  - Finnish: 96.8% (official)
  - Others: 3.2%

Population by age
  - 0 to 14: 15.4%
  - 15 to 64: 54.9%
  - 65 or older: 29.6%
- Time zone: UTC+02:00 (EET)
  - Summer (DST): UTC+03:00 (EEST)
- Website: tervola.fi

Tervola is a municipality of Finland. It is located in the province of Lapland, Finland. The municipality has a population of 2,837 (31 December 2025) and covers an area of 1,592.03 square kilometres (614.69 sq mi) of which 32.66 km^{2} (12.61 sq mi) is water. The population density is 1.82 inhabitants per square kilometre (4.7/sq mi).

Neighbour municipalities are Keminmaa, Ranua, Rovaniemi, Simo, Tornio and Ylitornio. The municipality is unilingually Finnish.

The municipal coat of arms is inspired by the agricultural history of Tervola. The crane in the coat of arms refers to the swamps, from which a large part of the area's fields were cleared. The onion, in turn, is one of the plant species that thrives in these fields. The coat of arms was designed by Ahti Hammar and was adopted on February 15, 1957.

== History ==
Tervola is named after its first Finnish settler, a Savonian named Olli Paavonpoika Tervonen, mentioned on a tax list from the year 1579. The part of the Kemijoki between Paakkola and Rovaniemi was essentially uninhabited before his family's arrival.

The area was originally subordinate to Kemi, becoming a chapel community in 1627 under the name Lapinniemi, while the settlement name Tervola was first mentioned in 1796. Tervola became an independent parish in 1860.
