= Qwensel House =

Historic house in Turku, Finland

- Qwenselin talo/Qwenselska huset
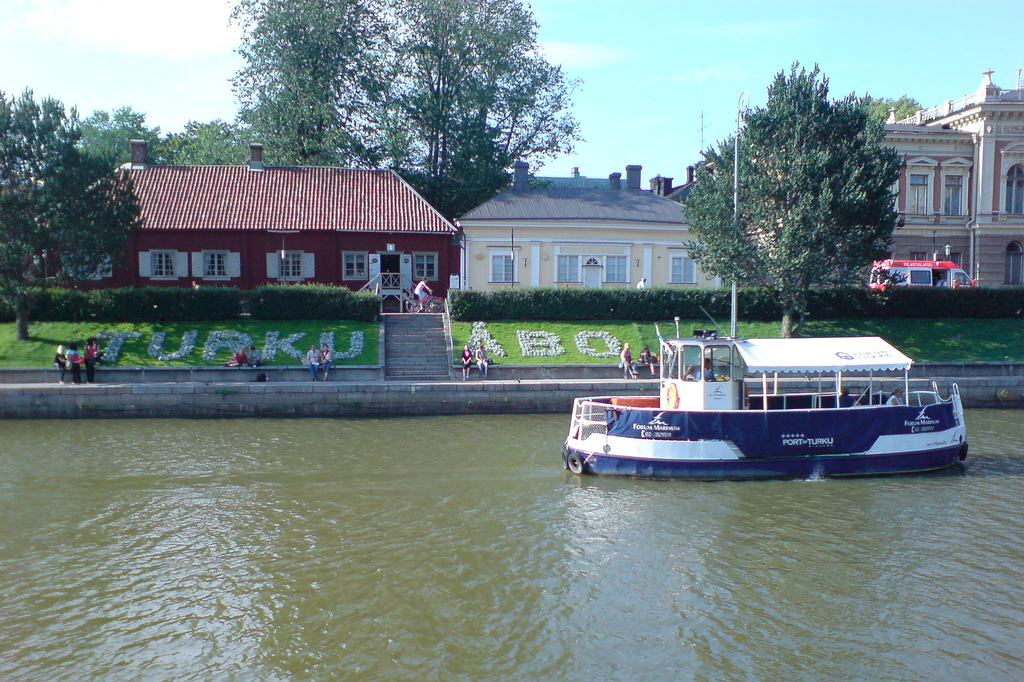
- The Qwensel House (on the left)
- Interactive map of the Qwensel House area

General information
- Location: Turku, Finland, Läntinen Rantakatu 13
- Coordinates: 60°26′55″N 22°16′4″E
- Completed: ca. 1700

The Qwensel House is the oldest wooden house in Turku, Finland. It is bourgeois housing from the autarchic times that has survived in its entirety. The house was built approximately in the year 1700 in an area that was reserved for the nobility in the city plan made up by Per Brahe the Younger in 1652. Today, the Qwensel House operates as the Turku Pharmacy Museum and café.

== Pharmacy Museum ==
The shop wing of the building was furnished with a pharmacy in the 19th century. The pharmacy has a material room and a herb room, two laboratories and an office. The office has the oldest survived pharmacy interior in Finland.

The exhibition wing of the building has Åke Lydman's collection of pharmacy utensils on display. There is also a pharmaceutical research laboratory and pharmacy history exhibition in the wing. In addition to the main exhibitions, there are also varying smaller exhibitions and programmes held at the museum every year.

The use of pharmaceutical herbs can be studied with the lead of an "apothecary" at the Children's Pharmacy, the courtyard and outdoors. The authentic pharmacy cabinet is from the Nykarleby Pharmacy.

The former stable, toilet and barn are located at the northern end of the Pakaritupa wing of the building. The Pipping family used to have a garden with apple trees and plants along Linnankatu (formerly Kuningattarenkatu).
