= Porvoo Town Hall =

Former Townhall in Porvoo, Finland

Coordinates: 60°23′43″N 025°39′29″E

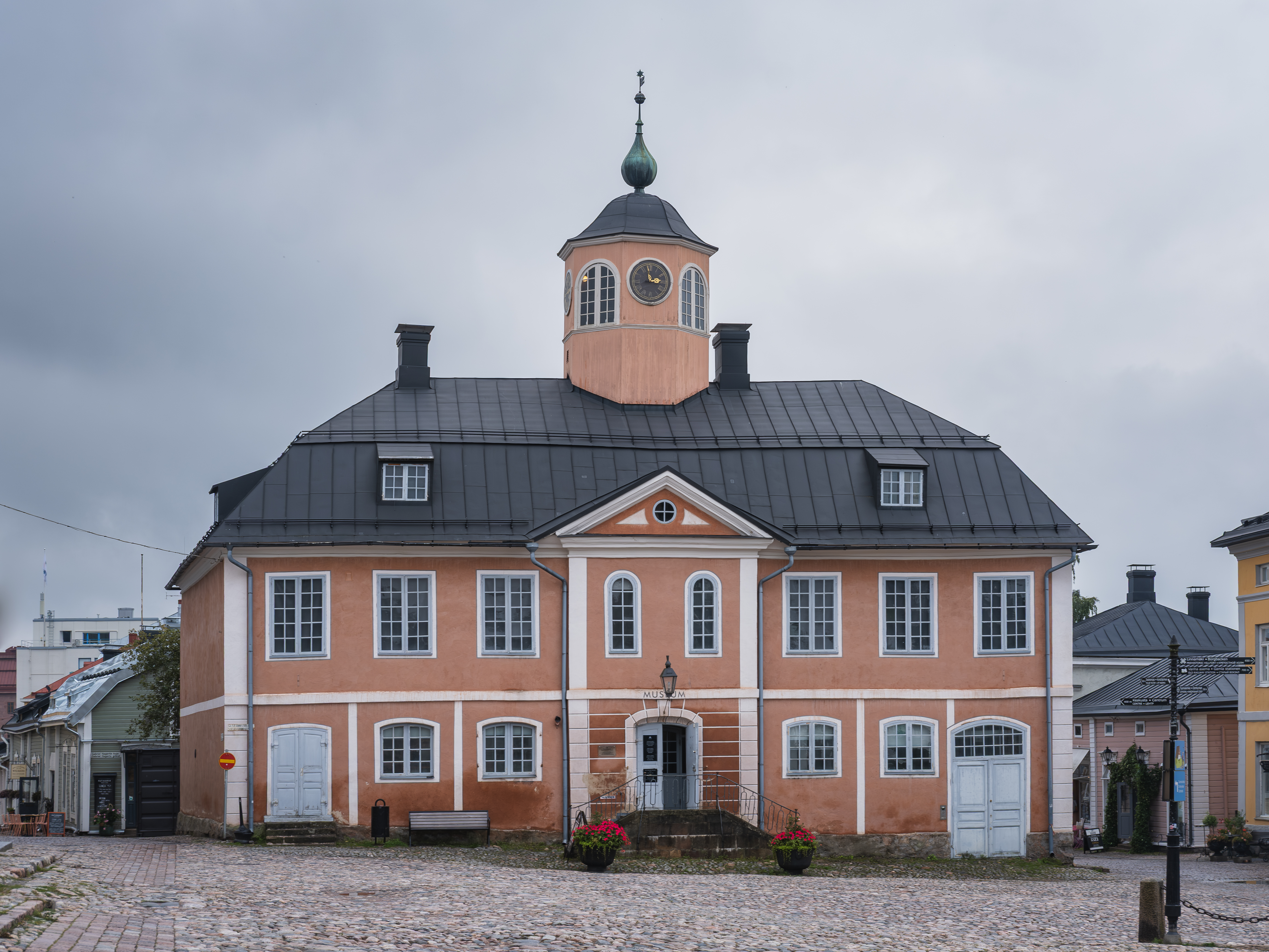
Porwoo Town Hall in 2024

The Porvoo Town Hall (or the Porvoo Rathaus; Finnish: Porvoon raatihuone; Swedish: Borgå rådhus) is a former town hall and current museum in Porvoo, Finland. It is located in the old town of Porvoo, in the immediate vicinity of the market square.

Porvoo Town Hall is the oldest town hall building in Finland, as the first written mention of the older Porvoo Town Hall dates back to 1545. The main contractor of the current town hall was Gabriel Hagert (1706–1774), the Mayor of Porvoo, who received financial support from the parliament and the Nyland Brigade for construction work. The building was designed by master builder Gotthard Flensborg (1723–1803). It was built between 1762 and 1764 and was mainly built between 1763 and 1764. The town hall was commissioned no later than the autumn of 1764. Its wooden bell tower was completed in 1771. The building represents Hårlemanian Baroque classicism. It is two-floor, brick and with an attic roof. The foundations of the building have not initially withstood the weight of thick structures and it has been tilted obliquely. The depression has not been corrected, because the sloping floors have already been adjusted and the depression has stopped.

The Porvoo Museum has several exhibitions in the building. The permanent exhibitions in the town hall present the history of Eastern Uusimaa from the Ice Age to the 18th century, the town hall, and 19th century artists of the Golden Age of Finnish Art: Albert Edelfelt, Ville Vallgren, Johan Knutson, Louis Sparre, A. W. Finch and Saara Hopea.

In accordance with the medieval urban tradition, the Christmas Peace is declared every year in Porvoo. The declaration will be made on Christmas Eve at 4 pm from the town hall stairs. The local band and male choir will perform Christmas carols at the event.

== See also ==
- Porvoo Cathedral
- Porvoo Museum
- Rauma Old Town Hall
- Tartu Town Hall
