= Porvoo Museum =

Coordinates: 60.3952°N 25.6581°E

- Porvoon museo / Borgå museum
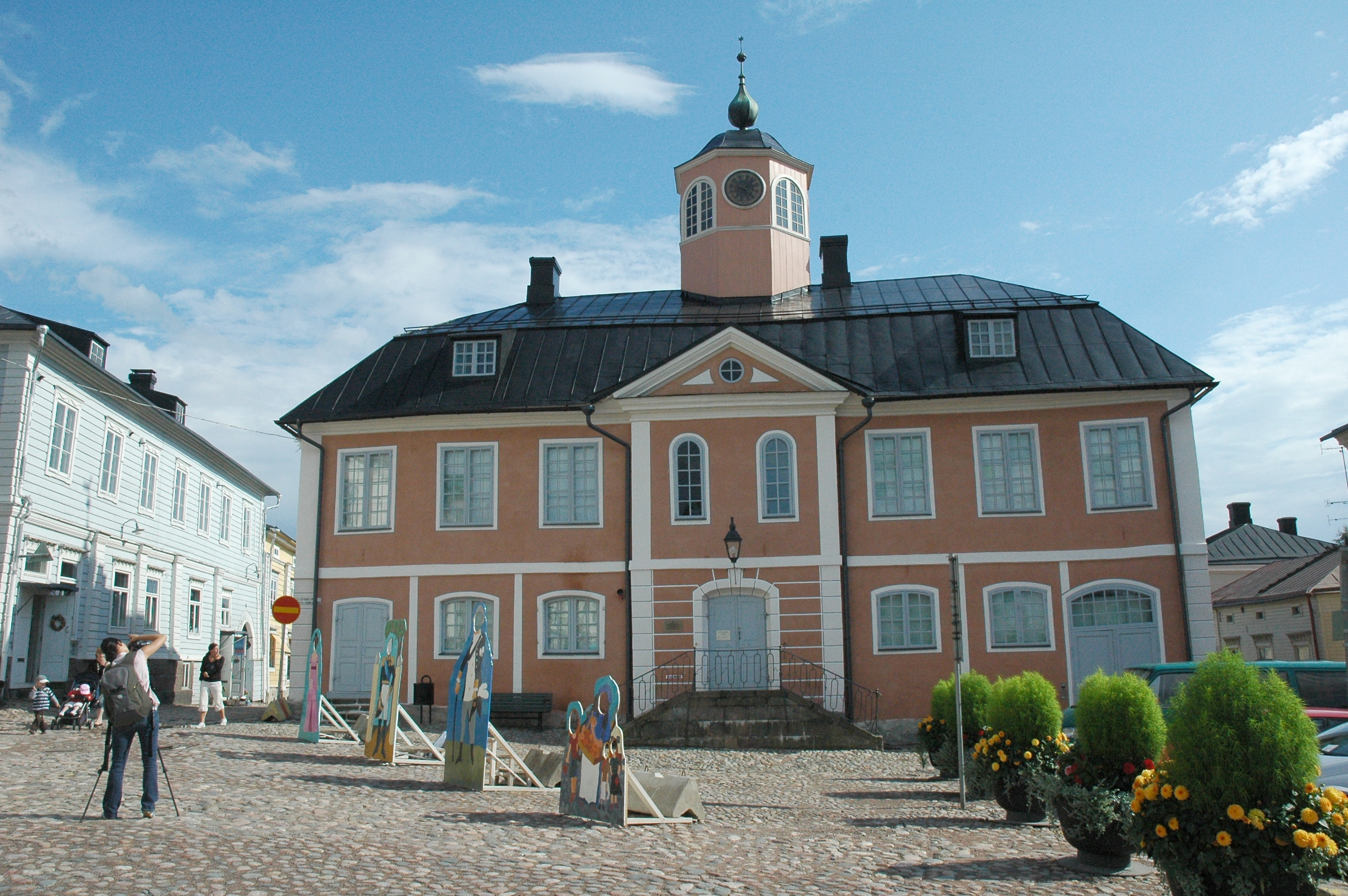
- The Old Town Hall in Porvoo.
- Established: 1897
- Location: Porvoo, Eastern Uusimaa, Finland
- Type: History museum, Regional responsibility museum
- Founder: Borgå Museiförening
- Owner: Borgå Museiförening
- Website: www.porvoonmuseo.fi

Porvoo Museum (Finnish: Porvoon museo, Swedish: Borgå museum) is a history museum established in 1897 in Porvoo, Finland. The museum is the regional responsibility museum of Eastern Uusimaa. Porvoo Museum operates in the old Porvoo Town Hall, completed in 1764. The museum is owned by its own association, whereas typically regional responsibility museums are owned by the cities or towns in Finland.

Visitors can enter the museum with the Finnish Museum Card.

== History ==
Porvoo Museum was established when the Borgå Museiförening (Porvoo Museum Association), founded in 1896, established Porvoo Museum the following year. The city of Porvoo handed over the old town hall to function as a museum. The city had no use for the building as it was in poor condition and a decision had already been made to dismantle the town hall.

Borgå Museiförening organised a public collection of articles for the museum in May which created a foundation for the first exhibition of the museum in January 1897. Porvoo Museum was named the provincial museum of Eastern Uusimaa in 1982 and in 2020 it became the regional responsibility museum of Eastern Uusimaa. The museum is still owned by the museum association but it is financially maintained by the city of Porvoo.

== Buildings and exhibitions ==
Porvoo Museum has two base exhibitions which are located in the Old Town Hall and in Holm's House, completed in 1763. The exhibition in the Old Town Hall showcases the history of Porvoo and Eastern Uusimaa from the Ice Age to the 18th century. Additionally the Old Town Hall houses artwork by Albert Edelfelt and Ville Vallgren, both of whom were born in Porvoo.

The Holm's House is a house museum of a wealthy 18th century merchant. The building is furnished according to the era.

In addition to the Old Town Hall and the Holm's House Porvoo Museum also manages the home of the National Poet of Finland, J. L. Runeberg. The house of Runeberg exhibits the life of the poet and his family in the 19th century.

== In popular culture ==
The old town hall building, which houses a portion of the Porvoo Museum, was featured in the 1997 action thriller film The Jackal, doubling as a location in where a Russian mob associate exits a hotel.
