= Christmas Peace =

Finnish tradition

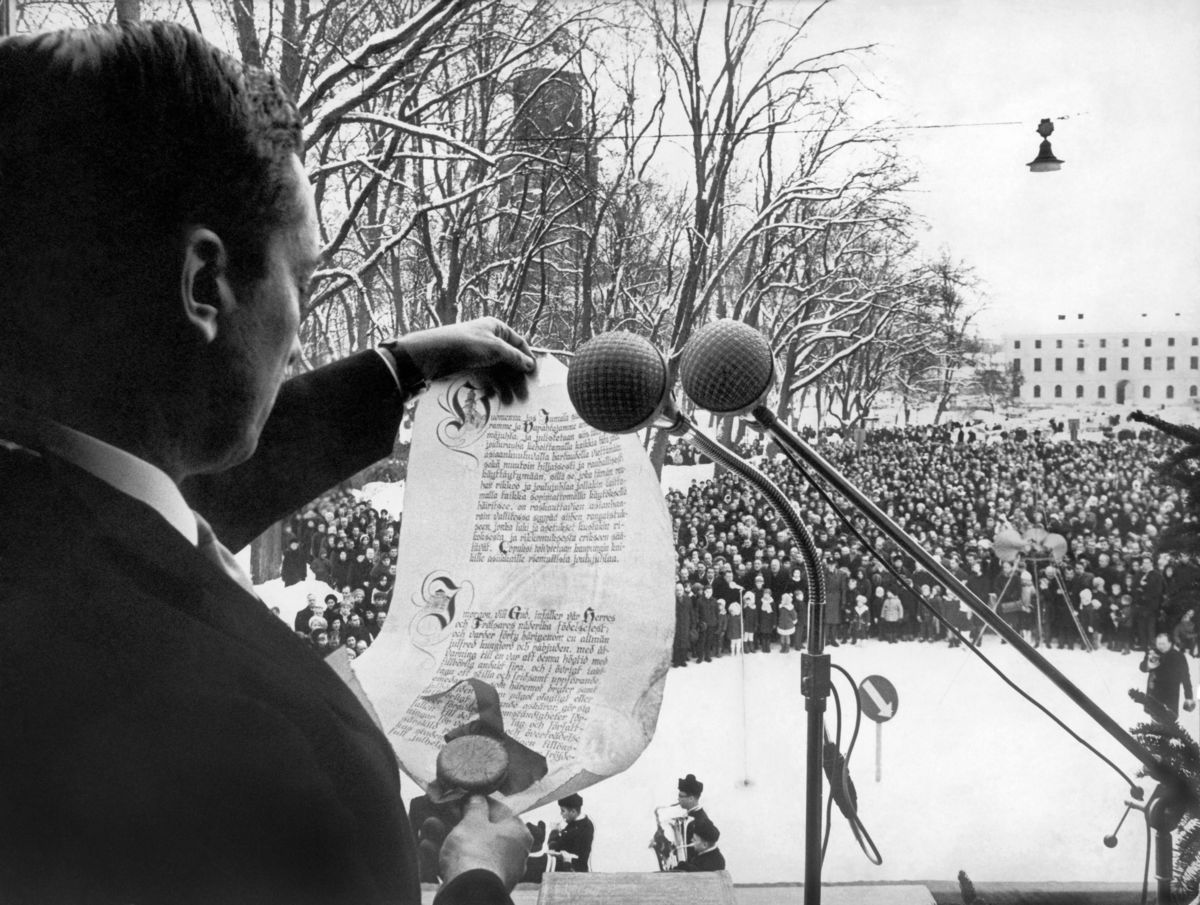
The declaration of Christmas Peace in Turku in 1965, read by Eero Soikkanen, Secretary of the Magistrate.

Christmas Peace (Finnish: joulurauha, Swedish: julfrid) is a traditional Finnish event whereby a town formally announces the beginning of the Christmas season. This practice has its roots in old Swedish legislation and was established by Birger Jarl in the 13th century, building upon the Truce of God tradition. Offenders who committed crimes during the Christmas season were subjected to harsher punishments. The declaration of Christmas Peace is a symbolic and integral part of the Christmas tradition in Finland in the present day. Tradition encourages people to be respectful and peaceful at Christmas.

== Declaration in Finland ==
The tradition of Christmas Peace has survived in Finland, which was part of Sweden from the late 13th century until 1809. The Declaration of Christmas Peace is declared in several Finnish towns on Christmas Eve. The statement intimates the possibility of stricter sanctions for infringements committed throughout the festive season, yet its legal effects have not been enforced since 1889. In modern times, the message is largely symbolic. For many Finns, the Declaration of Christmas Peace marks the beginning of the festive season.

=== Turku ===
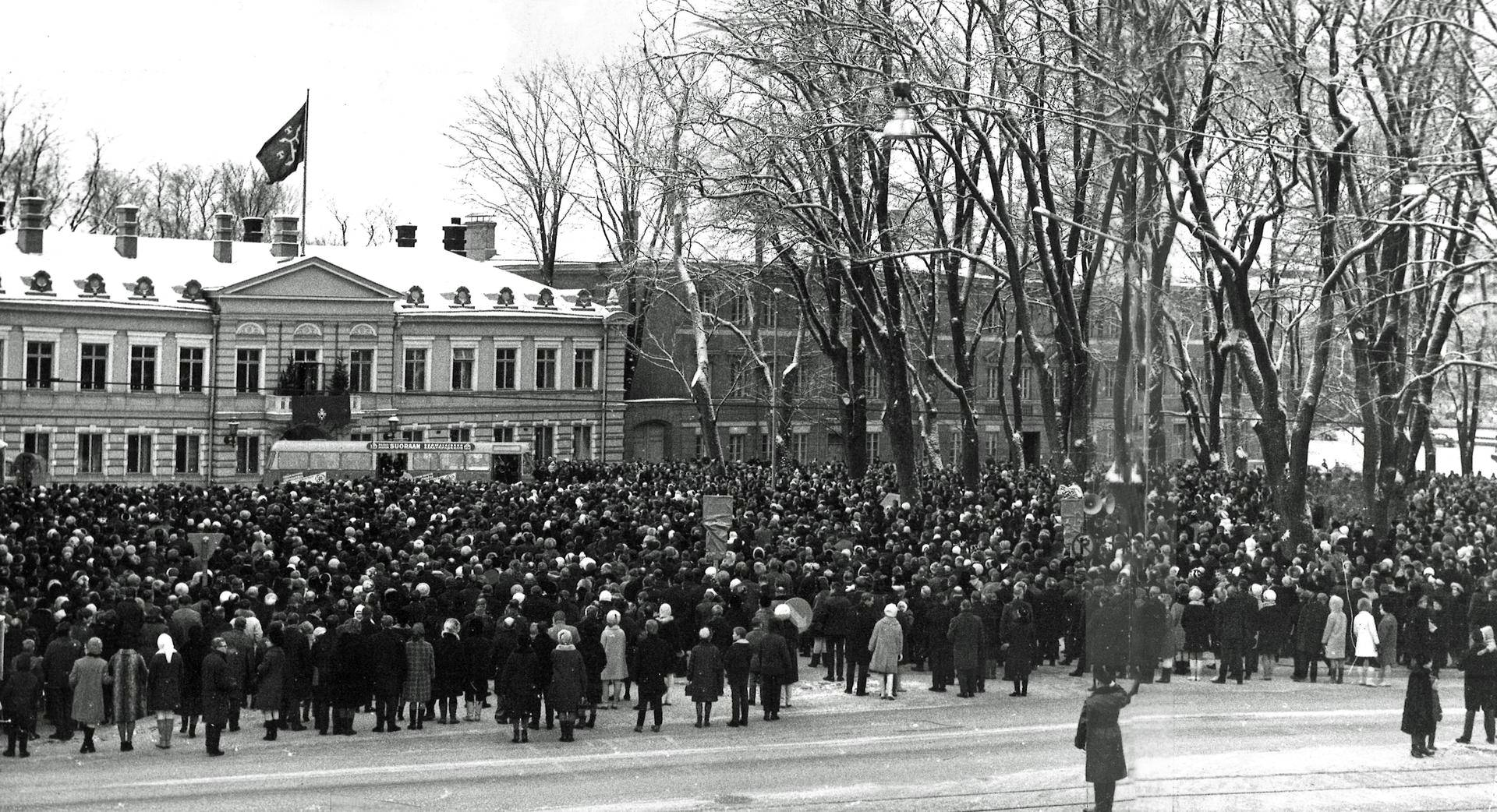
Christmas Peace Declaration in 1967

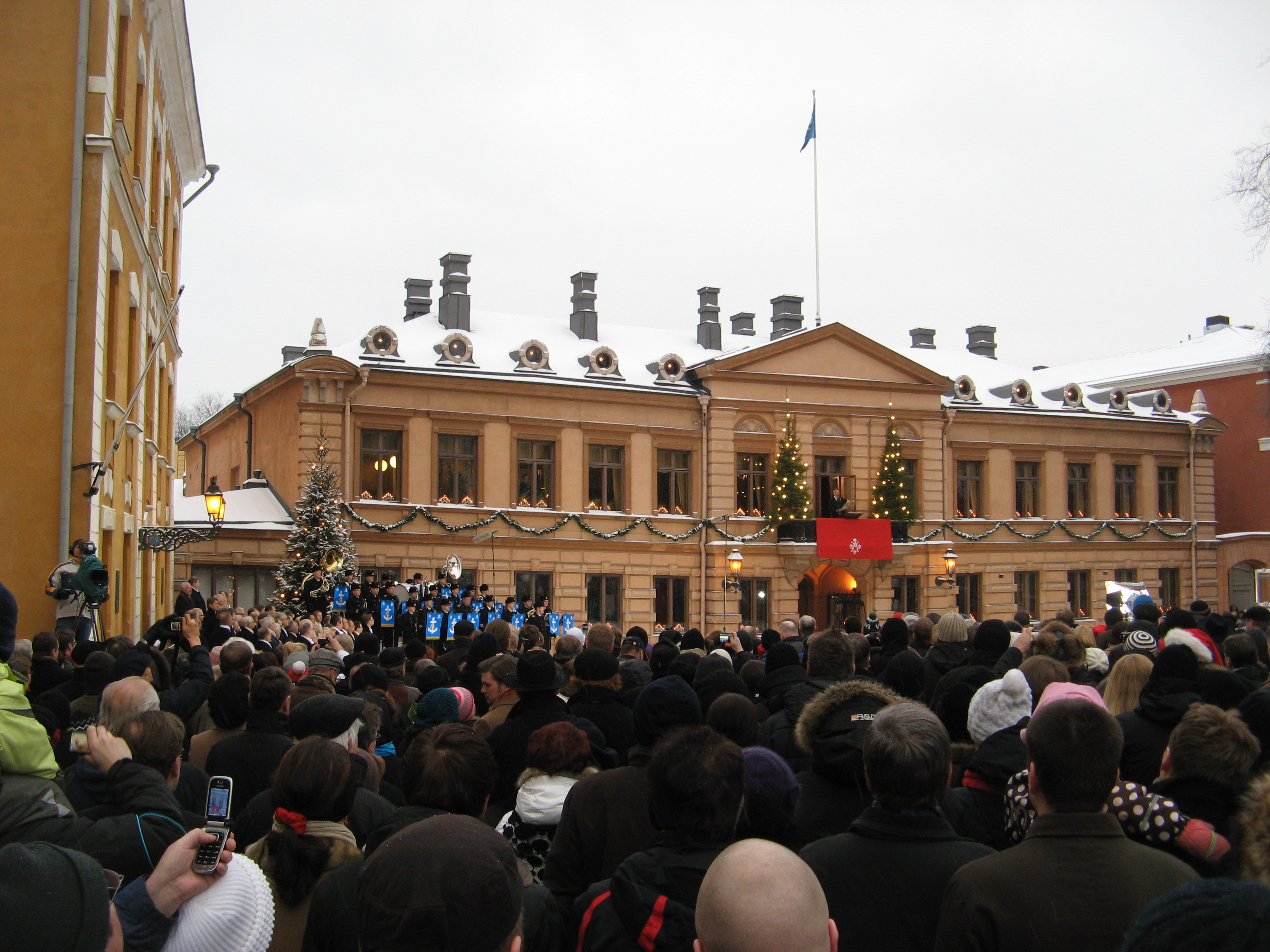
Declaration of Christmas Peace at the Old Great Square of Turku in 2009

The oldest event takes place at noon in the Old Great Square of the city of Turku, the oldest town and the former capital of Finland. The Christmas Peace has been declared from the balcony of the Brinkkala Mansion in the Old Great Square since 1886. This tradition dates back to the 14th century, but the exact origins of its early centuries remain unclear. (Note: Some sources refer to the 1320s. However, this was long after the death of Birger Jarl.) (Note: The tradition lacks confirmed evidence that the custom was held continuously from the Middle Ages. However, the tradition can be contextualised by evidence from other medieval Swedish towns with surviving later medieval court records.)

According to tradition, the declaration has been made every year with few interruptions. The most significant exceptions are thought to be the years of the Great Wrath, when Finland was under Russian occupation from 1712 to 1721, and the single years missed during the militia strike of 1917 and the Winter War of 1939. There may also have been a break between 1800 and 1815. In 2020 and 2021 the Christmas Peace was declared without an audience due to the COVID-19 pandemic.

The Turku Declaration has been broadcast by the Finnish Broadcasting Company (YLE) since 1935. National television broadcasts began in 1983, and the Turku Declaration has also been shown on Swedish television since 1986.

Music has been part of the event since the 17th century. Traditional instruments include bagpipes, timpani and various stringed instruments. The current format was established in 1903. It begins with the hymn A Mighty Fortress Is Our God and is followed by the Declaration, which is read at noon by a city official. As the proclamation is read in Finnish and Swedish, the public then sings the Finnish national anthem in both languages. The event ends with the March of the Men of Pori, usually played by a local military band, usually from the Finnish Navy.

Over the centuries, the message of the proclamation has varied. In the 17th century, for example, it emphasised that people shouldn't get drunk at Christmas. At the turn of the 19th and 20th centuries, nationalism was added. Nonetheless, four factors have remained constant. The first part tells about the beginning of Christmas, the second is a reminder to respect the holiday with dignified behaviour, the third is a threat about the consequences of breaking good behaviour and the last declaration wishes a Merry Christmas.

The present text has its origins in a transcription from memory onto parchment by the town clerk after the original was lost in a Great Fire in 1827. English translation of the Turku Declaration of Christmas Peace:

Tomorrow, God willing,
is the graceful celebration of the birth of our Lord and Saviour;

and thus is declared a peaceful Christmas time to all, by advising devotion and to behave otherwise quietly and peacefully,

because he who breaks this peace and violates the peace of Christmas by any illegal or improper behaviour shall under aggravating circumstances be guilty and punished according to what the law and statutes prescribe for each and every offence separately.

Finally, a joyous Christmas feast is wished to all inhabitants of the city.

=== Other cities ===
Besides Turku, the declaration is also announced in some of the oldest Finnish towns like Rauma, Porvoo and Pori.

== Declaration in Estonia ==
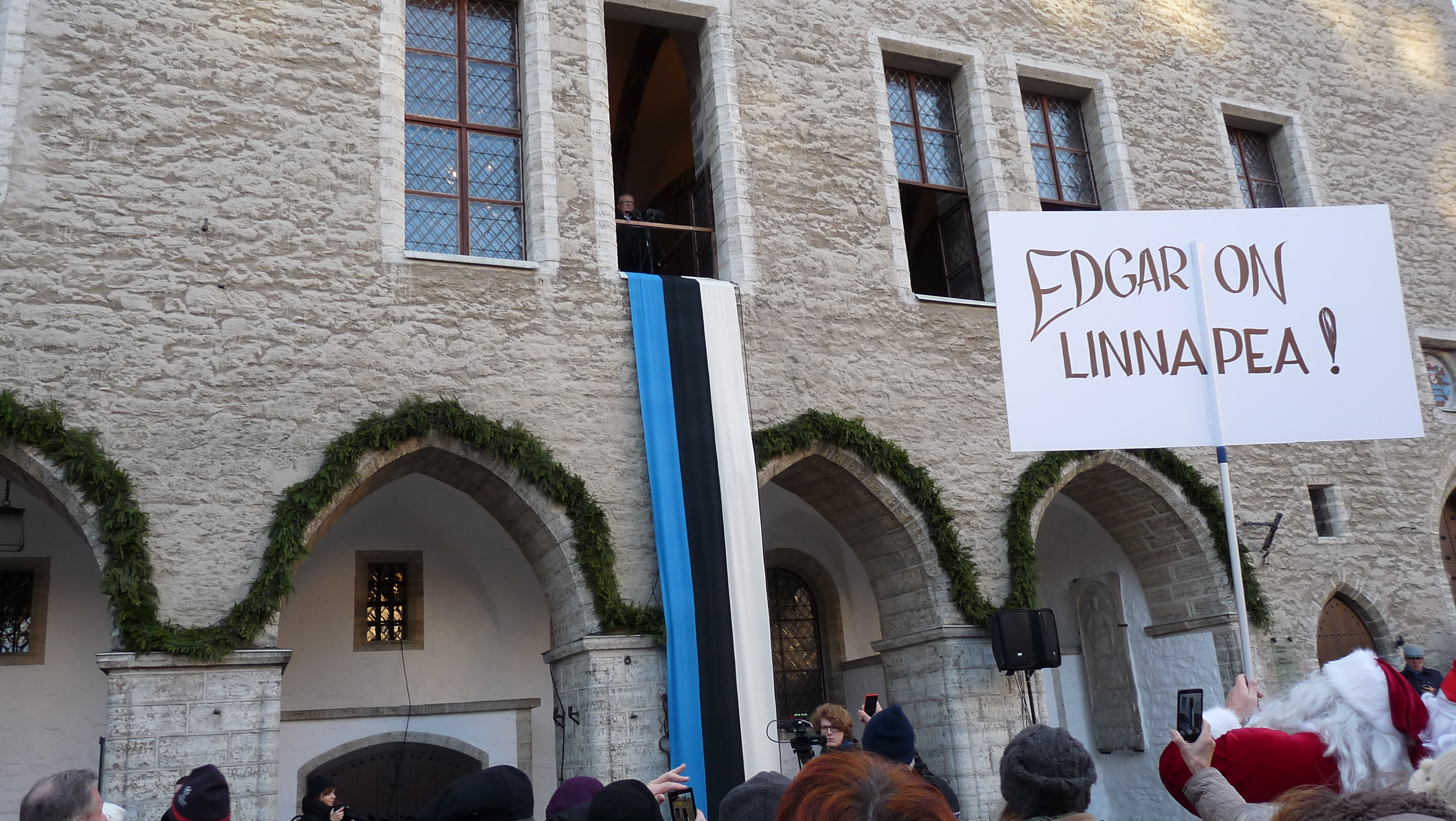
Christmas Peace in Estonia

In Estonia, the declaration of Christmas peace is being held in the city of Tartu. The tradition dates back to the 17th century, during the reign of Queen Christina of Sweden, when a unique peace was occasionally declared even in the most adverse circumstances. Generally, either the mayor or town secretary of the city would make the Christmas Peace proclamation minutes before Christmas Eve afternoon.

After Estonia regained its independence, there was a resurgence of traditional practices in the country.

== Gallery ==
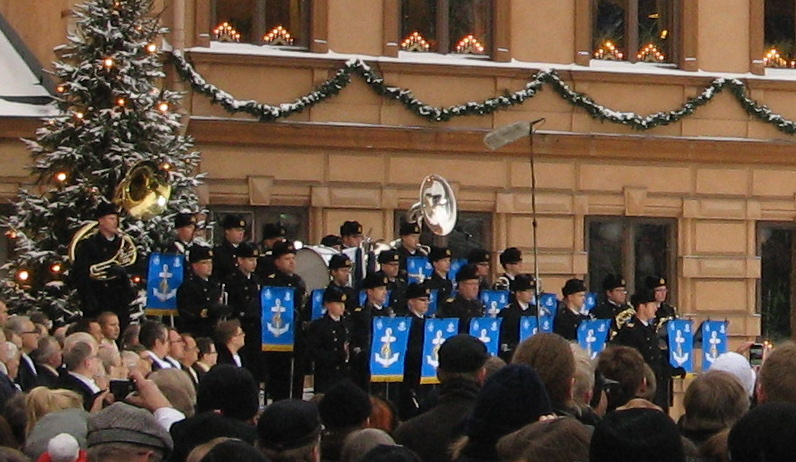
Finnish Navy Band playing in Turku

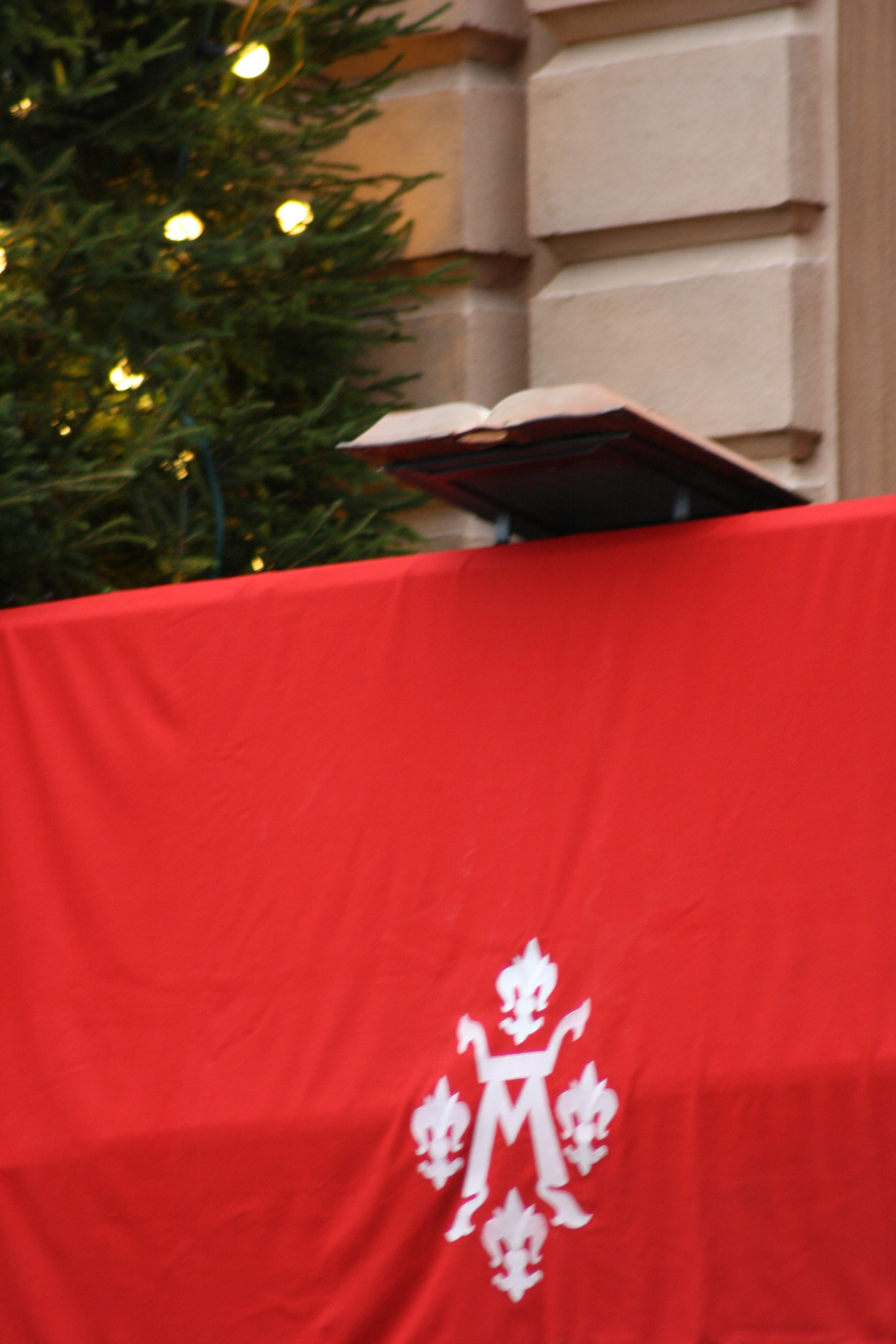
Balcony in Turku where the declaration is announced

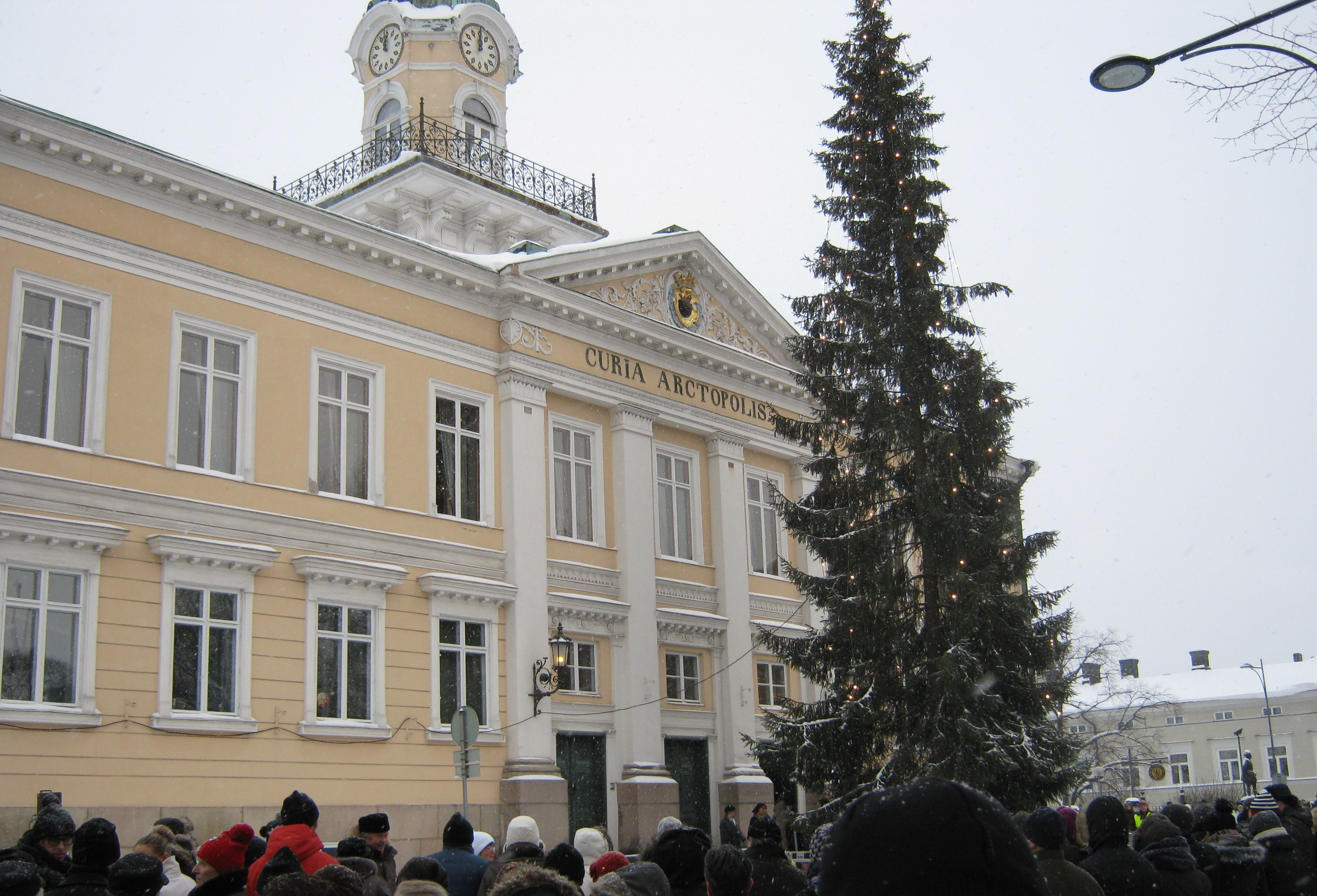
Declaration of Christmas Peace at the Old Town Hall of Pori

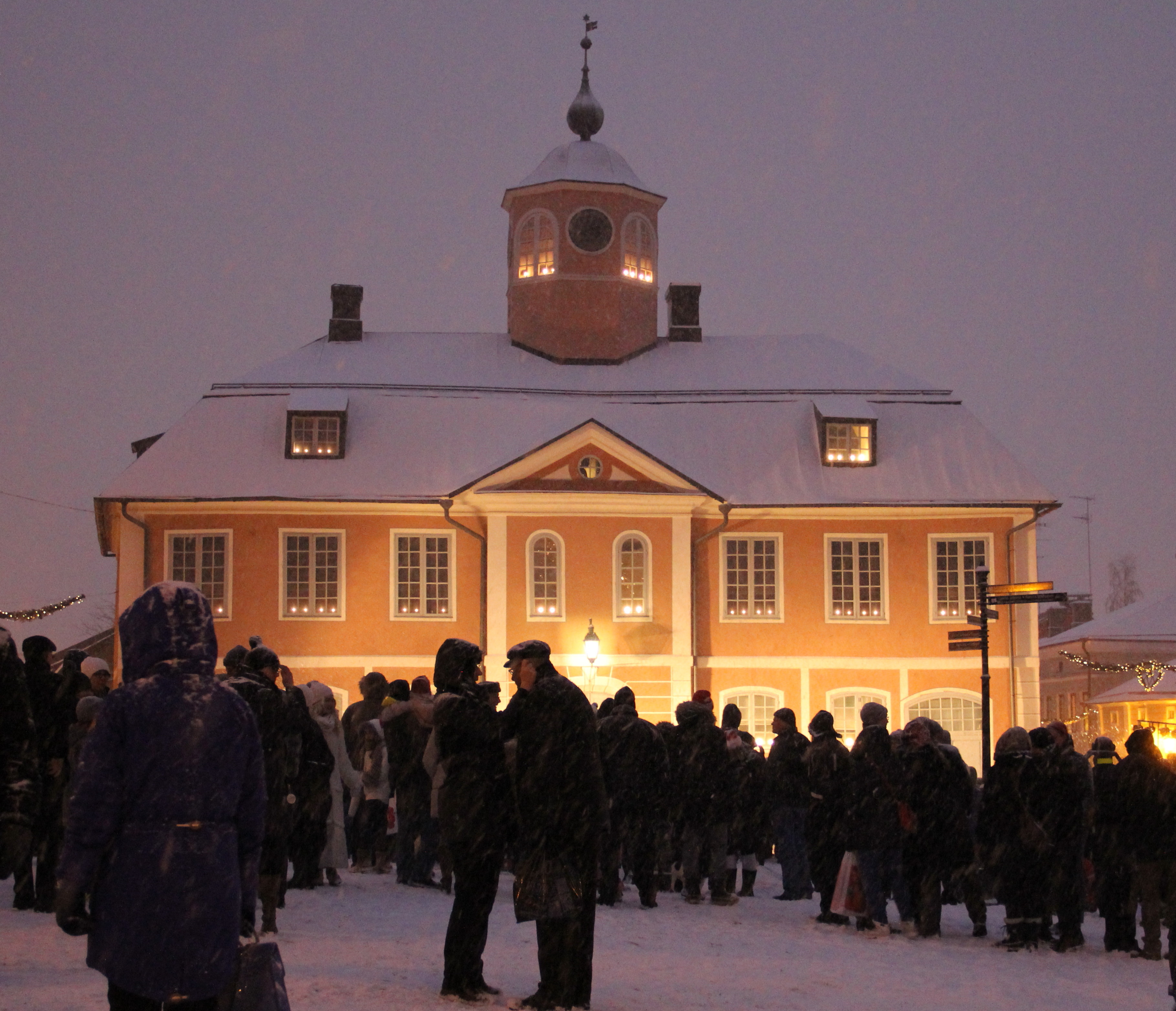
Declaration of Christmas Peace in 2014 in front of the old town hall of Porvoo

== See also ==
- Christmas truce of World War I
