= Old Rauma =

UNESCO World Heritage Site
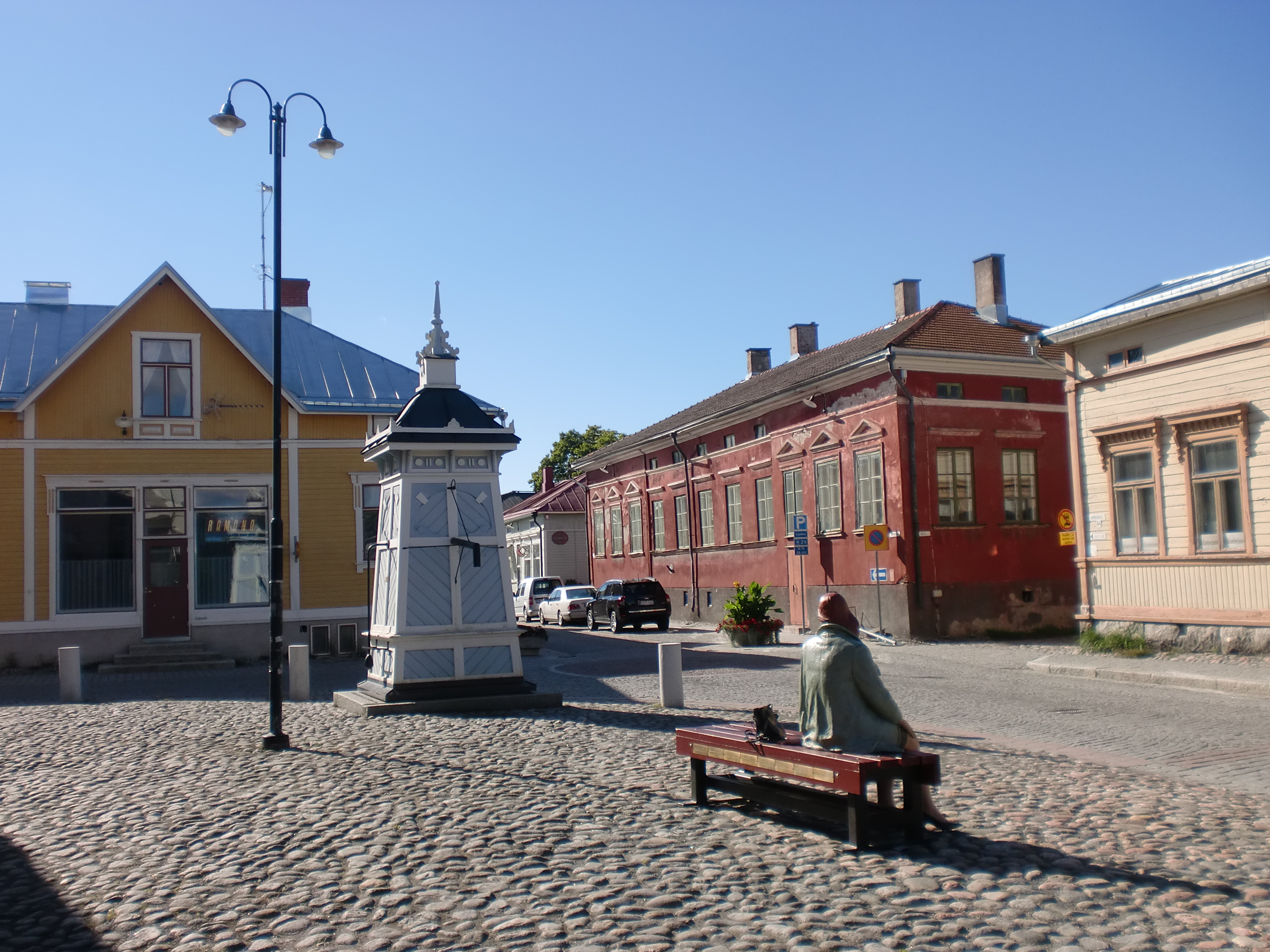
- Hauenguano square

- Location within Finland
- Location: Rauma, Finland
- Criteria: Cultural: iv, v
- Reference: 582
- Inscription: 1991 (15th Session)
- Area: 29 ha (72 acres)
- Buffer zone: 142 ha (350 acres)
- Coordinates: 61°07′42″N 21°30′42″E

Old Rauma (Finnish: Vanha Rauma, Swedish: Gamla Raumo) is the wooden centre of the town of Rauma, Finland. It was inscribed on the UNESCO World Heritage List in 1991 because of its unique wooden architecture and its well-preserved medieval town layout. It is one of the only medieval towns in Finland.

The area of Old Rauma is about 0.3 km^{2}, with approximately six hundred buildings (counting both proper houses and smaller buildings like sheds) and about 800 people living in the area. The oldest buildings date from the 18th century, as two fires in 1640 and 1682 destroyed much of the town. However, the layout of the town center still retains much of its medieval structure. The wooden buildings are almost exclusively one story, although several older buildings also have cellars. The residential buildings are located along the main street, whereas the ancillary buildings (for example, grain houses and sheds) were constructed along narrow alleyways. Most buildings are currently inhabited and owned by private individuals, although along the two main streets and around the town square they are mainly outside in business use. In the 18th century, the town of Rauma expanded outside the Old Rauma proper, and the increased ship trading led to the modernization of the city.

Although Old Rauma was almost completely destroyed by fires, a few buildings and ruins survive from medieval times. The Church of the Holy Cross, a Franciscan monastery church inaugurated in 1512, contains several medieval paintings and is one of the main attractions in Old Rauma. Another church in Old Rauma, the Church of the Holy Trinity, also from the 15th century, burned in the fire of 1640. The only other ancient stone building is the Old Town Hall, which was constructed in 1776.

Other locations of special interest include the Kirsti house, which is a seaman's house from the 18th and 19th centuries, and the Marela house, which is a shipowner's house dating to the 18th century but with a 19th-century facade, both of which are currently museums.
