= Church of the Holy Cross, Rauma =

Church of the Holy Cross
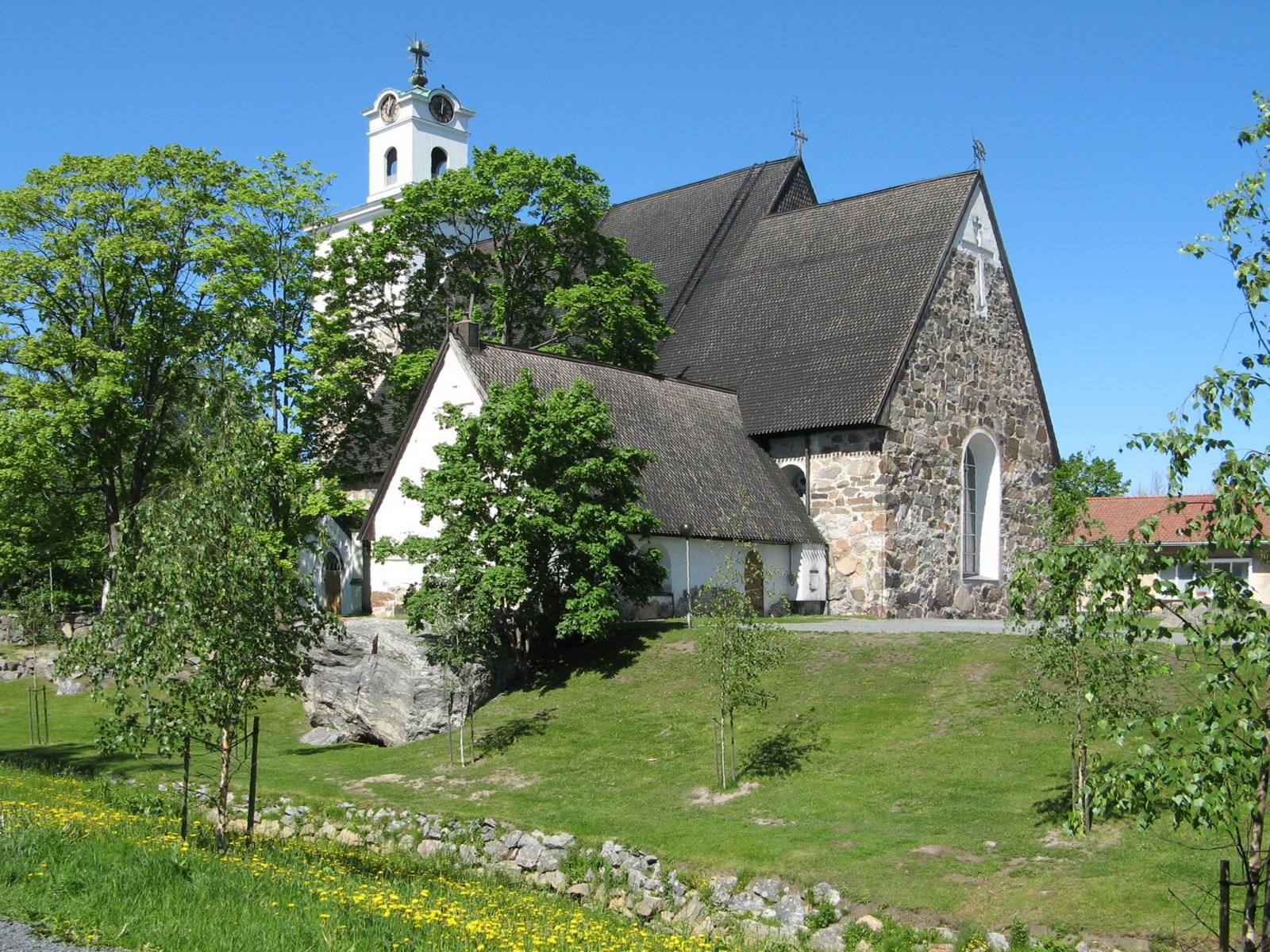
- Interactive map of the Church of the Holy Cross area

General information
- Location: Rauma, Finland
- Coordinates: 61°07′47″N 21°30′44″E
- Construction started: 1515; 511 years ago
- Completed: 1520; 506 years ago

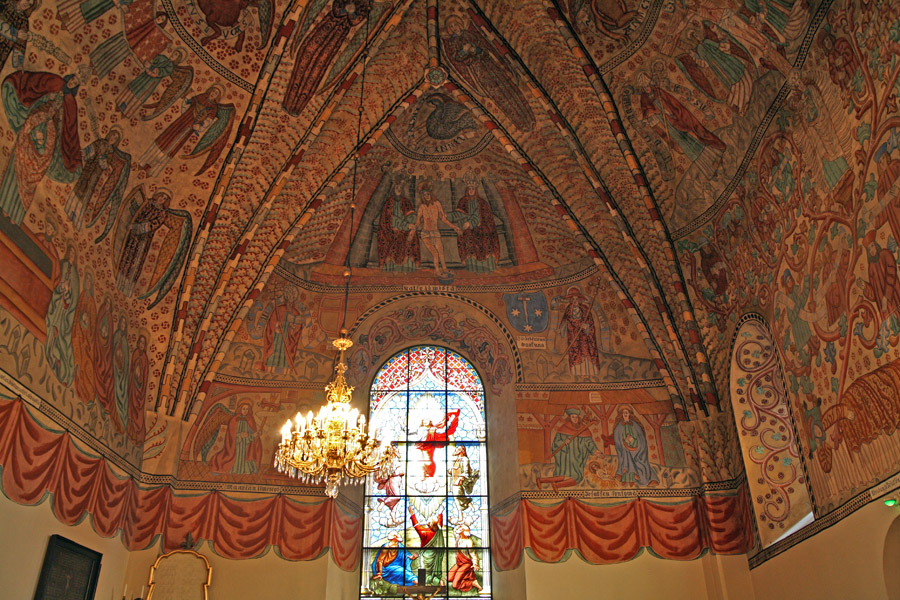
Frescos in the choir vault

The Church of the Holy Cross (Finnish: Pyhän Ristin kirkko, Swedish: Heliga korsets kyrka) is a medieval fieldstone church in Rauma, Finland. It is located in the UNESCO World Heritage Site of Old Rauma. The church stands by the small stream of Raumanjoki (Rauma river).

The exact age of the Church of the Holy Cross is unknown, but it was built to serve as the monastery church of the Rauma Franciscan Friary. The monastery had been established in the early 15th century and a wooden church was built on this location around the year 1420. Historians assume the current stone church was completed in 1515–1520. The Church of the Holy Cross served the monastery until 1538, when it was abandoned for a hundred years as the Franciscan friary was disbanded in the Swedish Reformation. The church was re-established as a Lutheran church in 1640, when the nearby Church of the Holy Trinity was destroyed by fire.

The church itself is a two-aisle church made of grey granite. The choir features fresco-secco style murals depicting the Biblical story of salvation. The paintings are from the time of Arvid Kurck, who was Bishop of Turku 1510–1522. The Bell tower was built in 1816. It was made of stones from the ruins of the Church of the Holy Trinity. The white steeple used to serve as a landmark for seafarers.
