= Rauma Old Town Hall =

Building in Finland

Coordinates: 61°07′40.5″N 021°30′40.5″E

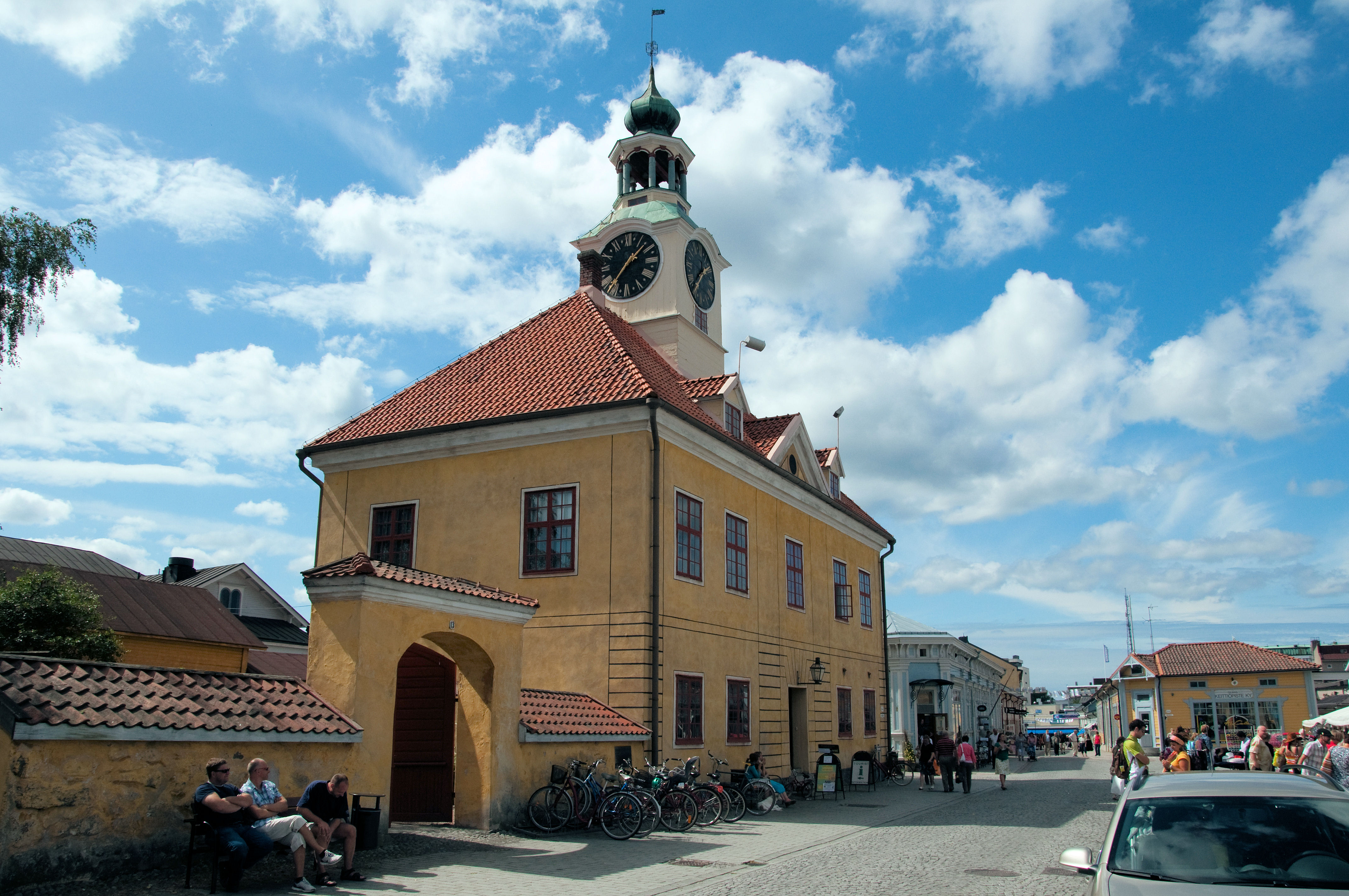
Rauma Old Town Hall is located by the market square

Rauma Old Town Hall is a building located in the UNESCO World Heritage Site of Old Rauma in Rauma, Finland.

The town hall was built in 1776 by the design of German architect Christian Friedrich Schröder. It represents late Baroque style, although the basic structure of two stories and a clock tower is common in the Medieval towns of Europe.

As the new town hall was completed in 1910, Old Town Hall has been the home of Rauma Museum. Porvoo and Rauma are the only preserved 18th century town halls in Finland.

== See also ==
- Porvoo Old Town Hall
- Tartu Town Hall
