= Ville Vallgren =

Finnish sculptor (1855–1940)

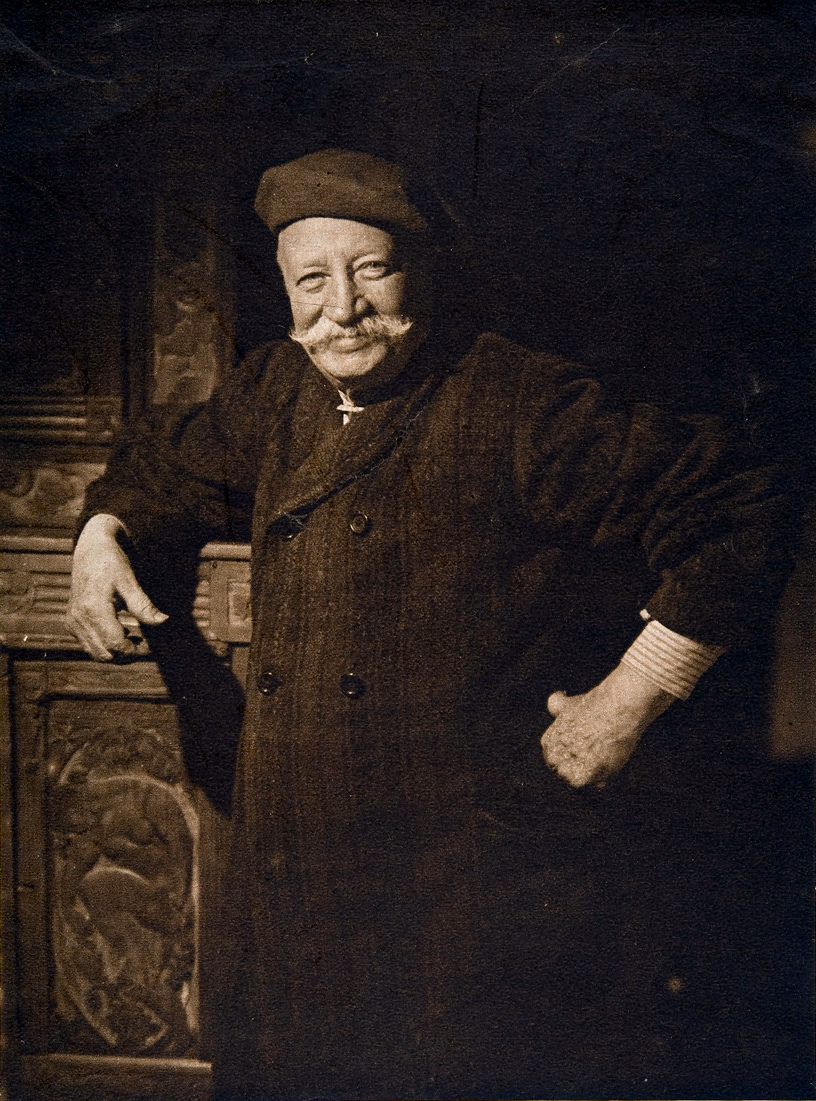
- Vallgren in 1930
- Born: 15 December 1855; Porvoo, Grand Duchy of Finland, Russian Empire (now Finland)
- Died: 13 October 1940 (aged 84); Helsinki, Finland
- Known for: Sculpture
- Spouses: Antoinette Råström (m. 1882; died 1911) Madeleine Imbert-Rohan (m. 1911; div. 1913) Viivi Paarmio (m. 1913)

Carl Wilhelm "Ville" Vallgren (15 December 1855 – 13 October 1940) was a Finnish sculptor. His best-known work is the statue Havis Amanda in Helsinki.

== Early life ==
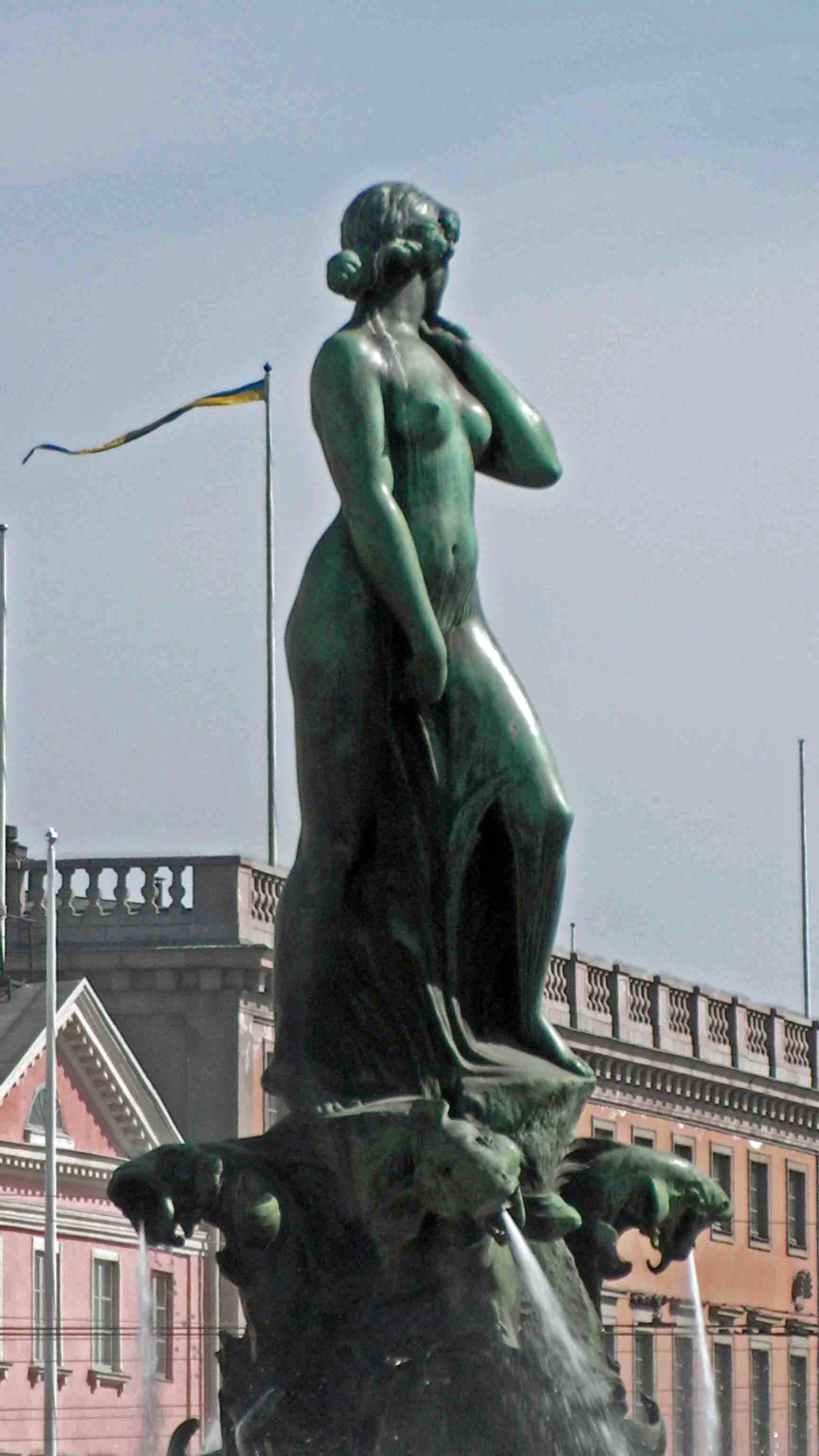
Havis Amanda, 1906 (reveal in 1908), his most famous work

He was born in Porvoo, and long resident in Paris, whither he went in 1878, after studying architecture in the Helsinki Polytechnic. He entered the École des Beaux-Arts, studied under Cavelier.

== Personal life ==
In 1882, he married Swedish sculptor Antoinette Vallgren, with whom he worked together. She died in 1911. The same year, he married French opera singer and painter Madeleine Imbert-Rohan, but the marriage was rocky from the start and ended only two years later. That year in 1913, he moved back to Finland, where he met and married his third wife, Finnish sculptor Viivi Paarmio.

== Death ==
He died on 13 October 1940 in Helsinki, and he was buried in Porvoo.

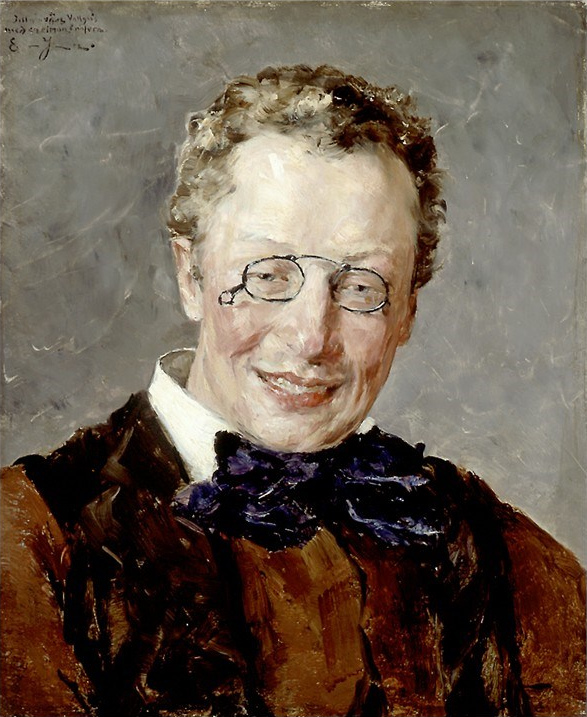
Portrait of Ville Vallgren, Ernst Josephson, 1880

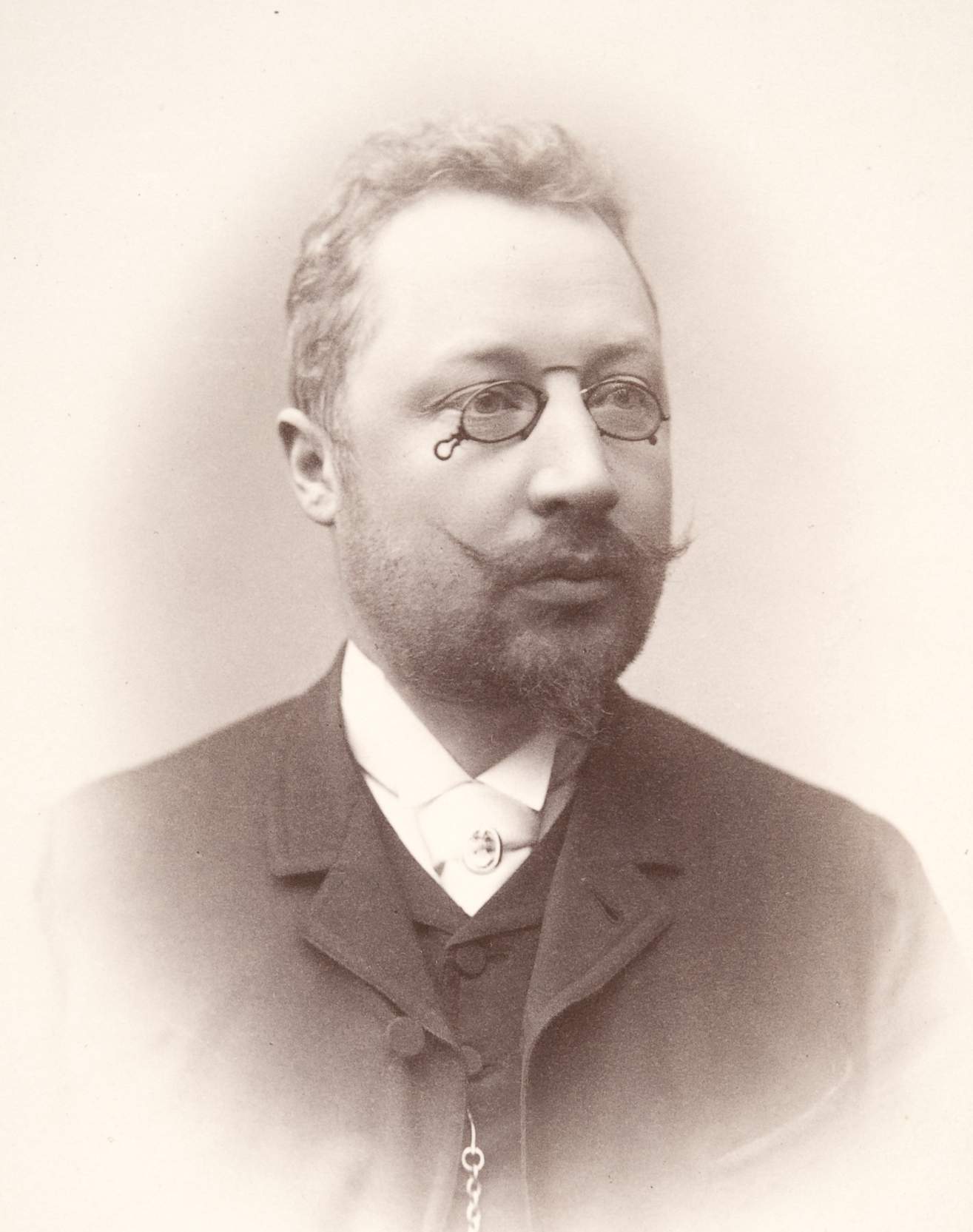
Portrait photograph taken in 1891

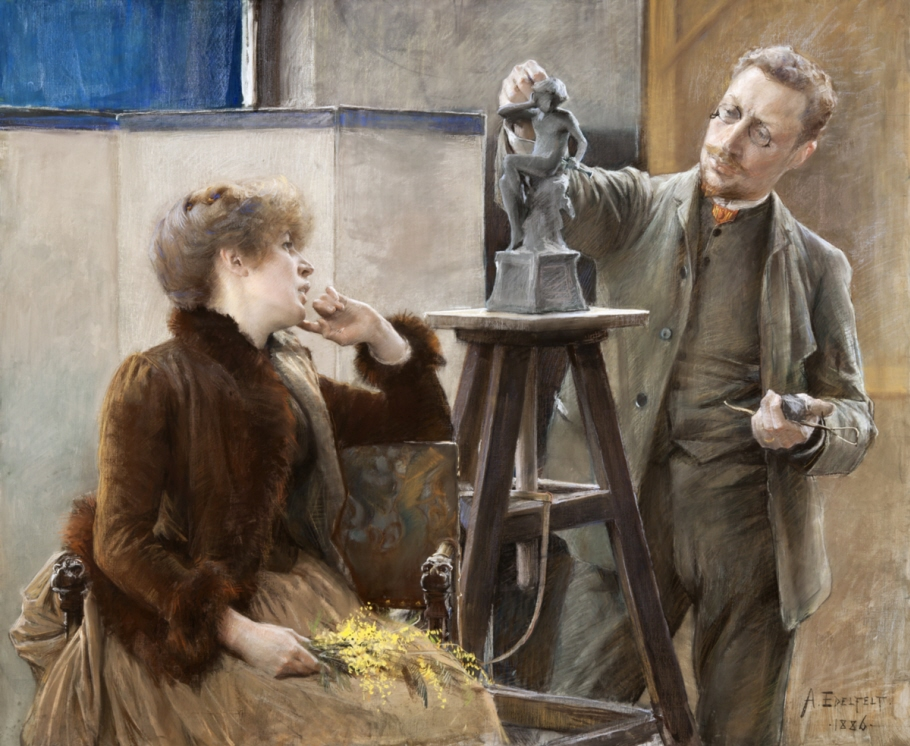
Working on the statue Echo with his sculptor wife Antoinette, Albert Edelfelt, 1886

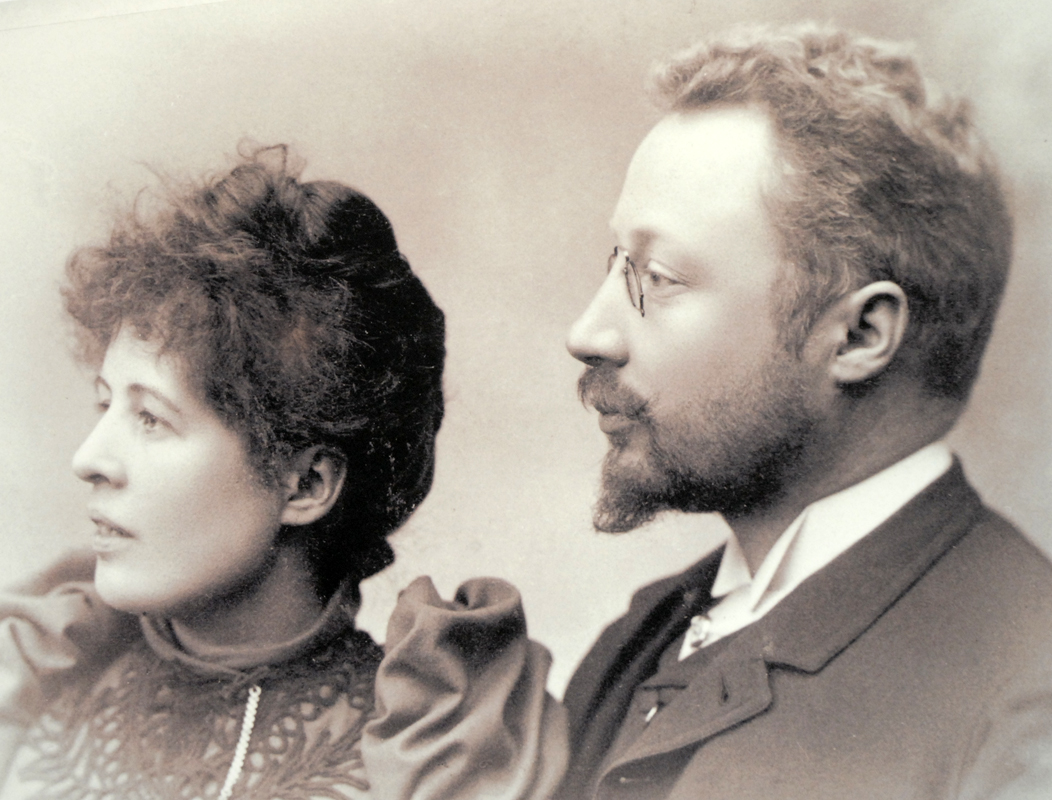
Ville Vallgren and his wife Antoinette in 1903

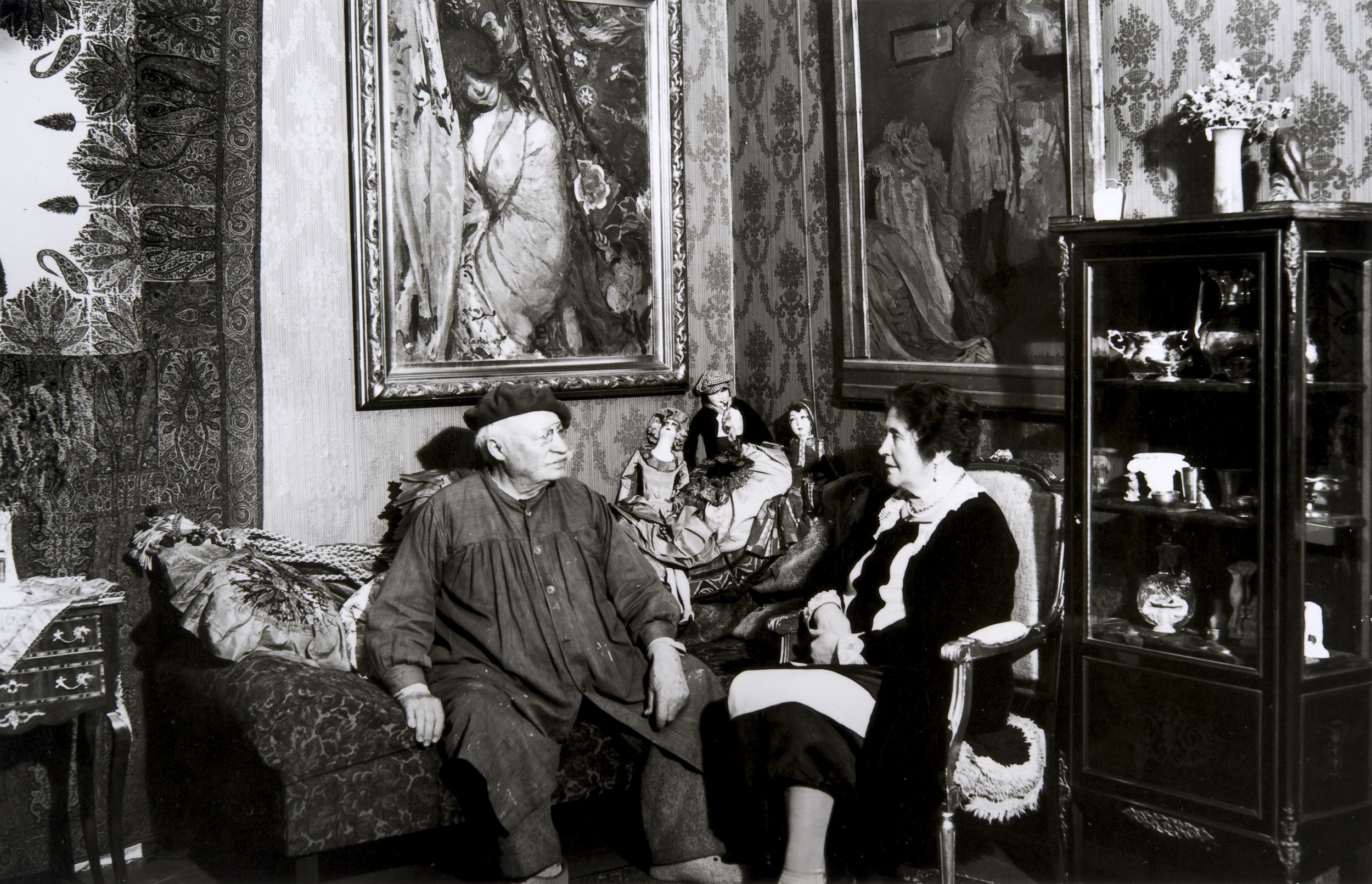
With his third wife, also sculptor Viivi in 1930

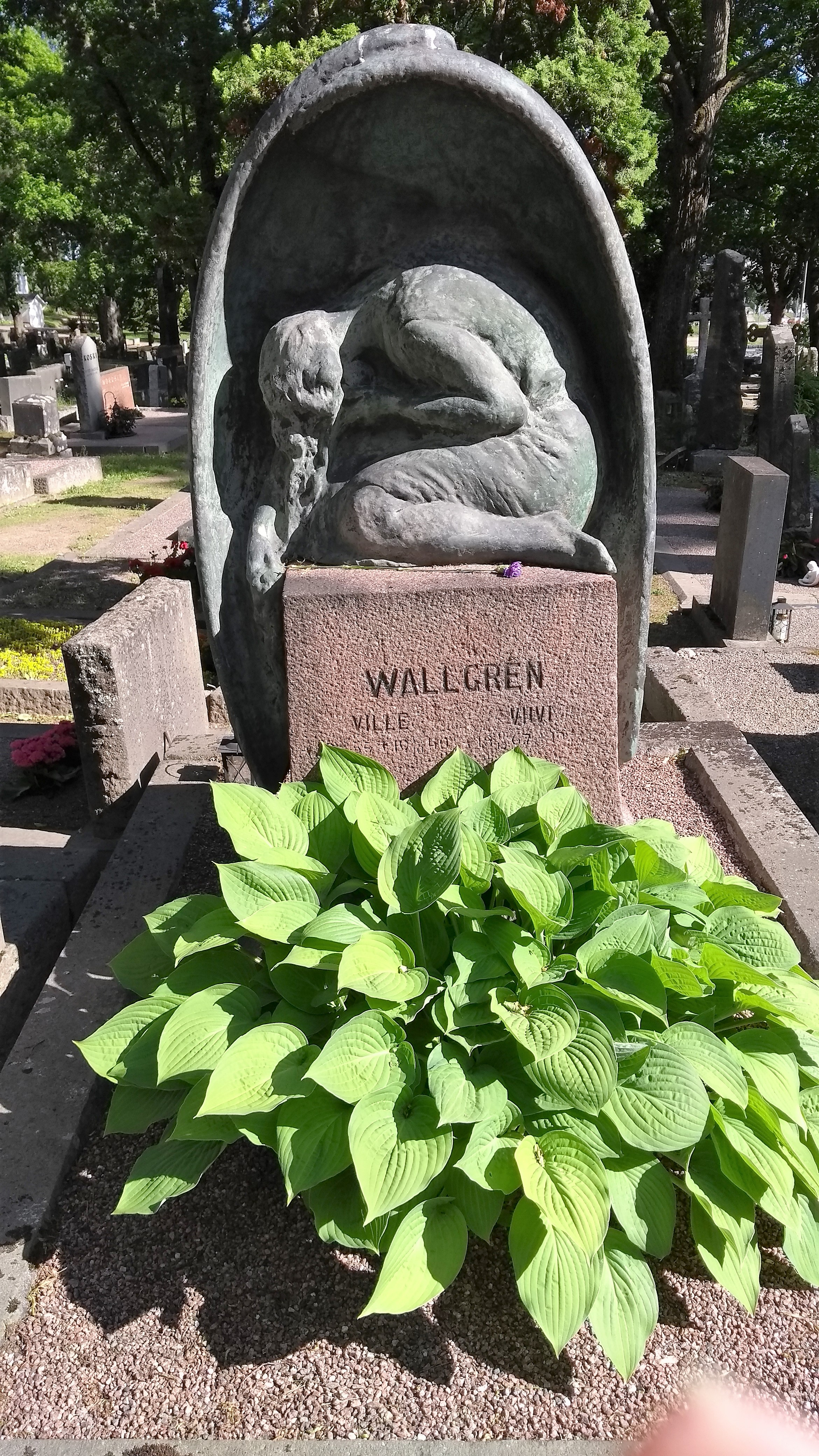
His grave, with a crying angel sculpted by Viivi

== Works ==
His mirrors, figurines, lamp stands, urns, and candelabra established his reputation as a decorative artist. Of his statues and portraits, several are in New York City in the Vanderbilt collection, notably Death and Resurrection and A Breton Girl. His works in Finland include a Mariatta, in the Imperial Castle, and a Christ in the National Museum at Helsinki. The marble group Maternity is in the Museum of Arras, and a bronze statuette, Youth, in the Berlin National Gallery.

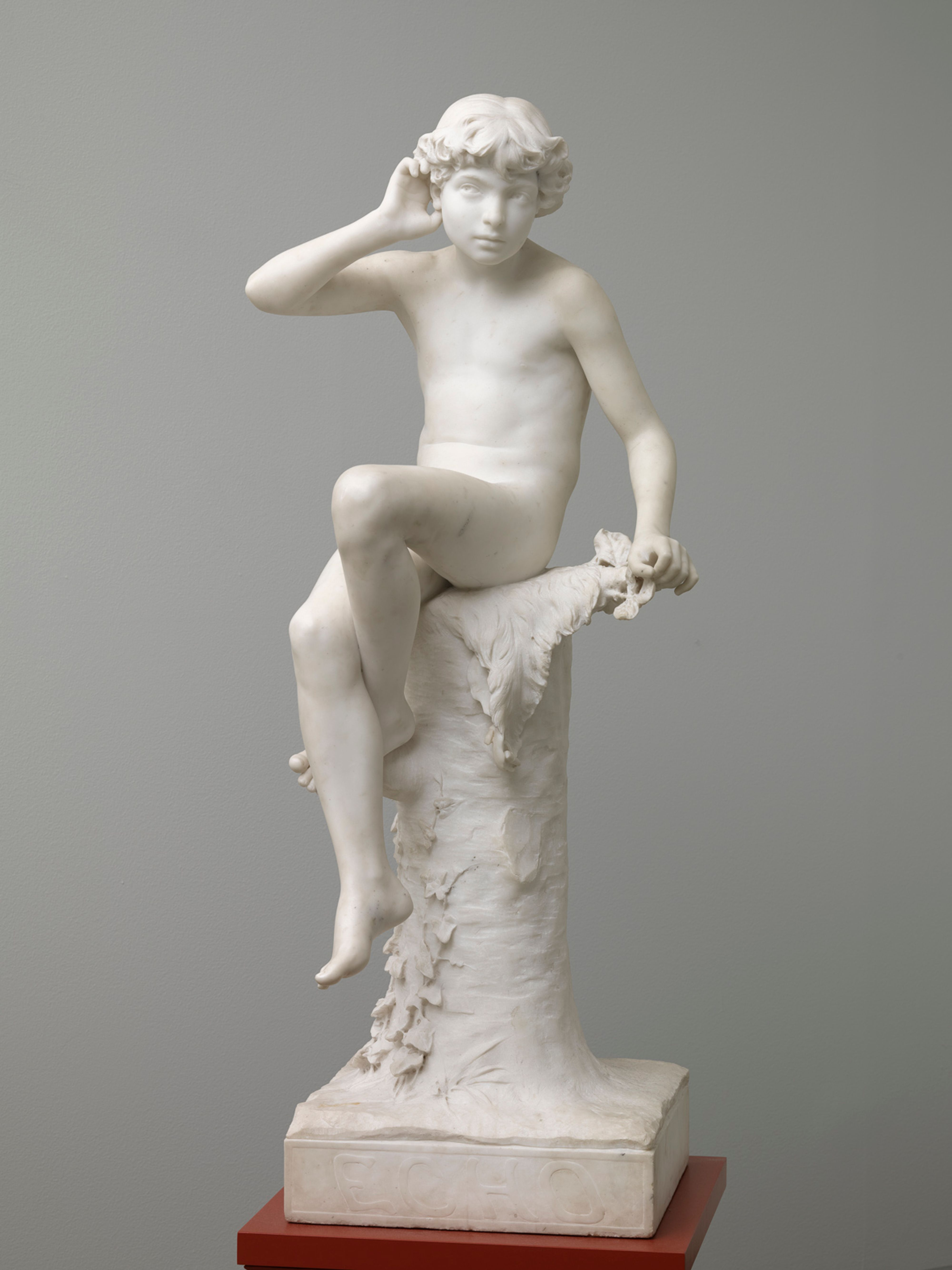
Echo, 1887

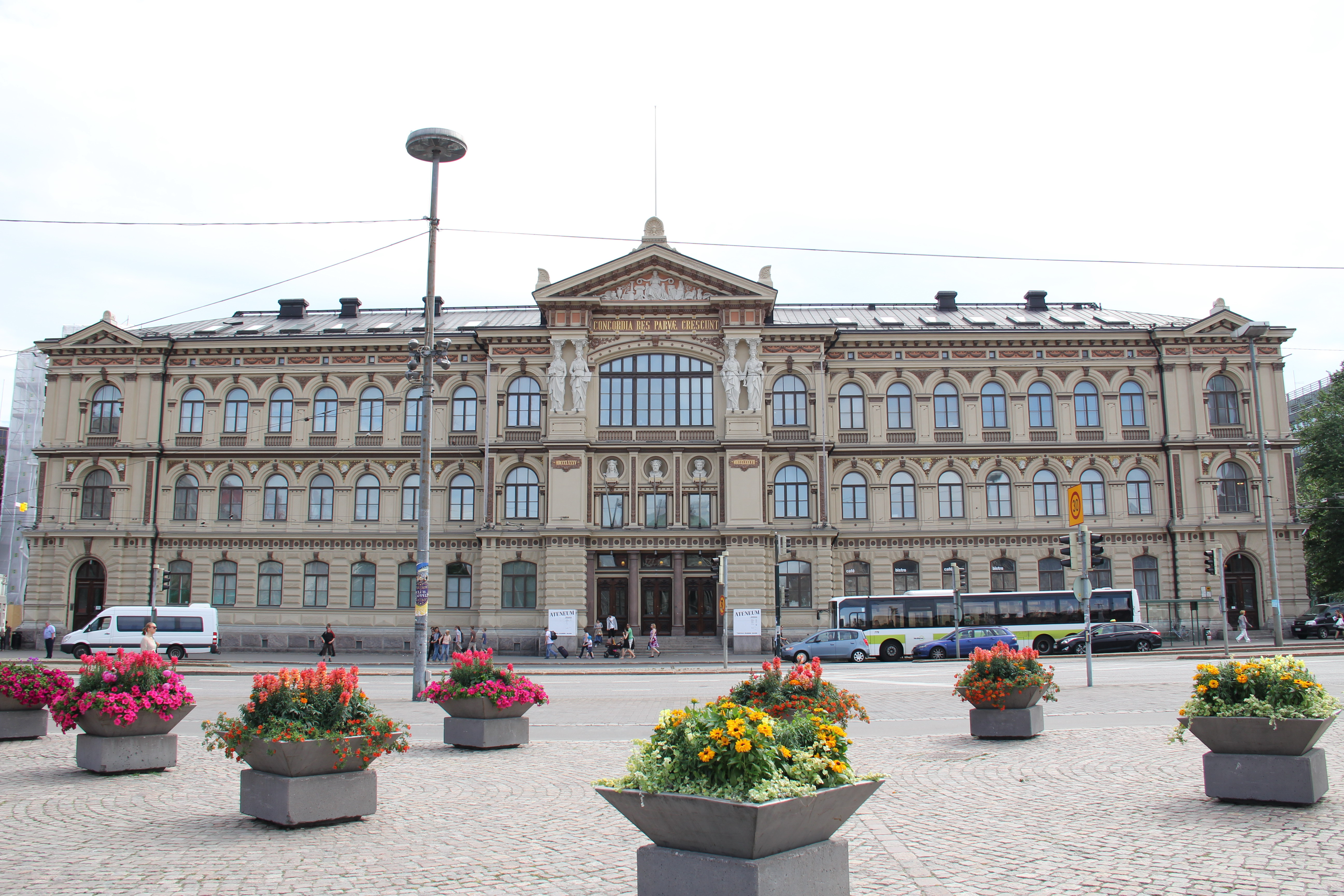
Main facade of Ateneum Art Museum worked on by multiple artists, with medallion sculptures by Vallgren, 1887

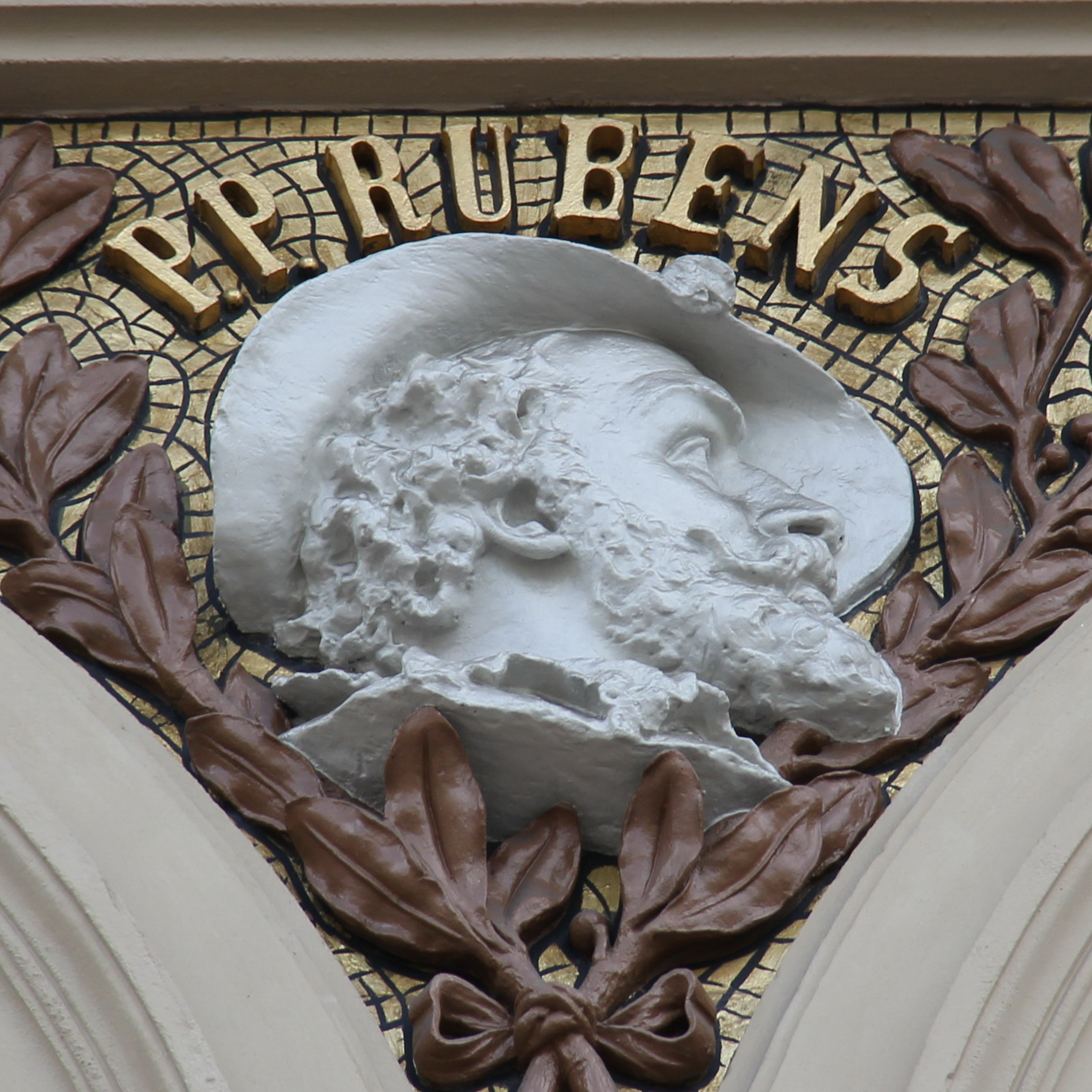
Close-up of Peter Paul Rubens' medallion

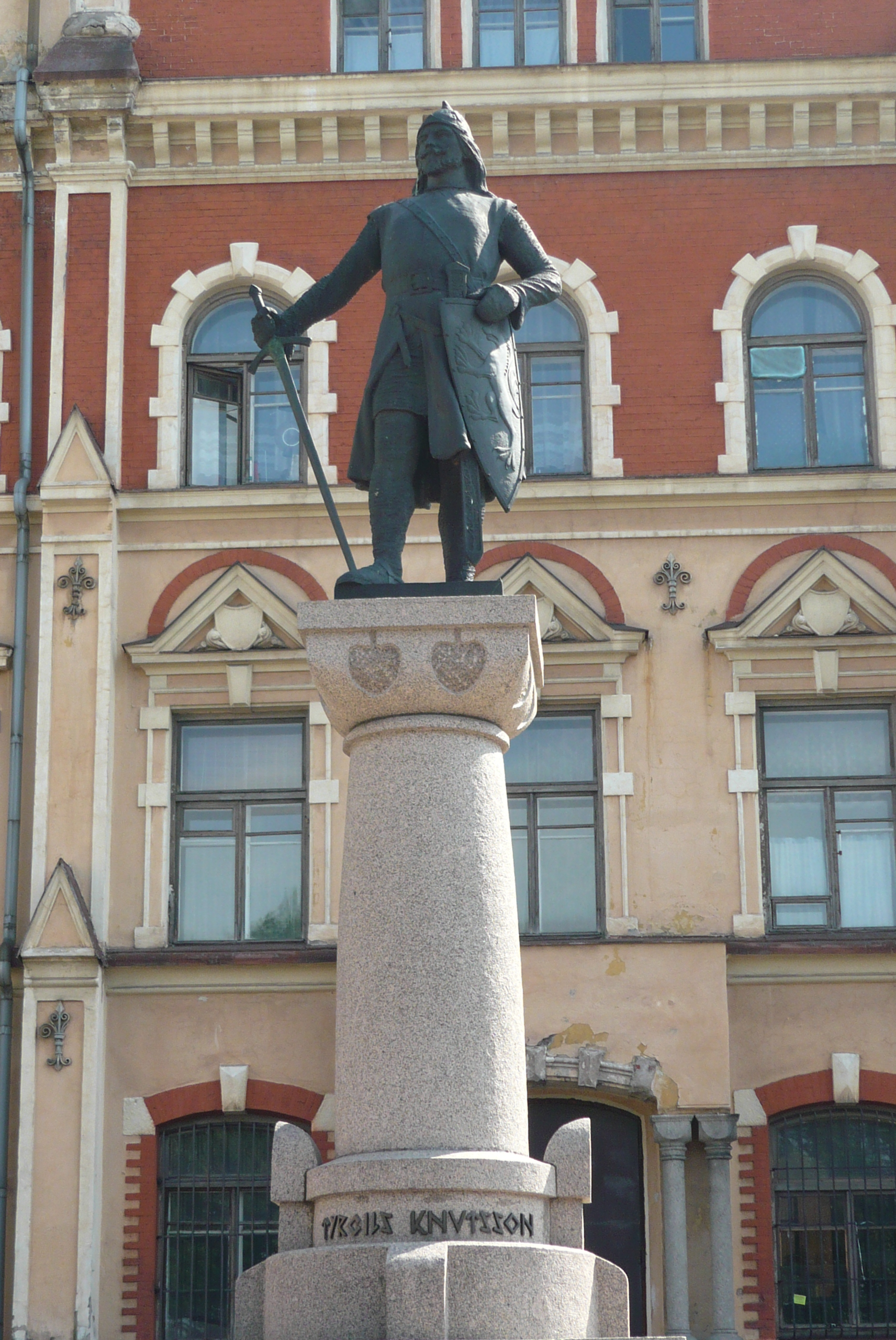
Statue of Torkel Knutsson in Vyborg, 1887 (public reveal in 1908)

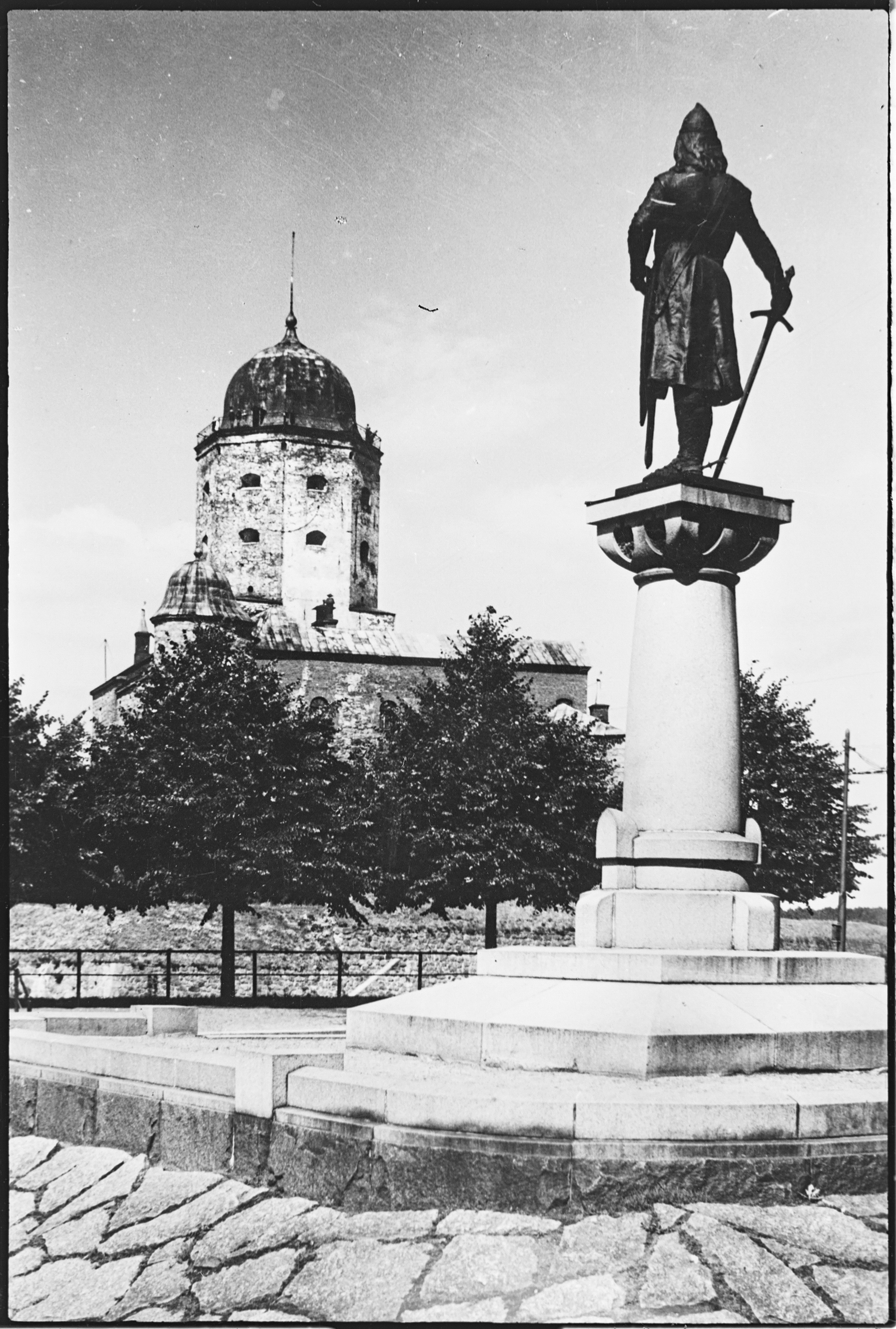
Knutsson's statue facing Vyborg Castle in the 1930s

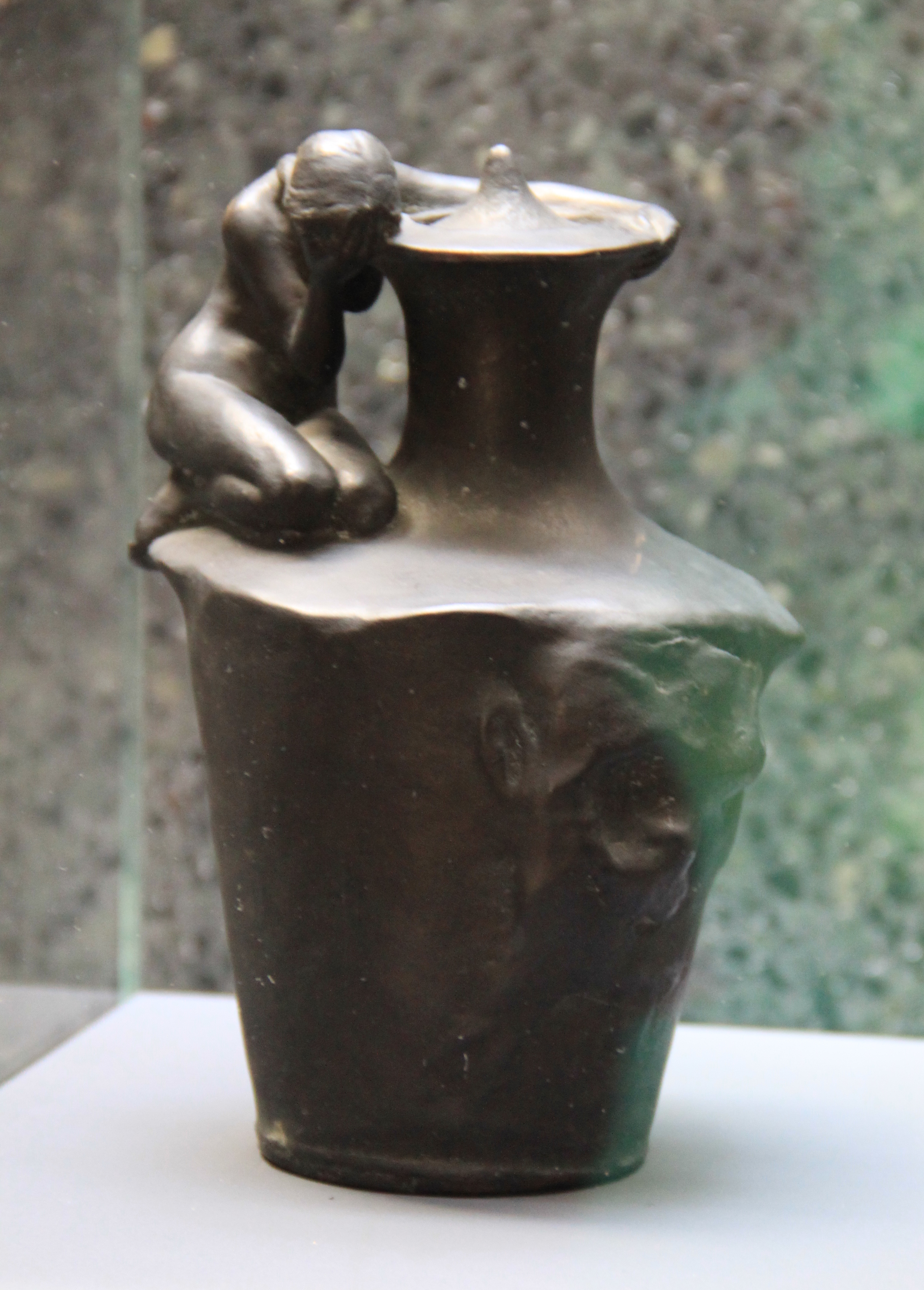
A funerary urn, 1892

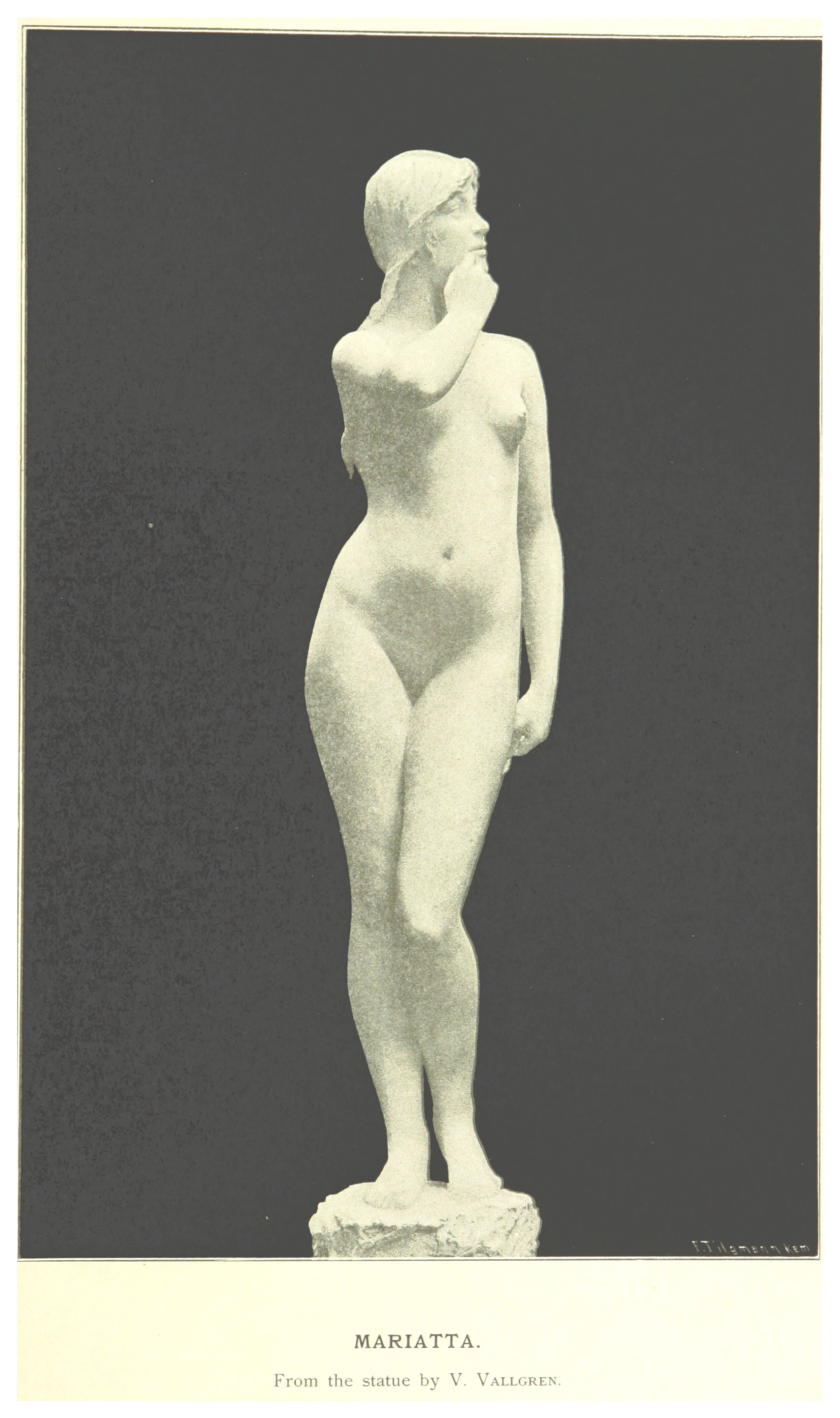
Mariatta, 1894

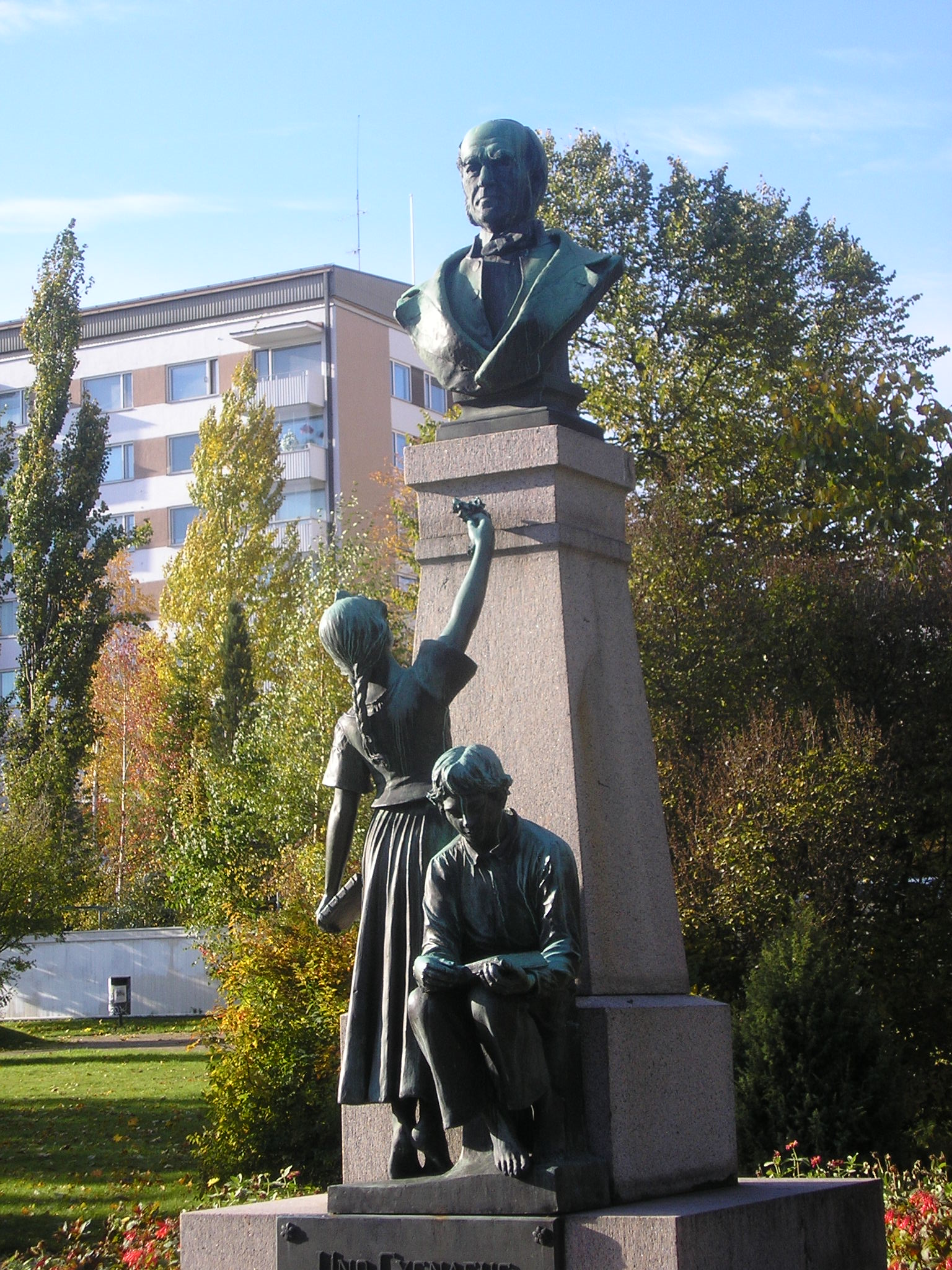
Statue of Uno Cygnaeus, 1899

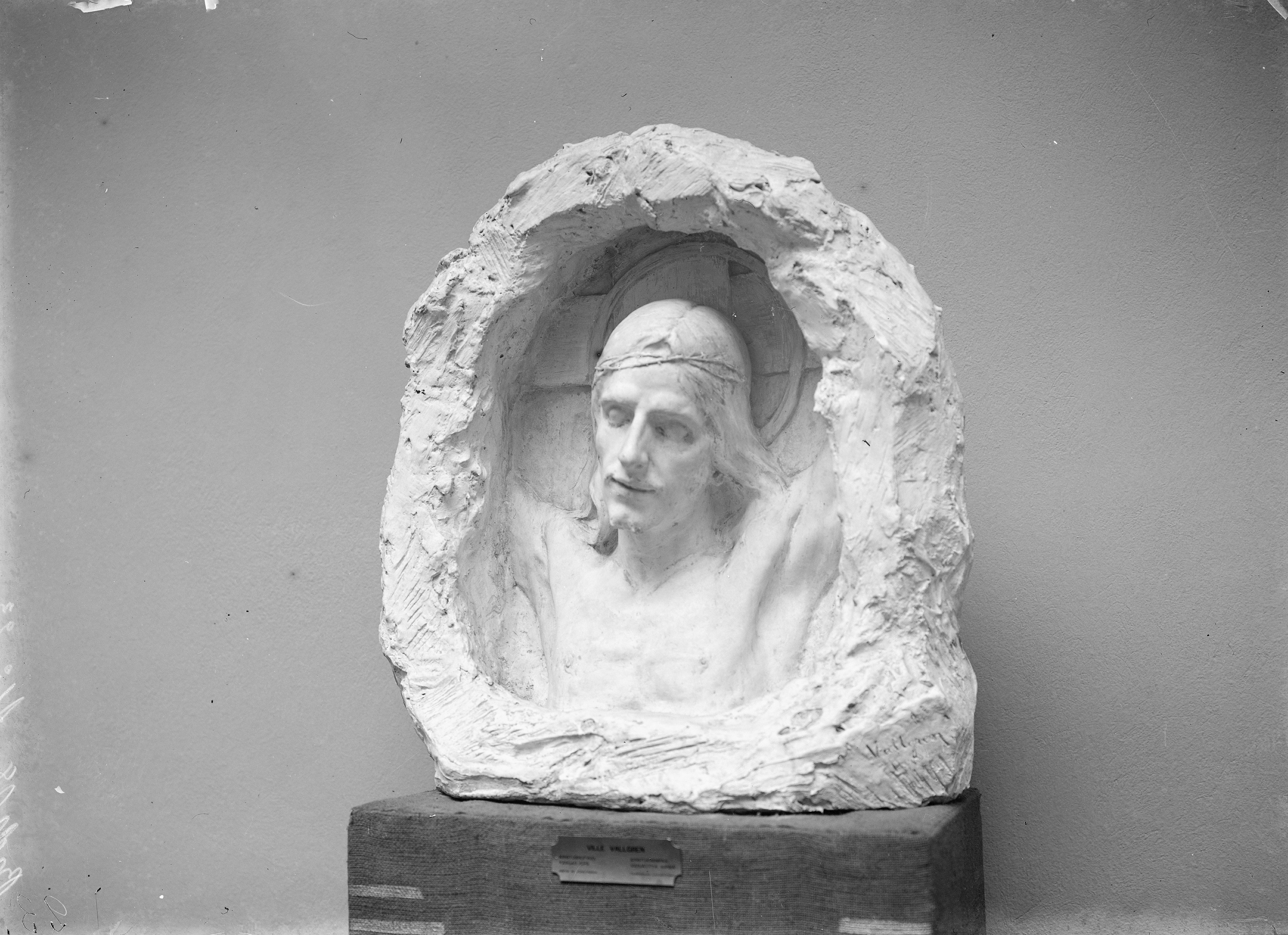
Christ, 1908

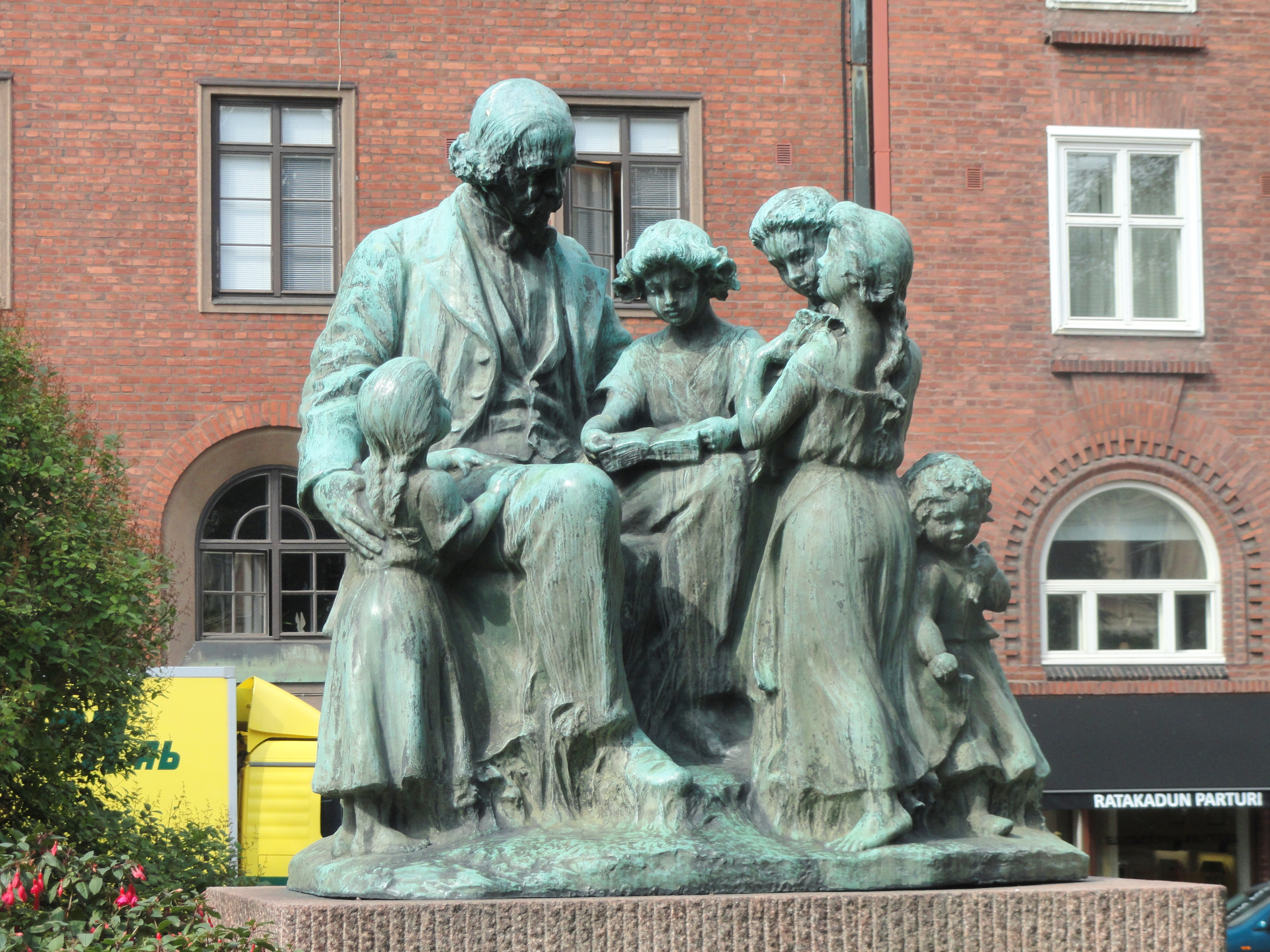
Topelius and children, 1909 (public reveal in 1932)

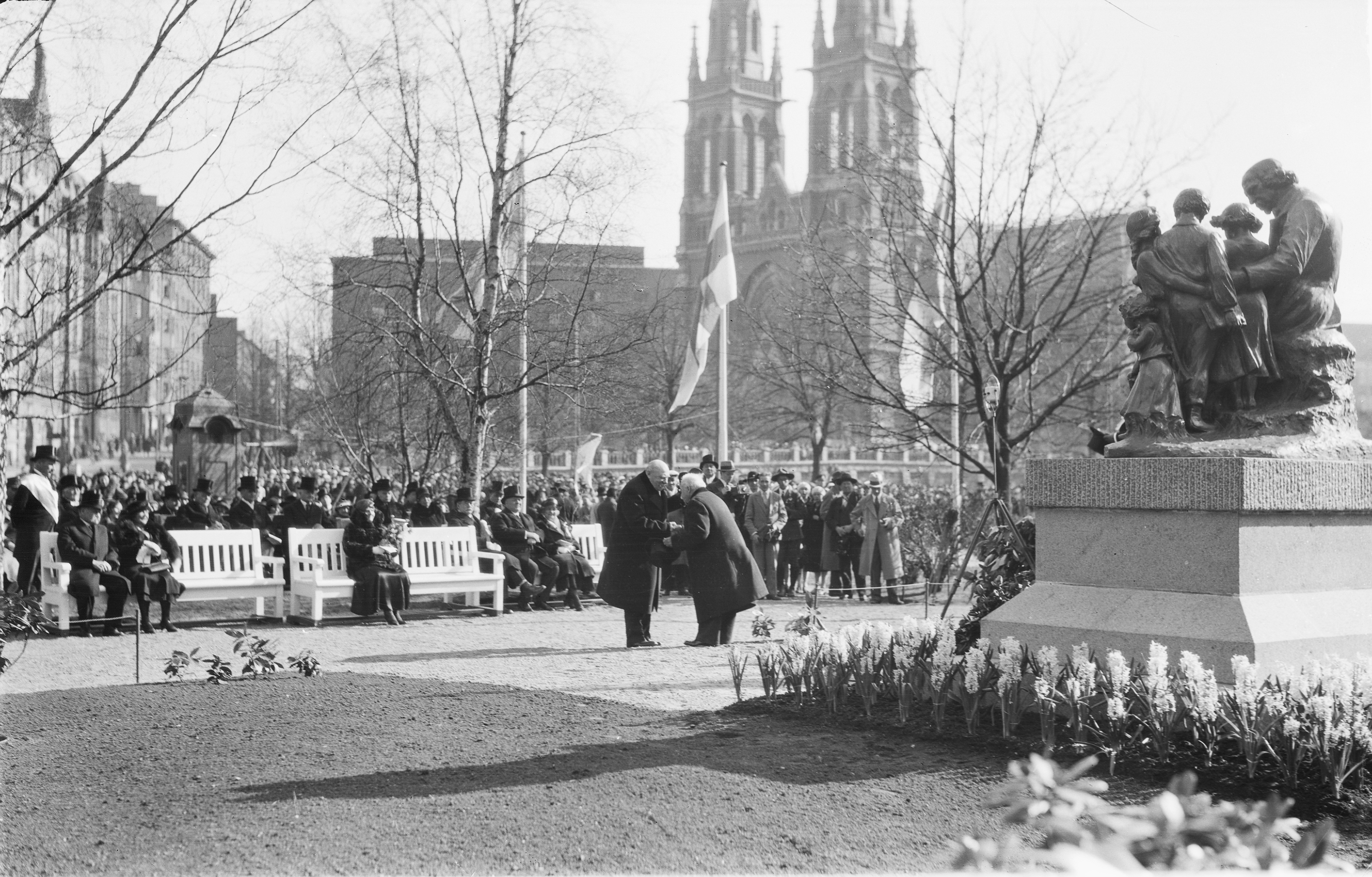
President Svinhufvud congratulating him for Topelius and children

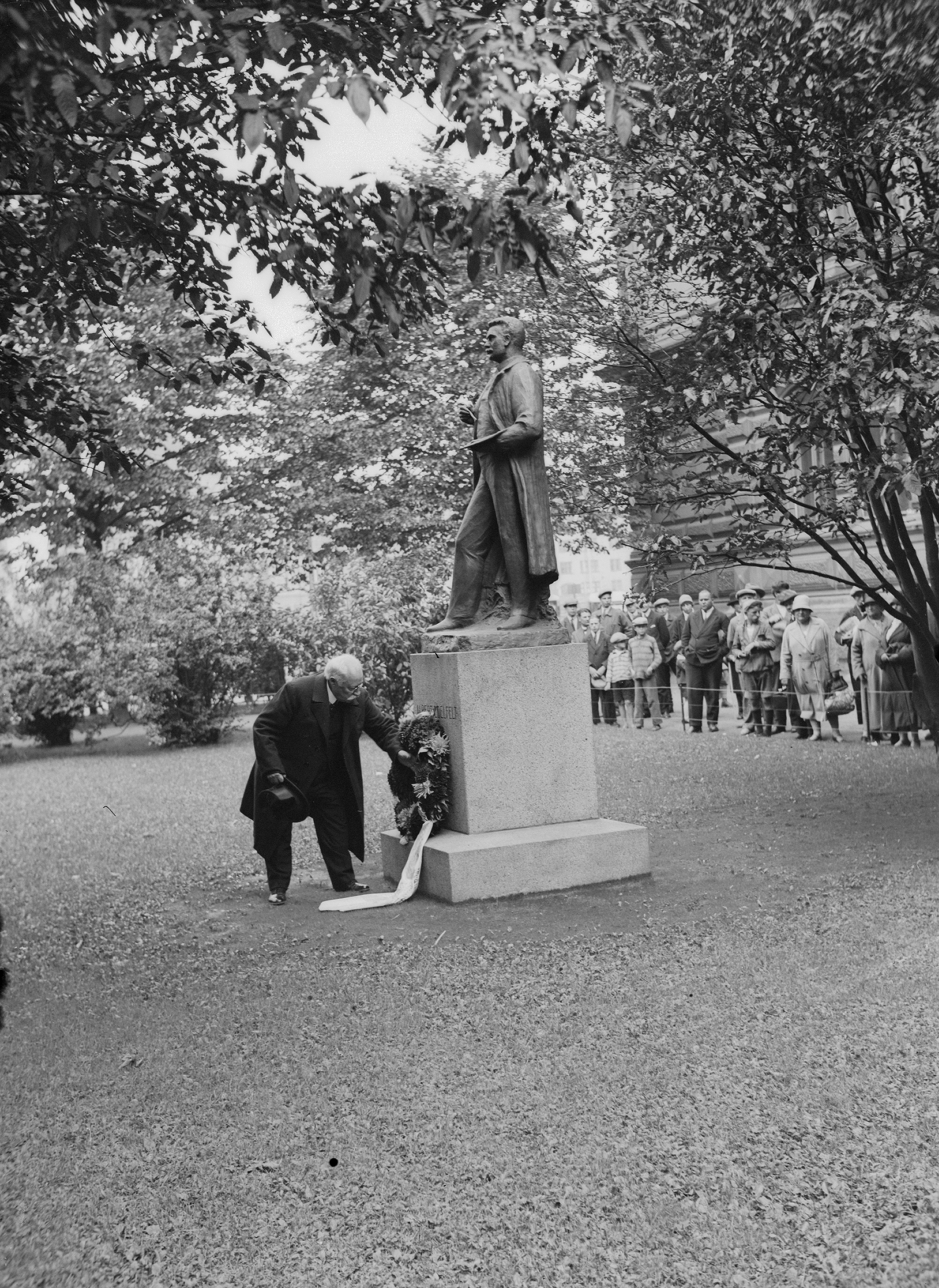
Setting a wreath by his statue of Albert Edelfelt in 1930

== See also ==
- Golden Age of Finnish Art
- Art in Finland
