= Kreeta Haapasalo Playing the Kantele in a Peasant Cottage =

1868 painting by Robert Wilhelm Ekman

- Kreeta Haapasalo soittaa kannelta talonpoikaistuvassa (Finnish)
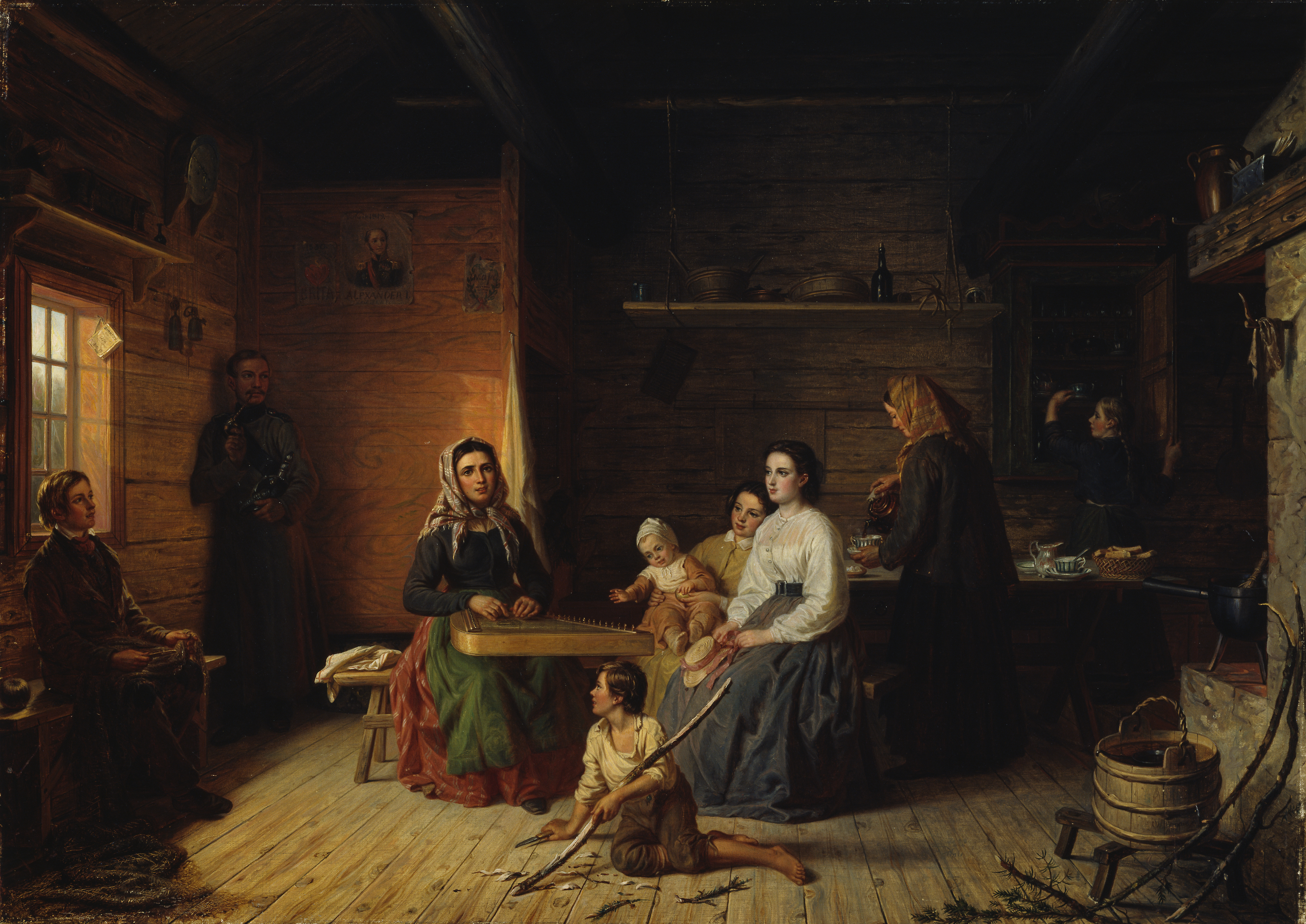
- Artist: Robert Wilhelm Ekman
- Year: 1868
- Medium: oil on canvas
- Dimensions: 75 cm × 105 cm (30 in × 41 in)
- Location: Ateneum; Helsinki
- Owner: Finnish National Gallery

Kreeta Haapasalo Playing the Kantele in a Peasant Cottage is an oil work on canvas painted in 1868 by Robert Wilhelm Ekman (1808–1873).

== Description ==
The dimensions of the painting are 75 × 105 cm. It was purchased for the collection of the Ateneum in 1869.

A number of people listen to a kantele playing. This includes the mistress of the house, young women and their children. Leaning in the corner is a pipe-smoking soldier. The environment is simple, related to their everyday chores, and lit by a daylit window. The work reflects an idealized vision of the Finnish nation and its values.

== Analysis ==
Kreeta Haapasalo was a well-known folk musician who in periods of famine in the 1860s fed a family by traveling as a kantele player, singing poetry. It brought her great popularity at a time of great interest in the roots of the Finnish people. Haapasalo was seen at the time as part of an ancient tradition as an interpreter of the Kalevala, through which she was able to get in touch with genuine Finnish culture.

Robert Ekman, the painter, was interested in the origins of Finnish culture. Ekman studied at the Stockholm Academy of Art. He was interested in historical development and the public life of the Finnish people. His genre paintings depicting it were well received. He returned to Finland on a permanent basis, after an Italian and French tour in 1845, after which he taught until his death in Turku drawing school, which he established in the following year.

== Sources ==
- Anja Olavinen: Robert Wilhelm Ekman: Kreeta Haapasalo soittaa kannelta talonpoikaistuvassa. Teoksessa Ateneum-opas. Toim. Timo Huusko. 2007, s. 17.
