= Ingeborg Malmström =

Finnish poet (1831-1919 )

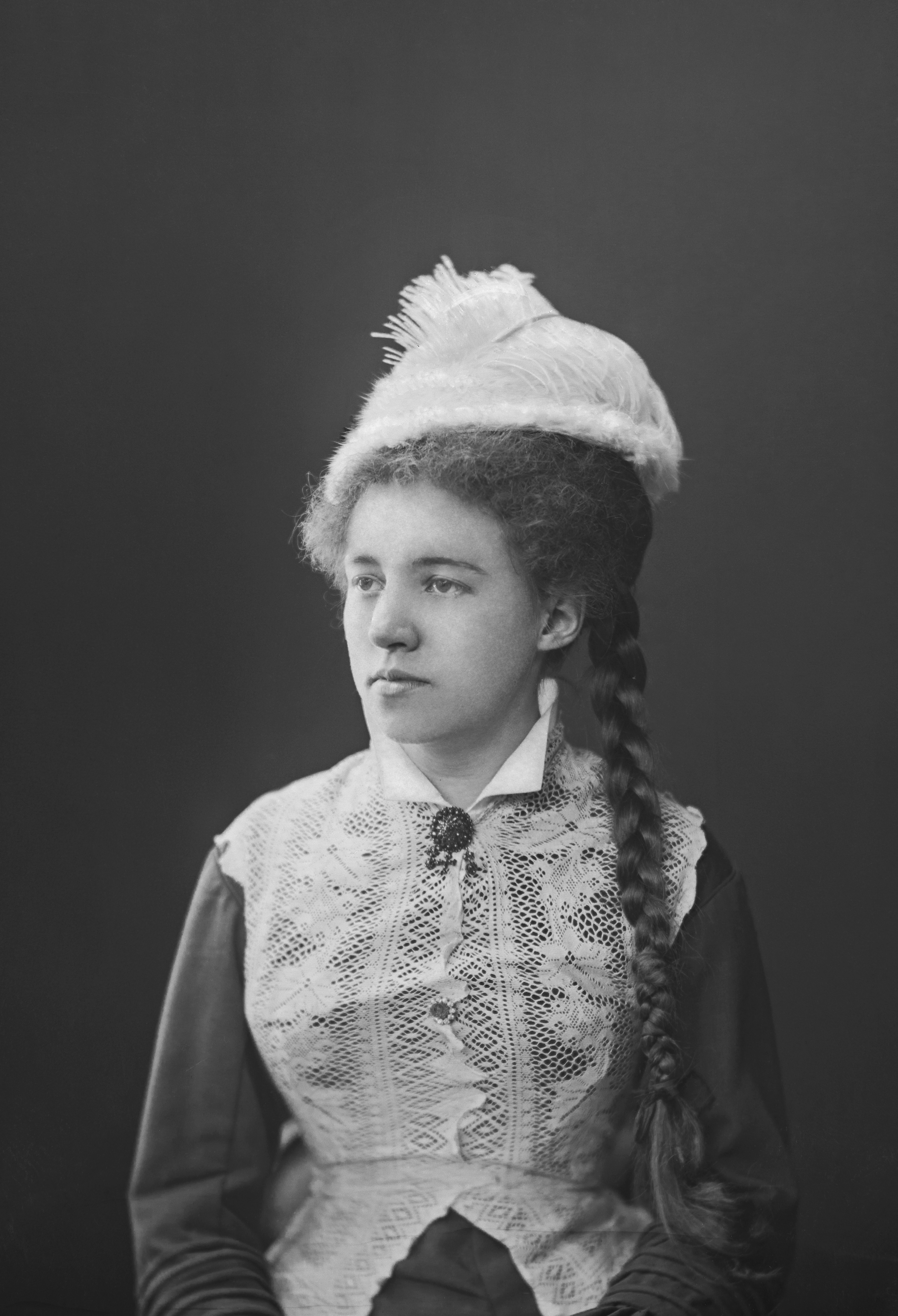
- Born: 1 January 1831 Oulu, Finland
- Died: 7 June 1919 (aged 88) Helsinki
- Occupation: poet

Lucina Konstantia Ingeborg Malmström, born Wallenius (1 January 1831 Oulu – 7 June 1919 Helsinki) was a Finnish poet who wrote in Swedish. she used the name Myosotis palustris.

Malmström was not only a poet, but also a painter who had received lessons from the famous church artist Robert Wilhelm Ekman. Malmström had painted the altarpieces of at least three churches, one of which is in Suodenniemi church. Malmström said that she also painted the altarpiece of Church of St. Lawrence, Vantaa in Helsinki, but it is generally considered to be the work of her teacher Ekman. Ingeborg Malmström was married since 1857 to the late Karl Robert Malmström.

== Works ==
Under the name Myosotis palustris

- Poems: Selections from a Naval Trial: Second Booklet; of Myosotis palustris. Author, Viborg 1899
- Poems: Selections from a Tore Sample: Third Volume; of Myosotis palustris. Author, Turku 1899
