= Mathilda Rotkirch =

Finnish painter

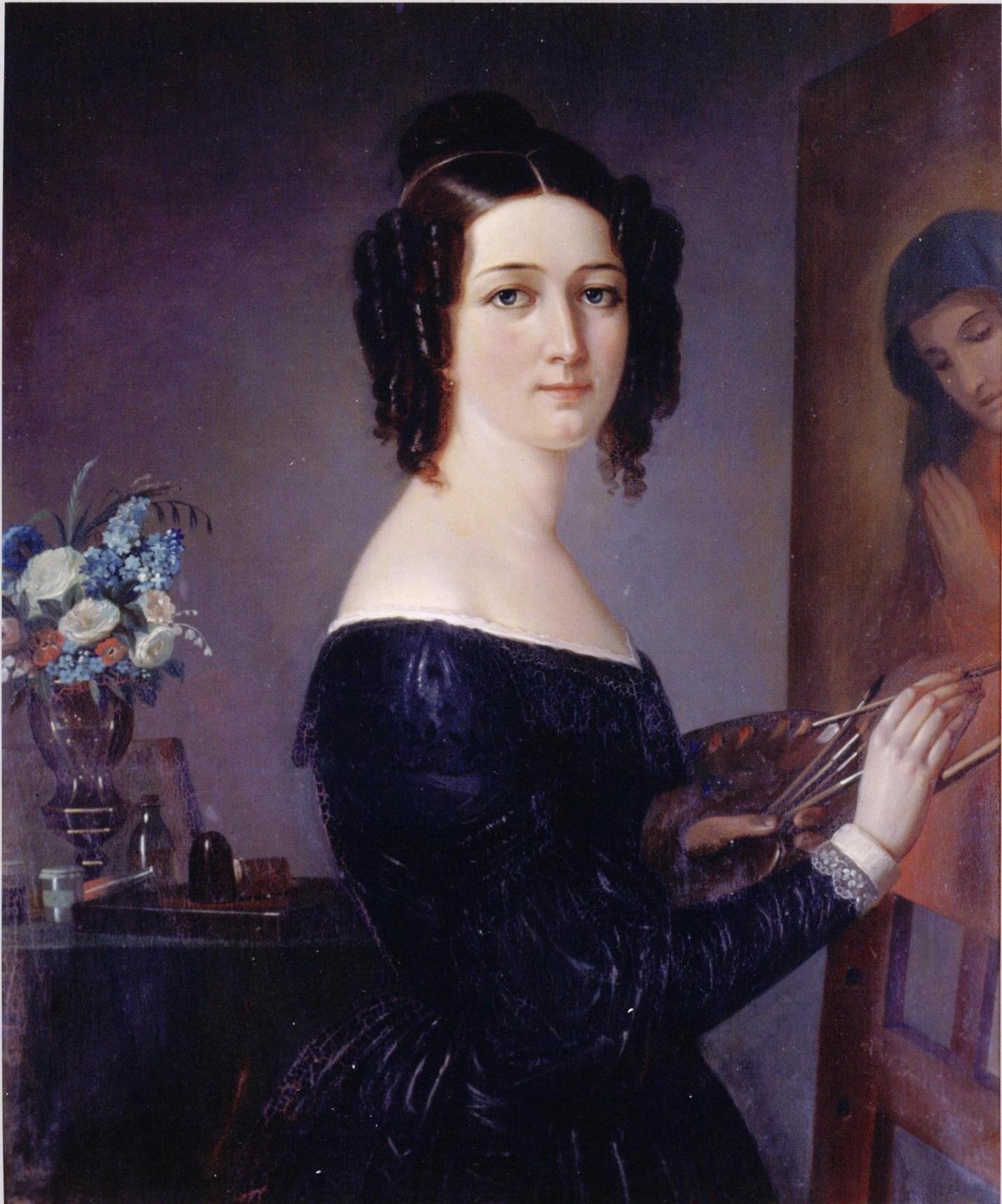
- Mathilda Rotkirch by Robert Wilhelm Ekman (1848)
- Born: 28 July 1813; Borgå (Porvoo), Grand Duchy of Finland, Russian Empire
- Died: 6 March 1842 (aged 28); Åbo (Turku), Grand Duchy of Finland, Russian Empire
- Known for: Painting

Mathilda Wilhelmina Rotkirch (28 July 1813 – 6 March 1842) was a Finnish painter. She is often referred to as the first female artist in Finland. She principally made portrait paintings.

== Biography ==
Rotkirch was born in Borgå (Porvoo), Finland. She was the daughter of Baron Karl Fredrik Rotkirch and Augusta Fredrika Elisabeth Rotkirch née Aminoff.

In the spring of 1833, she made her first study trip to Stockholm where she studied with Johan Gustaf Sandberg and Robert Wilhelm Ekman. She was a student at the Royal Swedish Academy of Arts between 1833 and 1838. She took a study trip in 1840–1841 along with artist Sophie Aminoff (1808–1862) and her husband Carl Reuterskiöld, on a journey through Europe. They visited Lübeck, Hamburg, Kassel, Strasbourg, Bern, Geneva, Milan and Paris, where she studied with the Swedish painter and designer Per Wickenberg (1812–1846).

She died of a lung ailment in Åbo (Turku) during 1842 at the age of 28. She was buried in the family graveyard at Näsebacken next to Borgå.

Rotkirch was represented in an exhibition in Finland in 1847. She is represented at both Ateneum and Cygnaeus Gallery.

== Literature ==
- Kuurne, Jouni: Mathilda Rotkirch: Taiteilija ja matkailija. 2002.
  - Jouni Kuurne; Teresia Ijäs (2002). Mathilda Rotkirch : konstnärinna och resenär / Jouni Kuurne ; [översättning från finska: Teresia Ijäs ...]. Skrifter utgivna av Svenska litteratursällskapet i Finland (in Swedish). Helsinki: Society of Swedish Literature in Finland. ISBN 951-583-077-X. ISSN 0039-6842. Wikidata Q113529993.
- Westermarck, Helena: Mathilda Rotkirch. Historiska och litteraturhistoriska studier 2, pp. 8–78. Svensk Litteratursällskap i Finland, Helsingfors 1926.
- Willner-Rönnholm, Margareta: Målarinnan Mathilda Rotkirch: En bortglömd pionjär? Finsk Tidskrift, 1/2003.
