= Robert Wilhelm Ekman =

Finnish painter (1808–1873)

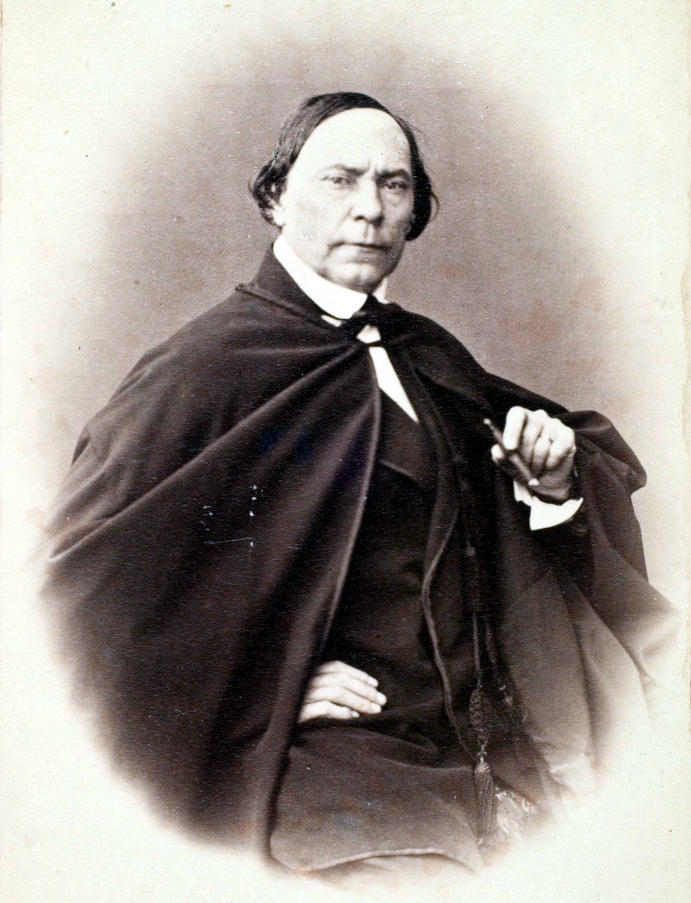
- Born: 13 August 1808; Uusikaupunki, Sweden (now Finland)
- Died: 19 February 1873 (aged 64); Turku, Grand Duchy of Finland, Russian Empire (now Finland)
- Known for: Painting

Robert Wilhelm Ekman (August 13, 1808 – February 19, 1873), a.k.a. R. W. Ekman, was a significant teacher and painter of the Finnish romantic portraits and early national romanticism.

== Childhood and Arts Education ==
Robert Ekman was born in Uusikaupunki, Finland to an upper-class family. His father was Carl Christoffer Ekman, a medical doctor and a mayor, and his mother was Sara Elisabet (maiden name Gadolin). Both of his parents died when he was approximately 10 years old. They left behind five orphans who were placed in foster homes. Their schooling was incomplete and there was no chance of higher academic education.

Robert Ekman first studied art under the guidance of Finnish painter Gustaf Wilhelm Finnberg (1784–1833), but in 1824 together with his brother Fredric, Joachim begun studies at the Royal Swedish Academy of Arts in Stockholm and later studied in the studio of Johan Gustaf Sandberg (1782–1854). Already as a student Ekman specialized in portraying the life of the common people, instead of Classicism of the academic arts. Ekman graduated in 1836, and was granted a generous traveling scholarship for excelling in his studies. This supported him working in the Netherlands, France and Italy between years 1837–1844. As the scholarship was not plausible otherwise, Ekman took Swedish citizenship.

== Court Painter and a Teacher ==
Upon returning to Stockholm, Ekman was dubbed as an agré (member candidate) and was accepted as a member of the academy in 1844. The title included the one of royal court and history painter. In 1845 Ekman returned to Turku, where he began decorating the Turku Cathedral with wall paintings. The laborious fresco were finished in 1854. Additionally, he completed over 30 church altarpieces during his career including works at Helsinki (1846–1848), Sääksmäki (1847), Viitasaari (1849), Sauvon (1853), Oulu (1859), Tammela (1860), Vaasa (1861), Pori (1863), Paimio (1865), Tyrvää (1866) and Perelt (1871).

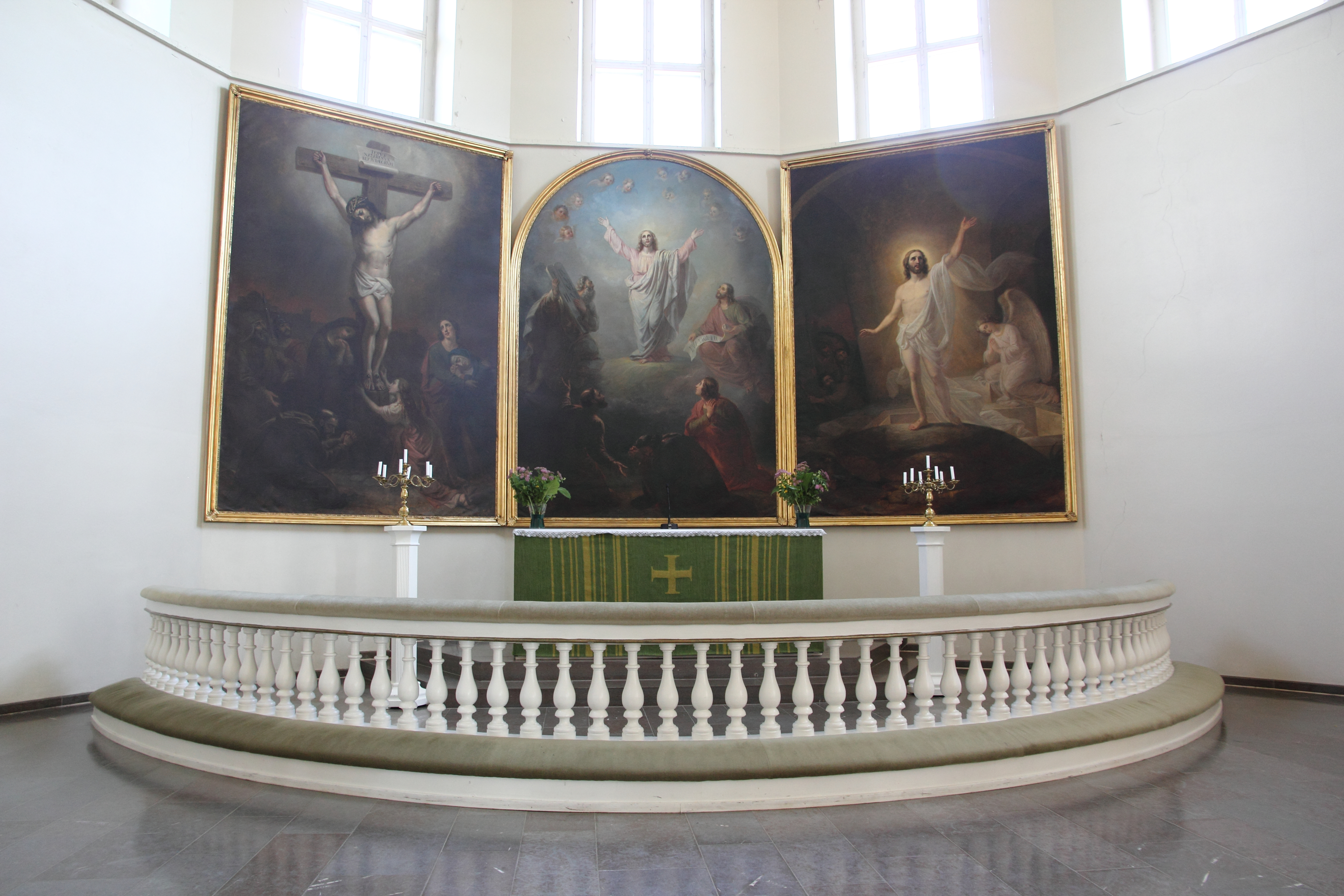
Triptych altarpiece at Tyrvää Church, 1866

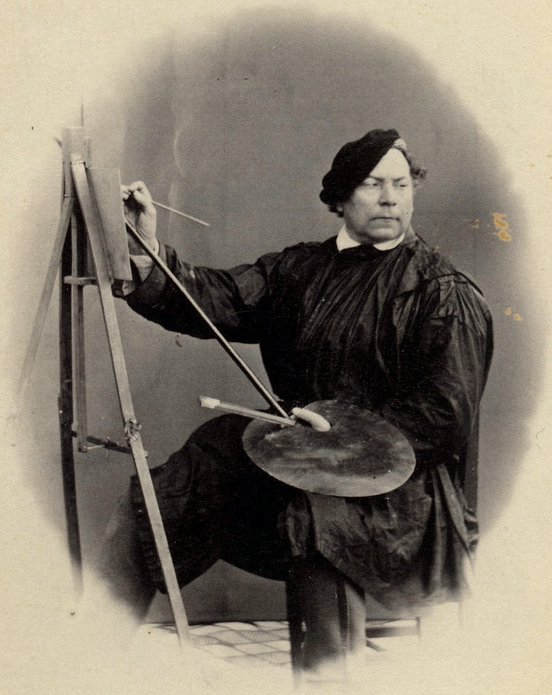
Photograph of Ekman painting in the 1860s

Having lived in Finland for ten years, Ekman regained Finnish citizenship in 1855. Having moved to Turku, Ekman started working on art education with master painter Carl Gustaf Söderstrand (1800–1862). In 1846 the Turku School of Drawing was founded and led by Ekman until his death. He died at Turku during 1873.

Ingeborg Malmström was one of the student of him.

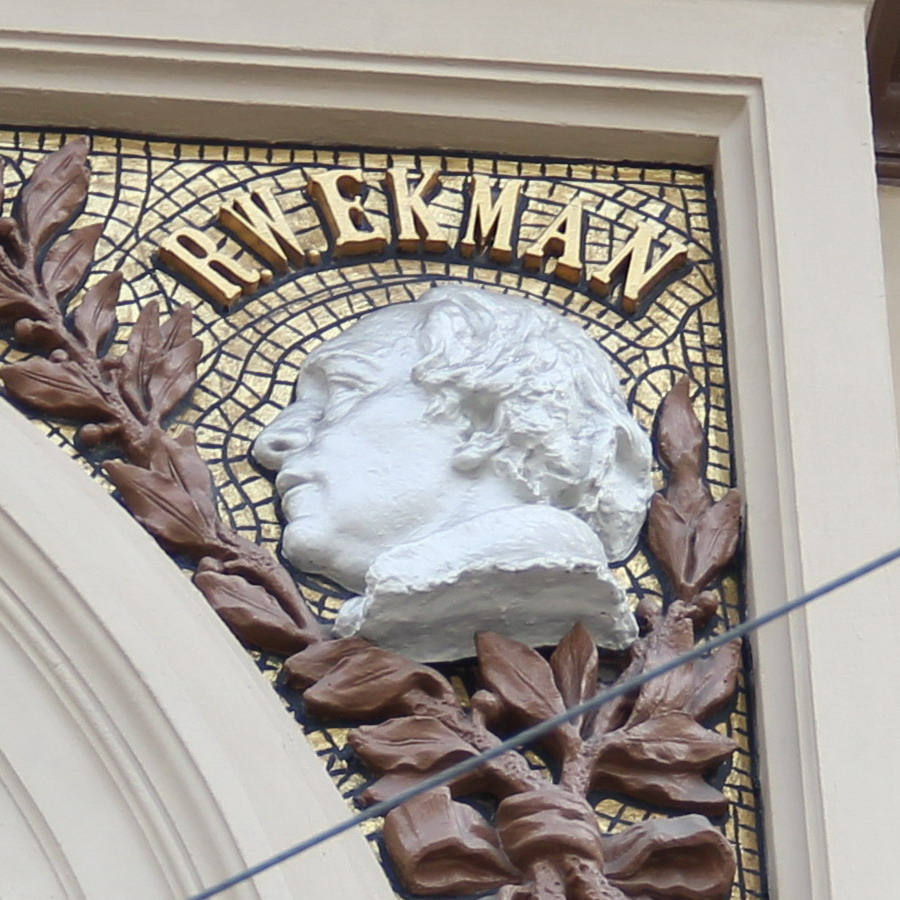
Medallion of Ekman on the facade of Ateneum by Ville Vallgren, 1887

== Works ==
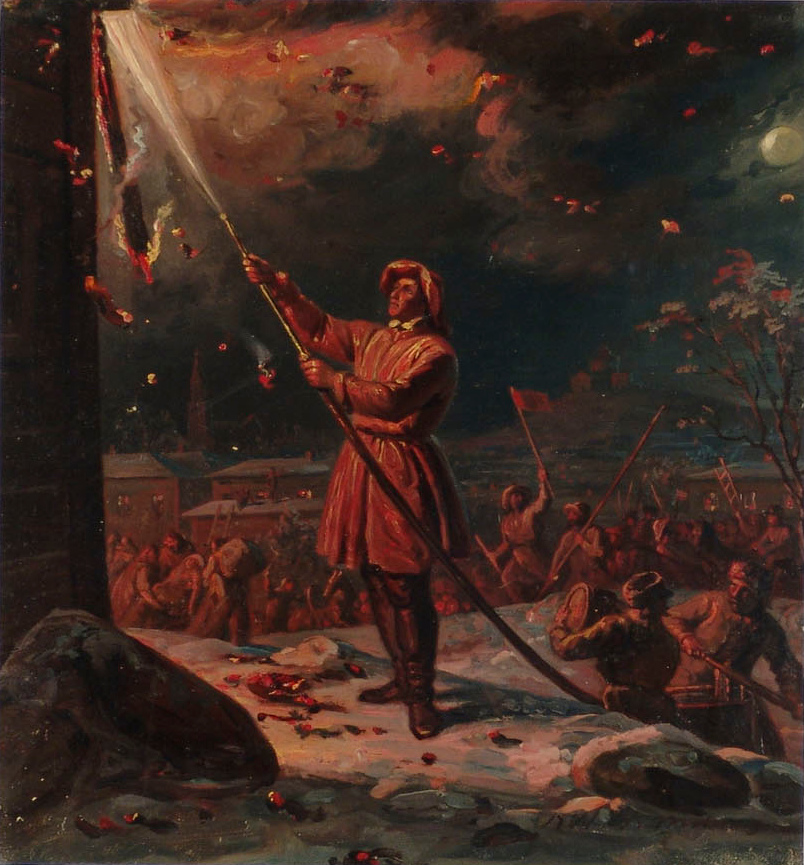
Great Fire of Turku

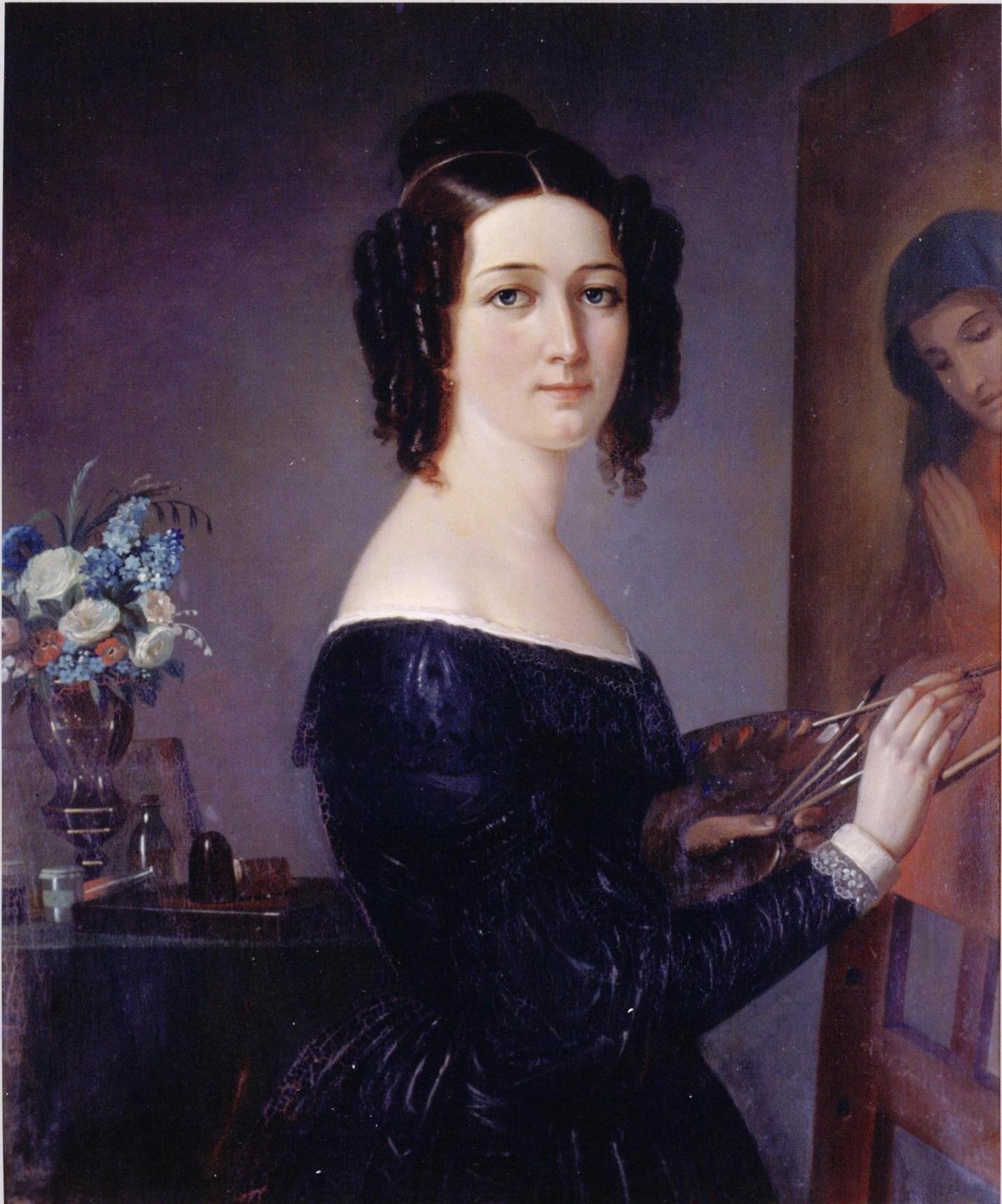
Portrait of Mathilda Rotkirch, 1848

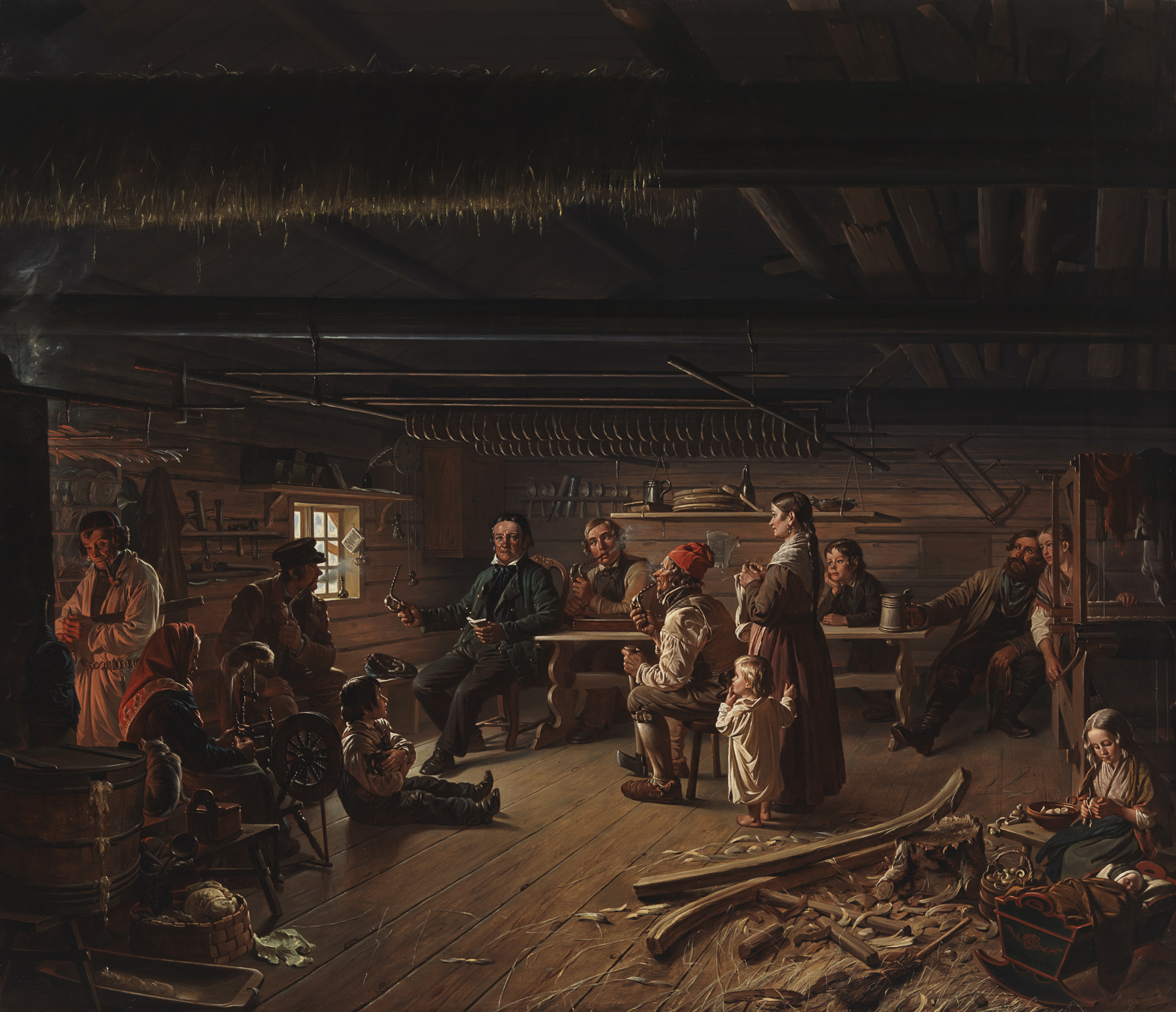
Pentti Lyytinen Recites Poems in a Cottage in Savo

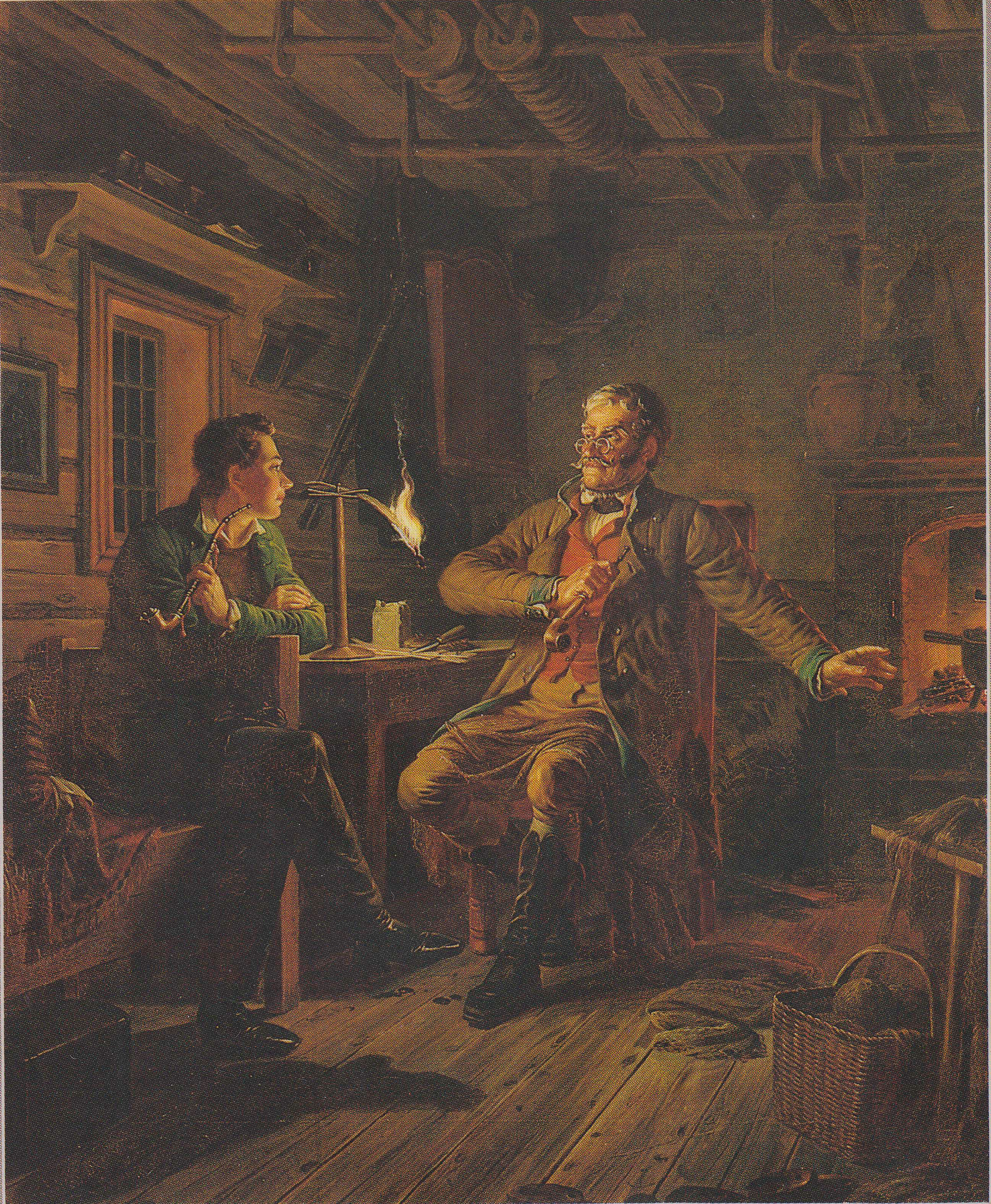
Ensign Stål and the Undergraduate, 1853

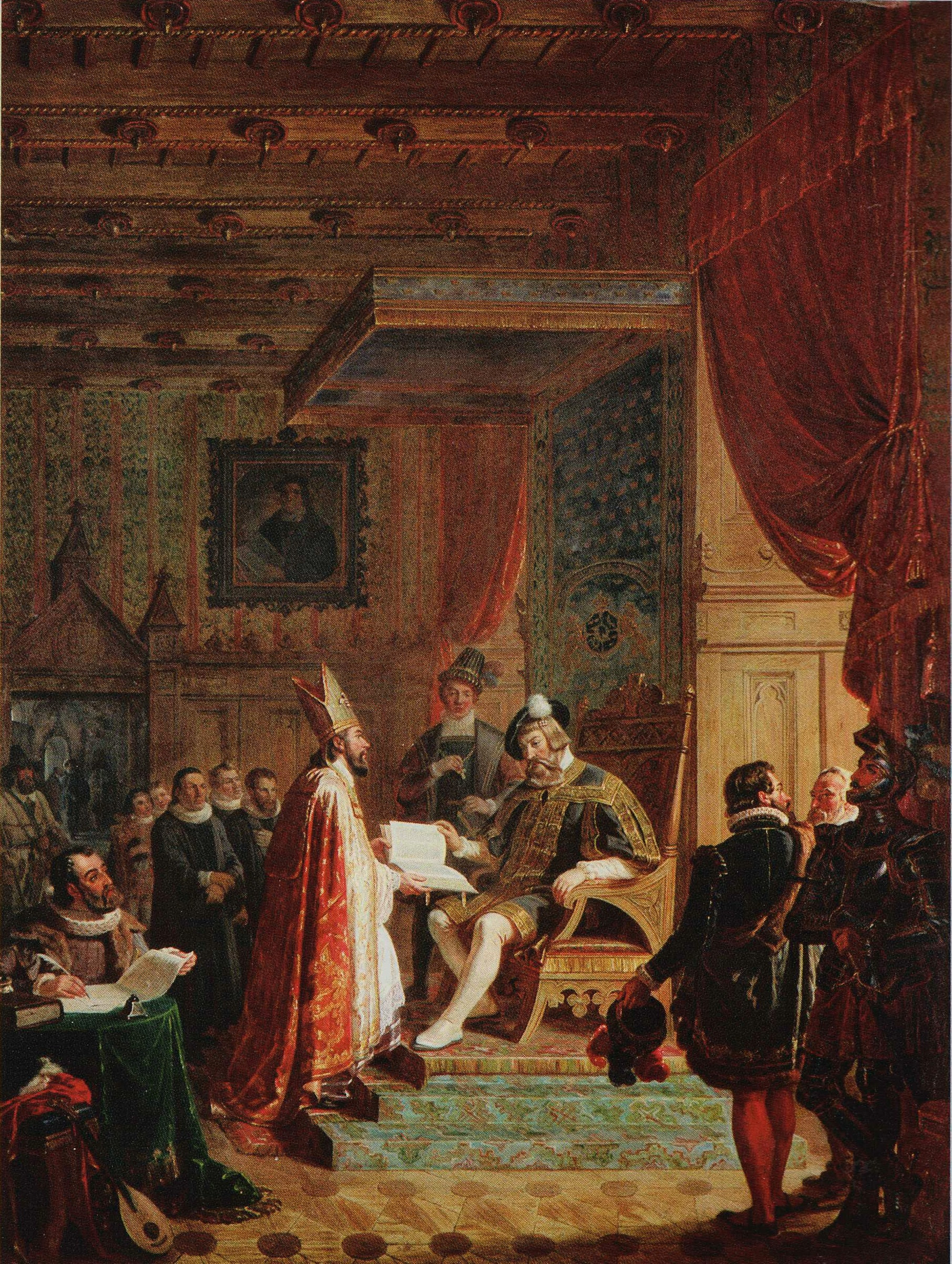
Mikael Agricola Hands Over the Finnish Translation of the New Testament to King Gustav Wasa, 1853

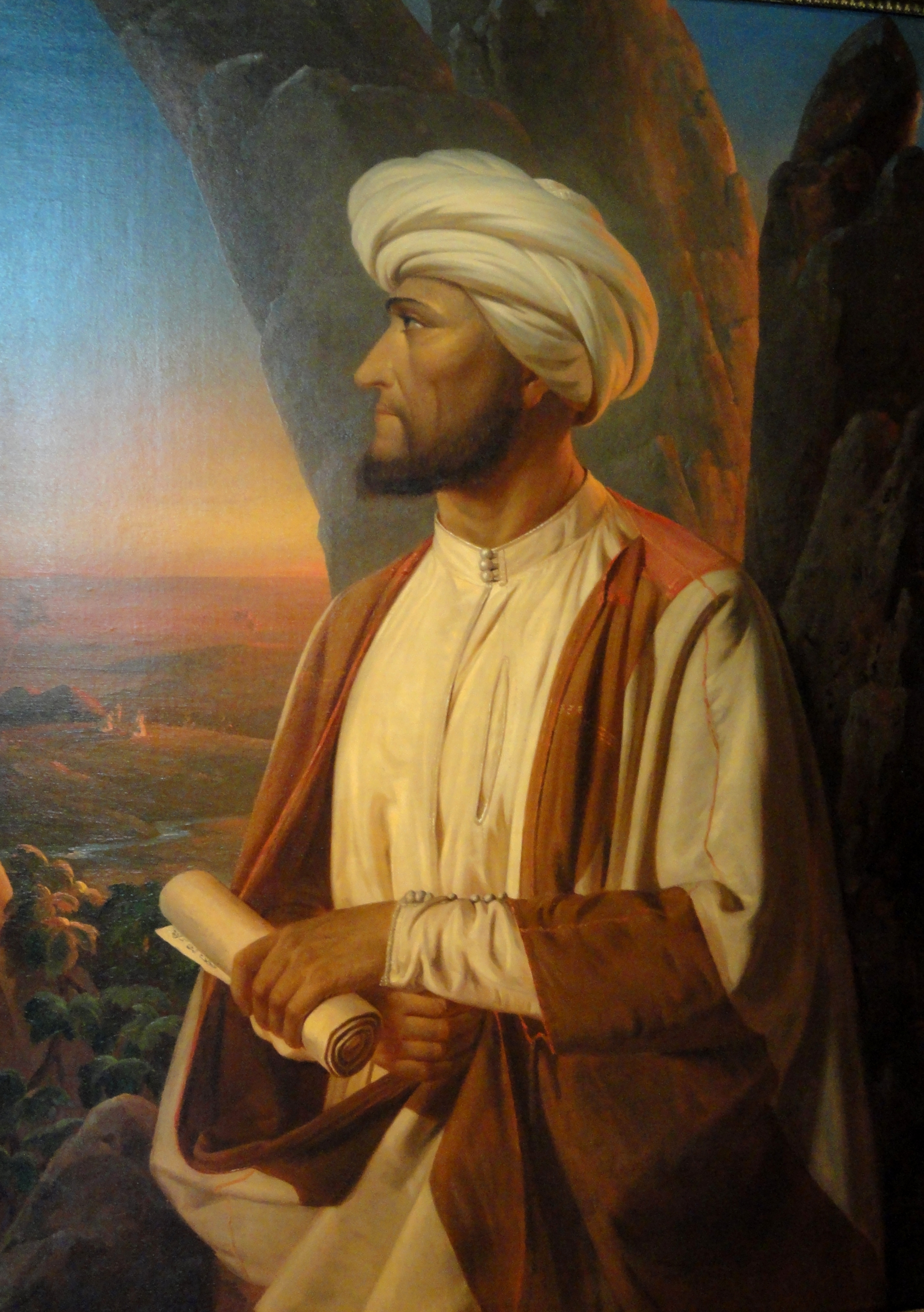
Portrait of Georg August Wallin, 1853

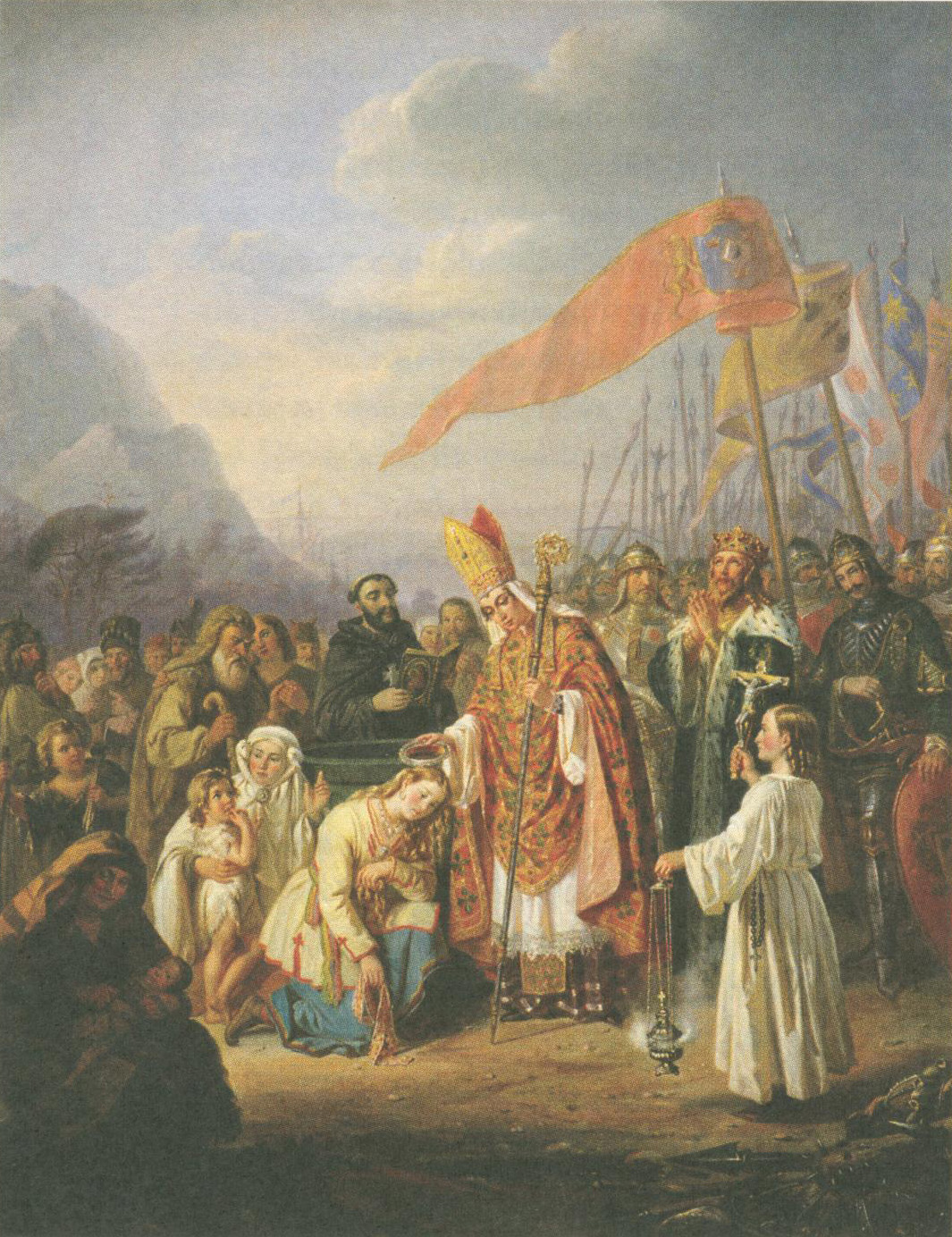
Bishop Henry Baptizing Finns, 1850–54

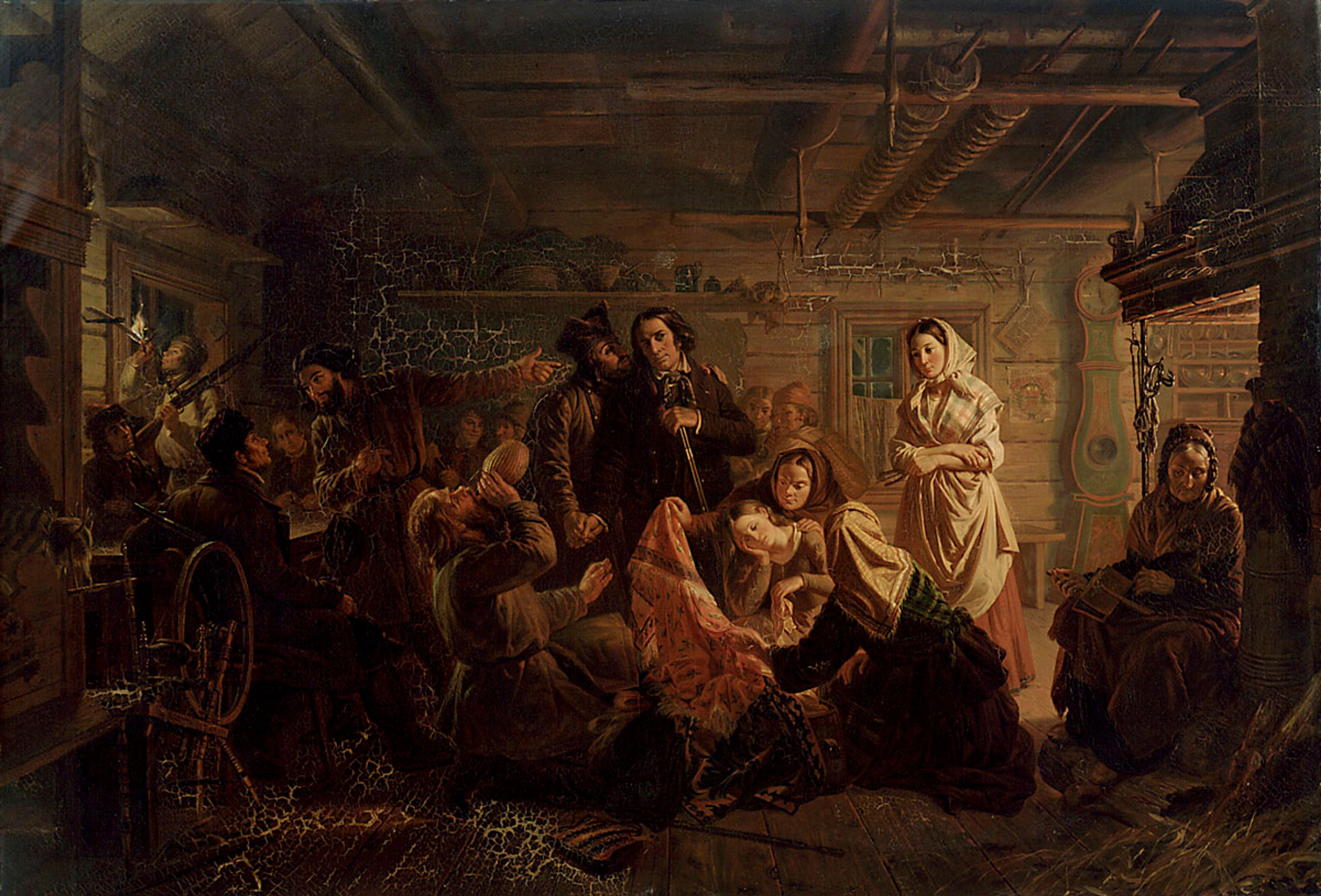
Scene from J. L. Runeberg´s "Moose Hunters", 1856

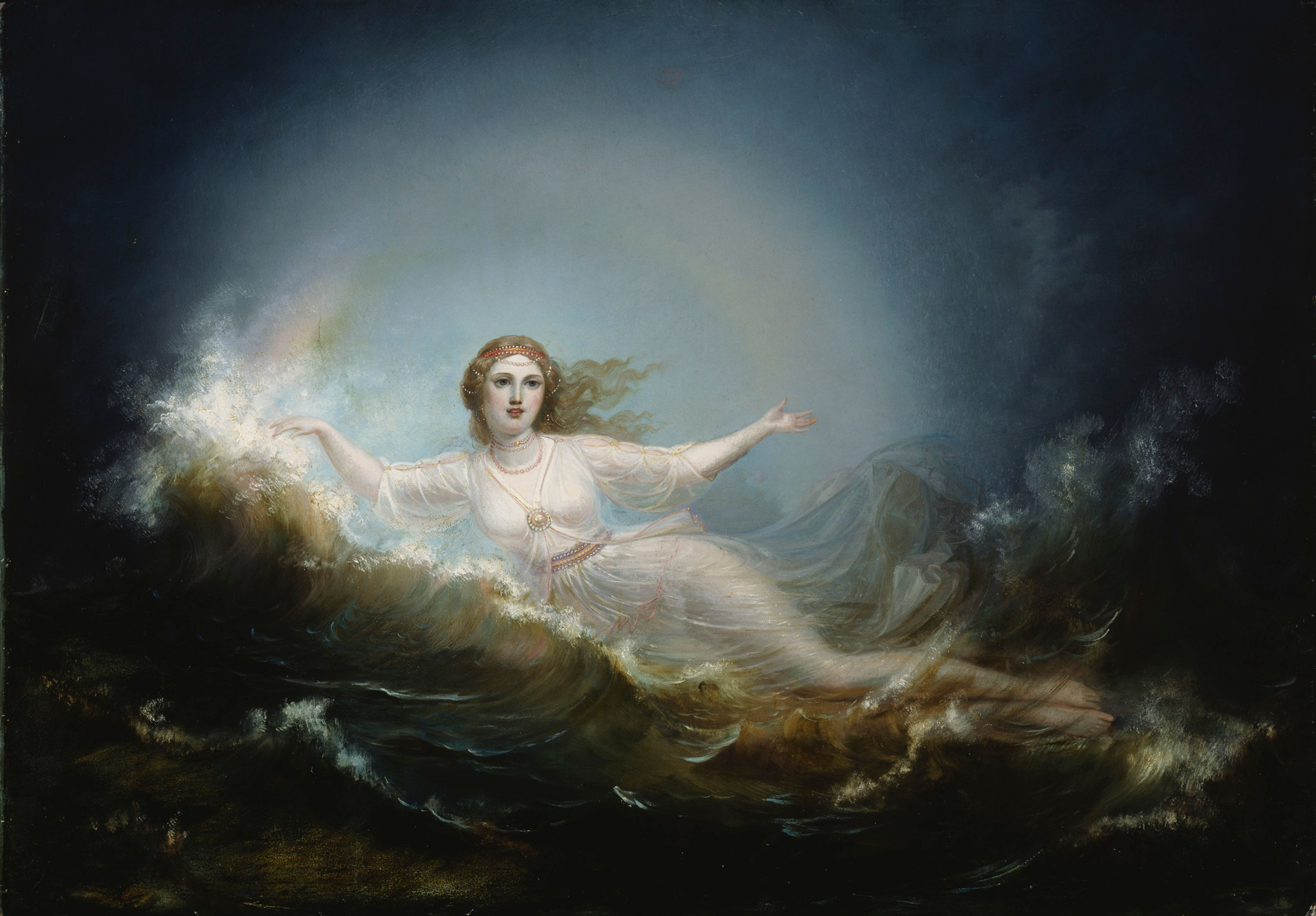
Ilmatar, 1860

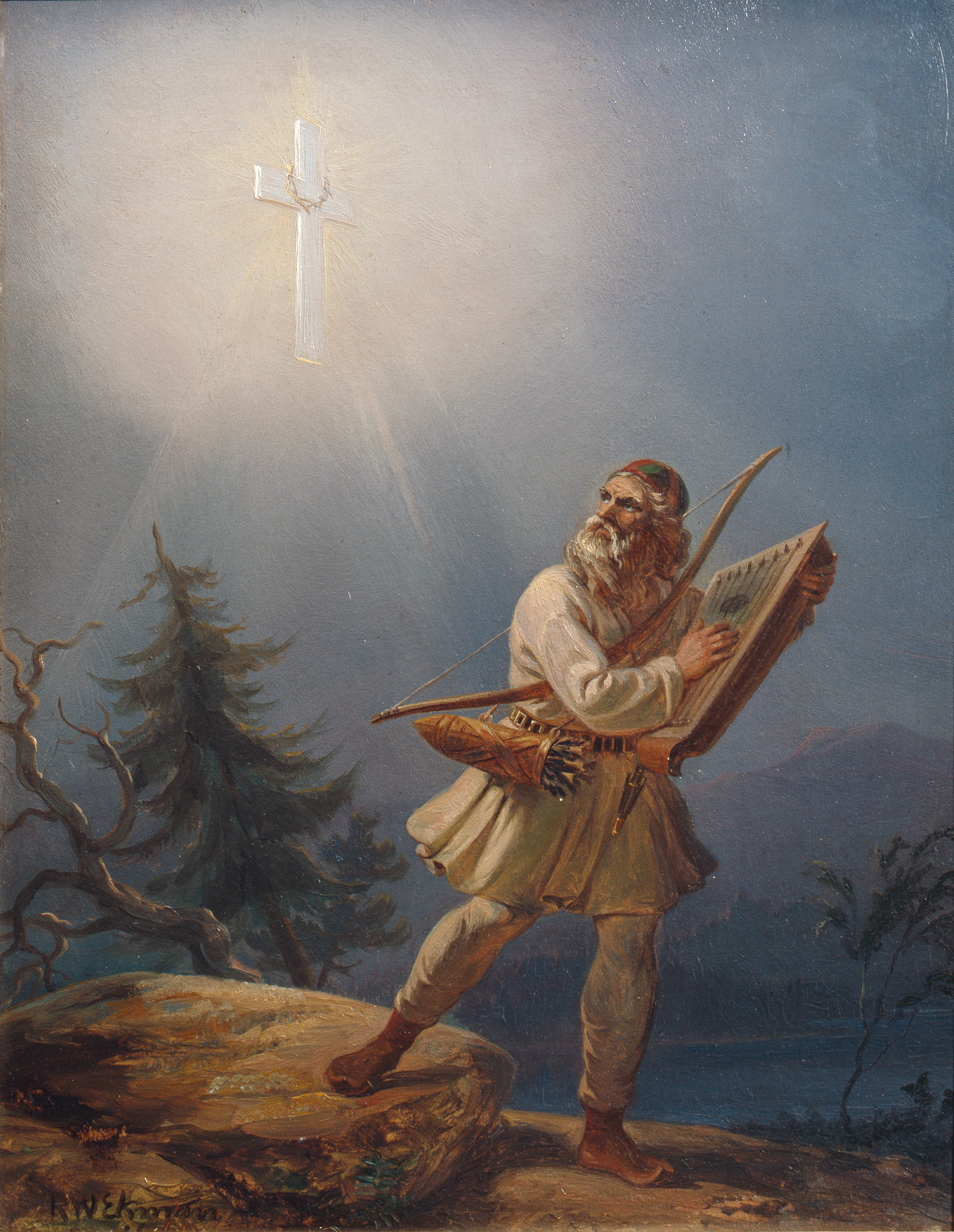
Fleeing Paganism; Väinämöinen Gives Way to the Power of the Cross, 1860

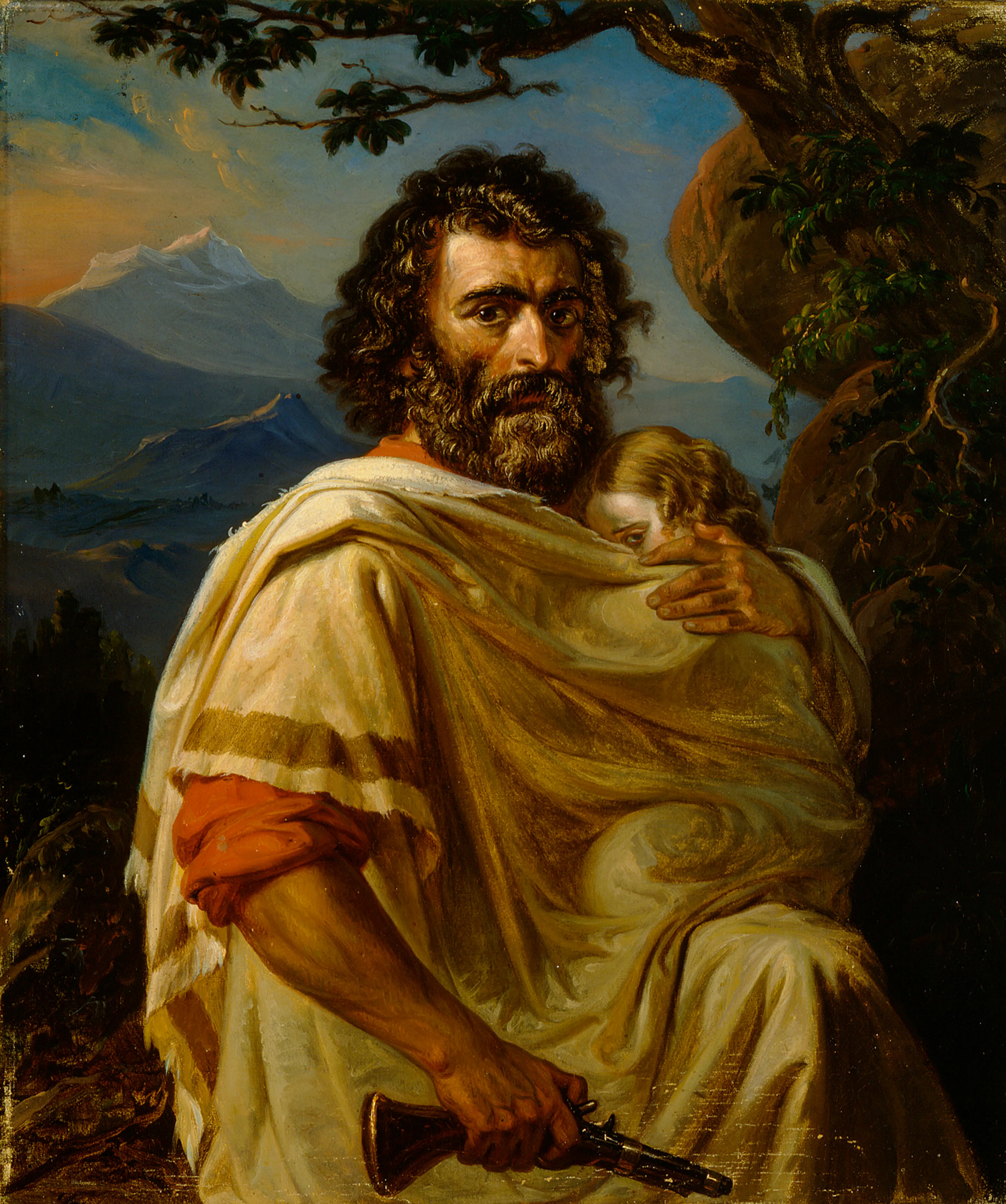
Italian Man with a Child, 1860

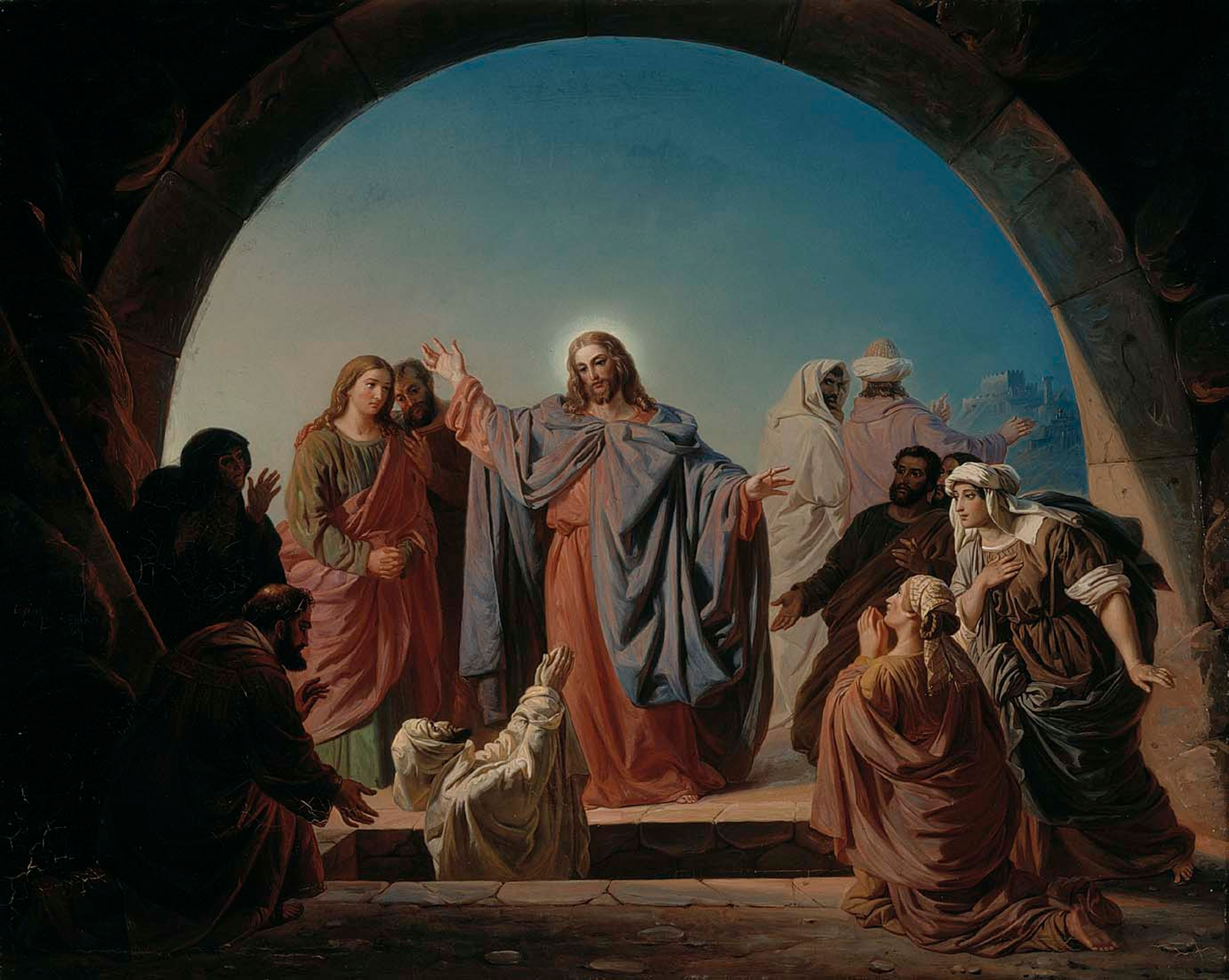
Jesus Wakes Lazarus, 1860

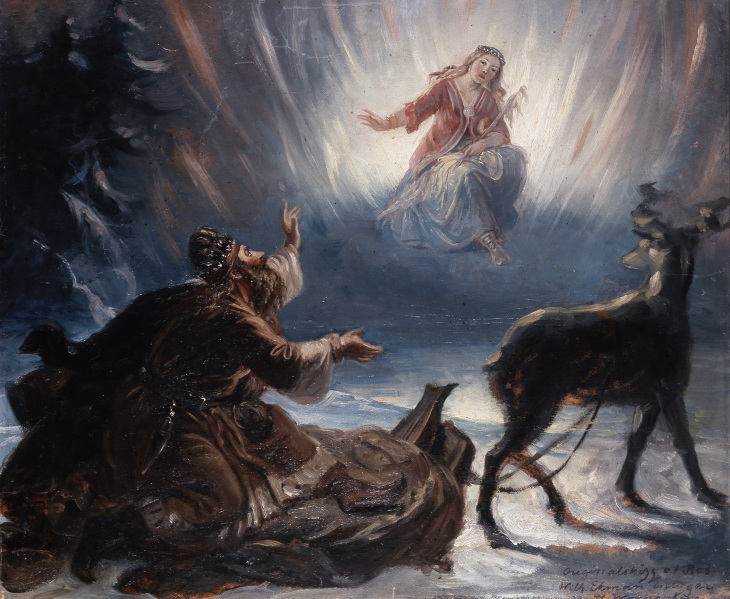
Väinämöinen and Maiden of Pohjola, 1861

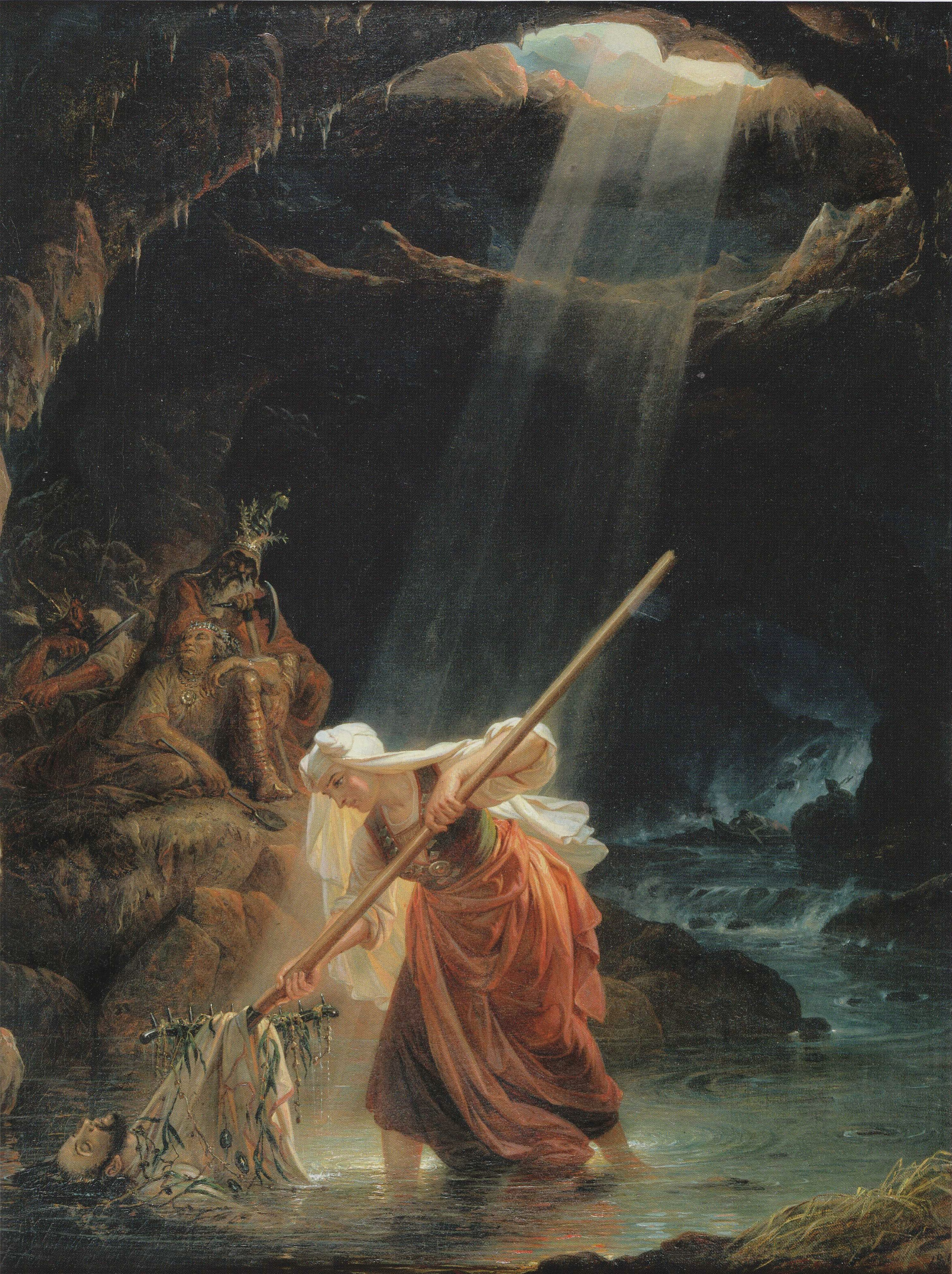
Lemminkäinen's Mother at Tuonela, 1862

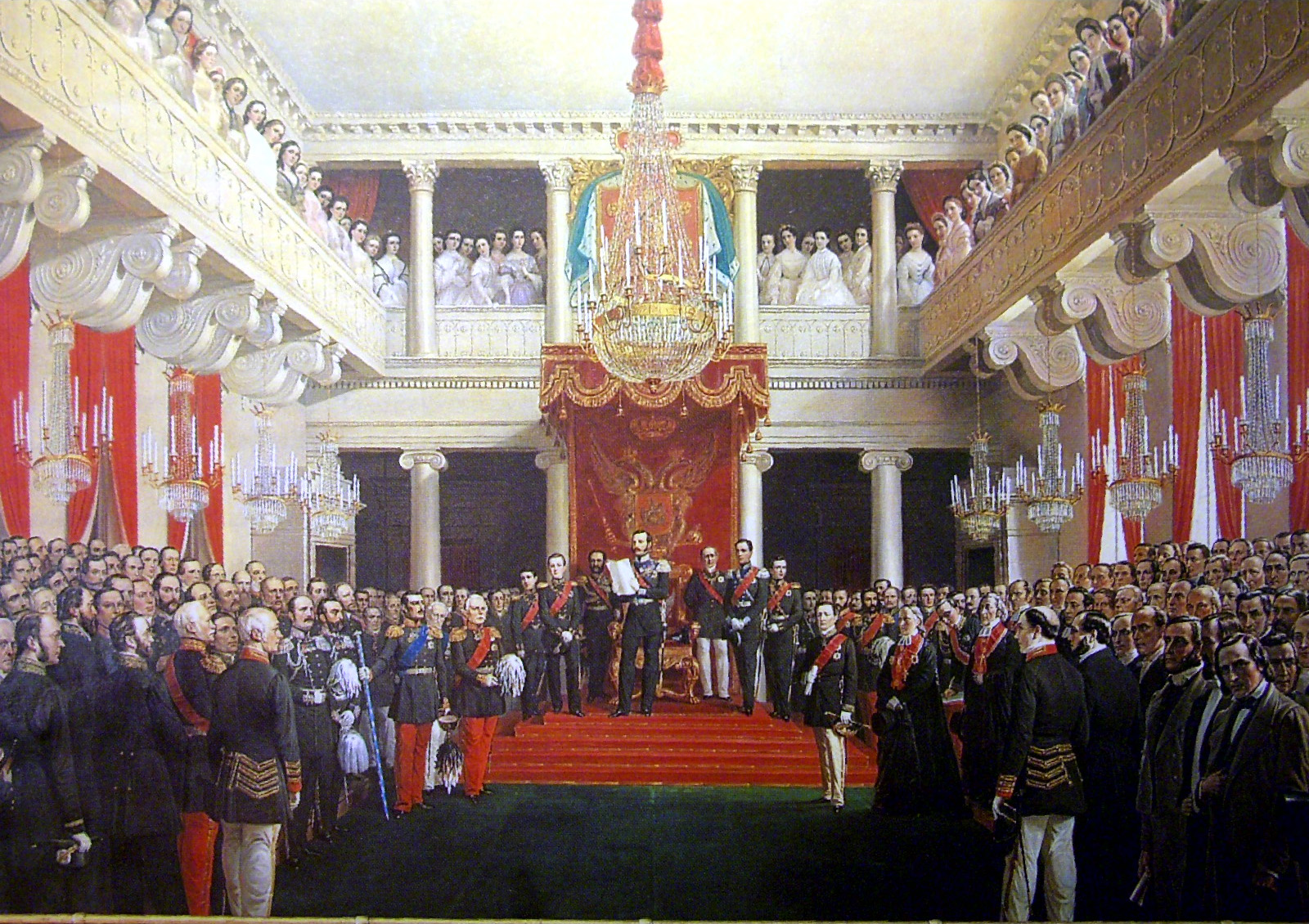
Emperor Alexander II Declares the 1863 Diet Session Open, 1865

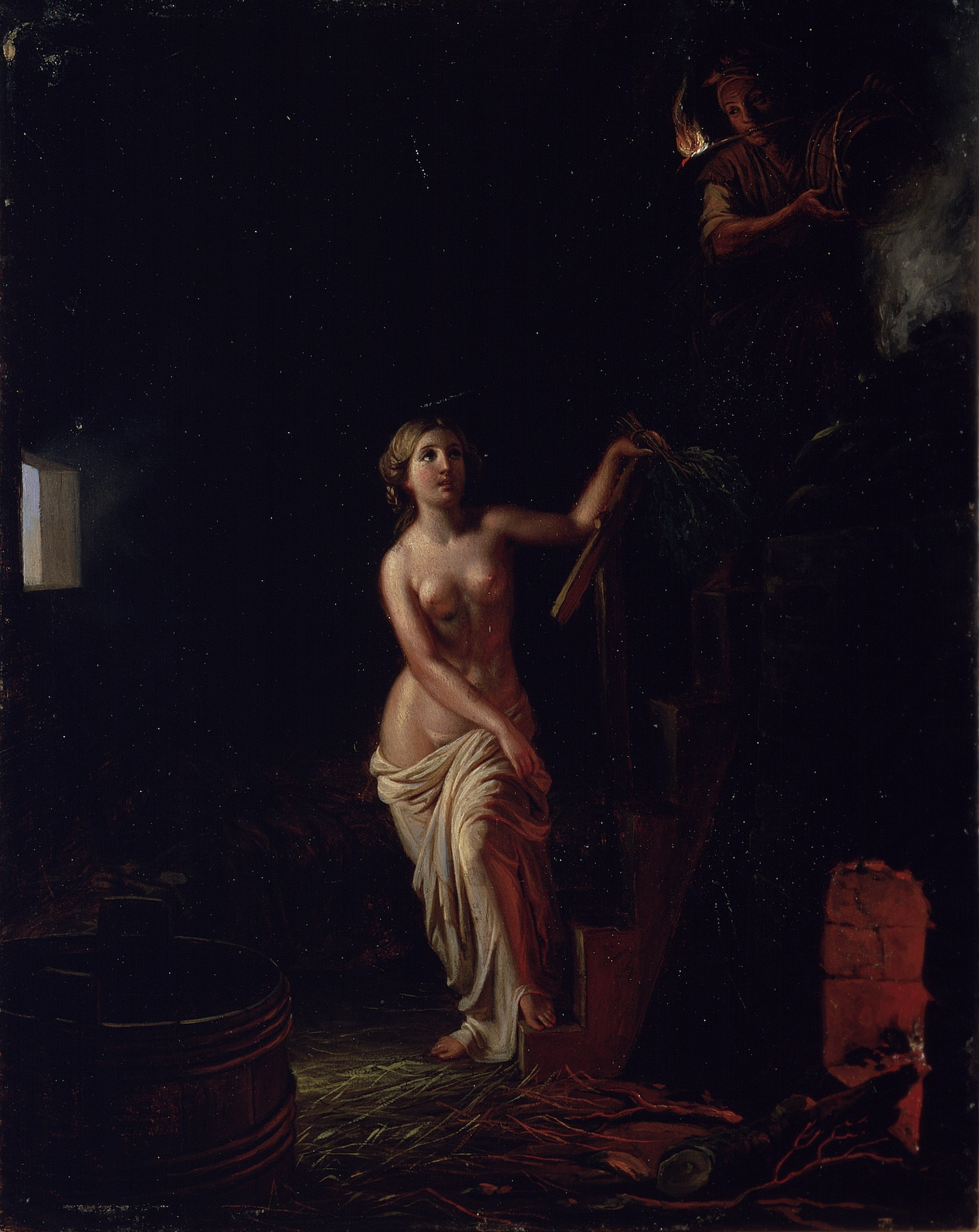
Bridal Sauna

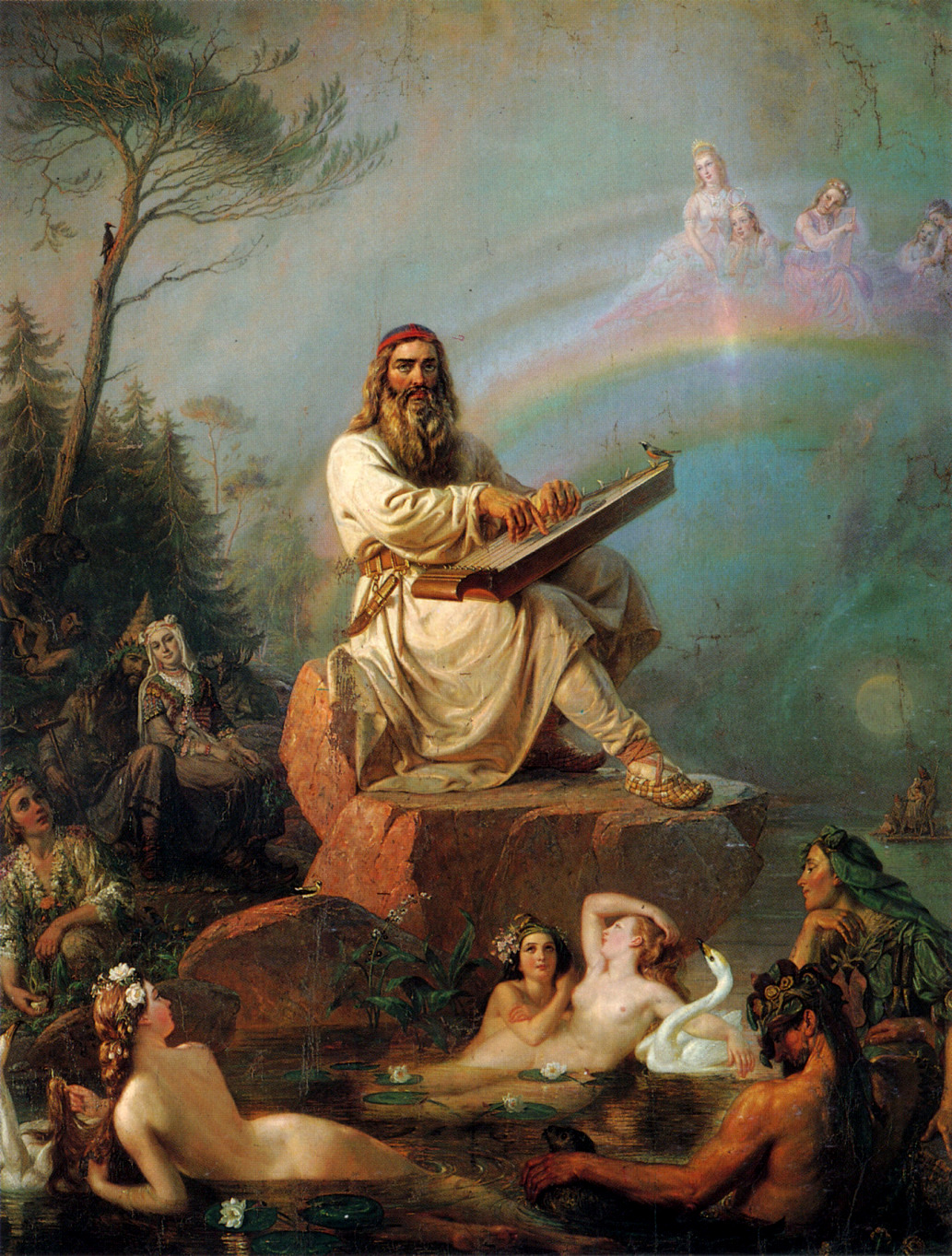
Väinämöinen's Play, 1866, a 4-meter tall painting displayed at Old Student House, Helsinki

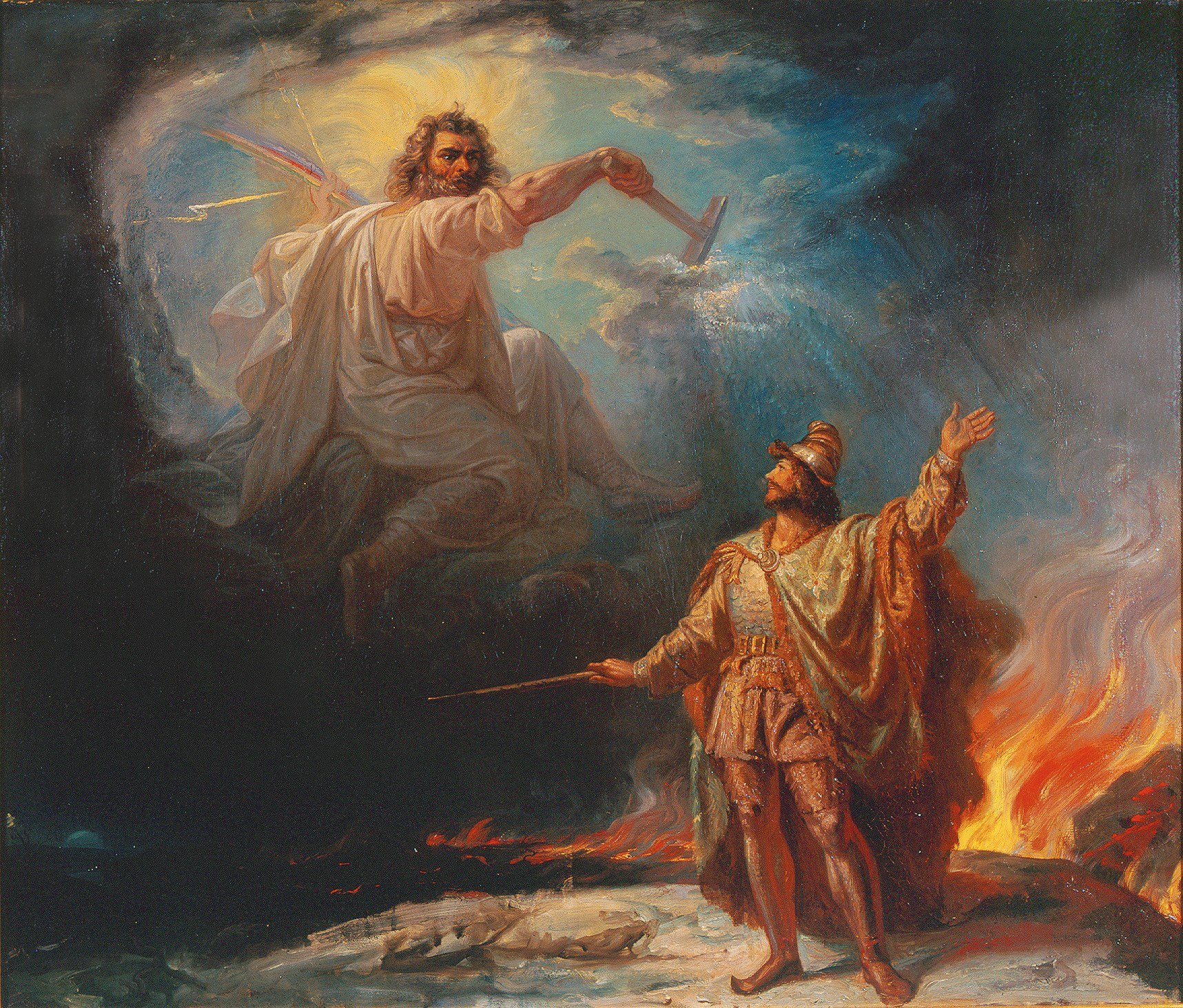
Lemminkäinen at the Fiery Lake, c. 1867, depicting a call for help from Ukko

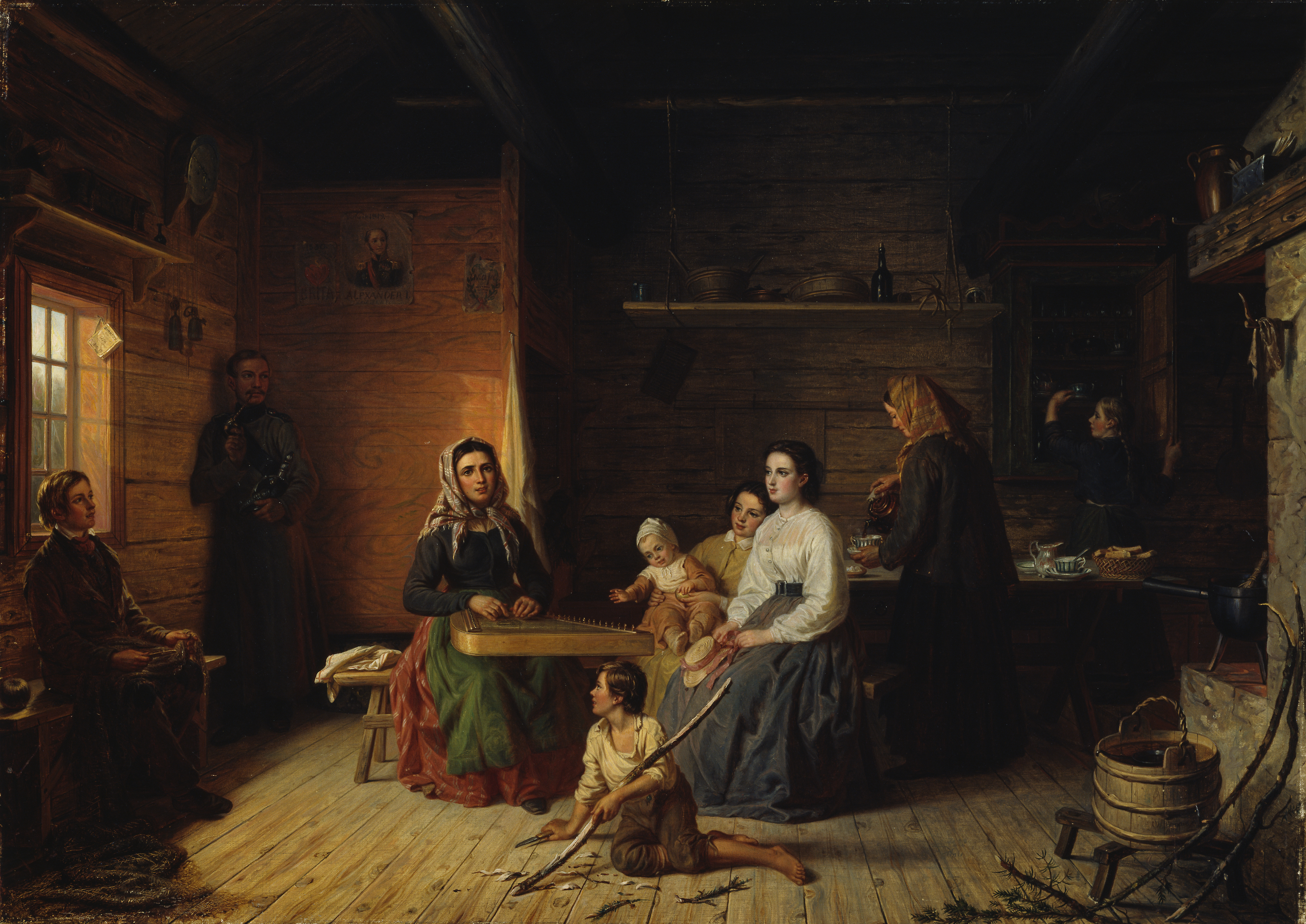
Kreeta Haapasalo Playing the Kantele in a Peasant Cottage, 1868

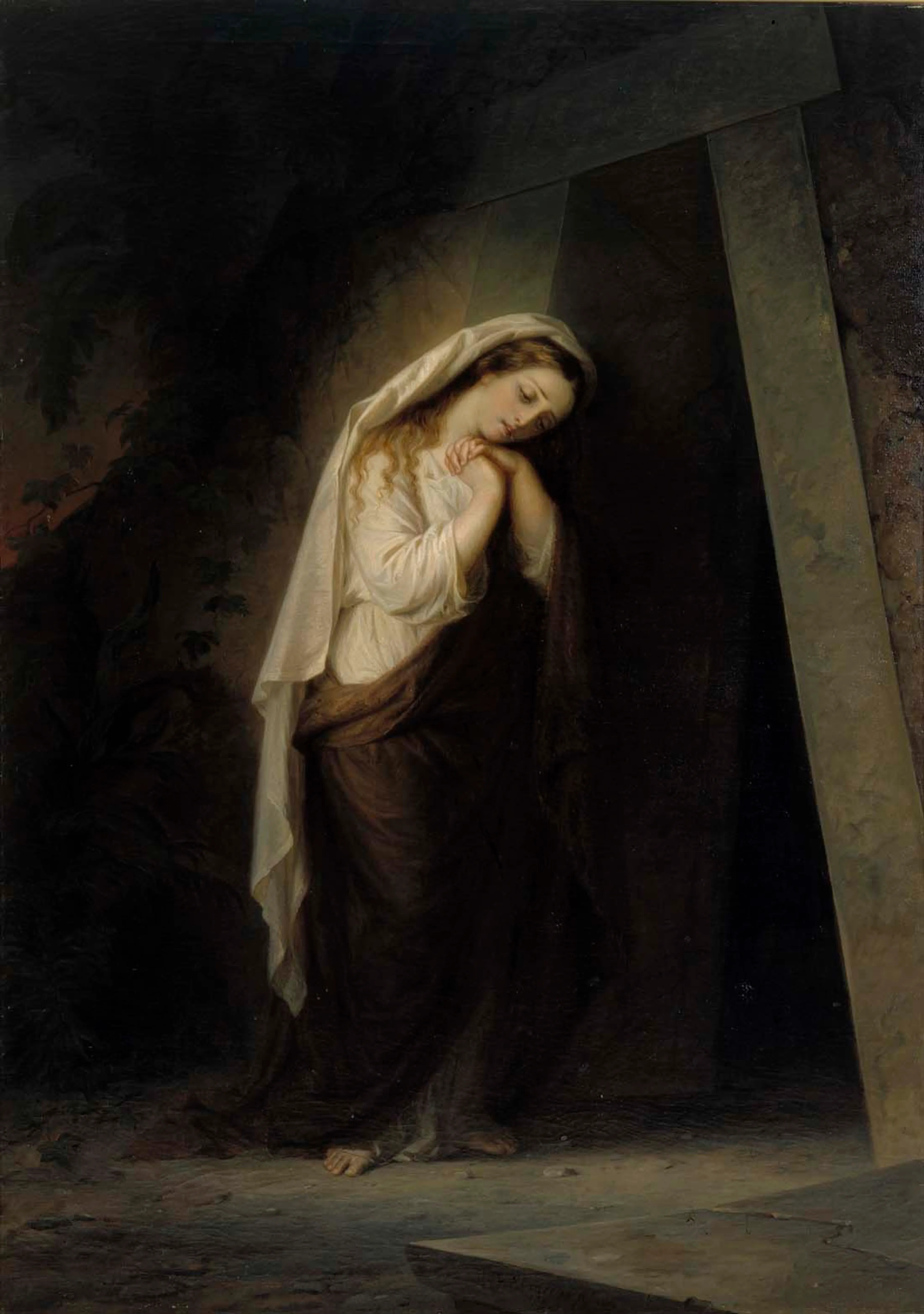
Mary Magdalene by the Grave of Christ, 1869

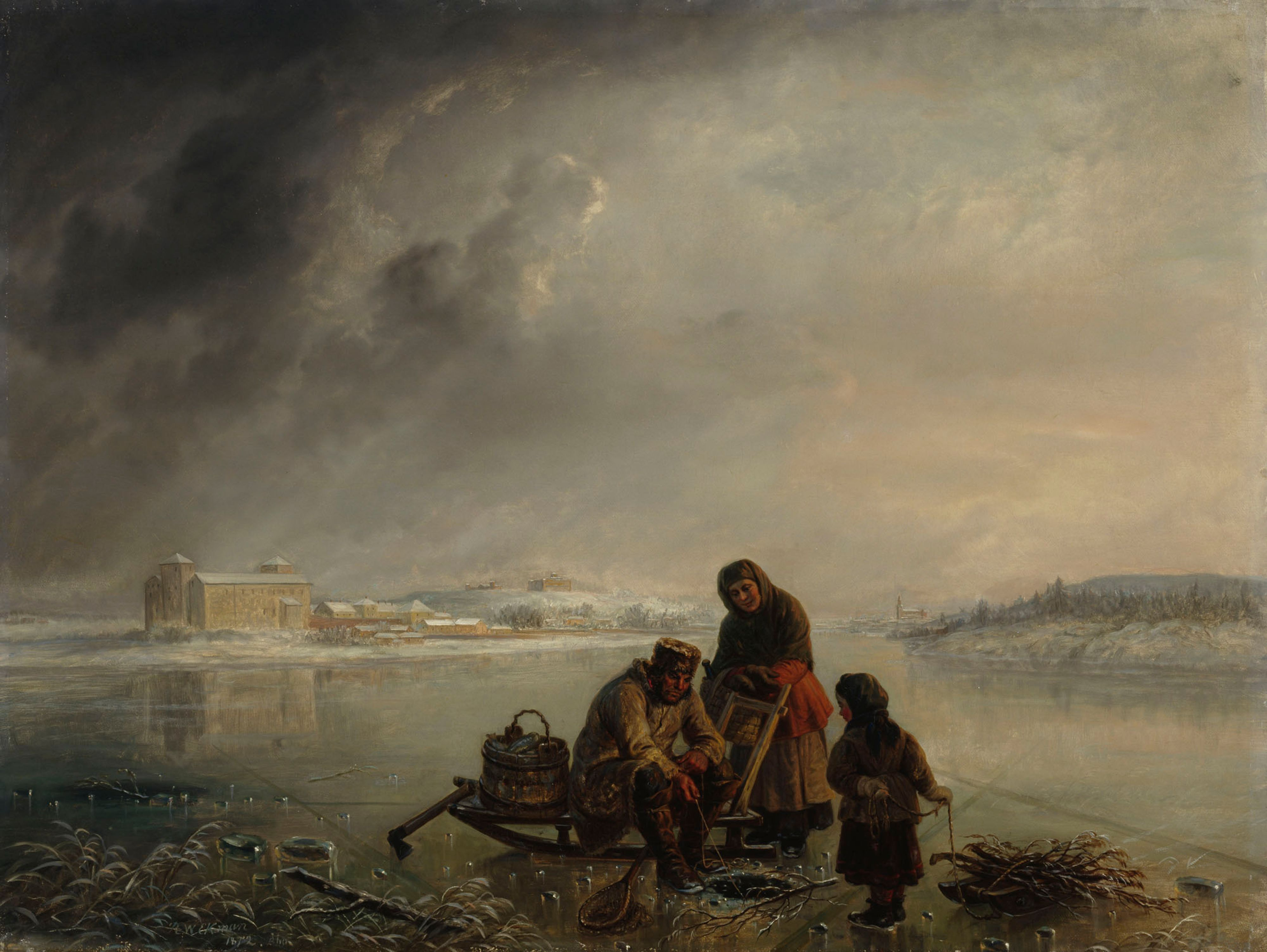
Winter Fishing in front of Turku, 1872

== See also ==
- Finnish art

== Other sources ==
- Hintze, Bertel (1926) Robert Wilhelm Ekman 1808–1873: En konsthistorisk studie (Helsingfors: Schildt)
