= Kreeta Haapasalo =

Finnish kantele-player, singer and folk musician

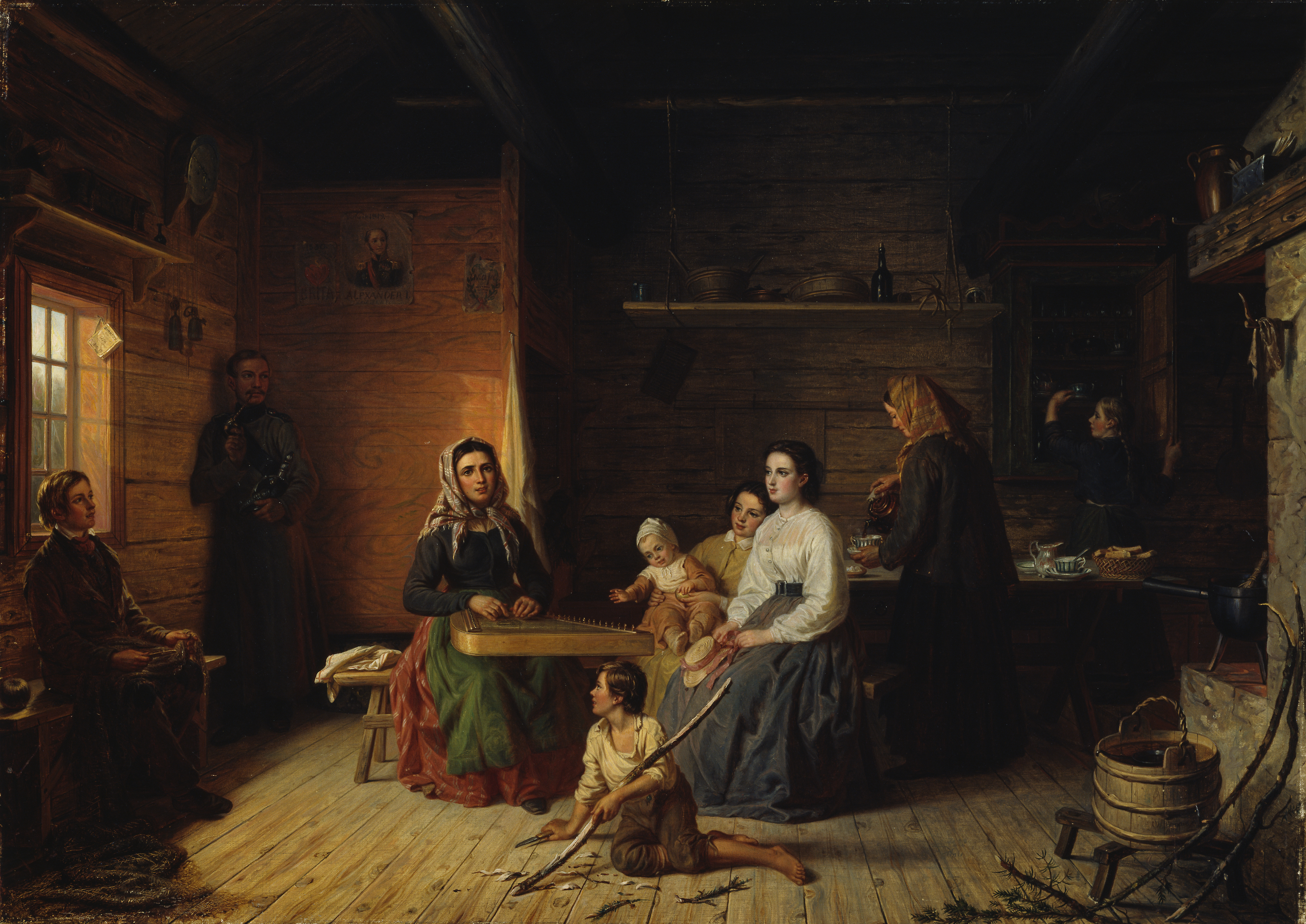
Robert Wilhelm Ekman - Kreeta Haapasalo Playing the Kantele in a Peasant Cottage

Kreeta Haapasalo, or Kantele-Kreeta (13 November 1813 – 29 March 1893), was a Finnish kantele-player, singer and folk musician. She is remembered as a folk music icon and the most notable of the 19th-century travelling kantele performers.

== Life ==
Kreeta Järvilä was born 13 November 1813, (Note: According to Aho (2016), Kreeta was born in 1815.) in Kaustinen parish in Järvilä village as the youngest of a family of five. Her parents were known as Jaakko Matinpoika Järvilä and Liisa Eliasentytär Karhu. Her maternal grandfather, Elias Mattsson Björn was a soldier with a talent for music.

Haapasalo's musical training began at six years of age with a 6-stringed kantele under the guidance of her uncle Vanhatalo Juho (Gammalgården), who played both violin and a "large, black kantele". As a child, she would sit and listen as he played his kantele. She also played the violin in the beginning but quit later. When she became older, her brother made her a bigger instrument of alder with wooden screws.

As a 13-year-old Haapasalo moved in with her sister and husband where she helped with the farm work; she stayed with them five years. During this time she travelled from house to house sewing, working on farms during the summer and sewing in the winter. As an 18-year-old she moved back to her parents and worked as a seamstress. Her musical interest was concentrated on practicing on the kantele. Nothing was mentioned about Haapasalo's singing, but she said in 1890: "When I was young I did not sing, but when sorrow and distress came as an adult, then I first burst out in song."

Kreeta Järvilä was married 24 June 1837 (in full attire with a large crown) to farmer's son Joonas Tanelinpoika Huntus, (Jonas Danielsson Wirkkala), born 13 April 1814 in Kaustinen, died 20 May 1890 at Varkaus. The couple had eleven children.

As newlyweds, the young couple stayed in Joonas' home, but after a short time they got a little croft near his parents. They had not settled themselves before they moved to Haapasalo's home. After some years they went to Kälviä as crofters. Restlessness led them to a crofter's holding at Haga at Vetil parsonage. They went to Luoma farm the following year, and in 1850 the family moved to Haapasalo, to the side of the village that borders on Halsua, the crown residence. From that time Haapasalo began to use the name Haapasalo at the initiative of Zacharias Topelius in 1853. The stay at Haapasalo was not of long duration, until they moved back to Haga croft, then to Kritilä croft at the parsonage.

== Career as a musician ==
Her husband's inability to work regularly was the biggest cause of the many moves. During the famine of 1867-68 Haapasalo was often forced to go on singing trips. "Lapseni minun kotia huonolle hoidolle jäi. kun pitkin mailman turuja mun täytyy kulkia näin." (My children left in a corner of the home with poor care while I have to sing and gather my bread from farm to farm.) comes from one of her songs.

She began her appearances in the nearest city of Kokkola in 1853, where one afternoon she received 10 rubles. At one house Captain Langenskjöld encouraged her to give a concert in Helsinki and gave her a letter of recommendation. She received 275 rubles on her journey through the southern cities; most of the money came in Helsinki. People showed genuine and pure kindness as Haapasalo was so new and overwhelming that from 1853 the media of that time could not be more attentive. People followed her journeys with sympathy and were pleased with her success. In the newspapers of the time one can gather many accounts of the singing and kantele playing at the appearances of the Ostrobothnian farmer's wife.

While in Helsinki, she gave her letters of recommendation to writer and poet Zachris Topelius. When he asked her surname, she replied that she had none. She was known as Kreeta Jacobsdotter, but he felt she should have a surname. The house she was living in at that time was known as Haapasalo, so Topelius advised her to call herself Kreeta Haapasalo. Kantele Haapasalo's songs, which she always sang, accompanied her for 40 years in the homes, in schools, at large and small festivals, at concerts, at agricultural shows, at restaurants and at markets.

In 1869, they bought a home at Kalliokoski in Halsua where they stayed four years.

Johan L. Runeberg arranged a party for her appearance in Porvoo. One time she performed at the royal theater in Stockholm. This was arranged by Swedish poet Emil Van Qvanten. She also performed several times in the auditorium of the nobility in Saint Petersburg (Russia).

The family's daughter Fia often followed her mother on trips because she also was a gifted singer and played the kantele. She married at Leppävirta and Haapasalo and Joonas with the children Matti and Matilda moved to a rented house in Varkaus. After her husband's death 20 May 1890, Haapasalo moved for the last time. Daughter Fia's family moved to Jyväskylä and Haapasalo followed.

Haapasalo's extensive repertory was mostly spiritual songs, folk dances, ballads as well as her own songs, which often emphasized sorrow. One time when she returned from a trip she heard that two of her children were to be buried that day. She arrived at the cemetery to hear that an epidemic had taken two of her children.

== Death and legacy ==
She died 29 Mar 1893 and was buried in Jyväskylä. In 1899, the Society of Young Finns placed a granite stone on her grave.

Aleksis Kivi mentioned her in his poem Anjanpellon markkivat: "Vaimo vakaa Pohjanmaalta soitti kanteleella lempiäll." (The serious woman from Ostrobothnia played her beautiful kantele.)

In 1954, a statue was erected in her memory in Kaustinen with Ilmari Wirkkala as a prime sponsor. Another monument was erected at her homeplace in Veteli. In the early 1990s Finland honored her and five other women on postage stamps.

Court artist R. W. Ekman has immortalized her on three canvases. The most well-known picture of her is one by Arvid Liljelund in Tuusula - a painted portrait where Haapasalo stands at a window singing and playing as one of her small grandsons sits and listens.

== Sources ==
- Anneli Asplund: Haapasalo, Kreta (1813–1893) Kansallisbiografia-e . 14.3.2000. Helsingfors: Finska Litteratursällskapet.
