= List of awards and nominations received by Bill Murray =

Bill Murray awards and nominations
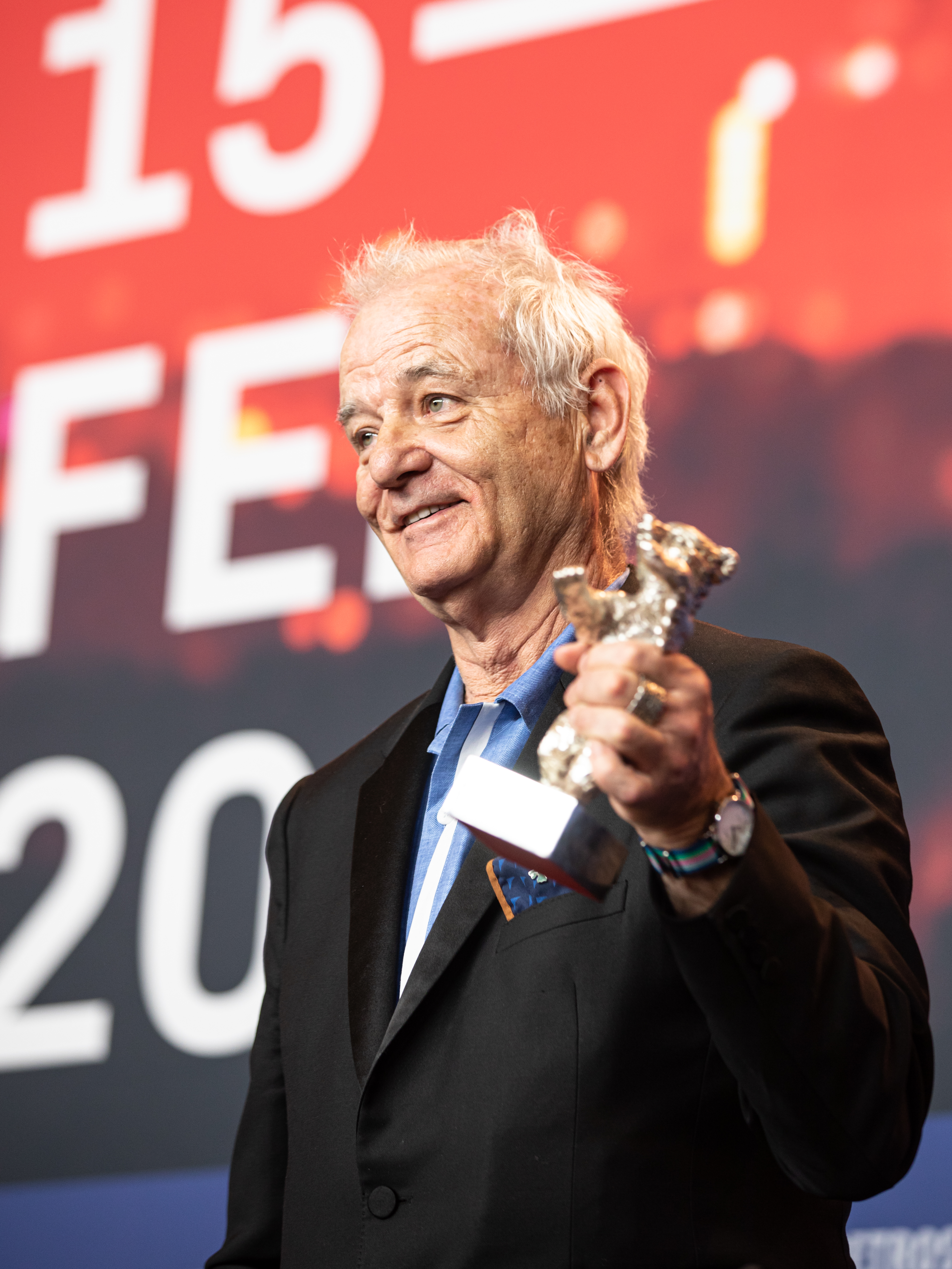
- Murray at Berlinale in 2018
Awards and nominations
Award	Wins	Nominations
Academy Award	0	1
Actor Awards	0	3
BAFTA Awards	1	1
Critics' Choice Awards	1	5
Emmy Award	2	4
Golden Globes	1	7

Totals (Note: Certain award groups do not simply award one winner. They acknowledge several different recipients, have runners-up, and have third place. Since this is a specific recognition and is different from losing an award, runner-up mentions are considered wins in this award tally. For simplification and to avoid errors, each award in this list has been presumed to have had a prior nomination.)
- Wins: 26
- Nominations: 140

Bill Murray is an American actor and comedian. Murray has received a BAFTA Award, a Critics' Choice Television Award, a Golden Globe Award, two Primetime Emmy Awards, and two Independent Spirit Awards as well as nominations for a Academy Award and three Actor Awards. In 2016, he received the Mark Twain Prize for American Humor at the John F. Kennedy Center for the Performing Arts.

Murray started his career as a cast member and writer on the NBC sketch comedy series Saturday Night Live for which he earned the Primetime Emmy Award for Outstanding Writing for a Variety Series in 1977. He transitioned to film where he gained stardom in comedy films and became known for his collaborations with filmmakers such as Harold Ramis, Sofia Coppola, Wes Anderson, and Jim Jarmusch. He starred in the science-fiction comedy Ghostbusters (1984) for which he was nominated for the Golden Globe Award for Best Actor in a Motion Picture – Musical or Comedy. He made his first collaboration with director Wes Anderson in the coming-of-age film Rushmore (1998) for which he received the Independent Spirit Award for Best Supporting Male as well as a nomination for the Golden Globe Award for Best Supporting Actor – Motion Picture.

He starred in his first collaboration with Sofia Coppola playing an aging actor in the romantic dramedy Lost in Translation (2003) for which he received the BAFTA Award for Best Actor in a Leading Role and the Golden Globe Award for Best Actor in a Motion Picture – Musical or Comedy, in addition to nominations for the Academy Award, the Actor Award, and the Critics' Choice Movie Award, all for Best Actor. He received further Golden Globe-nominations for his performances as Franklin D. Roosevelt in the historical film Hyde Park on Hudson (2012), a retired war veteran in the comedy St. Vincent (2014), and a caring father in On the Rocks (2020).

On television, he starred in the HBO limited series Olive Kitteridge (2014) for which he won the Primetime Emmy Award for Outstanding Supporting Actor in a Limited or Anthology Series or Movie, the Critics' Choice Television Award for Best Supporting Actor in a Movie/Miniseries, and the Golden Globe Award for Best Supporting Actor – Series, Miniseries or Television Film. He starred in the Netflix special A Very Murray Christmas (2015) for which he was nominated as a producer for the Primetime Emmy Award for Outstanding Television Movie.

== Major Awards ==
=== Academy Awards ===
Year	Category	Nominated work	Result	Ref.
2004	Best Actor	Lost in Translation	Nominated	

=== Actor Awards ===
Year	Category	Nominated work	Result	Ref.
2004	Outstanding Performance by a Male Actor in a Leading Role	Lost in Translation	Nominated	
2015	Outstanding Performance by a Cast in a Motion Picture	The Grand Budapest Hotel	Nominated	
2016	Outstanding Performance by a Male Actor in a Miniseries or Television Movie	A Very Murray Christmas	Nominated	

=== BAFTA Awards ===
Year	Category	Nominated work	Result	Ref.
British Academy Film Awards
2004	Best Actor in a Leading Role	Lost in Translation	Won	

=== Critics' Choice Awards ===
Year	Category	Nominated work	Result	Ref.
Critics' Choice Movie Awards
2004	Best Actor	Lost in Translation	Nominated	
2005	Best Cast	The Life Aquatic with Steve Zissou	Nominated	
2015	Best Actor in a Comedy	St. Vincent	Nominated	
2021	Best Supporting Actor	On the Rocks	Nominated	
Critics' Choice Television Awards
2015	Best Supporting Actor in a Movie/Miniseries	Olive Kitteridge	Won	

=== Emmy Award ===
Year	Category	Nominated work	Result	Ref.
Primetime Emmy Awards
1977	Outstanding Writing for a Variety Series	Saturday Night Live	Won	
1979	Outstanding Variety Series	Saturday Night Live	Nominated	
2015	Outstanding Supporting Actor in a Limited Series or Movie	Olive Kitteridge	Won	
2016	Outstanding Television Movie (as a producer)	A Very Murray Christmas	Nominated	

=== Golden Globe Awards ===
Year	Category	Nominated work	Result	Ref.
1985	Best Actor – Motion Picture Musical or Comedy	Ghostbusters	Nominated	
1999	Best Supporting Actor – Motion Picture	Rushmore	Nominated	
2004	Best Actor – Motion Picture Musical or Comedy	Lost in Translation	Won	
2013	Best Actor – Motion Picture Musical or Comedy	Hyde Park on Hudson	Nominated	
2015	Best Actor – Motion Picture Musical or Comedy	St. Vincent	Nominated	
2015	Best Supporting Actor – Television	Olive Kitteridge	Nominated	
2021	Best Supporting Actor – Motion Picture	On the Rocks	Nominated	

== Critics Awards ==
Organizations	Year	Category	Work	Result	Ref.
Alliance of Women Film Journalists EDA Awards	2020	Best Supporting Actor	On the Rocks	Nominated	
Boston Society of Film Critics Awards	2003	Best Actor	Lost in Translation	Won	
Boston Society of Film Critics Awards	2012	Best Cast	The Life Aquatic with Steve Zissou	Nominated	
Boston Society of Film Critics Awards	2012	Best Cast	Moonrise Kingdom	2nd place	
Chicago Film Critics Association Awards	1998	Best Supporting Actor	Rushmore	Nominated	
Chicago Film Critics Association Awards	2003	Best Actor	Lost in Translation	Won	
Chicago Film Critics Association Awards	2020	Best Supporting Actor	On the Rocks	Nominated	
Columbus Film Critics Association	2003	Best Actor	Lost in Translation	Nominated	
Columbus Film Critics Association	2012	Best Ensemble	Moonrise Kingdom	Won	
Columbus Film Critics Association	2014	Best Ensemble	The Grand Budapest Hotel	Won	
Columbus Film Critics Association	2020	Best Supporting Actor	On the Rocks	Nominated	
Dallas-Fort Worth Film Critics Association	2003	Best Actor	Lost in Translation	Nominated	
Dallas-Fort Worth Film Critics Association	2010	Best Supporting Actor	Get Low	Nominated	
Dallas-Fort Worth Film Critics Association	2020	Best Supporting Actor	On the Rocks	4th place	
Denver Film Critics Society	2020	Best Supporting Actor	On the Rocks	Nominated	
Detroit Film Critics Society Awards	2009	Best Ensemble	Zombieland	Nominated	
Detroit Film Critics Society Awards	2012	Best Actor	Hyde Park on Hudson	Nominated	
Detroit Film Critics Society Awards	2014	Best Ensemble	The Grand Budapest Hotel	Won	
Florida Film Critics Circle Awards	2014	Best Ensemble	The Grand Budapest Hotel	Won	
Florida Film Critics Circle Awards	2020	Best Supporting Actor	On the Rocks	Nominated	
Greater Western New York Film Critics Association	2020	Best Supporting Actor	On the Rocks	Nominated	
Houston Film Critics Society Awards	2010	Best Supporting Actor	Get Low	Nominated	
Houston Film Critics Society Awards	2020	Best Supporting Actor	On the Rocks	Nominated	
Iowa Film Critics Association	2003	Best Actor	Lost in Translation	Won	
Iowa Film Critics Association	2020	Best Supporting Actor	On the Rocks	Runner-up	
Irish Film and Television Awards	2003	Best International Actor	Lost in Translation	Nominated	
Los Angeles Film Critics Association Awards	1998	Best Supporting Actor	Wild Things	Won	
Los Angeles Film Critics Association Awards	1998	Best Supporting Actor	Rushmore	Won	
Los Angeles Film Critics Association Awards	2003	Best Actor	Lost in Translation	Won	
London Film Critics Circle Awards	2003	Actor of the Year	Lost in Translation	Nominated	
Music City Film Critics Association	2020	Best Supporting Actor	On the Rocks	Nominated	
National Society of Film Critics Awards	1998	Best Supporting Actor	Rushmore	Won	
National Society of Film Critics Awards	2003	Best Actor	Lost in Translation	Won	
New York Film Critics Circle Awards	1998	Best Supporting Actor	Rushmore	Won	
New York Film Critics Circle Awards	2003	Best Actor	Lost in Translation	Won	
New York Film Critics Online Awards	2003	Best Actor	Lost in Translation	Won	
North Carolina Film Critics Association	2020	Best Supporting Actor	On the Rocks	Nominated	
North Texas Film Critics Association	2020	Best Supporting Actor	On the Rocks	Nominated	
Online Film and Television Association Film	1998	Best Supporting Actor	Rushmore	Nominated	
Online Film and Television Association Film	1998	Best Comedy/Musical Actor	Rushmore	Won	
Online Film and Television Association Film	2003	Best Actor	Lost in Translation	Won	
Online Film and Television Association Film	2003	Best Music, Adapted Song	Lost in Translation for the song "More Than This"	Nominated	
Online Film and Television Association Television	2014	Best Supporting Actor in a Motion Picture or Miniseries	Oliver Kitteridge	Won	
Online Film Critics Society Awards	2003	Best Actor	Lost in Translation	Won	
Online Film Critics Society Awards	2020	Best Supporting Actor	On the Rocks	Nominated	
Phoenix Film Critics Society	2001	Best Cast	The Royal Tenenbaums	Nominated	
Phoenix Film Critics Society	2003	Best Actor	Lost in Translation	Nominated	
Phoenix Film Critics Society	2012	Best Cast	Moonrise Kingdom	Won	
Phoenix Film Critics Society	2014	Best Cast	The Grand Budapest Hotel	Nominated	
San Diego Film Critics Society Awards	2014	Best Ensemble	The Grand Budapest Hotel	Nominated	
San Diego Film Critics Society Awards	2020	Best Supporting Actor	On the Rocks	Nominated	
San Diego Film Critics Society Awards	2020	Best Comedic Performance	On the Rocks	Nominated	
San Francisco Film Critics Circle Awards	2003	Best Actor	Lost in Translation	Won	
Seattle Film Critics Awards	2003	Best Actor	Lost in Translation	Won	
Seattle Film Critics Society Awards	2020	Best Supporting Actor	On the Rocks	Nominated	
Southeastern Film Critics Association	2003	Best Actor	Lost in Translation	Won	
Southeastern Film Critics Association	2012	Best Ensemble	Moonrise Kingdom	2nd place	
St. Louis Film Critics Association	2020	Best Supporting Actor	On the Rocks	Nominated	
Vancouver Film Critics Circle Awards	2003	Best Actor	Lost in Translation	Nominated	
Washington D.C. Area Film Critics Association	2003	Best Actor	Lost in Translation	Won	
Washington D.C. Area Film Critics Association	2014	Best Ensemble	The Grand Budapest Hotel	Nominated	
Washington D.C. Area Film Critics Association	2020	Best Supporting Actor	On the Rocks	Nominated	

== Miscellaneous Awards ==
Organizations	Year	Category	Work	Result	Ref.
American Comedy Awards	1998	Funniest Supporting Actor in a Motion Picture	Rushmore	Won	
Blockbuster Entertainment Awards	2000	Favorite Supporting Actor – Action	Charlie's Angels	Won	
Genie Awards	1979	Best Performance by a Foreign Actor	Meatballs	Nominated	
Gotham Independent Film Awards	2012	Best Ensemble Performance	Moonrise Kingdom	Nominated	
Independent Spirit Awards	1999	Best Supporting Male	Rushmore	Won	
Independent Spirit Awards	2004	Best Male Lead	Lost in Translation	Won	
Independent Spirit Awards	2011	Best Supporting Male	Get Low	Nominated	
International Cinephile Society Awards	2003	Best Actor	Lost in Translation	Won	
MTV Movie Awards	1991	Best Comedic Performance	What About Bob?	Nominated	
MTV Movie Awards	1993	Best Comedic Performance	Groundhog Day	Nominated	
MTV Movie Awards	2003	Best Performance - Male	Lost in Translation	Nominated	
MTV Movie Awards	2009	Best WTF Moment	Zombieland	Nominated	
Nickelodeon Kids' Choice Awards	2017	Most Wanted Pet	The Jungle Book	Nominated	
People's Choice Awards	2016	Favorite Animated Movie Voice	The Jungle Book	Nominated	
Razzie Awards	2024	Worst Supporting Actor	Ant-Man and the Wasp: Quantumania	Nominated	
Santa Barbara International Film Festival	2021	On the Rocks	Maltin Modern Master Award	Won	
Satellite Awards	1998	Best Supporting Actor – Motion Picture	Rushmore	Won	
Satellite Awards	1999	Best Supporting Actor – Motion Picture	Cradle Will Rock	Nominated	
Satellite Awards	2003	Best Actor – Motion Picture Musical or Comedy	Lost in Translation	Won	
Satellite Awards	2004	Best Actor – Motion Picture Musical or Comedy	Life Aquatic with Steve Zissou	Nominated	
Satellite Awards	2005	Best Actor – Motion Picture Musical or Comedy	Broken Flowers	Nominated	
Satellite Awards	2010	Best Supporting Actor – Motion Picture	Get Low	Nominated	
Satellite Awards	2020	Best Supporting Actor – Motion Picture	On the Rocks	Nominated	
Saturn Awards	1988	Best Actor	Scrooged	Nominated	
Saturn Awards	1993	Best Actor	Groundhog Day	Nominated	
Scream Awards	2009	Best Ensemble	Zombieland	Won	
Scream Awards	2009	Best Cameo	Zombieland	Won	

== Honorary awards ==
Organizations	Year	Accolade	Result	Ref.
John F. Kennedy Center for the Performing Arts	2016	Mark Twain Prize for American Humor	Honored	
