= Björn Wahlroos =

Finnish banker, investor and chairman (born 1952)

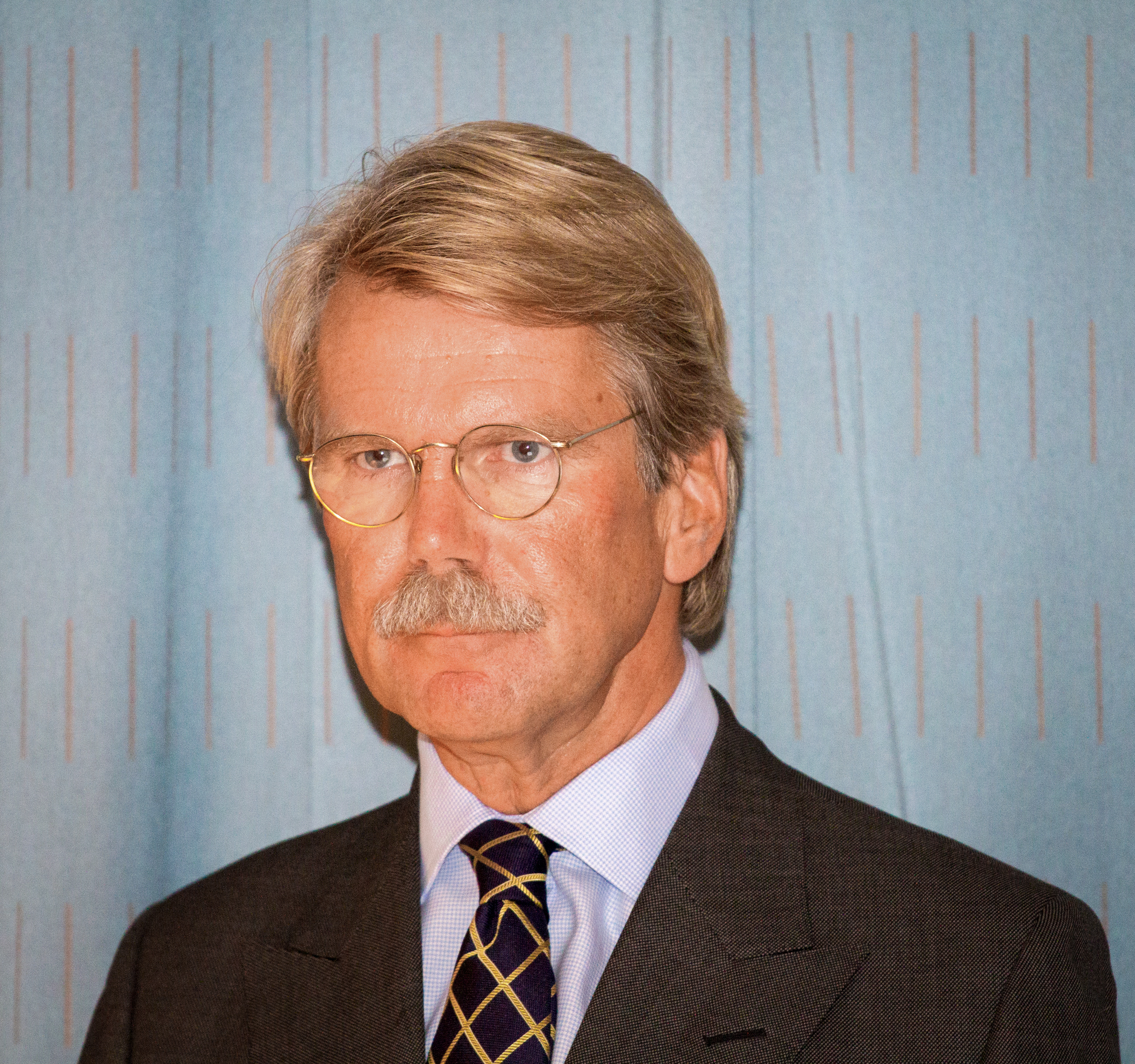
- Wahlroos in 2009
- Born: Björn Arne Christer Wahlroos; 10 October 1952 (age 73); Helsinki, Finland
- Education: Doctor of Economic Sciences (1979)
- Alma mater: Hanken School of Economics
- Spouse: Saara Wahlroos (m. 1977)
- Children: 2
- Parent(s): Bror Wahlroos; Marita Wahlroos

Björn Arne Christer "Nalle" Wahlroos (born 10 October 1952) is a Finnish banker, investor, and the former chairman of the Board in Sampo Group, Nordea and UPM-Kymmene. Before switching to banking, Wahlroos worked as a professor at the Hanken School of Economics in Helsinki, from which he also holds a Doctorate in Economics.

In terms of political economical viewpoint, Wahlroos is known as a defender of laissez-faire economics, and a critic of Keynesian economics and economic regulation. His views against government interference and regulation has prompted criticism and controversy throughout the years, especially as despite Wahlroos' wealth, he has collected hundreds of thousands of euros in Finnish agricultural subsidies.

He owns a mansion in Salo, Finland and a second mansion in Nice, France, in addition to an apartment in Stockholm. Wahlroos has also published several books on economics and the Finnish economy.

His father, Bror "Buntta" Wahlroos, was chief of staff in the Ministry of Trade and Industry. His mother, Marita Wahlroos, was a long-time friend of Martti Ahtisaari, who was a president of Finland (1994–2000) and they both worked in Africa.

== Personal life and family ==
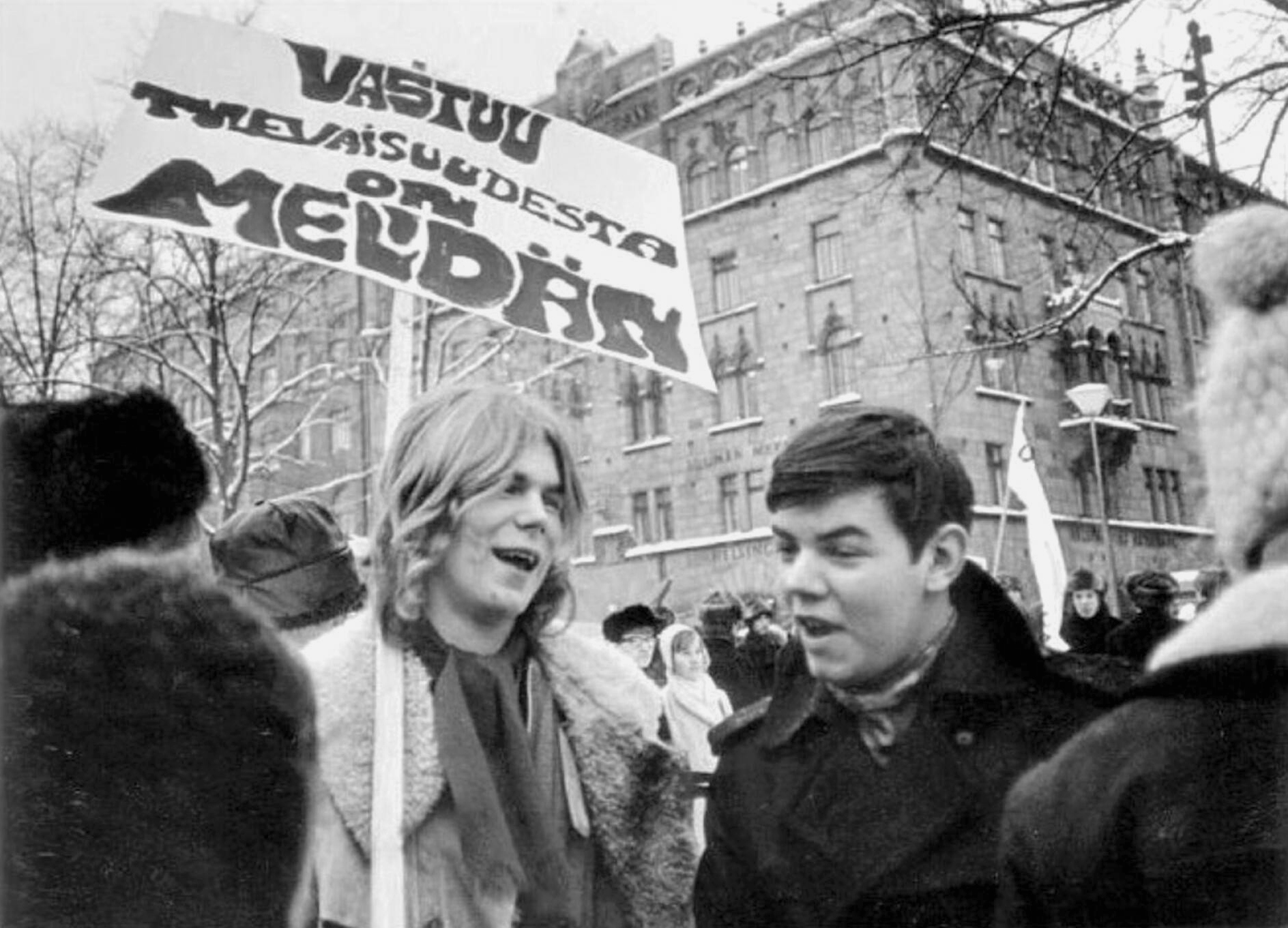
Björn Wahlroos and Leif Salmén at a demonstration in Esplanadi park, in 1969

Born in Helsinki, Wahlroos is a Swedish-speaking Finn. Wahlroos' father Bror "Buntta" Wahlroos (1928–2007) was a well-known economist, who worked at the Finnish Ministry of Trade and Industry from the 1960s until his retirement in 1993. Bror Wahlroos was the Chief of Staff of the ministry for a total of 23 years. Wahlroos' mother, Marita Wahlroos also held a master's degree in economics. Marita Wahlroos worked as a teacher at a business school in Helsinki for several years. After Marita divorced Bror, she worked in numerous African countries in the developmental aid sector.

Wahlroos married Saara Wahlroos in 1977. They have two children, Nina Wahlroos-Grader (born 1977) and Thomas Wahlroos (born 1979). Wahlroos has transferred sums of his wealth to his children, partially to avoid the Finnish inheritance tax and other taxes.

== Career ==
After graduation from the gymnasium Nya svenska samskolan in 1971, Wahlroos studied at the Hanken School of Economics in Helsinki. He graduated as a M.Sc. in 1975 and got his D.Sc. in 1979. The following years were spent in academia; as an acting professor of economics at the Hanken School of Economics and as a visiting professor at Brown University and the Kellogg School of Management at Northwestern University, Illinois, United States.

In 1985, Wahlroos switched career to banking, joining the executive board of Suomen Yhdyspankki (SYP). In 1988, he was appointed Executive vice president and Head of Investment Banking & Treasury at SYP. Together with half a dozen of his colleagues, Wahlroos bought out the investment banking operations of UBF in 1992 and started the partnership Mandatum & Co, which soon became the leading advisor of mergers and acquisitions in Scandinavia. Through a merger with Interbank in 1998, Mandatum was listed on the Helsinki Stock Exchange.

In 2000, Wahlroos merged his banking group into Sampo-Leonia and took over as president and CEO of the combined company, also becoming its biggest private shareholder. In 2009, Wahlroos resigned as CEO and was elected Chairman of Sampo plc, holding company of Sampo Group, which by then had become the biggest insurer in Northern Europe and also the main shareholder of Nordea, the region's largest bank. Between 2011 and 2019, he was chairman of the board of Nordea.

Wahlroos was also chairman of the Board of UPM-Kymmene, the pulp and paper manufacturer.

In late 2022, Wahlroos transferred the ownership in his main investment companies, worth c. EUR 130 million, to his children, in preparation for his planned retirement from daily business activities.

== Politics ==
While a student, Wahlroos was involved in left-wing politics. He was a member of Finlands Svenska Skolungdomsförbundet in 1969–1973 and communist revolutionary student association Sosialistiset taloustieteen opiskelijat in 1971–1973. He left extreme leftist politics in 1973. After this he has withdrawn from active party politics although he is a paying member of the Swedish People's Party. He has nevertheless given public comments that give an indication of his thoughts.

In 2001, he declared himself in favour of a citizen's income in Finland. "Basic security, in my mind, must never be threatened because it is an important part of human modern society", Wahlroos said in the Finnish newspaper Uutispäivä Demari, clearing way to negative income tax thinking. In March 2009, Wahlroos predicted that the economic recession would not endure for long, because the market corrects itself quickly. In March 2010, in an interview in the Image magazine, he spoke of the need to cut Finnish development aid because "we have 50 years of money thrown into a bottomless well". In addition, he has criticized giving grants to university students because it, according to Wahlroos, "supports idleness", and regards agricultural and forestry research expenditures as excessive. In June 2010, Wahlroos told the Financial Times that Europe will have to reconsider the future of the social market economy model, because people cannot be taxed in the future in the current fashion, and poverty and broken families are unsustainable. Wahlroos also believes that agricultural subsidies should be abolished throughout the world: "It is absurd that Finland is with one hand supporting the Zambian agribusiness and the other the EU common agricultural policy. (...) ...giving to developing countries at the same time ... when the EU is to abolish agricultural subsidies and open tariff barriers on agricultural products." At the same time he receives remarkable agricultural subsidies himself.

In 2015, Wahlroos published a book defending his laissez-faire economics viewpoint, De tio sämsta ekonomiska teorierna. Från Keynes till Piketty (The ten worst economic theories: From Keynes to Piketty). In the book he argues, for instance, that stable economic development is difficult to implement in a democratic social system.

Wahlroos is a member of Libera, a foundation organized under Mont Pelerin Society.

== Military ==
In the Finnish Defence Forces, Wahlroos holds the rank of major in the reserves.

== Books published ==
- Wahlroos, Björn: Markkinat ja demokratia. (Otava, 2012) ISBN 978-951-1-25176-7
- Wahlroos, Björn: Talouden kymmenen tuhoisinta ajatusta. (Otava, 2015) ISBN 978-951-1-28592-2
- Wahlroos, Björn: Kuinkas tässä näin kävi? (Otava, 2019) ISBN 978-951-1-35459-8
- Wahlroos, Björn: Barrikaadeilta pankkimaailmaan (Otava, 2021) ISBN 978-951-1-41751-4
