= David Gundlach =

American film producer (1955–2011)

- Born: July 21, 1955; Downey, California, US
- Died: October 16, 2011 (aged 56); Malibu, California
- Occupations: Founder, Hastings Direct

Guy "David" Gundlach (July 21, 1955 – October 16, 2011) was an American entrepreneur, business leader and film producer. He founded the insurance company Hastings Direct and produced the award-winning film Get Low.

== Education and career ==
David Gundlach was born in Downey, California in 1955 to parents Melvin Gundlach and Marjorie (Riblet) Gundlach Swift. When Gundlach was 12, he and his widowed mother moved with her maternal grandmother, Josephine Riblet, who had suffered a stroke. He grew up in Elkhart, Indiana and graduated in 1973 from Elkhart Memorial High School.

He graduated from Chapman College in 1979 and went on to work in the Informational Technology department for IBM. After time at Lloyd's of London, Gundlach, along with Andrew Bowen, founded Hastings Direct, a direct insurance company based in England in 1996. Hastings performed business in countries all over the world and employed over 1,500 people.

Gundlach sold Hastings Direct to Insurance Australia Group in 2006. He went to Los Angeles to launch a movie production company. In 2009, he produced the film Get Low starring Robert Duvall, Sissy Spacek and Bill Murray. Set in the 1930s, a Tennessee hermit throws his own funeral party while still alive. The film won Gundlach an Independent Spirit Award in the category of "Best First Feature" and it was nominated for several other awards.

== Community Foundation of Elkhart County ==
Gundlach died from a heart attack at age 56 on October 16, 2011. Gundlach's hometown of Elkhart, Indiana would soon learn that his estate had bequeathed $125 million to the Community Foundation of Elkhart County. While Gundlach hinted he would one day leave money to the Community Foundation, it was unknown just how much of a fortune Gundlach had amassed, not even to his mother, who was his lone survivor. The gift was expected to multiply the charitable giving of the Community Foundation by ten times. There was also no stipulations as to how the Community Foundation was to spend the money.
