= The Blobjob =

1998 video game

- Developers: Detonium Interactive; Intelligame; Oy Sarajärvi & Hellén
- Publisher: Sampo
- Designers: John Hakalax; Jan Wellmann
- Programmer: Mikko Miettinen
- Artists: Mare Ollinkari; Jussi Raulo
- Composer: Timo Silvast
- Platform: Microsoft Windows
- Release: November 24, 1998
- Genre: Educational
- Mode: Single-player

The Blobjob is an educational adventure video game developed by Detonium Interactive, released by insurance company Sampo in November 1998 for Microsoft Windows.

== Plot and gameplay ==
The player is Joe Ridley, a security officer of the NanoBlob Corporation who needs to prevent an intruder from stealing a piece of technology that could potentially harm the world.

During the game, the player is given a device that miniaturises items in their pockets, which Finnish Video Games: A History and Catalog argues is one of the few instances the endless inventory space is justified in-game.

The game features a series of static screens, features live-action performances, and does not allow the player to save.

== Critical reception ==
Richard Cobbett of PC Gamer deemed it "the strangest edutainment game I've ever played". Muropaketti felt the clumsy full-motion video product would bring new appreciation to hand drawn pixel art. Michał Czajkowski felt its desire to appeal to the lowest common denominator made it lack challenge

The game won the Grand Prize of the Mindtrek Multimedia Competition in Tampere.
