= Washington D.C. Area Film Critics Association Award for Best Supporting Actor =

Annual US film award

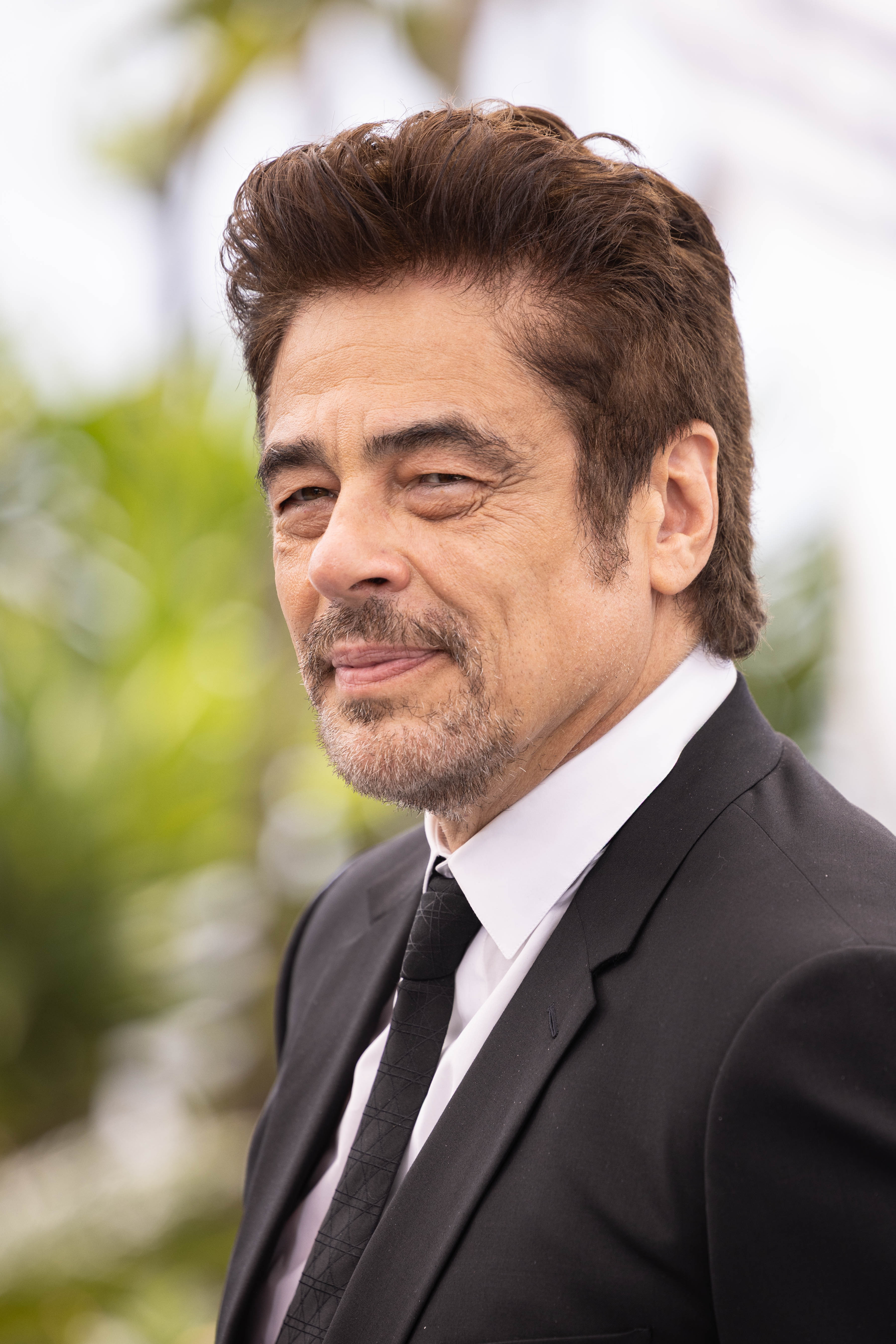
- Current recipient: Benicio del Toro
- Awarded for: Best Performance by an Actor in a Supporting Role
- Country: United States
- Presented by: Washington D.C. Area Film Critics Association
- First award: Dennis Haysbert; Far from Heaven (2002)
- Currently held by: Benicio del Toro; One Battle After Another (2025)

The Washington D.C. Area Film Critics Association Award for Best Supporting Actor is one of the annual awards given by the Washington D.C. Area Film Critics Association.

== Winners and nominees ==
=== 2000s ===
| Year | Actor | Film | Role | Ref. |
|---|---|---|---|---|
| 2002 | Dennis Haysbert | Far from Heaven | Raymond Deagan | |
| 2002 | Chris Cooper | Adaptation. | John Laroche | |
| 2003 | Benicio del Toro | 21 Grams | Jack Jordan | |
| 2003 | Alec Baldwin | The Cooler | Sheldon "Shelly" Kaplow | |
| 2003 | Tim Robbins | Mystic River | Dave Boyle | |
| 2003 | Peter Sarsgaard | Shattered Glass | Chuck Lane | |
| 2003 | Ken Watanabe | The Last Samurai | Lord Moritsugu Katsumoto | |
| 2004 | Jamie Foxx | Collateral | Max Durocher | |
| 2005 | Paul Giamatti | Cinderella Man | Joe Gould | |
| 2005 | Matt Dillon | Crash | Sgt. John Ryan | |
| 2005 | Terrence Howard | Crash | Cameron Thayer | |
| 2005 | Geoffrey Rush | Munich | Ephraim | |
| 2005 | Peter Sarsgaard | Jarhead | Cpl. Alan Troy | |
| 2006 | Djimon Hounsou | Blood Diamond | Solomon Vandy | |
| 2007 | Javier Bardem | No Country for Old Men | Anton Chigurh | |
| 2008 | Heath Ledger (posthumously) | The Dark Knight | The Joker | |
| 2009 | Christoph Waltz | Inglourious Basterds | Col. Hans Landa | |
| 2009 | Woody Harrelson | The Messenger | Capt. Tony Stone | |
| 2009 | Anthony Mackie | The Hurt Locker | Sergeant J. T. Sanborn | |
| 2009 | Alfred Molina | An Education | Jack Mellor | |
| 2009 | Stanley Tucci | The Lovely Bones | George Harvey | |

=== 2010s ===
| Year | Actor | Film | Role | Ref. |
|---|---|---|---|---|
| 2010 | Christian Bale | The Fighter | Dicky Eklund | |
| 2010 | Andrew Garfield | The Social Network | Eduardo Saverin | |
| 2010 | John Hawkes | Winter's Bone | Teardrop Dolly | |
| 2010 | Sam Rockwell | Conviction | Kenneth Waters | |
| 2010 | Geoffrey Rush | The King's Speech | Lionel Logue | |
| 2011 | Albert Brooks | Drive | Bernie Rose | |
| 2011 | Kenneth Branagh | My Week with Marilyn | Laurence Olivier | |
| 2011 | John Hawkes | Martha Marcy May Marlene | Patrick | |
| 2011 | Christopher Plummer | Beginners | Hal Fiels | |
| 2011 | Andy Serkis | Rise of the Planet of the Apes | Caesar | |
| 2012 | Philip Seymour Hoffman | The Master | Lancaster Dodd | |
| 2012 | Alan Arkin | Argo | Lester Seigel | |
| 2012 | Javier Bardem | Skyfall | Raoul Silva | |
| 2012 | Leonardo DiCaprio | Django Unchained | Calvin J. Candie | |
| 2012 | Tommy Lee Jones | Lincoln | Thaddeus Stevens | |
| 2013 | Jared Leto | Dallas Buyers Club | Rayon | |
| 2013 | Daniel Brühl | Rush | Niki Lauda | |
| 2013 | Michael Fassbender | 12 Years a Slave | Edwin Epps | |
| 2013 | James Franco | Spring Breakers | Alien | |
| 2013 | James Gandolfini | Enough Said | Albert | |
| 2014 | J. K. Simmons | Whiplash | Terrence Fletcher | |
| 2014 | Ethan Hawke | Boyhood | Mason Evans Sr. | |
| 2014 | Edward Norton | Birdman or (The Unexpected Virtue of Ignorance) | Mike Shiner | |
| 2014 | Mark Ruffalo | Foxcatcher | David Schultz | |
| 2014 | Andy Serkis | Dawn of the Planet of the Apes | Caesar | |
| 2015 | Idris Elba | Beasts of No Nation | Commandant | |
| 2015 | Paul Dano | Love & Mercy | Brian Wilson (Young) | |
| 2015 | Tom Hardy | The Revenant | John Fitzgerald | |
| 2015 | Mark Rylance | Bridge of Spies | Rudolf Abel | |
| 2015 | Sylvester Stallone | Creed | Rocky Balboa | |
| 2016 | Mahershala Ali | Moonlight | Juan | |
| 2016 | Jeff Bridges | Hell or High Water | Marcus Hamilton | |
| 2016 | Ben Foster | Hell or High Water | Tanner Howard | |
| 2016 | Lucas Hedges | Manchester by the Sea | Patrick Chandler | |
| 2016 | Michael Shannon | Nocturnal Animals | Detective Bobby Andes | |
| 2017 | Sam Rockwell | Three Billboards Outside Ebbing, Missouri | Officer Jason Dixon | |
| 2017 | Willem Dafoe | The Florida Project | Bobby Hicks | |
| 2017 | Armie Hammer | Call Me by Your Name | Oliver | |
| 2017 | Jason Mitchell | Mudbound | Ronsel Jackson | |
| 2017 | Michael Stuhlbarg | Call Me by Your Name | Mr. Perlman | |
| 2018 | Mahershala Ali | Green Book | Don Shirley | |
| 2018 | Timothée Chalamet | Beautiful Boy | Nic Sheff | |
| 2018 | Sam Elliott | A Star Is Born | Bobby Maine | |
| 2018 | Richard E. Grant | Can You Ever Forgive Me? | Jack Hock | |
| 2018 | Michael B. Jordan | Black Panther | N'Jadaka / Erik "Killmonger" Stevens | |
| 2019 | Brad Pitt | Once Upon a Time in Hollywood | Cliff Booth | |
| 2019 | Tom Hanks | A Beautiful Day in the Neighborhood | Fred Rogers | |
| 2019 | Jonathan Majors | The Last Black Man in San Francisco | Montgomery "Mont" Allen | |
| 2019 | Al Pacino | The Irishman | Jimmy Hoffa | |
| 2019 | Joe Pesci | The Irishman | Russell Bufalino | |

=== 2020s ===
| Year | Actor | Film | Role | Ref. |
|---|---|---|---|---|
| 2020 | Leslie Odom Jr. | One Night in Miami... | Sam Cooke | |
| 2020 | Sacha Baron Cohen | The Trial of the Chicago 7 | Abbie Hoffman | |
| 2020 | Daniel Kaluuya | Judas and the Black Messiah | Fred Hampton | |
| 2020 | Bill Murray | On the Rocks | Felix Keane | |
| 2020 | Paul Raci | Sound of Metal | Joe | |
| 2021 | Kodi Smit-McPhee | The Power of the Dog | Peter Gordon | |
| 2021 | Jarmie Dornan | Belfast | Pa | |
| 2021 | Ciarán Hinds | Belfast | Pop | |
| 2021 | Troy Kotsur | CODA | Frank Rossi | |
| 2021 | Jesse Plemons | The Power of the Dog | George Burbank | |
| 2022 | Ke Huy Quan | Everything Everywhere All at Once | Waymond Wang | |
| 2022 | Paul Dano | The Fabelmans | Burt Fabelmans | |
| 2022 | Brendan Gleeson | The Banshees of Inisherin | Colm Doherty | |
| 2022 | Barry Keoghan | The Banshees of Inisherin | Dominic Kearney | |
| 2022 | Ben Whishaw | Women Talking | August | |
| 2023 | Charles Melton | May December | Joe Yoo | |
| 2023 | Sterling K. Brown | American Fiction | Clifford "Cliff" Ellison | |
| 2023 | Robert Downey Jr. | Oppenheimer | Lewis Strauss | |
| 2023 | Ryan Gosling | Barbie | Ken | |
| 2023 | Dominic Sessa | The Holdovers | Angus Tully | |
| 2024 | Kieran Culkin | A Real Pain | Benji Kaplan | |
| 2024 | Yura Borisov | Anora | Igor | |
| 2024 | Clarence Maclin | Sing Sing | Himself | |
| 2024 | Guy Pearce | The Brutalist | Harrison Lee Van Buren | |
| 2024 | Denzel Washington | Gladiator II | Macrinus | |
