= New Worlds: The Cradle of Civilization =

New Worlds: The Cradle of Civilization is a 2022 film of a musical and spoken-word performance by actor Bill Murray, cellist Jan Vogler, and violinist Mira Wang. The filmed performance, on the Acropolis stage in Athens, is of the final night of the performance's world tour.
