= If P&C Insurance =

Nordic insurance company

If P&C Insurance Company Ltd.
- Industry: Insurance, financial services
- Founded: 1999
- Headquarters: Solna, Sweden
- Area served: Sweden, Norway, Finland, Denmark, Estonia, Latvia, Lithuania
- Key people: Morten Thorsrud; CEO
- Products: Insurance annuities, mutual funds
- Owner: Sampo Oyj
- Number of employees: 10,000 (2026)
- Website: if-insurance.com

If P&C Insurance Company Ltd. is a property and casualty insurance company with approximately 3.8 million customers in Sweden, Norway, Finland, Denmark, Estonia, Latvia and Lithuania. In 2025, the group had gross premiums written of SEK 87 billion and 10,000 employees.

If P&C Insurance was formed in 1999 through the merger of the property and casualty insurance operations of Storebrand of Norway and Skandia of Sweden. In 2001, If and Sampo’s property and casualty insurance operations merged.

In 2002, Torbjörn Magnusson was appointed President and CEO.

In the Spring of 2004, Sampo acquired Storebrand's, Skandia's and Skandia Liv's holdings of If shares.
