= Hastings Insurance =

British insurance broker

Hastings Group Holdings

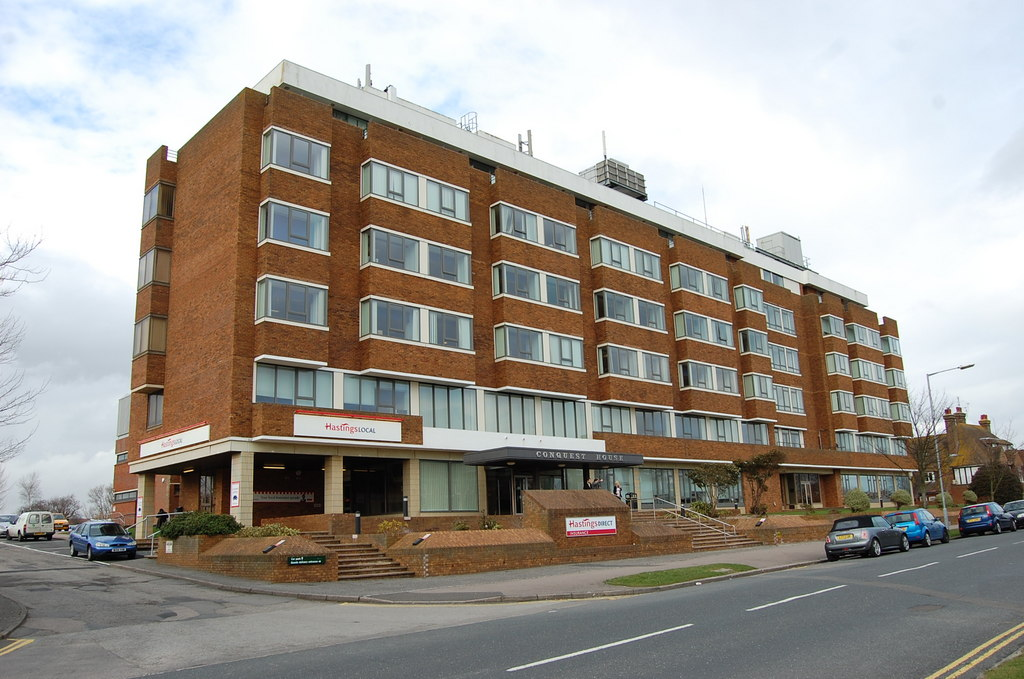
- Type: Private limited company
- Industry: Insurance
- Founded: 1997
- Headquarters: Bexhill-on-Sea, East Sussex, United Kingdom
- Key people: Tom Coltrane (Chairman); Tobias van der Meer (CEO)
- Revenue: £741.3 million (2019)
- Operating income: £109.7 million (2019)
- Net income: £69.7 million (2019)
- Website: www.hastingsplc.com

Hastings Insurance Services Ltd is a UK personal lines insurance broker servicing customers via smartphone mobile app, online, and by phone. The company provides car, bike, van and home insurance, as well as a range of ancillary products and services such as breakdown cover, personal accident, substitute vehicle and key and legal cover. The company also offers unsecured Personal Loans. It is part of the Hastings Group, a business which was listed on the London Stock Exchange until it was acquired by a consortium of the South African business, Rand Merchant International, and the Finnish insurer, Sampo Group, in November 2020.

== History ==
The company was established, based on the business plan prepared by David Gundlach and Andrew Bowen, as "Hastings Direct" in 1997. It was acquired by Insurance Australia Group in 2006 and then by its management in 2009. In 2011 the company announced that 150 new posts would be created, with the first 60 to be recruited in January in the Bexhill, Hastings, Eastbourne, Brighton and Hove areas. Goldman Sachs acquired a 50% interest in the company in 2013. The company was the subject of an initial public offering in October 2015.

== Operations ==
The company trades under the Hastings Direct, Hastings Premier, Hastings Essential, YouDrive, People's Choice and InsurePink brands. In 2012, the company launched a usage-based insurance product under the Hastings Direct YouDrive brand. The YouDrive product requires a telematics device to be fitted to the insured vehicle.

Insurance policies provided by the company are issued by a panel of insurers, including Advantage Insurance Company Limited, a Gibraltar based company.

The company is known for its mascot, Harry Hastings, an animated figure dressed in armour from the Battle of Hastings in 1066. He is also known for singing a catchy tune of the number 0800 00 1066 (with the final 4-digit number being a reference about the Battle of Hastings.) Based in Bexhill-on-Sea, the company is one of the largest employers on the South Coast. The company also has a second call centre in Leicester.

Toby van der Meer became the CEO of Hastings Group on 1 March 2018. The previous CEO, Gary Hoffman, became non-executive chairman.

In August 2020 it was announced that the company would be acquired by a consortium of the South African business, Rand Merchant International, and the Finnish insurer, Sampo Group, for £1.7 billion. The transaction was completed on 16 November 2020.

== Sponsorship ==
The company sponsored the Eastbourne International tennis tournament between 2003 and 2007 in a deal worth £350,000 per year.
