= Image (Finnish magazine) =

Finnish magazine

Image is a Finnish magazine published 11 times per year based in Helsinki. The magazine deals with contemporary phenomena from popular culture to politics. The magazine is known for its extensive articles. Image is one of the oldest lifestyle magazines in Finland. The magazine was founded in 1985. In the early 1990s the magazine changed from a cultural album published four times per year to a general cultural magazine.

The magazine's founded Raoul Grünstein owned the magazine up to 2005, when he sold the majority of Image Kustannus Oy to A-lehdet Oy. Since 2007 Image Kustannus Oy has been a fully owned daughter company of A-lehdet. According to a survey done by Kansallinen Mediatutkimus in 2020 Image had 51 thousand readers.

The editor-in-chief of Image has been Niklas Thesslund since 2017. His predecessors as editor-in-chief have included Heikki Valkama from 2013 to 2017 and Mikko Numminen from 2003 to 2013.

== Literature ==
- Harkki, Juliana: Harkittu tyyli. Kirjan tekstit ja kuvat julkaistu Image-lehdessä 2002–2006. Helsinki: Image, 2006. ISBN 952-99247-9-8.
