= Get Low (film) =

2010 American drama film

- Theatrical release poster
- Directed by: Aaron Schneider
- Screenplay by: Chris Provenzano; C. Gaby Mitchell; Scott Seeke
- Story by: Chris Provenzano; Scott Seeke
- Produced by: Dean Zanuck; David Gundlach
- Starring: Robert Duvall; Sissy Spacek; Bill Murray; Lucas Black; Gerald McRaney; Bill Cobbs
- Cinematography: David Boyd
- Edited by: Aaron Schneider
- Music by: Jan A. P. Kaczmarek
- Production companies: K5 International; Zanuck Independent; David Gundlach Productions; Lara Enterprises; TVN; Butcher's Run Films
- Distributed by: Sony Pictures Classics
- Release dates: September 12, 2009 (TIFF); July 30, 2010 (United States)
- Running time: 100 minutes
- Country: United States
- Language: English
- Budget: $7 million
- Box office: $10.8 million

Get Low is a 2009 American independent Southern Gothic drama film directed by Aaron Schneider, and written by Chris Provenzano and C. Gaby Mitchell. It tells the story of a Tennessee hermit in the 1930s who throws his own funeral party while still alive. The film stars Robert Duvall, Bill Murray, Sissy Spacek and Lucas Black. Duvall was awarded the Hollywood Film Festival Award for Best Actor for his lead performance.

== Plot ==
In 1930s rural Tennessee, Felix Bush lives as a hermit in the woods. Rumors surround him, such as how he might have killed in cold blood, and that he's in league with the devil. So, the nearby town is surprised when Felix shows up at Reverend Gassy Horton's church with a large roll of cash and requests a "funeral party" for himself, which Rev. Horton refuses to do. Frank Quinn, the owner of the local, financially troubled funeral parlor, covets Bush's money and agrees to advertise and help organize a funeral party. Townsfolk and others in the area are invited to come to the event and tell Felix Bush the stories they've heard about him. To ensure a good turnout, Bush insists upon a raffle, with his property as the prize; many people buy tickets at $5 a piece (equivalent to $110 in 2025).

Things get more complicated when an old mystery is remembered, involving a local widow named Mattie Darrow, who was Bush's girlfriend in their youth, and her deceased sister, Mary Lee Stroup. With the help of Charlie Jackson, a preacher who insists upon the truth from forty years ago being revealed, Bush intends to confess his shame about and complicity in a terrible occurrence. He reveals to Mattie his affair with her married sister, Mary Lee, telling her that it was Mary Lee who was his true love, his only love. To the people gathered for his funeral party, he tells the story of how the two of them made plans to run away together and, when she didn't arrive at the agreed place, he went to her home to search for her. He discovered that her husband had attacked her with a hammer, knocking her out. The husband threw a kerosene lamp against a wall to set the house on fire and kill himself, the unconscious Mary Lee, and Bush. Bush freed himself from the attacking husband, but as his clothes caught fire, he also saw Mary Lee catch fire. As he went to put the fire out, he felt himself flying through the window, possibly pushed by the husband, and he was unable to re-enter the house to save Mary Lee.

Mattie leaves the party, the raffle is held and a winner proclaimed. Later, after everything has been packed away and everyone has gone, Mattie returns; she seems to have forgiven Bush. He dies shortly after, walking toward whom he sees as Mary Lee coming down the lane toward him.

His actual funeral service and burial is held in a small area of his property where he has, over the years, buried his animal companions. Charlie officiates the ceremony, with Reverend Gus Horton, Buddy, his wife and child, Mattie and Frank in attendance. After a short benediction from Charlie, Mattie places a portrait of her sister, Mary Lee, on Felix's casket, allowing them to be together, even if only figuratively. As his grave is filled, the mourners leave.

== Cast ==
- Robert Duvall as Felix Bush
- Sissy Spacek as Mattie Darrow
- Bill Murray as Frank Quinn
- Lucas Black as Buddy Robinson
- Gerald McRaney as Rev. Gus Horton
- Bill Cobbs as Rev. Charlie Jackson
- Scott Cooper as Carl
- Lori Beth Edgeman as Kathryn Robinson
- Blerim Destani as Gary
- Tomasz Karolak as Orville
- Arin Logan as Mary Lee Stroup
- Andrea Powell as Bonnie
- Rebecca Grant as Joan
- Chandler Riggs as Tom
- Danny Vinson as Grier
- Andy Stahl as Photographer

== Production ==
The film is loosely based on a true story that happened in Roane County, Tennessee, in 1938. Duvall's character, Felix Bush, was based on a real person named Felix Bushaloo "Uncle Bush" Breazeale. It was filmed entirely on location in Georgia, with support for the production provided by the Georgia Department of Economic Development.

== Release ==
The film premiered at the Toronto International Film Festival and is distributed by Sony Pictures Classics. It was released on July 30, 2010, in the United States, opening in four cinemas and taking in a weekend gross of $90,900, averaging $22,725 per cinema. This placed the film at twenty-third overall for the weekend of July 30 to August 1, 2010. As of January 2011, the film had grossed $9,100,230 in North America and $401,361 in other territories, totaling $9,513,225 worldwide.

== Reception ==
On review aggregator Rotten Tomatoes, the film has an approval rating of 84% based on 143 reviews, with an average rating of 7.20/10. The site's critics consensus reads: "Subtle to a fault, this perfectly cast ensemble drama is lifted by typically sharp performances from Robert Duvall and Bill Murray." On Metacritic, the film has a weighted average score of 77 out of 100, based on 35 critics, indicating "generally favorable" reviews.

Robert Duvall had overwhelming praise from critics, with John Anderson of The Wall Street Journal writing: "... Mr. Duvall... gives [the film] a heart." A New York Times review by A. O. Scott highlighted Duvall's "superb" performance as well.

Casey Burchby at DVD Talk noted that Get Low contains "a wonderful group of performances by a dream cast. Surprisingly, none of the leads were in the running for any of 2010's major awards."

Schneider won the Independent Spirit Award for Best First Feature for the film.
