= Sampo Group =

European insurance company

Sampo plc
- Native name: Sampo Oyj
- Type: Public company
- Traded as: Nasdaq Helsinki: SAMPO; OMXH25 component
- ISIN: FI4000552500
- Industry: Insurance
- Founded: 1909
- Headquarters: Fabianinkatu 21; Helsinki, Finland
- Key people: Morten Thorsrud (CEO); Antti Mäkinen; Annica Witschard; Astrid Stange; Andreas Brandstetter; Markus Rauramo; Risto Murto; Sara Mella; Steve Langan
- Products: Insurance
- Operating income: EUR 2,436 million (2025)
- Number of employees: 15,003 (FTE, 2025)
- Website: www.sampo.com

Sampo Group is a property and casualty (P&C) insurance group with operations in the Nordics, Baltics, and the UK. Sampo operates in four segments: Private in the Nordics and the UK, and Commercial and Industrial in the Nordics.

Sampo is made up of the parent company Sampo plc and the customer brands If P&C Insurance, Danish insurer Topdanmark and British P&C insurer Hastings Insurance. The parent company is responsible for the group's strategy, capital allocation, risk management, group accounts, investor relations, sustainability, and legal and tax matters.

Sampo Group employs over 15,000 employees. The managing director of Sampo plc and the CEO of Sampo Group is Morten Thorsrud.

== History ==
The story of Sampo began in 1909, when the Mutual Insurance Company Sampo was established in Turku, Finland.

The 1980s were a turning point in Sampo's history. In 1987, Sampo changed its company type from a mutual insurance company to a limited company. The company's insurance customers became shareholders, and Sampo was listed on the Helsinki Stock Exchange in January 1988.

Sampo's acquisition of state-owned Leonia Bank was the number one business news story at the turn of the millennium. Sampo's Annual General Meeting approved the merger in April 2000. The Finnish state became the largest owner of Sampo-Leonia.

Leonia Bank became Sampo Bank in February 2001, and Investment Bank Mandatum joined Sampo Group later that spring. Björn Wahlroos became Group CEO and President and brought with him a new type of thinking derived from his banking expertise. The focus of operations shifted towards bank services and long-term savings.

In 2002, Sampo became a shareholder of the Nordic property and casualty insurance company If. Two years later, Sampo bought out the Norwegian company Storebrand, the Swedish-owned Skandia, and the Finnish insurance company Varma, making itself the sole owner of If.

In 2006, Sampo Group announced a historic divestment, selling its banking operations, known as Sampo Bank, to the Danish Danske Bank for over €4 billion (US$4.5 billion). This sale allowed Sampo to focus on its insurance business, with the proceeds invested in shares of Nordea, the largest bank in the Nordic region, until Sampo sold its entire holding in Nordea in April 2022.

On 29 March 2023 the Board proposed a demerger of Sampo plc by separating Mandatum from Sampo. The Annual General Meeting approved the demerger plan on 17 May 2023. The partial demerger of Sampo plc became effective on 1 October 2023.

In June 2024 Sampo announced its decision to make a recommended, best and final public exchange offer to acquire all of the outstanding shares in Topdanmark not already owned by Sampo. The preliminary result of the offer was announced on 10 September 2024 and the final result on 16 September 2024. Sampo considered all conditions satisfied and completed the offer. The compulsory acquisition of the remaining Topdanmark minority shares was completed on 25 October 2024.

== Structure ==
Nowadays, Sampo Group consists of the parent company Sampo plc and the customer brands:

- If, which is the largest P&C insurer in the Nordic Countries;
- the Danish P&C insurance company Topdanmark and
- P&C insurer Hastings in the UK.

Through its customer brands, Sampo operates in Finland, Sweden, Norway, Denmark, Baltic countries, and the UK.

== Board of Directors ==
Selected board members at the Annual General Meeting held on April 22, 2026:

- Antti Mäkinen, Chair of the Board since 17 May 2023, Board member 2018–2021
- Risto Murto, Vice Chair of the Board since 23 April 2025, board member since 16 April 2015
- Andreas Brandstetter, board member since 22 April 2026
- Steve Langan, board member since 18 May 2022
- Sara Mella, board member since 23 April 2025
- Markus Rauramo, board member since 19 May 2021
- Astrid Stange, board member since 25 April 2024
- Annica Witschard, board member since 17 May 2023

== Shareholders ==
Sampo has A shares and B shares. Sampo plc's A share has been listed on NASDAQ OMX Helsinki (former Helsinki Stock Exchange) since January 1988 and is nowadays one of the most valuable companies on Nasdaq Helsinki. Sampo is also listed on Nasdaq's exchanges in Stockholm and Copenhagen.

The largest registered shareholders by number of shares (31 December 2025). The list does not include owners of nominee-registered shares.

Shareholder structure (31 December 2025)
Name	Shares (pcs)	Percentile
Solidium Oy	164,392,900	6.16%
Varma Mutual Pension Insurance Company	111,242,100	4.17%
Ilmarinen Mutual Pension Insurance Company	43,405,100	1.63%
Oy Lival AB	21,160,000	0.79%
Elo Mutual Pension Insurance Company	19,488,000	0.73%

At the end of 2025, Sampo had over 195,000 shareholders. Approximately 64 per cent of shares were held by foreign and nominee registered shareholders.

== Sustainability ==
In 2017, Sampo plc published the first group-level sustainability report. In 2019, the Group joined the UN Global Compact initiative and signed the UN PRI. In addition to the group-level sustainability reporting, each individual Sampo Group company publishes their own sustainability reports annually.

== Name ==
In Finnish mythology, the name "Sampo" refers to a mythical machine that creates salt, food, flour and gold out of nothing.

== See also ==
- List of Finnish companies
