= On the Rocks (film) =

2020 film directed by Sofia Coppola

- Release poster
- Directed by: Sofia Coppola
- Written by: Sofia Coppola
- Produced by: Sofia Coppola; Youree Henley
- Starring: Bill Murray; Rashida Jones; Marlon Wayans
- Cinematography: Philippe Le Sourd
- Edited by: Sarah Flack
- Music by: Phoenix
- Production company: American Zoetrope
- Distributed by: A24; Apple TV+
- Release dates: September 22, 2020 (NYFF); October 2, 2020 (United States); October 23, 2020 (Apple TV+)
- Running time: 96 minutes
- Country: United States
- Language: English
- Box office: $1 million

On the Rocks is a 2020 American comedy-drama film written and directed by Sofia Coppola. It follows a father and daughter (Bill Murray and Rashida Jones) as they harbor suspicions about her husband's (Marlon Wayans) fidelity. It had its world premiere at the New York Film Festival on September 22, 2020. It received a limited theatrical release on October 2, 2020, by A24, followed by digital streaming on October 23, 2020, by Apple TV+. It received positive reviews from critics, who noted it as lighter than Coppola's previous films, and praised Murray's performance.

== Plot ==
Laura and Dean are a married couple living in Manhattan with two young daughters, Maya and Theo. Laura is a novelist who is stuck in a rut as she struggles to finish her latest book. Dean is a successful entrepreneur at a burgeoning tech start-up, surrounded by young and attractive co-workers, often leaving Laura in charge of their daughters. One night, after arriving home from one of his frequent business trips, Dean climbs into bed and begins to kiss Laura passionately. However, once he recognizes her voice, he abruptly stops and goes to sleep, much to Laura's confusion. The next day, Laura finds a woman's toiletry bag in Dean's luggage; he later explains that it belongs to his business associate, Fiona, and he offered to carry it in his suitcase because she could not fit it in her carry-on.

Laura confides her misgivings about Dean to her father, Felix, a wealthy, semiretired art dealer. A longtime playboy, Felix flirts with most women he encounters and believes that men are biologically wired to cheat. Convinced that Dean is having an affair, Felix proposes an investigation into him and encourages Laura to check his phone for incriminating text messages. Laura reluctantly does so, but finds nothing out of the ordinary.

While away on a business trip, Dean FaceTimes Laura on her birthday and surprises her with a gift, a Thermomix, about which she does not seem particularly excited. Despite previously insisting that she did not want to celebrate her birthday, Laura agrees to go out to a restaurant with Felix. He reveals that he had Dean followed and he was spotted shopping for jewelry at Cartier. As Laura grows suspicious, Felix picks her up in his vintage sports car and convinces her to stake out Dean as he attends a work dinner. After Dean leaves in a cab with Fiona, Felix speeds through the streets after them, but Laura and he end up pulled over by two police officers due to reckless driving. Felix knows the father of one of the officers, using this to charm his way out of a ticket.

Felix later discovers that Dean is planning a trip to a Mexican resort, which Laura does not believe. The next day, Dean casually tells her about the trip. Upon learning that Fiona is going on the trip as well, an increasingly suspicious Laura calls Felix, who convinces her to follow Dean to Mexico to spy on him. At the resort, Laura and Felix argue over his infidelity. Felix says he felt undervalued by her mother after their children were born, but Laura asserts that his expectations regarding women's affections are unattainable. They eventually spot a woman in Dean's room one evening. When Laura rushes in to confront Dean, she is surprised to find Fiona in the room with her female friend. Dean then calls Laura to inform her that he left early and is on his way back home. Realizing her mistake, Laura lashes out at Felix, berating him for his selfishness and poor treatment of her mother.

Back in New York, Laura and Dean have a heart-to-heart conversation, in which they share their respective fears and insecurities; she had been feeling alienated from him due to his constant business trips, while he says he had been busy working because he wanted to be a better provider for his family. They reconcile, and Laura overcomes her writer's block. Some time later, Felix visits Laura and the two make amends. While at a restaurant, Dean surprises Laura with a second birthday gift—an engraved Cartier watch. Laura takes off the vintage watch Felix had previously given her and puts on Dean's.

== Cast ==
- Rashida Jones as Laura Keane
- Bill Murray as Felix Keane
- Marlon Wayans as Dean
- Jessica Henwick as Fiona Saunders
- Jenny Slate as Vanessa
- Liyanna Muscat as Maya
- Alexandra and Anna Reimer as Theo
- Barbara Bain as Gran Keane
- Juliana Canfield as Amanda Keane
- Alva Chinn as Diane
- Chase Sui Wonders as Chase

== Production ==
On November 15, 2018, it was announced that Apple had entered into a multi-year agreement with entertainment company A24 to produce a slate of original films in partnership with their worldwide video unit. On January 15, 2019, it was announced that the first film produced under that partnership would be directed by Sofia Coppola and titled On the Rocks.

Alongside the film's initial announcement, it was confirmed that it would star Bill Murray and Rashida Jones. In April 2019, Marlon Wayans joined the cast of the film. In June 2019, Jessica Henwick joined the cast of the film. By July, Jenny Slate had been announced as joining the cast.

Principal photography for the film began in June 2019 in New York City.

== Release ==
On the Rocks had its world premiere at the New York Film Festival on September 22, 2020. It received a limited theatrical release by A24 on October 2, 2020, followed by digital streaming on October 23, 2020, by Apple TV+.

== Reception ==
=== Critical response ===
On review aggregator Rotten Tomatoes, the film has an approval rating of 87% based on 290 critic reviews, with an average rating of 7.3/10. The website's critics consensus reads: "On the Rocks isn't as potent as its top-shelf ingredients might suggest, but the end result still goes down easy – and offers high proof of Bill Murray's finely aged charm." On Metacritic, the film has a weighted average score of 73 out of 100 based on 47 critics, indicating "generally favorable reviews".

David Ehrlich of IndieWire gave the film a "B+" and said that "On the Rocks isn't destined to achieve the same kind of iconic status as some of Coppola's previous work. It isn't disposable, but it also doesn't offer anything to obsess about, which is a real change of pace for a filmmaker who launched a zillion Tumblrs and Pinterest boards and gave humanity the gif of Emma Watson saying 'I wanna rob.'" Owen Gleiberman of Variety said that "On the Rocks turns into a boozy humanistic hang-out caper movie, one that's light-spirited and compelling, mordantly alive to the ins and outs of marriage, and a winning showcase for Murray's aging-like-fine-whisky brand of world-weary deviltry." A. A. Dowd of The A.V. Club gave the film a B, praising Murray's performance as "an irresistible star turn, loose and funny and comfortable" but calling it weak among Coppola's work.

Other reviews were less glowing. Socialist magazine Jacobin's Eileen Jones described the film as, "another meandering depiction of life as a bored and alienated celebrity," and noted it for being, "Extraordinarily vapid ... oblivious to its own world of wealth, privilege, and access."

=== Accolades ===
Award	Date of ceremony	Category	Recipient(s)	Result	Ref.
Sunset Film Circle Awards	December 1, 2020	Best Supporting Actor	Bill Murray	Nominated	
Indiana Film Journalists Association	December 20, 2020	Best Supporting Actor	Bill Murray	Nominated	
Chicago Film Critics Association Awards	December 21, 2020	Best Supporting Actor	Bill Murray	Nominated	
Florida Film Critics Circle Awards	December 21, 2020	Best Supporting Actor	Bill Murray	Nominated	
Greater Western New York Film Critics Association Awards	December 31, 2020	Best Supporting Actor	Bill Murray	Nominated	
Chicago Indie Critics Awards	January 2, 2021	Best Supporting Actor	Bill Murray	Nominated	
Alliance of Women Film Journalists	January 4, 2021	Best Supporting Actor	Bill Murray	Nominated	
North Carolina Film Critics Association	January 4, 2021	Best Supporting Actor	Bill Murray	Nominated	
Columbus Film Critics Association	January 7, 2021	Best Supporting Actor	Bill Murray	Nominated	
Music City Film Critics' Association Awards	January 11, 2021	Best Supporting Actor	Bill Murray	Nominated	
San Diego Film Critics Society Awards	January 11, 2021	Best Supporting Actor	Bill Murray	Nominated	
San Diego Film Critics Society Awards	January 11, 2021	Best Comedic Performance	Bill Murray	Runner-up	
San Diego Film Critics Society Awards	January 11, 2021	Best Original Screenplay	Sofia Coppola	Nominated	
Hawaii Film Critics Society	January 12, 2021	Best Supporting Actor	Bill Murray	Nominated	
North Dakota Film Society	January 15, 2021	Best Original Song	Thomas Mars, Christian Mazzalai, Laurent Brancowitz, Deck D'Arcy	Nominated	
St. Louis Film Critics Association	January 17, 2021	Best Comedy Film	On the Rocks	Nominated	
St. Louis Film Critics Association	January 17, 2021	Best Supporting Actor	Bill Murray	Nominated	
Denver Film Critics Society	January 18, 2021	Best Supporting Actor	Bill Murray	Nominated	
Houston Film Critics Society Awards	January 18, 2021	Best Supporting Actor	Bill Murray	Nominated	
Online Film Critics Society Awards	January 25, 2021	Best Supporting Actor	Bill Murray	Nominated	
North Texas Film Critics Association	January 26, 2021	Best Supporting Actor	Bill Murray	Nominated	
Washington D.C. Area Film Critics Association	February 8, 2021	Best Supporting Actor	Bill Murray	Nominated	
Dallas-Ft. Worth Film Critics Association Awards	February 10, 2021	Best Supporting Actor	Bill Murray	Runner-up	
Satellite Awards	February 15, 2021	Best Motion Picture – Comedy or Musical	On the Rocks	Nominated	
Satellite Awards	February 15, 2021	Best Actress in a Motion Picture – Comedy or Musical	Rashida Jones	Nominated	
Satellite Awards	February 15, 2021	Best Supporting Actor – Motion Picture	Bill Murray	Nominated	
Seattle Film Critics Society	February 15, 2021	Best Actor in a Supporting Role	Bill Murray	Nominated	
Golden Globe Awards	February 28, 2021	Best Supporting Actor – Motion Picture	Bill Murray	Nominated	
Final Draft Awards	March 2, 2021	Storyteller Award - Film	Sofia Coppola	Won	
Hollywood Critics Association	March 5, 2021	Best Female Director	Sofia Coppola	Nominated	
Hollywood Critics Association	March 5, 2021	Best Comedy/Musical	On the Rocks	Nominated	
Critics' Choice Movie Awards	March 7, 2021	Best Comedy	On the Rocks	Nominated	
Critics' Choice Movie Awards	March 7, 2021	Best Supporting Actor	Bill Murray	Nominated	
AARP Movies for Grownups Awards	March 28, 2021	Best Supporting Actor	Bill Murray	Nominated	
AARP Movies for Grownups Awards	March 28, 2021	Best Intergenerational Film	On the Rocks	Nominated	
American Cinema Editors Eddie Awards	April 17, 2021	Best Edited Feature Film – Comedy	Sarah Flack	Nominated	
