= Bill Murray =

American actor and comedian (born 1950)

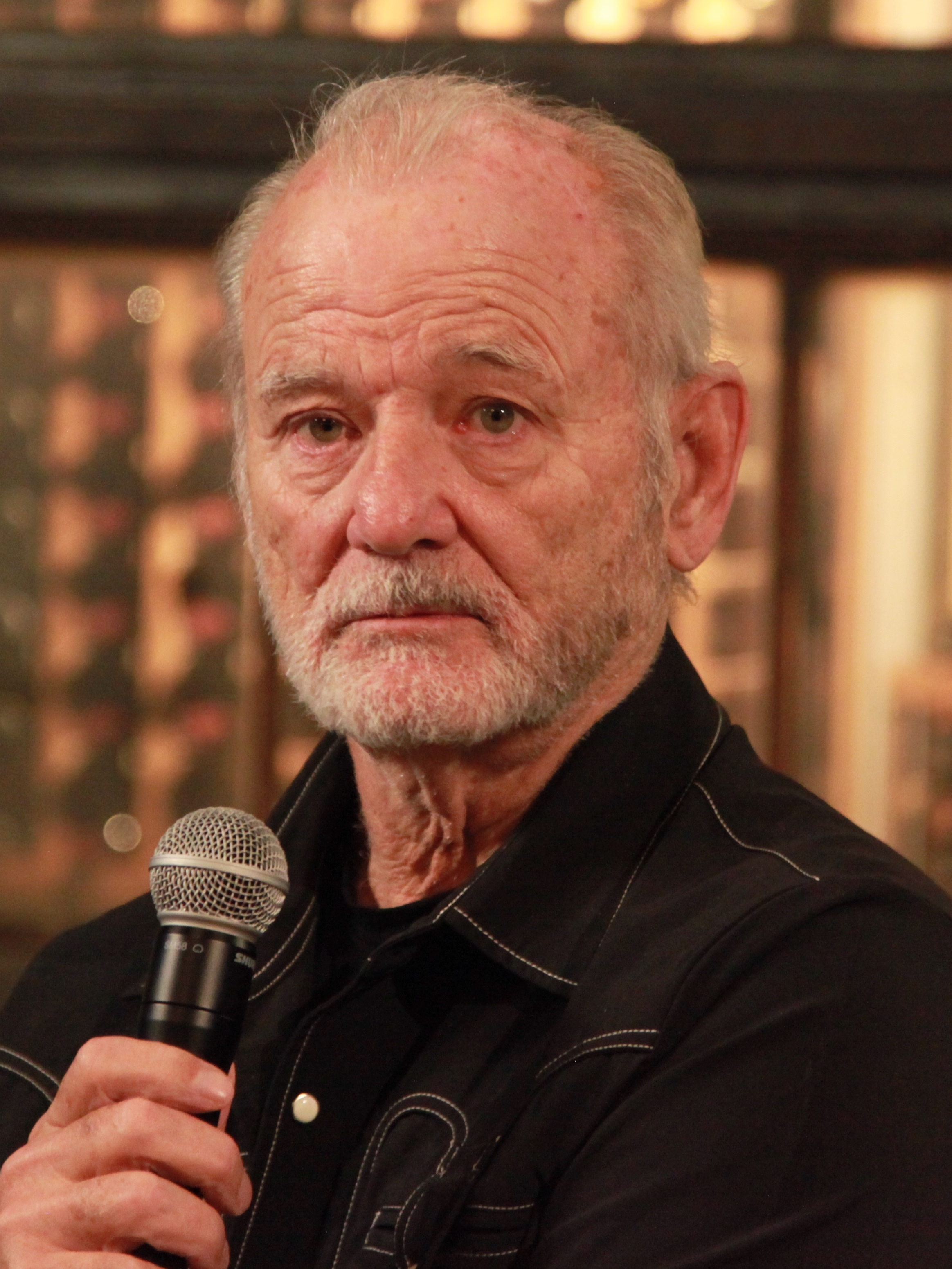
- Murray at the 2025 Sundance Film Festival
- Born: William James Murray; September 21, 1950 (age 76); Evanston, Illinois, U.S.
- Occupations: Actor; comedian
- Years active: 1973–present
- Spouses: Margaret Kelly (m. 1981; div. 1996); Jennifer Butler (m. 1997; div. 2008)
- Children: 6, including Luke Murray
- Relatives: Brian Doyle-Murray (brother); Joel Murray (brother)
- Awards: Full list

William James Murray (born September 21, 1950) is an American actor and comedian, known for his deadpan delivery in roles ranging from studio comedies to independent dramas. He has received several accolades including a BAFTA Award, a Golden Globe Award, and two Primetime Emmy Awards as well as a nomination for an Academy Award. Murray was awarded the Mark Twain Prize for American Humor in 2016.

Murray became a national presence on Saturday Night Live from 1977 to 1980, receiving a Primetime Emmy Award for Outstanding Writing for a Variety Series. He established his stardom by acting in a string of successful comedy films, including Meatballs (1979), Caddyshack (1980), Stripes (1981), Scrooged (1988), What About Bob? (1991), and Groundhog Day (1993). He also had supporting roles in Tootsie (1982), Little Shop of Horrors (1986), Ed Wood (1994), Kingpin (1996) and Osmosis Jones (2001). Murray also starred as Dr. Peter Venkman in Ghostbusters (1984), and Ghostbusters II (1989) and has reprised his role in various projects within the Ghostbusters franchise. He has done voice acting work in films, such as Garfield (2004), Garfield: A Tail of Two Kitties (2006), and The Jungle Book (2016).

He has frequently collaborated with director Wes Anderson, acting in ten of his films starting with Rushmore (1998), followed by roles in films such as The Royal Tenenbaums (2001), The Life Aquatic with Steve Zissou (2004), Fantastic Mr. Fox (2009), Moonrise Kingdom (2012), The Grand Budapest Hotel (2014), and Isle of Dogs (2018). He played an aging actor in Sofia Coppola's dramedy Lost in Translation (2003), earning Golden Globe and BAFTA Awards as well as a nomination for the Academy Award for Best Actor. He also acted in films such as Broken Flowers (2005), Zombieland (2009), Get Low (2010), Hyde Park on Hudson (2012), St. Vincent (2014), On the Rocks (2020), and The Friend (2024).

== Early life ==
Murray was born on September 21, 1950, in Evanston, Illinois, a suburb of Chicago. His mother, Lucille Murray, was a mail room clerk, and his father, Edward Murray II, was a lumber salesman. He attended Loyola Academy, an all-boys Jesuit private school in Wilmette.

Murray and his eight siblings grew up in an Irish Catholic family. His paternal grandfather was from County Cork, while his maternal ancestors were from County Galway. Three of his siblings, John Murray, Joel Murray and Brian Doyle-Murray, are also actors. A sister, Nancy, is an Adrian Dominican nun in Michigan; she has traveled the United States in two one-woman programs, portraying Catherine of Siena and Dorothy Stang. His brother Ed Murray died in 2020. Their father died in 1967 at the age of 46 from complications of diabetes when Murray was 17.

As a youth, Murray read children's biographies of American heroes like Kit Carson, Wild Bill Hickok and Davy Crockett. He attended St. Joseph's grade school and Loyola Academy. During his teen years, he worked as a golf caddy to fund his education at the Jesuit high school, was the lead singer of a rock band (the Dutch Masters) and took part in high school and community theater. One of his sisters had polio and his mother suffered several miscarriages.

On September 21, 1970, his 20th birthday, the police arrested Murray at Chicago's O'Hare Airport for trying to smuggle 10 lb (4.5 kg) of cannabis, which he had allegedly intended to sell. It was discovered after Murray joked to the passenger next to him that he had packed a bomb in his luggage. Murray was convicted and sentenced to probation.

After graduating from Loyola Academy, Murray attended Regis University in Denver, Colorado, taking pre-medical courses, but quickly dropped out and returned to Illinois. In 2007, Regis awarded him an honorary Doctor of Humanities degree.

== Career ==
=== 1974–1979: Early work and Saturday Night Live ===
With an invitation from his older brother Brian Doyle-Murray, Murray got his start at Chicago's The Second City, an improvisational comedy troupe, studying under Del Close. In 1974, he moved to New York City and was recruited by John Belushi as a featured player on The National Lampoon Radio Hour.

In 1975, the Off-Broadway The National Lampoon Show led to his first television role as a cast member of the ABC variety show Saturday Night Live with Howard Cosell. That same season, another variety show, NBC's Saturday Night, premiered. Cosell's show lasted just one season, canceled in early 1976. After working in Los Angeles with the "guerrilla video" commune TVTV on several projects, Murray rose to prominence in 1976. He officially joined the cast of NBC's Saturday Night Live for the show's second season, following the departure of Chevy Chase. A Rutland Weekend Television sketch Monty Python's Eric Idle brought for his appearance on SNL developed into the mockumentary All You Need Is Cash (1978). Murray appeared as "Bill Murray the K", a send-up of New York radio host Murray the K, in a segment that parodies the Maysles Brothers's documentary The Beatles: The First U.S. Visit. During the first few seasons of SNL, Murray was in a romantic relationship with fellow cast member Gilda Radner. Murray landed his first starring role with Meatballs (1979).

=== 1980–1993: Work with Harold Ramis ===
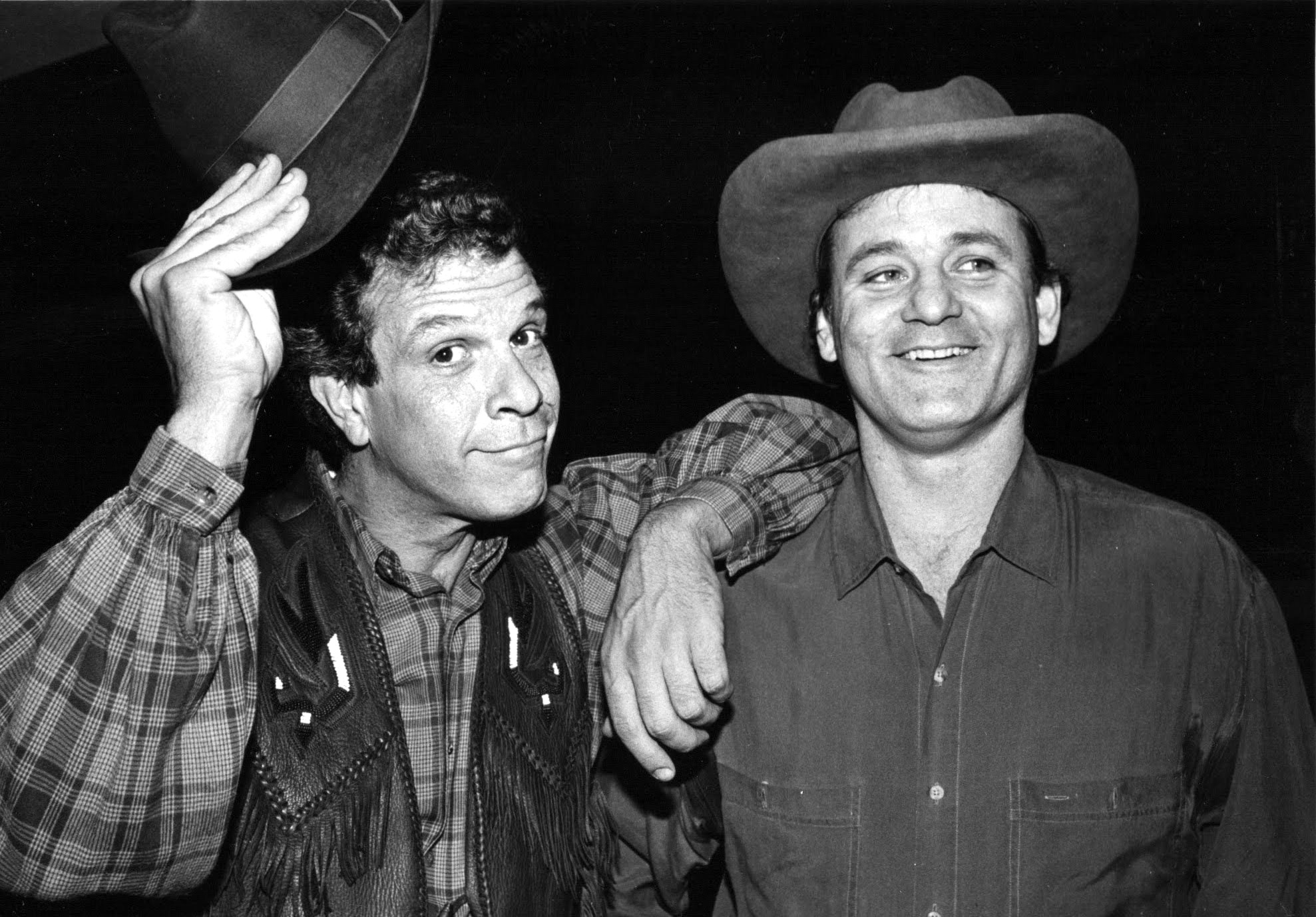
Murray (right) with Paul Binder in 1989

In the early 1980s, he collaborated with writer-director Harold Ramis and starred in a string of box-office hits, including Caddyshack (1980) and Stripes (1981) and had a role in Tootsie (1982). He portrayed Hunter S. Thompson in Where the Buffalo Roam (1980). Murray was the first guest on NBC's Late Night with David Letterman on February 1, 1982. He later appeared on the first episode of the Late Show with David Letterman on August 30, 1993, when the show moved to CBS. On January 31, 2012, 30 years after his first appearance with Letterman, Murray appeared again on his talk show. He appeared as Letterman's final guest when the host retired on May 20, 2015.

Murray began work on a film adaptation of W. Somerset Maugham's novel The Razor's Edge. The film, which Murray co-wrote, was his first starring role in a drama. He later agreed with Columbia Pictures to star in Ghostbusters—in a role originally written for John Belushi—to get financing for The Razor's Edge. Ghostbusters became the highest-grossing film of 1984 and, at the time, the highest-grossing comedy ever.

Disappointed over the failure of The Razor's Edge, Murray took a hiatus from acting for four years to study philosophy and history at Sorbonne University, frequent the Cinémathèque in Paris, and to spend time with his family in their Hudson River Valley home. During that time, his second son, Luke, was born. With the exception of a cameo in Little Shop of Horrors (1986), he made no film appearances, but participated in public readings in Manhattan organized by playwright-director Timothy Mayer and in a stage production of Bertolt Brecht's A Man's a Man. Murray returned to film with Scrooged (1988) and Ghostbusters II (1989).

Murray made his first and only attempt at directing when he co-directed Quick Change (1990) with producer Howard Franklin. He co-starred in Frank Oz's What About Bob? (1991) alongside Richard Dreyfuss. He starred in Harold Ramis's fantasy comedy Groundhog Day (1993). Hal Hinson of The Washington Post praised Murray's performance, writing: "Murray is a breed unto himself, a sort of gonzo minimalist. And he's never been funnier as a comedian or more in control as an actor than he is here. It's easily his best movie." That same year, he starred in the comedy Mad Dog and Glory alongside Robert De Niro and Uma Thurman. Vincent Canby of The New York Times wrote, "The great satisfaction of Mad Dog and Glory is watching Mr. De Niro and Mr. Murray play against type with such invigorating ease."

=== 1994–2009: Comedy stardom and mature roles ===
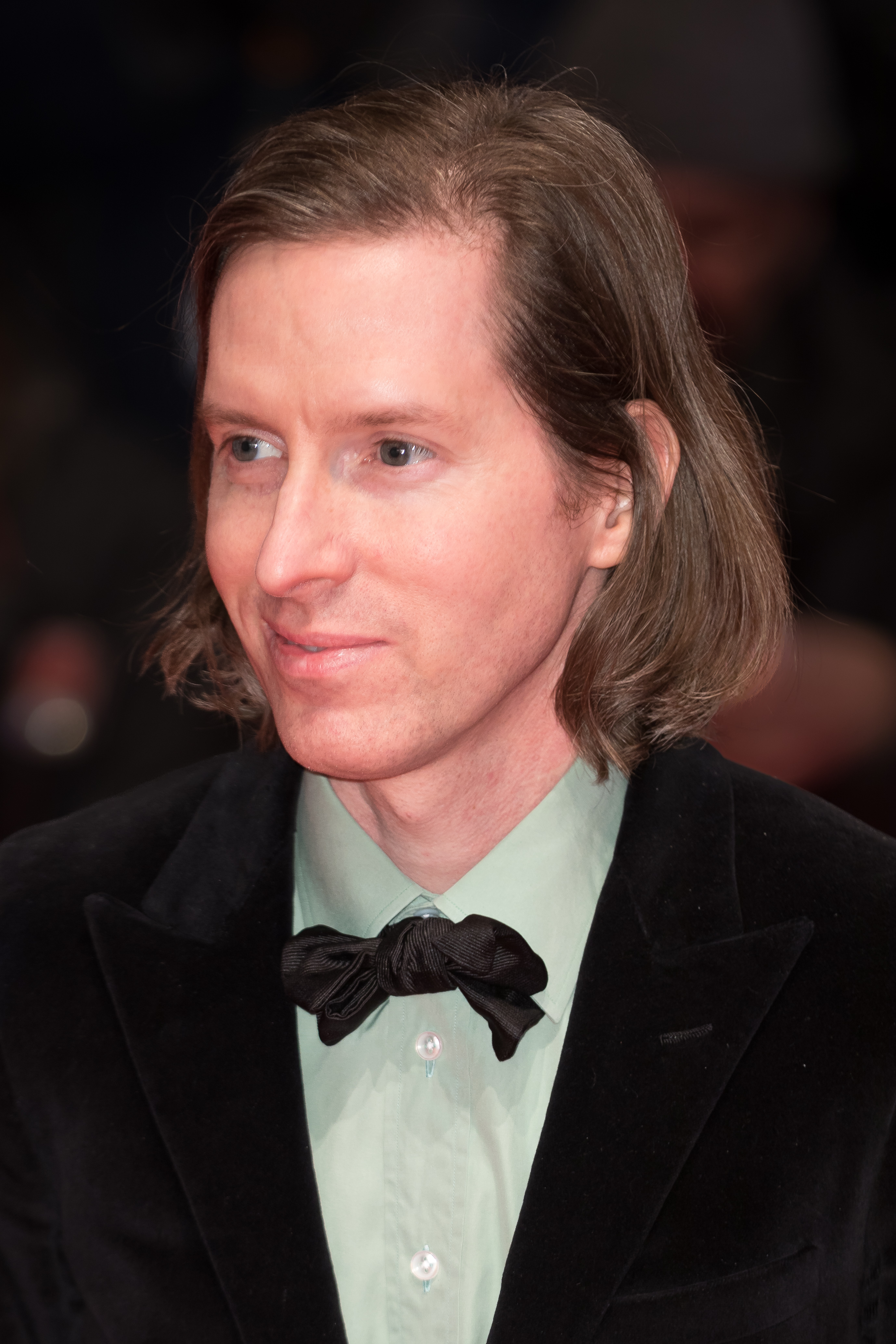
Murray has collaborated with Wes Anderson, acting in 10 of his films since 1998.

After the success of Groundhog Day, Murray appeared in a series of well-received supporting roles in films like Tim Burton's Ed Wood (1994) and Peter Farrelly's Kingpin (1996). Also in 1996, he appeared as himself in the Looney Tunes live action comedy Space Jam with Michael Jordan. However, his starring roles in Larger than Life (1996) and The Man Who Knew Too Little (1997) were not as successful with critics or audiences. He received much critical praise for his role in Wes Anderson's coming of age comedy Rushmore (1998), opposite Jason Schwartzman and Olivia Williams. Lisa Schwarzbaum of Entertainment Weekly wrote, "Murray turns in a thrillingly knowing, unforced performance — an award-worthy high point in a career that continues". Murray received the Best Supporting Actor awards from the New York Film Critics Circle, the National Society of Film Critics, and the Los Angeles Film Critics Association (tying with Billy Bob Thornton for A Simple Plan).

Murray then took on more dramatic roles in Wild Things (1998) and Cradle Will Rock (1999). Murray decided to take a turn towards more dramatic roles and experienced a resurgence in his career. In 2000, he portrayed Polonius in Michael Almereyda's Hamlet, based on the play by William Shakespeare. The film starred Ethan Hawke in the title role, as well as Kyle MacLachlan, Julia Stiles, Liev Schreiber and Sam Shepard. The film received mixed reviews. On May 22, 2000, he portrayed Luther Billis in a concert version of the stage musical South Pacific at Lincoln Center for a fundraiser. The following year, Murray reunited with Wes Anderson in the family comedy-drama The Royal Tenenbaums (2001) which starred Gene Hackman, Owen Wilson, Luke Wilson, Ben Stiller, Gwyneth Paltrow and Anjelica Huston. In the film, Murray plays Raleigh St. Clair, the meek and mild-mannered neurologist, writer, and husband of Margot Tenenbaum (Paltrow).

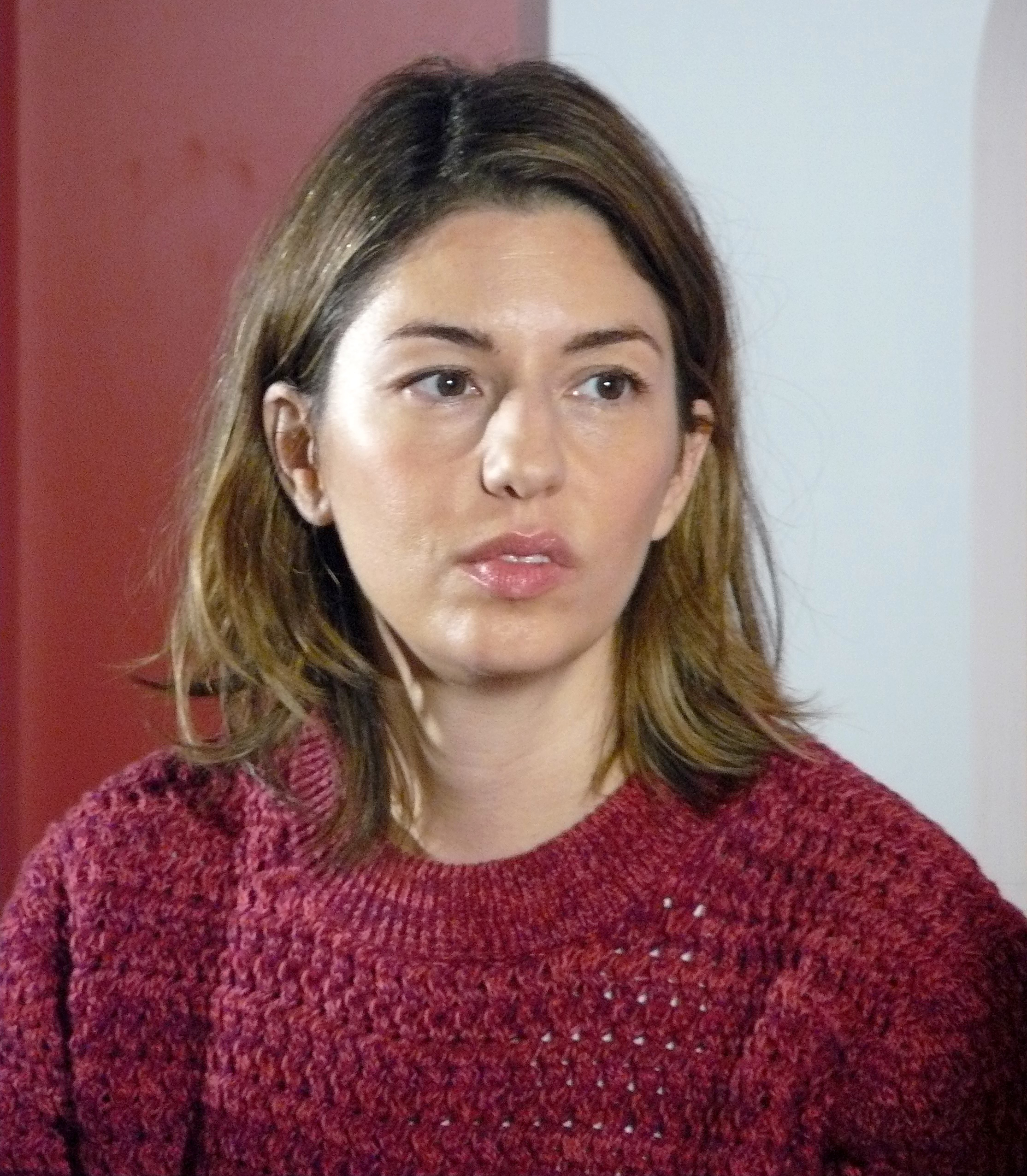
Murray acted in numerous Sofia Coppola films since 2003.

In 2003, he starred in his first collaboration with director Sofia Coppola in Lost in Translation opposite Scarlett Johansson. Murray plays an aging movie star on assignment in Tokyo to shoot a Suntory whiskey commercial. Feeling isolated and alone he meets an American woman, Charlotte (Johansson) with whom he sparks an unlikely friendship. Coppola explores the themes of alienation and disconnection against a backdrop of cultural displacement in Japan. The independent drama was an immense critical success and commercial success. Roger Ebert hailed Murray's performance: "Bill Murray has never been better. He doesn't play 'Bill Murray' or any other conventional idea of a movie star, but invents Bob Harris from the inside out, as a man both happy and sad with his life – stuck, but resigned to being stuck."

Murray earned numerous accolades, including the BAFTA Award for Best Actor in a Leading Role, the Golden Globe Award for Best Actor in a Motion Picture – Musical or Comedy, and the Independent Spirit Award for Best Male Lead, as well as Best Actor awards from several film critic organizations. He was considered a favorite to win the Academy Award for Best Actor, but Sean Penn ultimately won the award for his performance in Clint Eastwood's Mystic River. In an interview included on the Lost in Translation DVD, Murray states that it is his favorite film in which he has appeared. He played himself "hiding out" in a local coffee shop in Jim Jarmusch's anthology film Coffee and Cigarettes (2003). He voiced Garfield in Garfield: The Movie (2004), which role he reprised in Garfield: A Tail of Two Kitties (2006). Murray later said that he took the role only because he was under the mistaken impression that the screenplay, co-written by Joel Cohen, was the work of Joel Coen.

He made his third collaboration with Anderson in The Life Aquatic with Steve Zissou (2004), co-written by Anderson with Noah Baumbach. Murray plays Zissou, an oceanographer-filmmaker based on Jacques Cousteau who is struggling to finish his latest documentary and has to reconcile with his son (Owen Wilson). The film also stars Cate Blanchett, Willem Dafoe, Anjelica Huston, Jeff Goldblum and Michael Gambon. The film initially received mixed reviews, although Murray's performance was praised, and was a box office bomb. In the decades since, it has developed a cult following. The following year, Murray reunited with Jim Jarmusch in Broken Flowers (2005). The film revolves around Don Johnston (Murray), who embarks on a journey to four women (Sharon Stone, Frances Conroy, Jessica Lange and Tilda Swinton), to find out who sent him a mysterious letter. Roger Ebert praised Murray: "No actor is better than Bill Murray at doing nothing at all, and being fascinating while not doing it".

He returned to the big screen for cameos in Anderson's The Darjeeling Limited (2007) and Peter Segal's Get Smart (2008). He played an important role in the post-apocalyptic film City of Ember (2008). Murray starred in the independent film Get Low (2009) alongside Robert Duvall and Sissy Spacek. The film is loosely based on a true story about a Tennessee hermit in the 1930s who throws his own funeral party while still alive. Murray and Duvall received critical praise and the film won the Independent Spirit Award for Best First Feature. Also in 2009, Murray played himself in the zombie comedy Zombieland starring Woody Harrelson, Emma Stone and Jesse Eisenberg. Murray voiced Mr. Badger in Anderson's stop-motion film Fantastic Mr. Fox (2009).

=== 2010–2019 ===
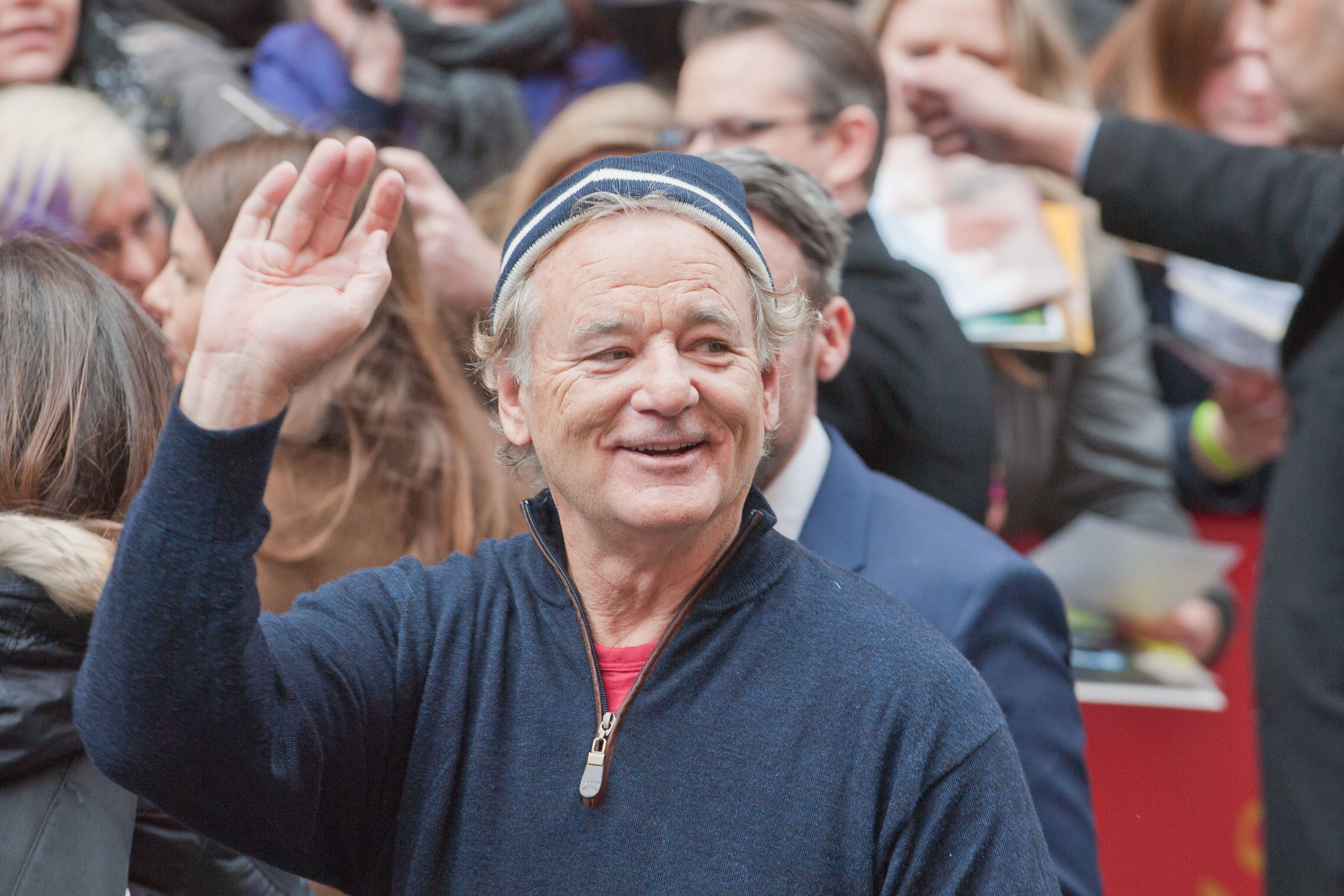
Murray at Berlinale in 2014.

Murray starred in Roger Michell's historical comedy Hyde Park on Hudson (2012), where he played Franklin D. Roosevelt opposite Laura Linney (Roosevelt's cousin Margaret Suckley) and Olivia Williams (Eleanor Roosevelt). The film focuses on the 1939 visit at the Roosevelts' Hyde Park home by King George VI and Queen Elizabeth (Samuel West and Olivia Colman, respectively.) Murray received praise from critics; Roger Ebert wrote, "Bill Murray wouldn't be my first thought for an actor to play President Franklin D. Roosevelt, but he may have been the right choice...The role requires him to show Roosevelt as a sometimes lonely and sad man whose vacation getaway is his mother's family mansion, Springwood, near Hyde Park in upstate New York ... Murray, who has a wider range than we sometimes realize, finds the human core of this FDR and presents it tenderly." Murray received a Golden Globe Award for Best Actor – Motion Picture Musical or Comedy nomination for his performance.

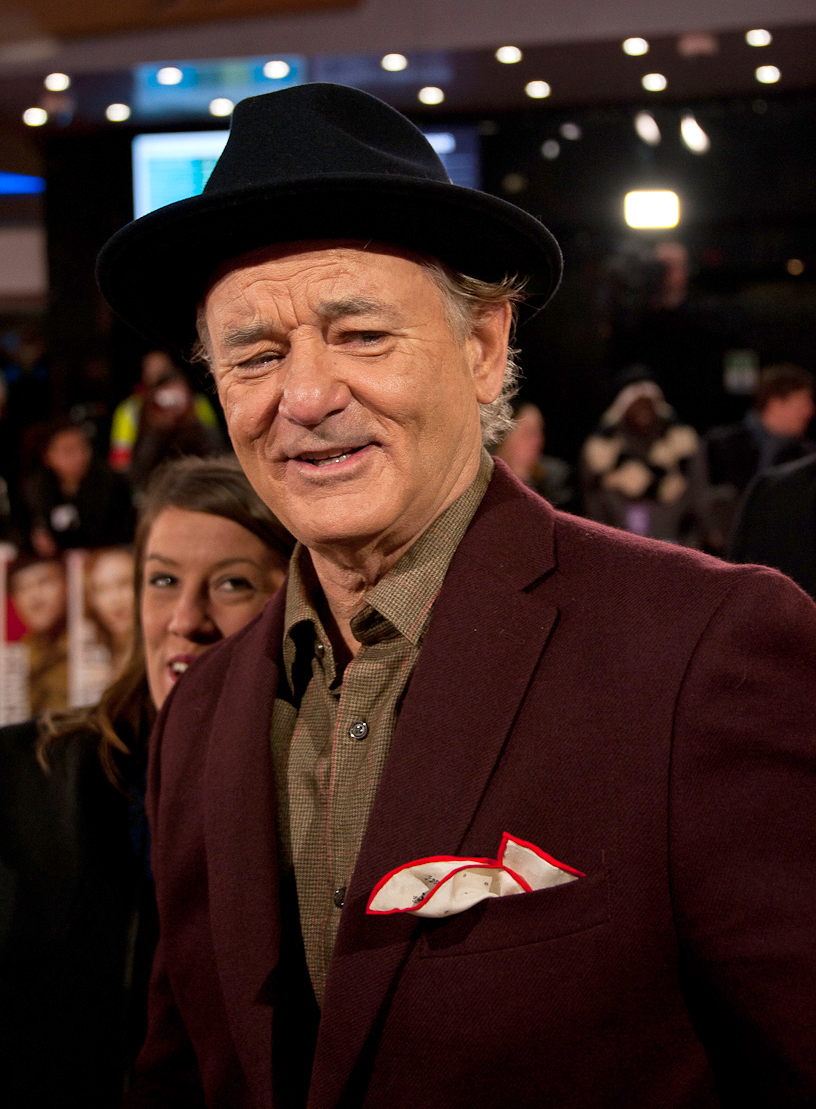
Murray at the premiere of The Monuments Men (2014)

Since 2010, Murray has continued to appear in Wes Anderson films, including the coming of age comedy Moonrise Kingdom (2012) which also starred Bruce Willis, Edward Norton, Frances McDormand and Tilda Swinton. The film premiered at the 65th Cannes Film Festival where it competed for the Palme d'Or. The film was a box office and critical success. In 2016, the BBC included the film in its list of greatest films of the twenty-first century. Murray made a brief comic turn in Anderson's The Grand Budapest Hotel (2014). The film competed at the 64th Berlin International Film Festival where it received rapturous reviews. The film received 9 Academy Award nominations including Best Picture, ultimately receiving 4, for Costume Design, Production Design, Makeup/Hair and Original Score. Murray, along with the cast, won the Actor Award for Outstanding Performance by a Cast in a Motion Picture for his ensemble work.

Murray, along with Matt Damon, Cate Blanchett, John Goodman, Hugh Bonneville, Jean Dujardin and Bob Balaban, starred in George Clooney's ensemble World War II drama The Monuments Men (2014). The film received mixed reviews from critics and was a modest box office success. Murray starred in the coming of age film St. Vincent (2014) alongside Melissa McCarthy and Naomi Watts. Murray played Vincent, a retired, grumpy, alcoholic Vietnam War veteran, and received a Golden Globe Award nomination for his performance. Peter Bradshaw's mixed review praised Murray: "[He] knows how to shine as the bleary, cynical companion to a younger person dragooned by fate into being both his pupil and his accomplice, and who puts Murray back in touch with his own innocence." He starred as a music manager in Barry Levinson's comedy film Rock the Kasbah (2015). Also that year, he starred in a Sofia Coppola-directed musical holiday special for Netflix called A Very Murray Christmas alongside Amy Poehler, Maya Rudolph, Chris Rock, Michael Cera, Rashida Jones, George Clooney, and Miley Cyrus. It was nominated for the Primetime Emmy Award for Outstanding Television Movie.

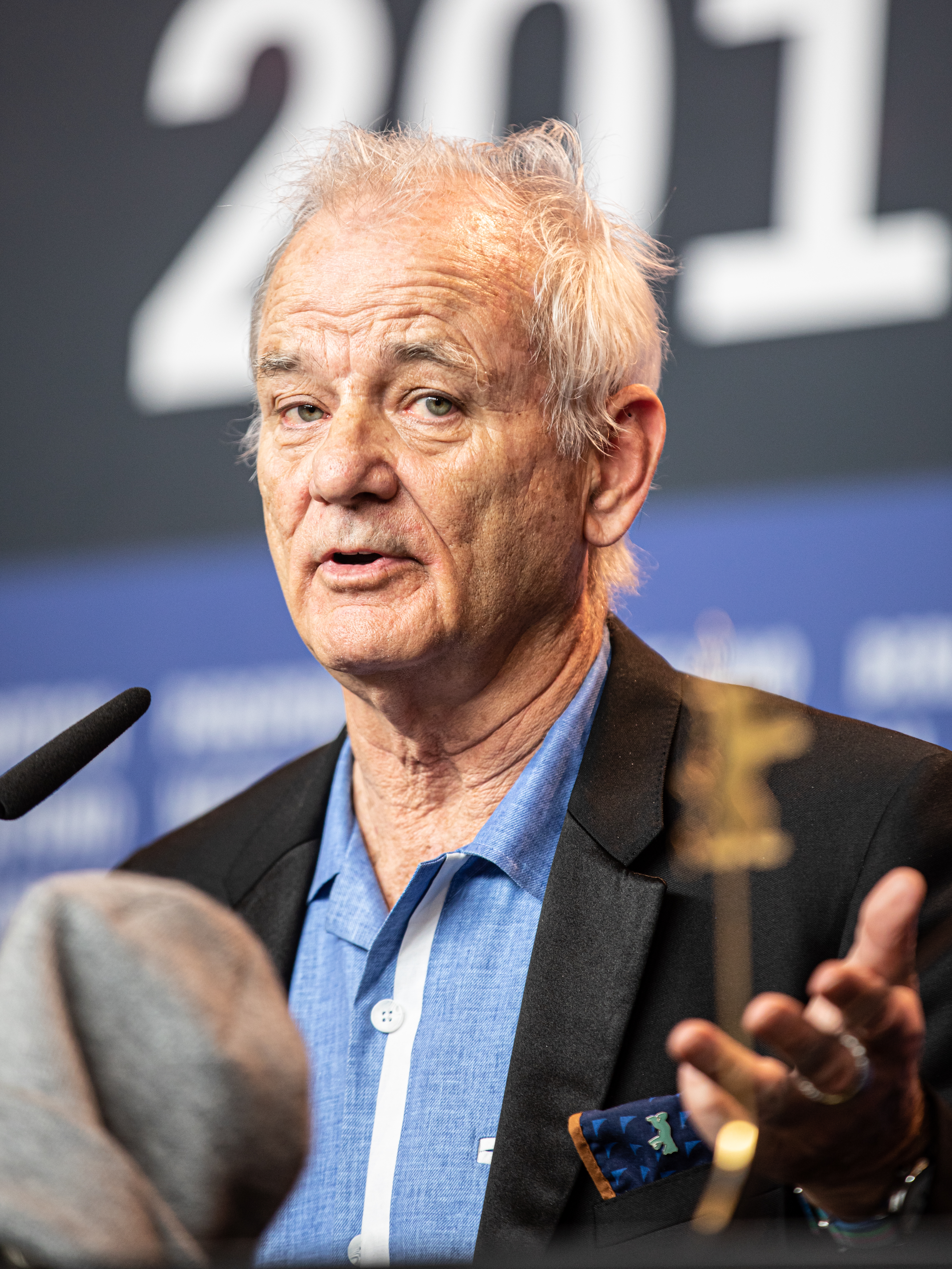
Murray at Berlinale in 2018.

He voiced Baloo in Jon Favreau's The Jungle Book (2016). Murray received praise for his comic performance with Chris Nashawaty of Entertainment Weekly describing him at "his wry, what-me-worry comic-relief best". The film was an immense financial hit, and earned a 95% approval rating on Rotten Tomatoes. Murray was nominated for Favorite Animated Movie Voice at the People's Choice Awards; he lost to Ellen DeGeneres who reprised her role in Finding Dory (2016). There had been speculation that Murray might return to the Ghostbusters franchise for a rumored Ghostbusters 3. Murray once stated, "I'd do it only if my character was killed off in the first reel," and also, "You know, maybe I should just do it. Maybe it'd be fun to do." Eventually, he appeared in both the 2016 Ghostbusters reboot as Martin Heiss, a cynical ghost debunker, which was released on July 15, 2016, and 2021's Ghostbusters: Afterlife.

In 2018, Murray returned to Saturday Night Live portraying Donald Trump's White House's Chief strategist Steve Bannon alongside Fred Armisen as journalist and author Michael Wolff. That year he was also part of Wes Anderson's ensemble cast of the animated film Isle of Dogs, which premiered at the 68th Berlin International Film Festival. He also briefly reprised his role as himself in Zombieland: Double Tap (2018). Murray was part of the ensemble cast of Jim Jarmusch's zombie-comedy The Dead Don't Die (2019) alongside Adam Driver, and Selena Gomez. The film received mixed reviews. However John Nungent of Empire praised its lead performances: "Murray and Driver are two of Jarmusch's favourite muses — the De Niro and DiCaprio to his Scorsese, if you like — and few actors capture that lackadaisical sense of humour quite as well as them, both faces almost Buster Keaton-esque in their deadpan resolve."

=== 2020–present ===
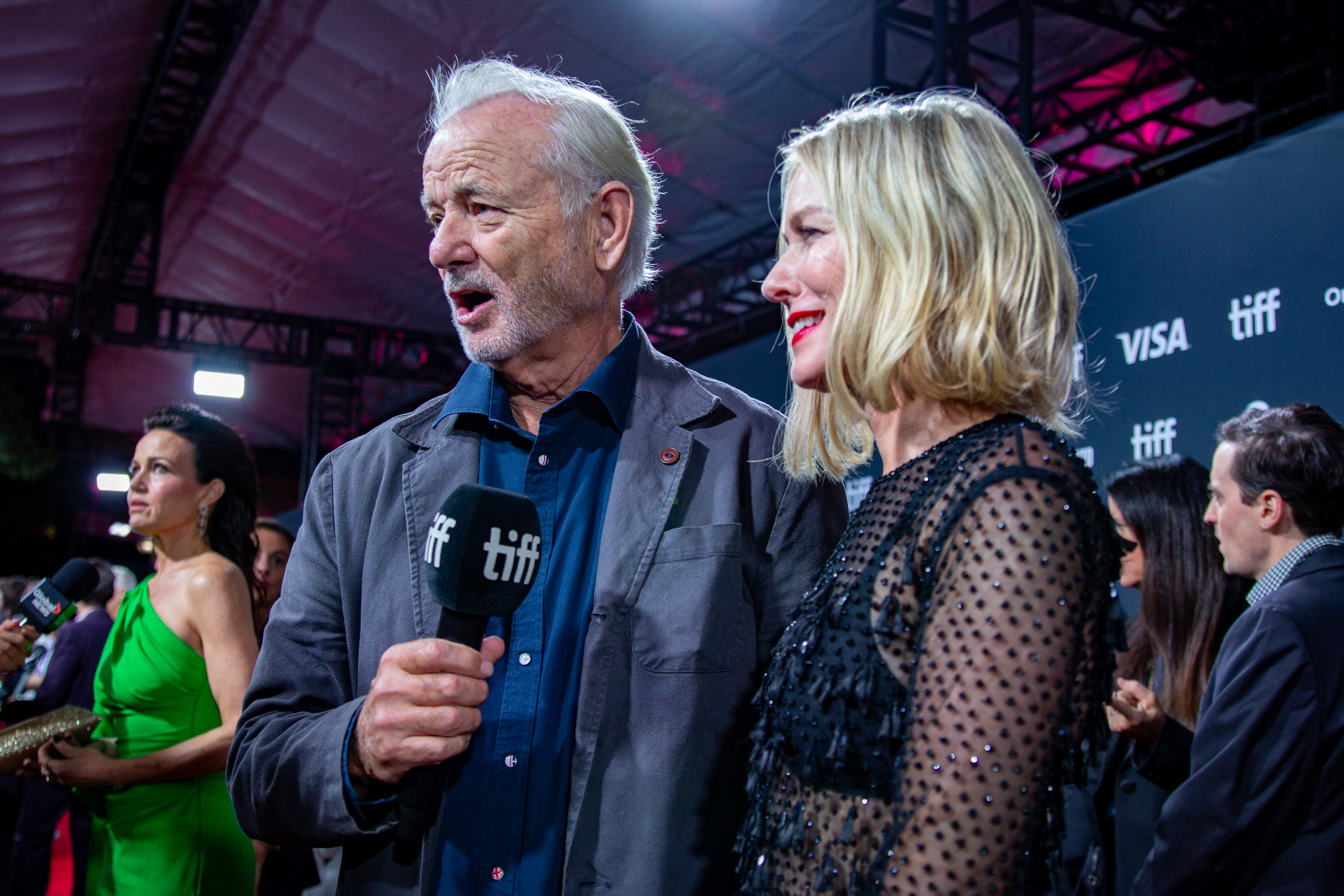
Murray and Naomi Watts at the Toronto International Film Festival in 2024.

Murray reprised his role in Groundhog Day for an ad which aired during the 2020 Super Bowl. In it, he steals the groundhog and drives him to various places in the orange Jeep Gladiator. Murray reunited with Sofia Coppola for the comedy-drama On the Rocks (2020) opposite Rashida Jones. The film premiered at the 58th New York Film Festival where it received positive reviews, with many critics praising Murray's performance. David Rooney of The Hollywood Reporter wrote that "Murray has seldom been better." It had a limited theatrical release on October 2, 2020, by A24, followed by a digital streaming release on October 23, 2020, on Apple TV+. He received some critical acclaim as well as nominations for the Golden Globe Award for Best Supporting Actor – Motion Picture and the Critics' Choice Movie Award for Best Supporting Actor.

Murray appeared in a small role in The French Dispatch (2021), reuniting him with Wes Anderson for the 9th time. It was set to premiere at the Cannes Film Festival on May 12, 2020, and get a wide release on July 24, but due to the COVID-19 pandemic, the festival was cancelled and the film was pulled from the schedule on April 3, 2020. The film was rescheduled for release on October 16, 2020, before being pulled from the schedule again on July 23, 2020. It ultimately premiered at the 2021 Cannes Film Festival and was released on October 22, 2021.

Murray reprised his role as Peter Venkman in Jason Reitman's Ghostbusters: Afterlife (2021). Fellow Ghostbusters cast members also reprised their roles including Dan Aykroyd, Ernie Hudson, Sigourney Weaver and Annie Potts. The film was a critical and commercial success. In October 2021, Murray joined the cast of the superhero film Ant-Man and the Wasp: Quantumania, set in the Marvel Cinematic Universe. He appeared in Peter Farrelly's biographical war comedy-drama film The Greatest Beer Run Ever (2022) alongside Zac Efron and Russell Crowe. It debuted at the 2022 Toronto International Film Festival where it received mixed reviews. It later debuted on Apple TV+. In 2024, he starred opposite Naomi Watts in the comedy The Friend which premiered at the Telluride Film Festival. In 2025, he reunited with Wes Anderson in a minor role in the comedy The Phoenician Scheme, his tenth collaboration with the director. Also in 2025, he returned to Saturday Night Live for their the 50th Anniversary Special where he ranked his favorite "Weekend Update" anchors.

== Other ventures ==
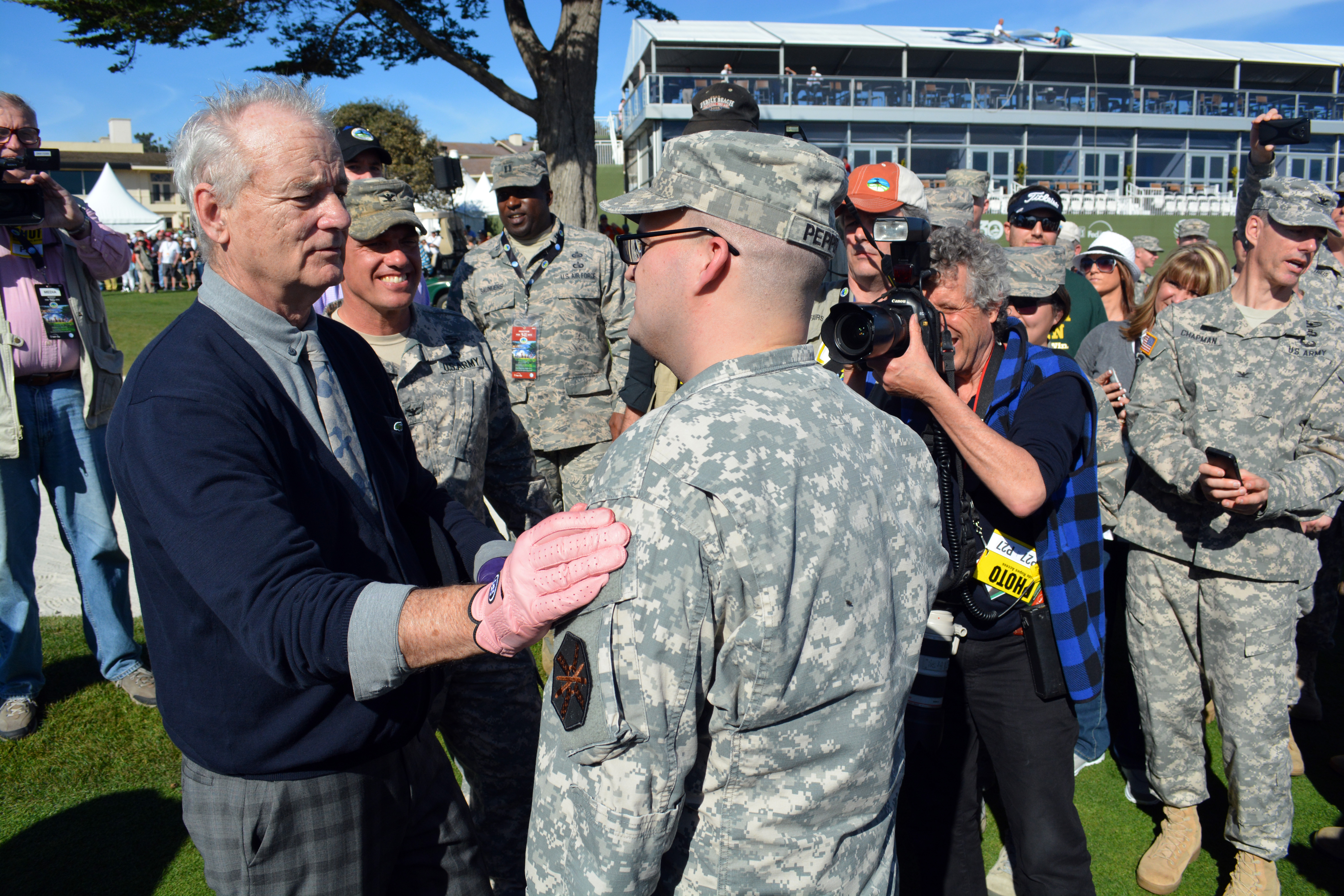
Bill Murray at Pebble Beach Pro Am

Murray is a partner with his brothers in Murray Bros. Caddy Shack, a restaurant with two locations. In 2001, they opened a location at the World Golf Village near St. Augustine, Florida. The second location opened in 2018, inside the Crowne Plaza Rosemont Hotel near the O'Hare International Airport. In 1978, Murray appeared in two at-bats for the Grays Harbor Loggers Minor League Baseball team, credited with one hit and a lifetime batting average of .500.

He founded and was part-owner of the St. Paul Saints, a Minor League Baseball team of the International League and the Triple-A affiliate of the Minnesota Twins. Bill occasionally traveled to Saint Paul, Minnesota to watch the team's games. Murray sold his interest in the Saints in 2023. As part of the Goldklang Group, he owns or owned part of the Charleston RiverDogs, the Hudson Valley Renegades, and the Brockton Rox. He has invested in a number of other minor league teams in the past, including the Utica Blue Sox, the Fort Myers Miracle, the Salt Lake Sting (APSL), the Catskill Cougars, and the Salt Lake City Trappers. In 2012, he was inducted into the South Atlantic League Hall of Fame for his ownership and investment activities in the league.

On his birthday in 2016, Murray, along with his brother Joel, launched an apparel brand called William Murray Golf. In 2017, Murray recorded a studio album entitled New Worlds featuring singing and literary recitations with classical musicians. The album was released on vinyl, CD and digital through Verve Records. In 2022, Murray recited poetry and sang with the cellist Jan Vogler, in a recorded production of New Worlds: The Cradle of Civilization, which was released in cinemas.

== Public image ==
Murray's popularity has been such that he holds an iconic status in American popular culture. Murray's eccentric style of comedy, both on-screen and in his personal life, has caused him to be seen as a folk hero to many making him a significant meme in various media including books and the Internet. In 2016 he was awarded the Mark Twain Prize for American Humor by the Kennedy Center. Roger Ebert writes that "The Murray persona has become familiar without becoming tiring: The world is too much with him, he is a little smarter than everyone else, he has a detached melancholy, he is deeply suspicious of joy, he sees sincerity as a weapon that can be used against him, and yet he conceals emotional needs. He is Hamlet in a sitcom world." While declaring him an ideal Beckettian actor, perfectly suited for Waiting for Godot, theatre scholar Octavian Saiu—who hosted a special dialogue with Murray and Peter Bradshaw in 2025—spoke about Murray's incredible ability to not only make people around him look good, but to "bring out the light in them".

== Personal life ==
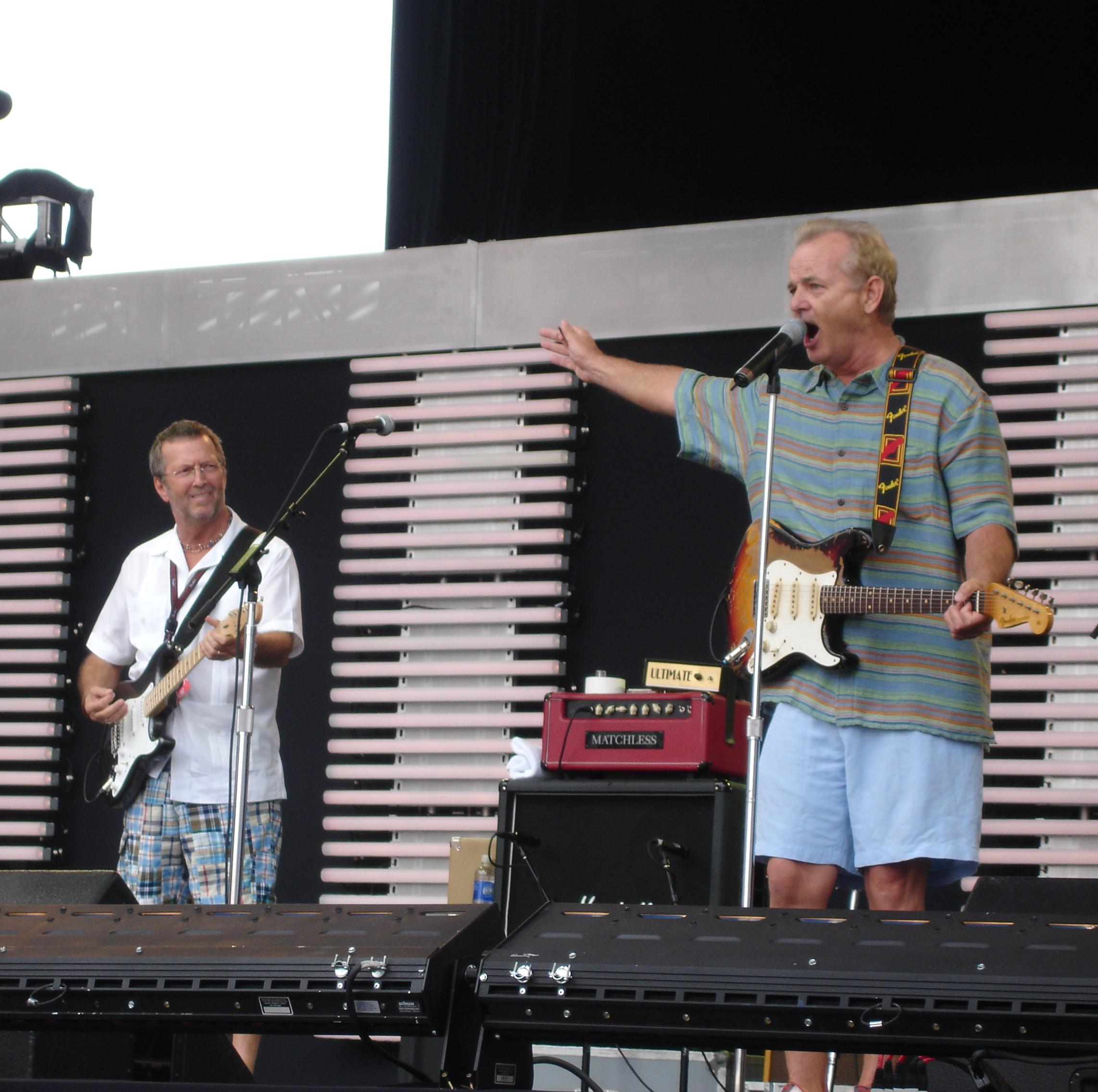
Eric Clapton and Murray kicking off the Crossroads Guitar Festival in 2007

Being very detached from the Hollywood scene, Murray does not have an agent or manager and reportedly fields offers for scripts and roles by using a personal telephone number with a voice mailbox that he checks infrequently. This practice has reportedly prevented him from participating in films such as Who Framed Roger Rabbit; Monsters, Inc.; The Squid and the Whale; Charlie and the Chocolate Factory; and Little Miss Sunshine. When asked about this practice in 2011, Murray said "It's not that hard. If you have a good script, that's what gets you involved. People say they can't find me. Well, if you can write a good script, that's a lot harder than finding someone. I don't worry about it; it's not my problem."

Murray primarily resides in Sullivan's Island, South Carolina, near Charleston. He also has homes in Los Angeles; Rancho Santa Fe, California; and Martha's Vineyard, Massachusetts. He had a house in Palisades, New York, until 2024. Between 2008 and 2013, Murray maintained a residence in the Greenwich Village neighborhood of New York City.

In 2007, Murray was pulled over by Swedish police on suspicion of driving a golf cart under the influence of alcohol.

Murray has experienced symptoms of depression. He has said that art and music have helped ease depressive episodes.

He is a student of the teachings of George Gurdjieff.

Murray is the godfather to Wes Anderson's daughter.

=== Marriages and children ===
During the filming of Stripes, Murray married Margaret Kelly on January 25, 1981. Later, they remarried in Chicago for their families. Margaret gave birth to two sons, including Luke Murray. Following Murray's affair with Jennifer Butler, the couple divorced in 1996.

In 1997, Murray married Butler. Together, they have four sons. Butler filed for divorce in May 2008, accusing Murray of domestic violence, infidelity, and addictions to sex, marijuana, and alcohol. Their divorce was finalized on June 13, 2008.

Butler died on January 19, 2021.

=== Chicago sports and other activities ===
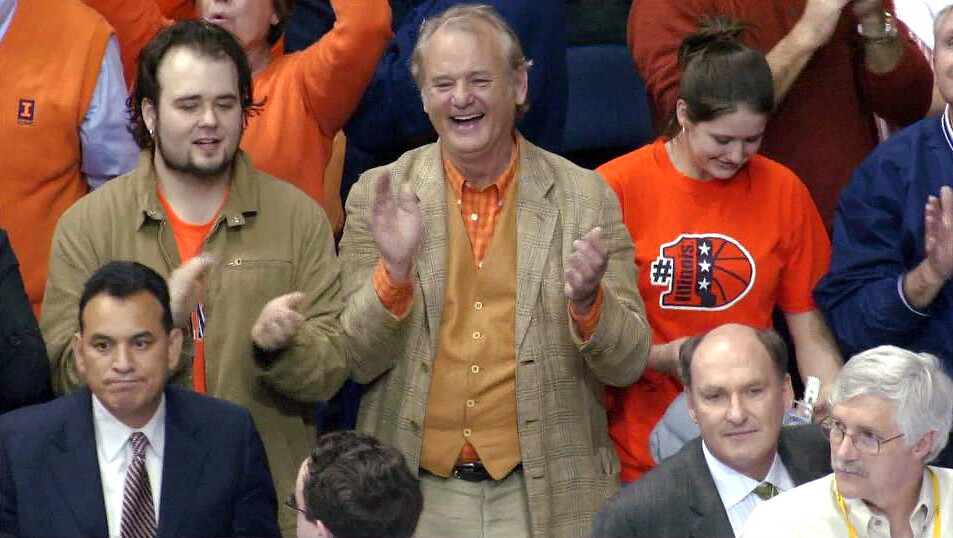
Murray cheering for the University of Illinois Urbana-Champaign's 2004–2005 regional final basketball game at the 2005 Final Four in St. Louis

Murray is a fan of the Chicago Cubs, Chicago Bears, and Chicago Bulls professional sports teams. He is a fixture at home games of those teams when in his native Chicago. He was a guest color commentator for the Cubs' April 17, 1987 game against the Montreal Expos. In 2004, Murray appeared in former Cubs player Ron Santo's documentary, This Old Cub. In 2006, Murray received Baseball Reliquary's annual Hilda Award "to recognize distinguished service to the game by a fan". In September 2007, he traveled to Florida during the Cubs' playoff run to help "inspire" the team (Murray joked with Cubs slugger Aramis Ramírez he was very ill and needed two home runs to give him the hope to live). During the 2016 World Series in which the Cubs were playing, he led the crowd in singing "Take Me Out to the Ballgame" at Wrigley Field, and he was in attendance, along with fellow Cubs fans John Cusack, Eddie Vedder, and Bonnie Hunt, during the Cubs' historic Game Seven victory.

During Luke's 2021–2026 tenure as an assistant coach for the University of Connecticut Huskies men's basketball team, Murray attended several of their games, including during their championship run in the 2023 NCAA Division I men's basketball tournament. As of March 2026, Luke is head coach of the Boston College Eagles men's basketball team.

As a Chicago native, Murray appeared at the 50th annual Chicago Air & Water Show in August 2008. He performed a tandem jump with the U.S. Army Parachute Team Golden Knights.

=== Feuds and misconduct allegation ===
Murray has been known for his mood swings, leading Dan Aykroyd to refer to him as "The Murricane". Murray has said "a friend said to me: 'You have a reputation of being difficult to work with.' But I only got that reputation from people I didn't like working with, or people who didn't know how to work, or what work is. Jim, Wes and Sofia, they know what it is to work."

In the book Live from New York: An Uncensored History of Saturday Night Live, Chevy Chase recalls being confronted by Murray shortly before a broadcast in 1978, in which Chase had returned to guest host. Murray later said of the incident, "It was an Oedipal thing, a rupture. Because we all felt mad he had left us, and somehow I was the anointed avenging angel, who had to speak for everyone. But Chevy and I are friends now. It's all fine." The two went on to star together in Caddyshack, which was shot the following year.

Over his career, Murray has gotten into combative disagreements and feuds with several actors including Sean Young, Nick Nolte, Seth Green, Rob Schneider, Geena Davis, Lucy Liu, Anjelica Huston, Richard Dreyfuss, as well as with film director McG, and producer Laura Ziskin.

Murray has said that he and film director Richard Donner did not get along well while filming Scrooged. Donner said of Murray: "He's superbly creative, but occasionally difficult – as difficult as any actor."

Murray had a falling out with film director and longtime collaborator Harold Ramis during the production of Groundhog Day. According to screenwriter Danny Rubin, "They were like two brothers who weren't getting along." They had creative differences which ultimately ended their fruitful film collaboration in 1993. Murray eventually reconciled with Ramis just before his death in February 2014 and honored him at the 86th Academy Awards.

According to co-star Jay Mohr, Murray assaulted a producer on the set of Speaking of Sex (2001) when Murray made a last minute request to have his birthday off and the producer said he would try to make it happen.

Lost in Translation director Sofia Coppola said that Scarlett Johansson and Murray did not get along during filming. Despite this, Johansson stated that he was a lot of fun to work with on the production; Johansson elaborated saying that Murray was in a "hard place" and that they have since reconciled."

In April 2022, production of Being Mortal was suspended after Murray was accused of unspecified "inappropriate behavior". His female accuser received a private settlement of $100,000. In 2025, Murray said, "I was wearing a mask, and I gave her a kiss, and she was wearing a mask [...] [It was] something that I had done to someone else before. I thought it was funny, and every time it happened, it was funny [...] [I don't] go too many days or weeks without thinking of what happened". Murray has been defended by longtime collaborator Wes Anderson amid the misconduct claims. Johansson said that she felt Murray's experiences during COVID-19 and the misconduct allegation have both "changed" and "humbled him" and that they "have led up to him being held accountable for that kind of behavior".

According to Seth Green, Murray forcibly dropped him in a trash bin backstage on Saturday Night Live when he was nine years old. He claimed that the assault occurred after Murray was frustrated that Green refused to move from the armrest of a couch.

=== Religious beliefs ===
Murray stated in a 1984 interview: "I'm definitely a religious person, but it doesn't have much to do with Catholicism anymore. I don't think about Catholicism as much."

In a 2014 interview, Murray expressed affection for the Traditional Latin Mass and expressed concerns about some of the changes within the Mass of Paul VI: "I'm not sure all those changes were right. I tend to disagree with what they call the new Mass. I think we lost something by losing the Latin. Now if you go to a Catholic Mass even just in Harlem it can be in Spanish, it can be in Ethiopian, it can be in any number of languages. The shape of it, the pictures, are the same but the words aren't the same."

=== Political views ===
Murray donated $1,000 to former governor of Nebraska Bob Kerrey's successful election to the United States Senate in 1988.

During the 2000 presidential campaign, Murray supported Green Party candidate Ralph Nader.

In a 2018 interview, Murray sarcastically praised the Trump tax cuts, opining them to be a "great thing for the corporations".

== Filmography ==
=== Film ===
Year	Title	Role	Notes
1976	Next Stop, Greenwich Village	Nick Kessel	Uncredited
1979	Meatballs	Tripper Harrison	
1979	Mr. Mike's Mondo Video	Man on the Street	
1979	Tarzoon: Shame of the Jungle	Reporter	Voice; English dub
1980	Where the Buffalo Roam	Hunter S. Thompson	
1980	Caddyshack	Carl Spackler	
1980	Loose Shoes	Lefty Schwartz	
1981	Stripes	Pvt. John Winger	
1982	Tootsie	Jeff Slater	
1984	Ghostbusters	Dr. Peter Venkman	
1984	Nothing Lasts Forever	Ted Breughel	
1984	B.C. Rock	The Dragon	Uncredited voice (English dub)
1984	The Razor's Edge	Larry Darrell	Also writer
1986	Little Shop of Horrors	Arthur Denton	
1988	She's Having a Baby	Himself	Uncredited cameo
1988	Scrooged	Francis Xavier "Frank" Cross	
1989	Ghostbusters II	Dr. Peter Venkman	
1990	Quick Change	Grimm	Also co-director and producer
1991	What About Bob?	Bob Wiley	
1993	Groundhog Day	Phil Connors	
1993	Mad Dog and Glory	Frank Milo	
1994	Ed Wood	Bunny Breckinridge	
1996	Kingpin	Ernie McCracken	
1996	Larger than Life	Jack Corcoran	
1996	Space Jam	Himself	
1997	The Man Who Knew Too Little	Wallace Ritchie	
1998	Wild Things	Kenneth Bowden	
1998	With Friends Like These...	Maurice Melnick	Cameo
1998	Rushmore	Herman Blume	
1999	Cradle Will Rock	Tommy Crickshaw	
2000	Charlie's Angels	John Bosley	
2000	Michael Jordan to the Max	Himself	Documentary
2000	Hamlet	Polonius	
2001	Osmosis Jones	Frank Detorre	
2001	Speaking of Sex	Ezri Stovall	
2001	The Royal Tenenbaums	Raleigh St. Clair	
2003	Lost in Translation	Bob Harris	
2003	Coffee and Cigarettes	Himself/Waiter	Segment: "Delirium"
2004	Garfield: The Movie	Garfield	Voice
2004	The Life Aquatic with Steve Zissou	Steve Zissou	
2005	Broken Flowers	Don Johnston	
2005	The Lost City	The Writer	
2006	Garfield: A Tail of Two Kitties	Garfield	Voice
2007	The Darjeeling Limited	The Businessman	Cameo
2008	Get Smart	Agent 13	Cameo
2008	City of Ember	Mayor Cole	
2009	The Limits of Control	American	
2009	Fantastic Mr. Fox	Clive Badger	Voice
2009	Zombieland	Himself	Cameo
2010	Get Low	Frank Quinn	
2011	Passion Play	Happy Shannon	
2012	Moonrise Kingdom	Mr. Bishop	
2012	A Glimpse Inside the Mind of Charles Swan III	Saul	
2012	Hyde Park on Hudson	Franklin D. Roosevelt	
2014	The Monuments Men	Sergeant Richard Campbell	
2014	The Grand Budapest Hotel	M. Ivan	
2014	St. Vincent	Vincent MacKenna	
2014	Dumb and Dumber To	Ice Pick	Cameo
2015	Aloha	Carson Welch	
2015	Rock the Kasbah	Richie Lanz	
2016	The Jungle Book	Baloo	Voice
2016	Ghostbusters	Martin Heiss	
2018	Isle of Dogs	Boss	Voice
2018	For the Fun of the Game	Himself	Documentary
2018	The Bill Murray Stories: Life Lessons Learned from a Mythical Man	Himself	Archival footage; documentary
2019	The Dead Don't Die	Cliff Robertson	
2019	Zombieland: Double Tap	Himself	Cameo
2020	On the Rocks	Felix Keane	
2021	The French Dispatch	Arthur Howitzer Jr.	Cameo
2021	Ghostbusters: Afterlife	Dr. Peter Venkman	Cameo
2022	The Greatest Beer Run Ever	The Colonel	
2022	Being Mortal	Dying protagonist	Filmed but abandoned (Note: filmed after investigating a complaint filed against Murray for "inappropriate behavior")
2023	Ant-Man and the Wasp: Quantumania	Lord Krylar	
2024	Ghostbusters: Frozen Empire	Dr. Peter Venkman	
2024	The Friend	Walter	
2024	Riff Raff	Leftie	
2025	The Phoenician Scheme	God	Cameo
2025	John Candy: I Like Me	Himself	Documentary
2026	Diamond	Jimbo	

=== Television ===
Year	Title	Role	Notes
1975	Saturday Night Live with Howard Cosell	Various roles	Also writer
1977–80	Saturday Night Live	Various roles	72 episodes; also writer
1978	All You Need Is Cash	Bill Murray the K	Television film
1981–2018	Saturday Night Live	Himself	5 episodes as host, 6 episodes as guest actor
1982	The Rodney Dangerfield Show: It's Not Easy Bein' Me	Various roles	TV special
1982	Second City Television	Various roles	Episode: "The Days of the Week/Street Beef"
1983	Square Pegs	Teacher	Episode: "No Substitutions"
2002	The Sweet Spot	Himself	6 episodes
2013–14	Alpha House	Senator Vernon Smits	3 episodes
2014	Olive Kitteridge	Jack Kennison	2 episodes
2015	Parks and Recreation	Mayor Gunderson	Episode: "Two Funerals"
2015	A Very Murray Christmas	Himself	Television special; Also writer and executive producer
2016	Angie Tribeca	Vic Deakins	Episode: "Tribeca's Day Off"
2016	Vice Principals	Principal Welles	Episode: "The Principal"
2016	17th Mark Twain Prize for American Humor	Himself (honoree)	Television special
2017–18	Bill Murray & Brian Doyle-Murray's Extra Innings	Himself (co-host)	10 episodes
2021	The Now	Dr. Robert Flaherty	5 episodes
2026	A Course Called Ireland	Himself	6 episodes

=== Video games ===
Year	Title	Role	Notes
2009	Ghostbusters: The Video Game	Dr. Peter Venkman	
2015	Lego Dimensions	Dr. Peter Venkman	
2019	Ghostbusters: The Video Game Remastered	Dr. Peter Venkman	

=== Radio ===
Year	Title	Voice role
1973–1974	The National Lampoon Radio Hour	Various roles
1975	Fantastic Four	Human Torch / Johnny Storm

=== Music videos ===
Year	Title	Artist(s)	Role
2024	"Santa Baby"	Laufey	Himself

== Awards and nominations ==
Murray has received a BAFTA Award, a Golden Globe Award, two Primetime Emmy Awards, and two Independent Spirit Awards. He was nominated for the Academy Award for Best Actor for his performance in Sofia Coppola's romance Lost in Translation (2003). In 2015, Murray was inducted into the Caddie Hall of Fame. He and fellow actor Martin Sheen were inducted into the Irish-American Hall of Fame in 2017.

== See also ==
- The Bill Murray Stories: Life Lessons Learned from a Mythical Man, a film about several urban legends surrounding Bill Murray.
- List of actors with Academy Award nominations
- List of Golden Globe winners
- List of Primetime Emmy Award winners

Media offices
Preceded by Jane Curtin and Dan Aykroyd	Weekend Update anchor (with Jane Curtin); 1978–1980	Succeeded by Charles Rocket
