= Carolus Wrede =

Finnish industrialist

Baron Carl Gustaf Garibaldi Fabian Wrede af Elimä
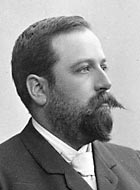
- Born: 27 December 1860; Kaarina, Grand Duchy of Finland
- Died: 15 May 1927 (aged 66); Helsinki, Finland
- Occupation: industrialist
- Board member of: Åbo Jernmanufaktur Ab (1906–1920); Mutual Insurance Company Sampo (1907–1915; 1918–1922); Turku Employers' Association (1907–1927); Ab Crichton (1916–1922); Oy Lehtoniemi Ab (from 1917)
- Spouse: Siri Maria née Söderhjelm
- Children: Rabbe Wilhelm (1887–1938); Gustaf Woldemar (1889–1958); Carl Fabian (1891–1925); Henrik Johan (1893–1893); Siri Johanna, married Wahlforss (1894–1984); Gerd Henrik (1896–1966); Kenneth Alexander (1898–1983)
- Parent(s): Wilhelm Otto Casper David Wrede af Elimä and Hedvig Johanna Wilhelmina Gustava née Armfelt

Manager of Åbo Jernmanufaktur Ab
- In office 1906–1918

Manager of Åbo Waggonfabrik C. Wrede & C:o
- In office 1906–1918

Manager of Ab Crichton
- In office 1922–1924

Manager of Mutual Insurance Company Sampo
- In office 1922–1924

Baron Carl Gustaf Garibaldi Fabian "Carolus" Wrede af Elimä (27 December 1860 – 15 May 1927) was a Finnish industrialist.

Wrede studied five grades in Turku and in 1881 started his career at Hackman & Co. in Viipuri. After a short entrepreneurship period in 1884–1887 he returned to the company to lead Sorsakoski sawmill in Leppävirta. During Wrede's leadership the portfolio moved from timber to cutlery.

In 1902 Wrede bought Lehtoniemi Shipyard.

Wrede moved to Turku in 1906 and became manager of Åbo Jernmanufaktur and Åbo Waggonfabrik. In 1922–1924 he managed shipbuilder Ab Crichton and insurance company Sampo.

== Early years ==
Wrede was born in Kaarina, close to Turku in a large family as one of the youngest children. His parents were major, Baron Wilhelm Otto Casper David Wrede af Elimä and countess Hedvig Johanna Wilhelmina Gustava née Armfelt. He was a member of the Finnish-Swede Wrede family. Carolus was still young when his father died. He studied five grades in Swedish-speaking classical school in Turku in 1873–1880.

== Career ==
=== Hackman & Co. ===
In 1881 Wrede went to work for Hackman & Co. in Viipuri. Wrede started his own business in 1884 when he founded a galvanisation plant in Viipuri. After three years he sold the plant to Seth Sohlberg.

Wrede moved back to Hackman & Co. to manage Sorsakoski sawmill. He criticised the machinery and facilities, which he regarded outdated. He wanted the company to build a bobbin factory and a groundwood mill; however, the Hackman family was not willing to make such large-scale investments. The sawmill production capacity grew significantly in 1891 after costly renewal of machinery. Raw material availability was ensured by buying forests in Savonia.

In 1891 Hackman & Co. decided to close down its Nurmi forgery which produced knives, scissors and skates. The production was moved temporarily to Sorsakoski, to complete the unfinished work of the forge. But the high demand of the products motivated Wrede to develop the production. Skate-making was restarted and demand of puukkos increased year by year; during the seven first months of 1896 the company sold over 30 000 puukkos. The company recruited an agent to represent its products in Saint Petersburg. In 1897 the value of the forgery was listed 100 000 marks and sawmill 300 000 marks. The sawmill was destroyed in fire in the following year. The forgery shop took the place as the main production site; it was developed during the subsequent years. In year 1900 the plant made profit by 80 000 marks.

=== Lehtoniemi ===
In 1902 Wrede left Hackman & Co. after buying premises of previously bankrupted Lehtoniemi company located in Joroinen. The facilities comprised shipyard, engineering works, hydropower plant, sawmill and flour mill.

=== Åbo Jernmanufaktur and Åbo Waggonfabrik ===
In 1906 Wrede became manager of Turku-based Åbo Jernmanufaktur Ab, from which he split Kaarina-located wagon producer into another company Åbo Waggonfabrik Ab. Both companies developed rapidly. Wrede moved to Turku and soon became one of the most influential industrialists of the city; he became Board Chairman of Mutual Insurance Company Sampo in 1907 and in the following year he became selected to the city council.

=== Recession ===
After World War I Åbo Jernmanufaktur fell into financial trouble; subsequently, the main creditor Union Bank of Finland took control on the company. Wrede appointed his son-in-law, young engineer Wilhelm Wahlforss to manage the factory. Also Lehtoniemi works faced problems. Wrede sold most of the shares to Saint Petersburg businessman Harald Lundsten and Emissions Ab, after which he owned one third of the company. In 1921 Wrede appointed Wahlforss to manage the company. His period was successful; he managed to raise the company from one million marks' loss experienced in 1920–1921 up to 150 000 marks' profit received in the following financial year. Wahlforss led the company until 1925.

Wrede became Board Chairman of Turku shipbuilder Ab Crichton in 1916 and in 1922 he became company manager. In the same year he became also manager of Sampo. He retired from both positions in 1924 after which he moved to Helsinki. He died in 1927.

== Family and private life ==
Wrede married Siri Maria Söderhjelm in 1886. The couple had six sons and one daughter in 1887–1898; five of sons survived to adult age. The daughter, 1894-born Siri Johanna, married Wilhelm Wahlforss, the developer of Wärtsilä company. Also 1889-born son Gustaf Wrede became a significant business leader.

While Wrede was a moderniser as a business leader, he is characterised as an arch-conservative patriarch in his private life.
