= Anna Godenius =

Swedish actress

- Born: 24 July 1944 (age 81); Köping, Sweden
- Occupation: Actress
- Years active: 1975–present

Anna Godenius (born 24 July 1944) is a Swedish actress. She is best known for her lead roles in the 1977 miniseries Honest Blue Eyes and 1978 film Men Can't Be Raped.

== Biography ==
She was born 24 July 1944 in Köping. She graduated from the State School of Drama in Malmö in 1972.

Her breakthrough was in the 1977 miniseries Honest Blue Eyes. She played a femme fetale who used charm and disguises to obtain money from men of dubious or objectionable character. The series was a success.

In 1978, she played the lead role in Men Can't Be Raped, a rape and revenge film adapted from Märta Tikkanen's novel Manrape. Godenius played the lead role of Eva, a librarian who takes revenge on her rapist. Although the film spurred debate, her performance was praised.

In addition to her acting work, she has also worked as an audiobook narrator for the Swedish Agency for Accessible Media. She has also worked as a narrator for Sveriges Radio.

== Selected filmography ==
- Egg! Egg! A Hardboiled Story (1975)
- A Guy and a Gal (1975)
- Honest Blue Eyes (1977)
- Men Can't Be Raped (1978)
- Svart Lucia (1992)
- Stockholm East (2011)
