= Lehtoniemi (company) =

Oy Lehtoniemi Ab
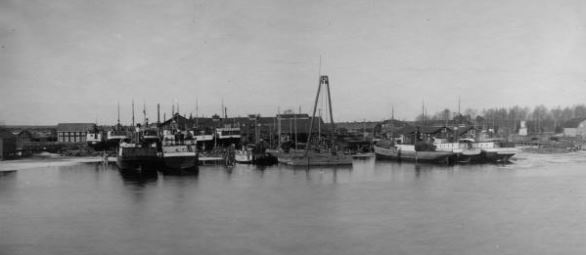
- Formerly: Tehtaat Lehtoniemi & Taipale Fabriker
- Company type: osakeyhtiö
- Industry: shipbuilding; engineering
- Predecessor: Tehtaat Lehtoniemi & Taipale Fabriker
- Founded: 15 September 1902; 123 years ago in Joroinen, Grand Duchy of Finland
- Founder: Carolus Wrede
- Defunct: 1929
- Fate: bankruptcy
- Successor: A. Ahlström Oy Ääniteknillinen Tehdas
- Headquarters: Lehtoniemi, Joroinen, Grand Duchy of Finland (→1917); Finland (1917→)
- Products: steam ships, steam boilers, pumps, winches
- Revenue: 4.9 million marks (1923)
- Owners: Carolus Wrede; Emissioni Oy; Liittopankki; Kansallis-Osake-Pankki; Wilhelm Wahlforss
- Number of employees: 146 (1923)

Oy Lehtoniemi Ab was a Finnish engineering and shipbuilding company, which operated in 1902–1930. The yard was located in Lehtoniemi, Joroinen in Mikkeli Province at lake Saimaa.

The company was founded by Carolus Wrede to continue operations of the previously bankrupted Tehtaat Lehtoniemi & Taipale Fabriker. He restarted the business under the same name. Wrede invested on facilities and the business became flourishing again. The company form became limited liability company Oy Lehtoniemi Ab in 1917 and the ownership base was extended.

The portfolio consisted ships, steam boilers, steam engines and pumps. A large part of the customers were from Imperial Russia and later Soviet Union.

Oy Lehtoniemi Ab was discontinued in 1930 and itse premises were sold to A. Ahlström Oy. The facility was closed down in 1951.

== Background ==
Start of shipbuilding in Lehtoniemi dates back to late 1880s, when engineer Torsten Forstén bought a piece of land and started building ships together with his business partner Albert Krank. Krank had already started his business in 1886 in a leased area next to Taipale channel. The company name became Tehtaat Lehtoniemi & Taipale Fabriker. The first ship, called Salmi, was completed in 1889; in the following year two other ships, Suvas and Kalla, were built for the same customer. The quality was high and the order intake raised. Forstén left the company in 1892, after which Krank led the business alone; he was an innovative and enthusiastic engineer, who got many patents. Large part of the production went to Russia. In 1896 the company built a paddle steamer for a Moscow-based customer, and icebreaker Jermak, which went to Vladivostok; both ships were delivered in parts and assembled in Russia; they were too large to fit into the Saimaa Canal.

The company built also its own fleet, which comprised about ten vessels. The ships transported freight and tugged barges and logs.

The company bankrupted in 1901 due to economical recession and Krank died in the following year.

== Re-establishment ==
The premises were bought by Freiherr Carolus Wrede on 15 September 1902. He restarted the operations under the same name, Tehtaat Lehtoniemi & Taipale Fabriker. Wrede appointed engineer Harald Staffans as Technical Manager and invested on the facility modernising the plant. Subsequently, the yard experienced a new upswing. In 1910 a new roller slipway with a winch was completed. A large state-of-art equipped workshop for boilers followed in 1914. The timber used at the yard was produced in an own sawmill.

Transporting of raw material was done on waterway, but during the winter months by horses from Pieksämäki railway station. Transportation became easier when a railway line to Varkaus was completed in 1913 and a railway stop was built in Lehtoniemi.

== Ownership base expansion ==
During the 1910s the business had run well, but as the production and materials tied a lot of capital, the company was vulnerable to economic downturns. Reduction of orders from the most significant customer, Imperial Russian Army, led to difficulties. The company form was changed to limited liability company under name Oy Lehtoniemi Ab on 15 January 1917. A part of the shares were sold to a St. Petersburg businessman Harald Lundsten and Emissioni Oy. The facilities could be now further modernised; in summer 1922 installed compressor plant increased productivity significantly, and a new carpenter shop followed in 1927. The company got more orders and the production achieved the goals.

In 1925 the company owners were Liittopankki with 45% share, Kansallis-Osake-Pankki (28%) and Wilhelm Wahlforss (17%). In 1928 the ownership of Liittopankki had climbed up to 51%.

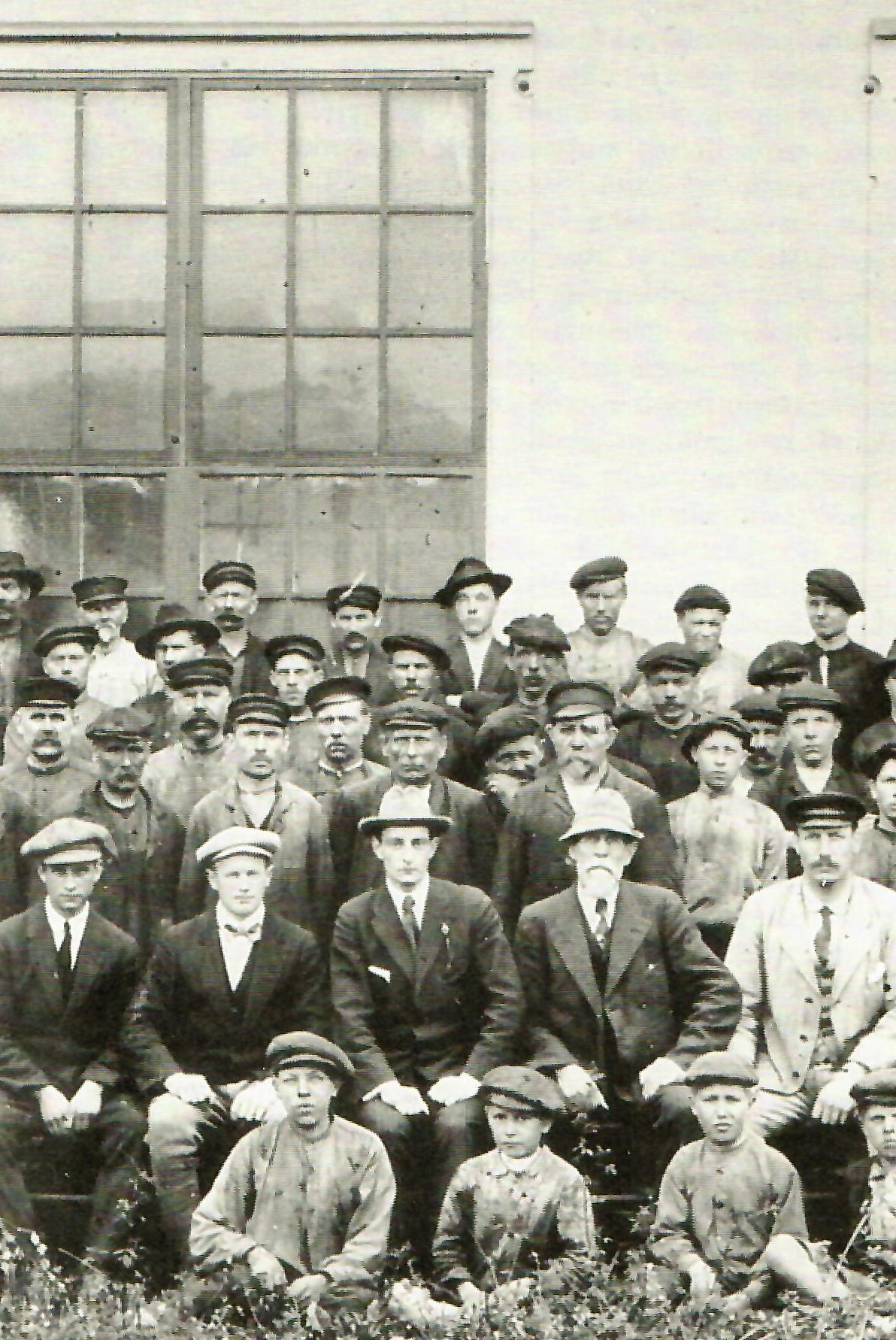
Lehtoniemi workers together with manager Wilhelm Wahlforss in the early 1920s.

== Managers ==
The following engineers worked as Lehtoniemi executive directors.

| Term | Name |
|---|---|
| 1905–1912 | Fredrik Borg |
| 1912–1914 | A. Åkerman |
| 1914–1916 | Rabbe Wrede |
| 1917–1921 | Armas Nikander |
| 1921–1925 | Wilhelm Wahlforss |
| 1925–1928 | T.W. Runeberg |
| 1928–1929 | Martin Dahlberg |

== Labour ==
A community of workers grew around the factory. The number of workers varied according to workload. The largest mentioned number of workers was over 600. Many of the workers lived in their own cottages or lodged in nearby houses. Initially there were seven houses with factory apartments, and later more were built. As was common at the time, the factory took care of the workers and their families. The workers had a sickness fund, library and reading room. The workers' children could go to school owned by the company. Also freetime activities flourished: the workers had a choir, brass quartet and gymnastics group.

The Lehtoniemi Labour Association was founded in 1904. The association was active since the beginning, and got also members from Varkaus, where the local A. Ahlström factory management did not tolerate labour movement. The association planned to build a community hall, but the project was cancelled due to a strike that took place on 20 April 1906. The strike ended soon, because a large part of the workers broke against the strike rather than became unemployed. The striking action weakened the Labour Association for a long time.

== End of production ==
At the end of the 1920s the company was hit by recession and it ceased operations in 1929. The overall production including Krank's era comprised 205 vessels for coastal and inland waterway shipping, the largest one being port icebreaker Suursaari. Almost half of the production was sold to Imperial Russia and Soviet Union. Other products than ships were 360 steam boilers, about 350 steam engines of various sizes, and a number of salvage pumps, steam winches and warping winches.

The Lehtoniemi premises were taken over by A. Ahlström Oy in the following year. The facilities were used for production of various small items. In the 1940s the main articles became acoustic insulation, and the factory was named Ääniteknillinen tehdas ("Acoustic factory"). The factory produced doors, windows, boards, furniture, boats and their construction kits. The factory was closed down for good in 1965.

== Ship gallery ==
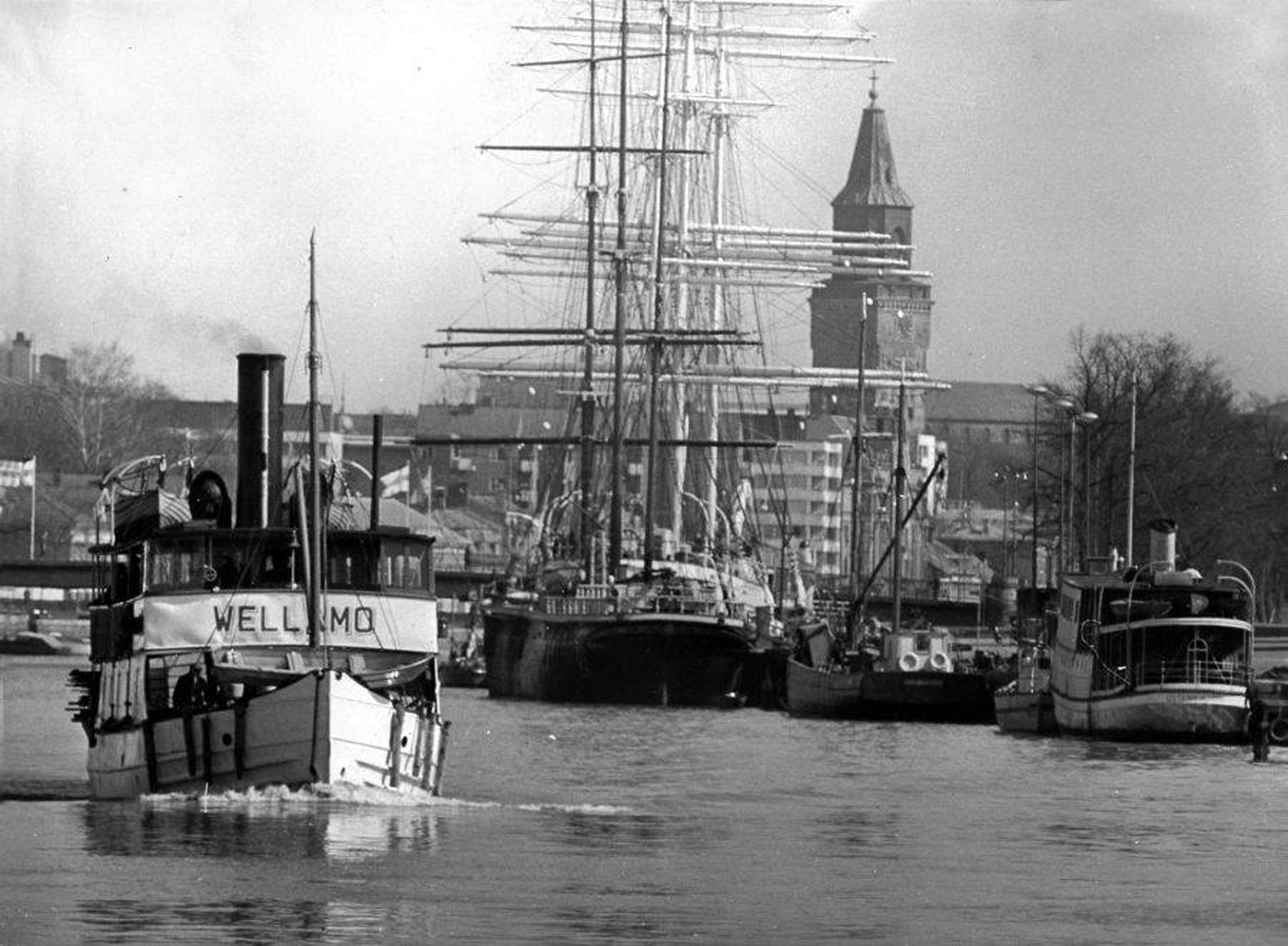
S/S Wellamo; built in 1906.

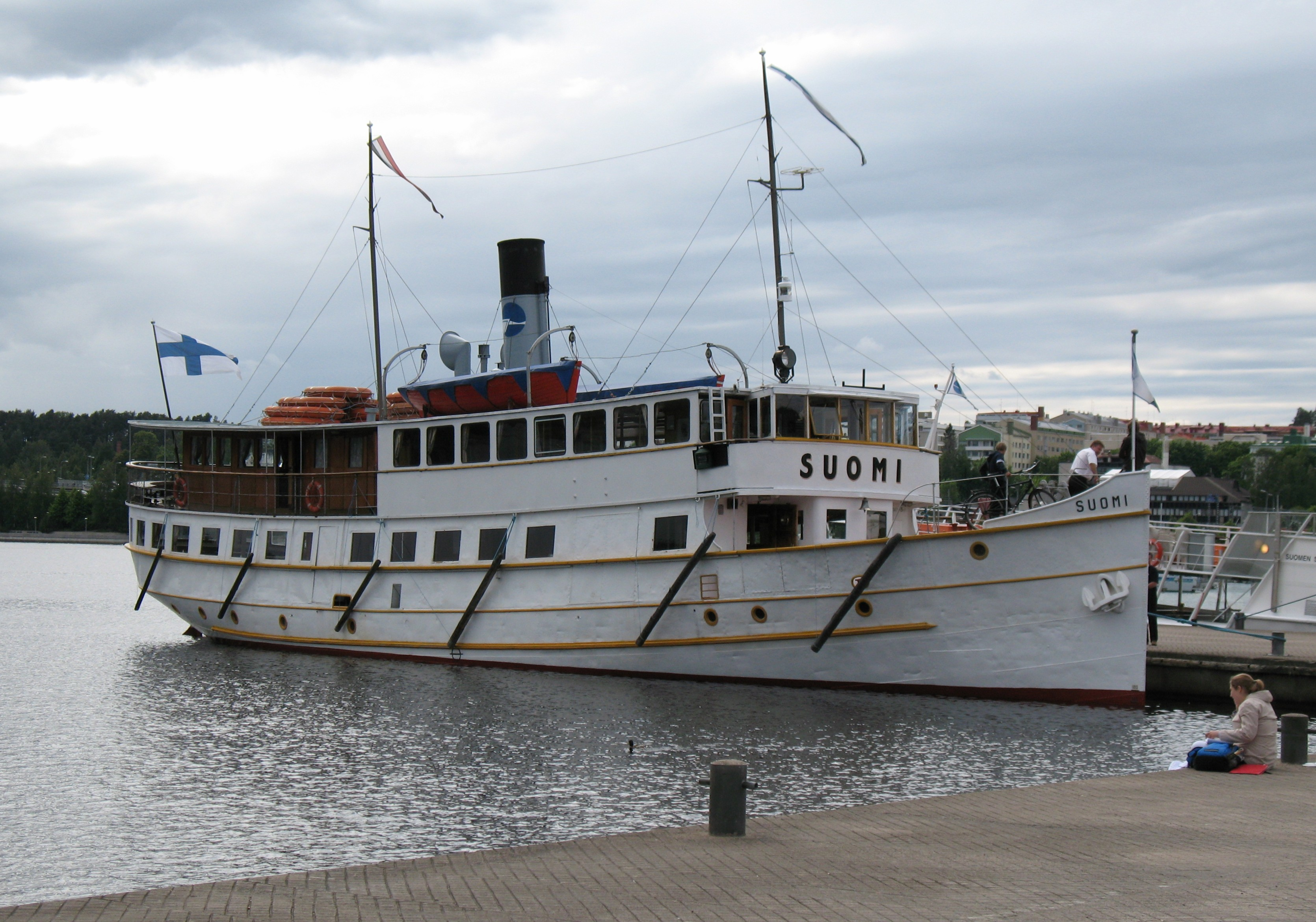
S/S Suomi; built in 1907.

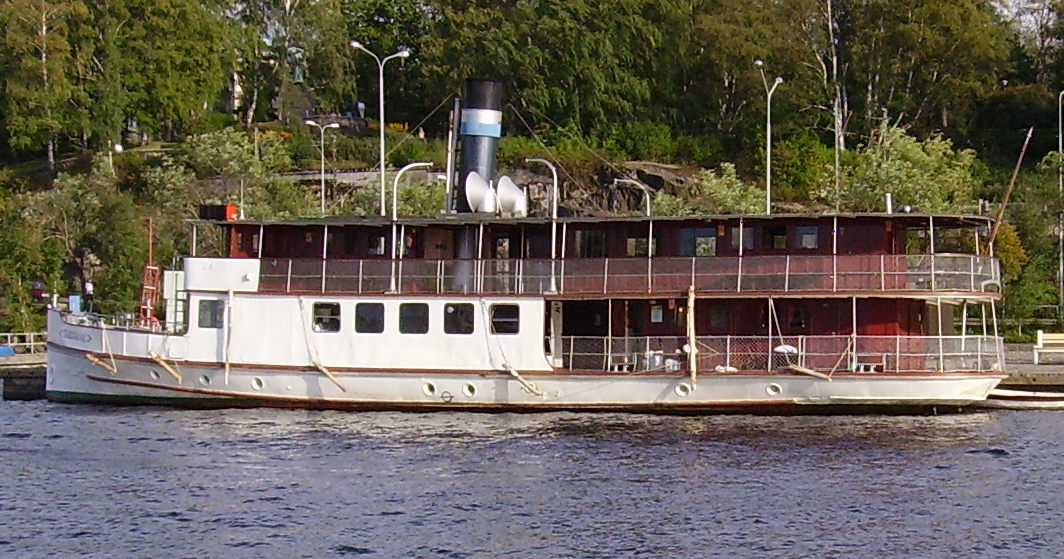
S/S Tarjanne; built in 1908.

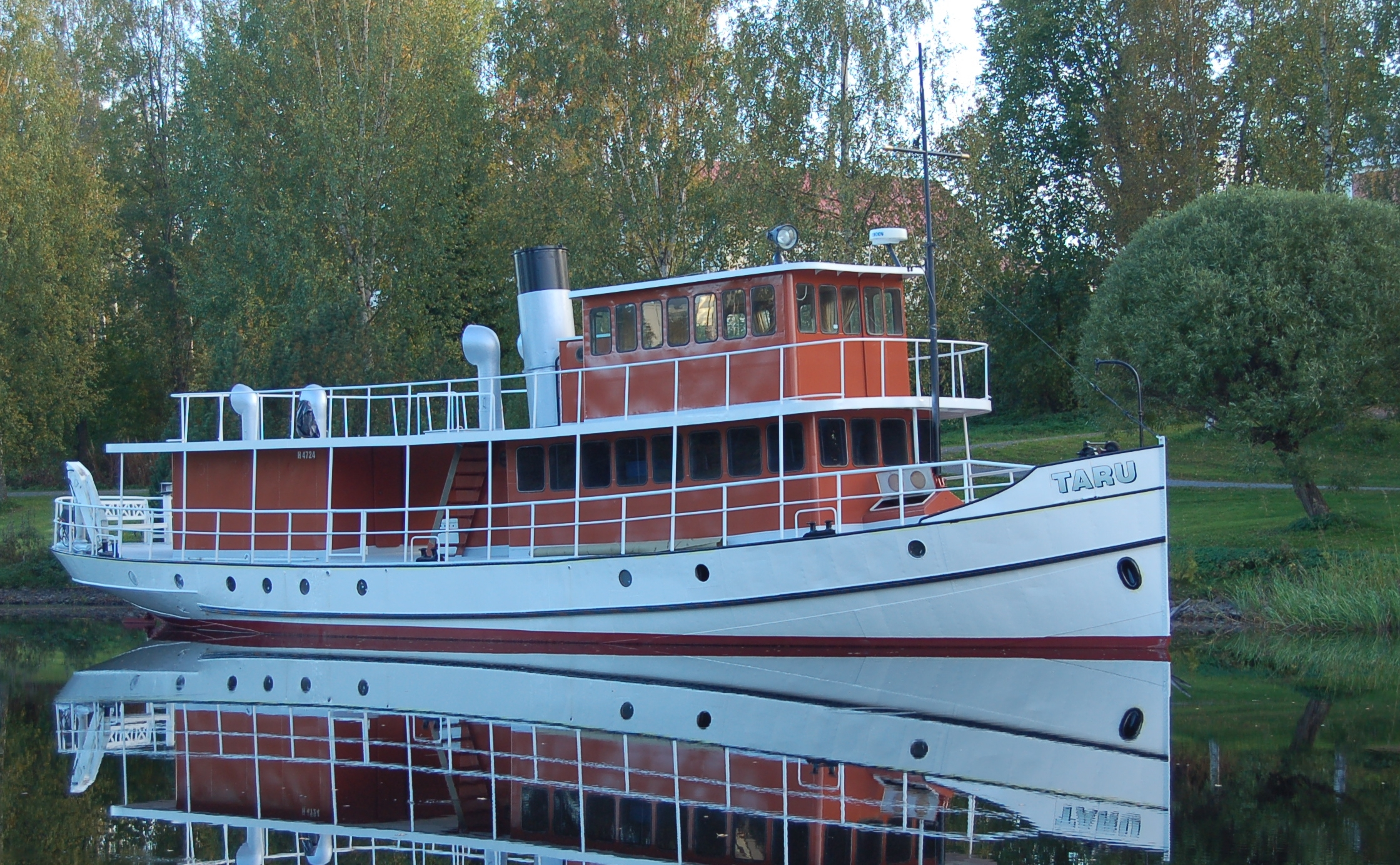
M/S Taru; built in 1919–1920.

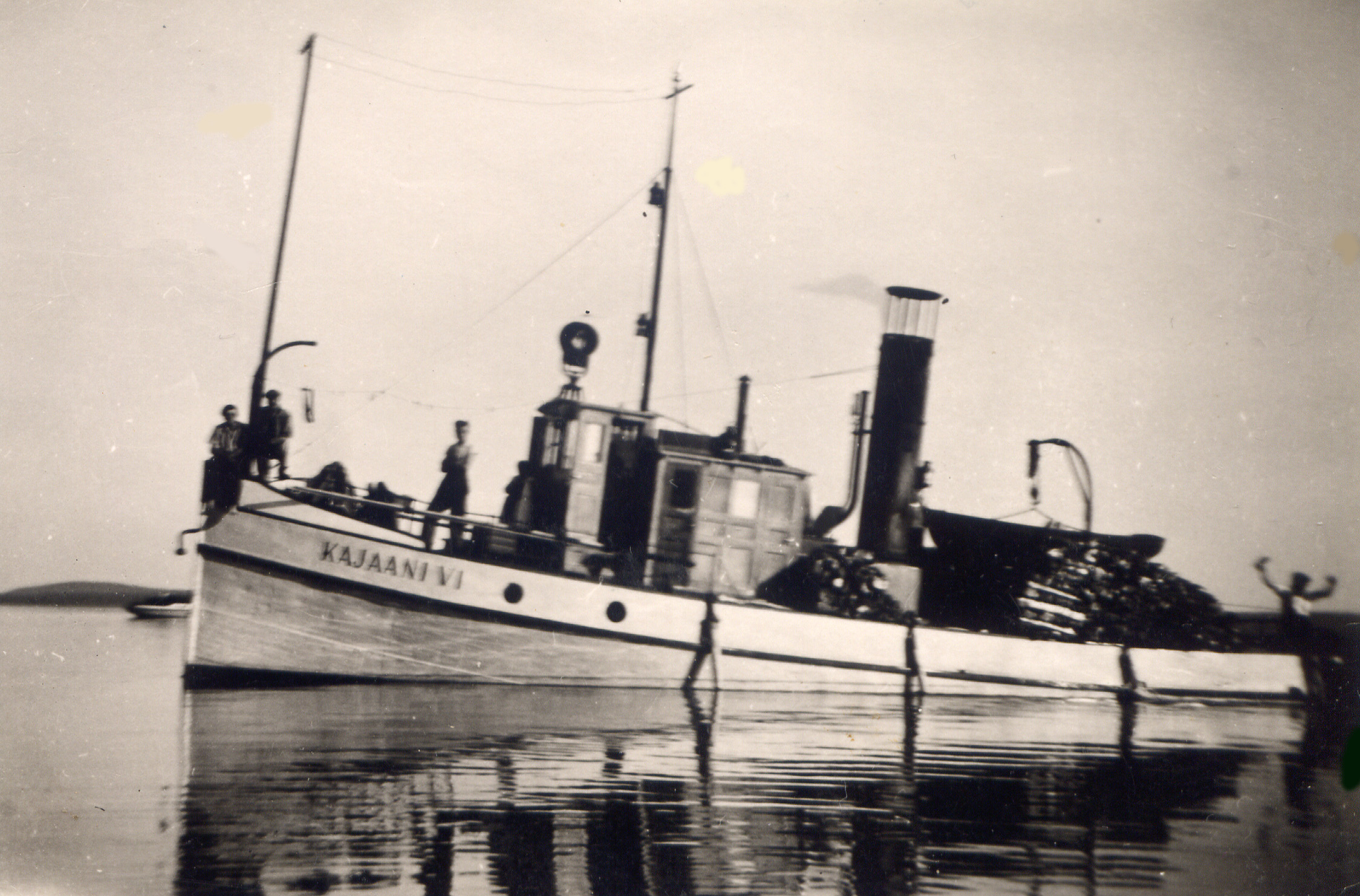
S/S Kajaani VI; built in 1921.

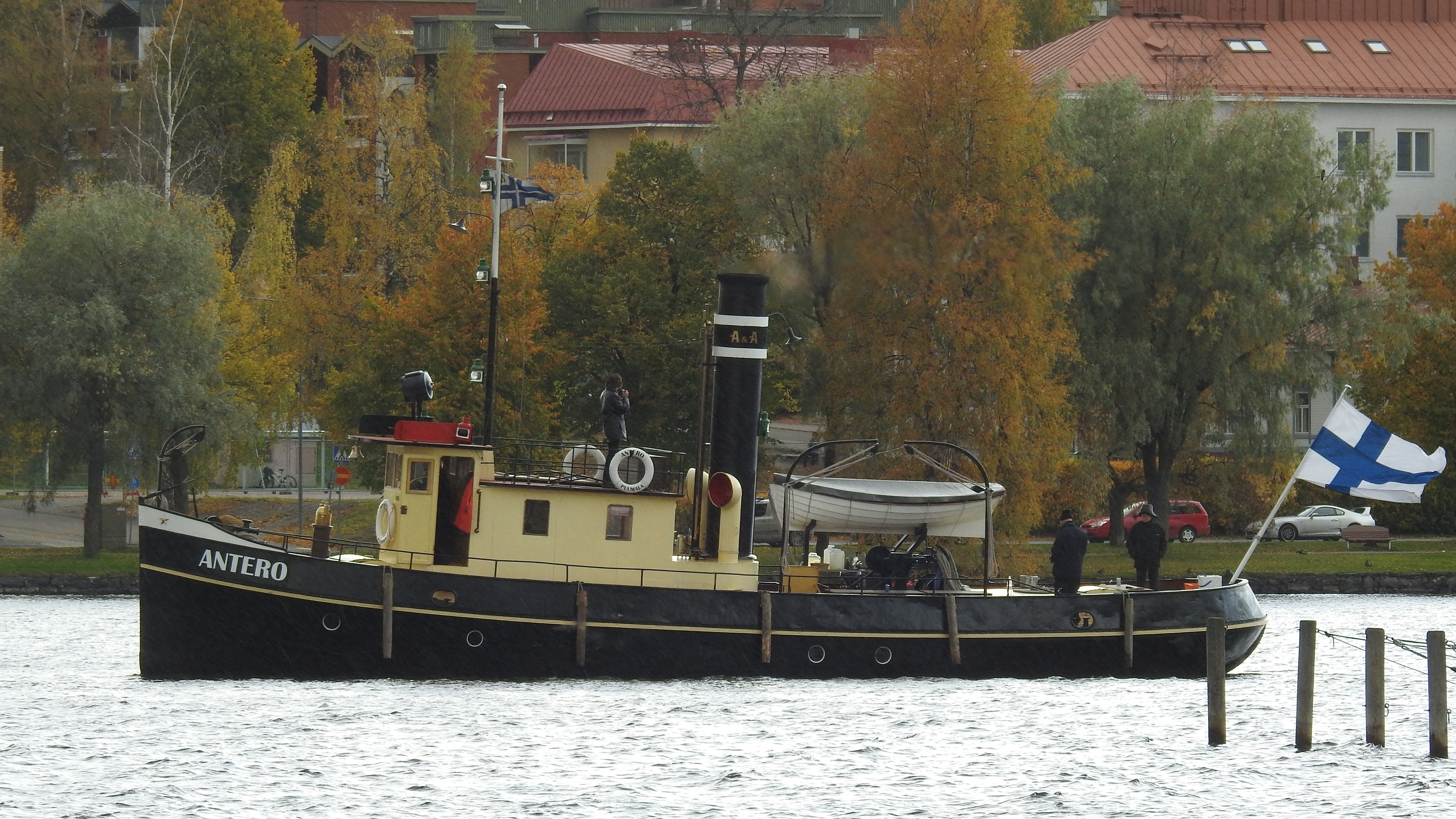
S/S Antero; built in 1924.
