= Gustaf Wrede =

Freiherr Gustaf Woldemar Wrede af Elimä
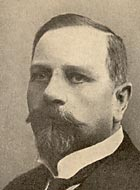
- Born: 28 July 1889; Leppävirta, Grand Duchy of Finland
- Died: 17 February 1959 (aged 69); Helsingin maalaiskunta, Finland
- Education: Technische Universität Darmstadt, B.Eng
- Employers: Jackson Automobile Company (1912–1914); Åbo Jernmanufaktur ock Waggonfabrik (1914–1919); Tykö bruks Ab (1920–1921); Ab Dalsbruk (1922–1940); Suomen Pultti ja Konetehdas Oy (1924–1934); Suomen Lasitehdas (1935–1946); Petsamon Nikkeli Oy (1940–1945); Ares Oy (1945–1951); Valmet Oy (1954–1958)
- Spouses: Ebba née Tollet (1915–1919); Karin Sophie née Andelin (1920–1946); Asta née Örtengren (1948 →)
- Parent(s): Carolus Wrede and Siri, born Söderhjelm
- Awards: Memorial Medal for War of Freedom; Commander of the White Rose of Finland (1936); Commander of Dannebrog (1939); Cross of Liberty, 3rd Class (1940); Memorial Medal for Winter War; Medal of Liberty, 2nd Class (1944); Cross of Liberty, 2nd Class (1945); of the Order of the Lion of Finland, 1st class (1946); Commander of the White Rose of Finland, 1st class (1956)

Gustaf Woldemar Wrede af Elimä (28 July 1889 – 17 February 1958) was a Finnish Freiherr, engineer and businessman. He is best known for his contribution to Finnish tractor production.

Wrede was born to influential Finnish industrialist Wrede family; his father Freiherr Carolus Wrede worked as manager in number of Finnish engineering companies. Due to his background, Wrede got a good education and subsequently a good position in his father's company, in which he designed Kullervo tractor.

As manager of AB Dalsbruk Wrede grew a hardy manager who saved the company from closure and developed the production. During World War II Wrede led the nickel mining company Petsamon Nikkeli Oy. After the war he led the metal industry production for war reparations to the Soviet Union. As manager of Valmet, Wrede participated in developing of Valmet tractors.

== Early years and studies ==
Wrede's parents were Freiherr, manager Carolus Wrede and Siri, born Söderhjelm. His nickname within the family was Dutta. The affluent Finnish-Swede Wrede family had been involved in industrial development for generations already. Carolus Wrede was the main owner of engineering companies Åbo Jernmanufaktur and Åbo Waggonfabrik. It was rather natural, that also Gustaf Wrede became oriented towards engineering. He studied eight grades in Swedish-speaking Nya svenska läroverket in Helsinki. In 1907 he started studies in Technische Universität Darmstadt in Germany where he graduated in 1911 as Mechanical Engineer.

Wrede's sister Siri married Wilhelm Wahlforss, who later became an influential businessman. Wrede and Wahlforss worked both as colleagues and later they both lead large competing engineering companies.

== Kullervo ==
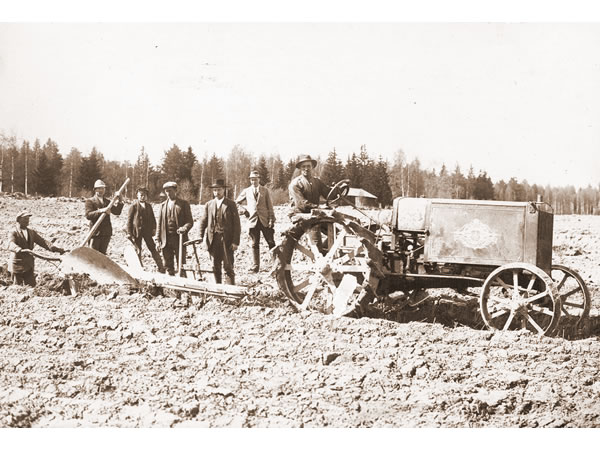
Kullervo tractor ploughing.

Carolus Wrede's companies produced agricultural machinery and he became interested in tractors, as he saw a big market potential in the Russian Plains where fields reached as far as the eye can see. Right after his studies Gustaf Wrede travelled to the United the States to learn more about vehicle production. He worked for a number of automotive companies in 1911–1912. During 1912–1914 he worked as chief engineer for Jackson Automobile Company in Michigan, where he focused on learning tractor technology. In 1914 Wrede returned to Finland and became Chief Engineer of Åbo Jernmanufaktur, where he started to develop a tractor. The First World War, which started shortly after, slowed down the development work; the factory was completely stopped during the Civil War in 1918. The new tractor was finally introduced in the following autumn. In the meantime, Finland had become an independent state and the prominent Russian market was closed. However, the market in the Baltic states looked promising. Serial production of Wrede's tractor named Kullervo started in 1919. Kullervo was produced in two variants of different engine outputs. The stronger, 30-hp version was originally intended for the Russian export. The smaller, 15-hp model was designed for the domestic market. While the construction was modern, Kullervo did not become a sales success; despite government subsidies, the American Fordson ruled the Finnish market. Production ceased in 1924, when just 300 units were sold.

In 1920–1922 Wrede worked as a general manager in another agricultural machinery producer Tykö bruks AB

== Dalsbruk ==
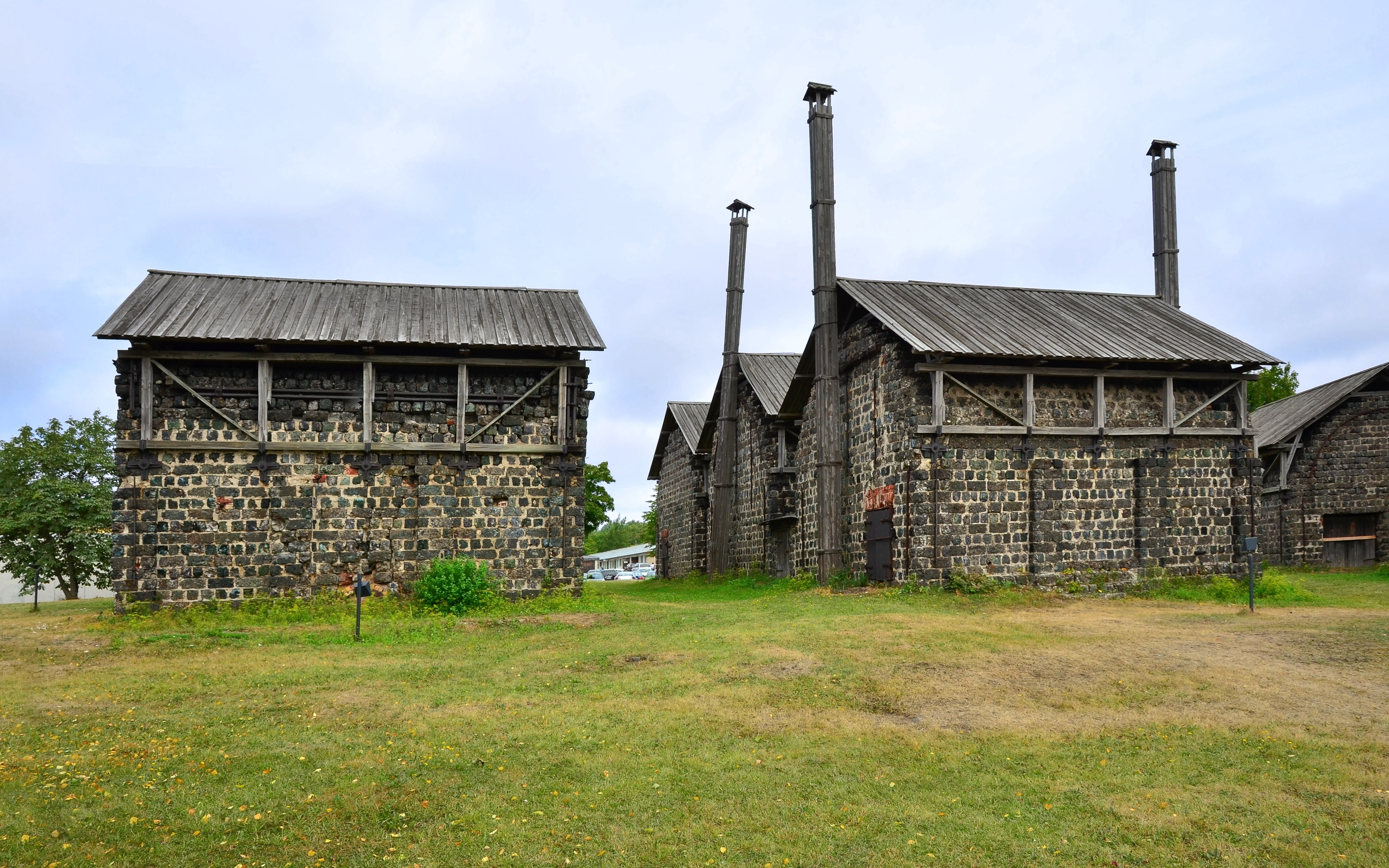
Old coal furnaces in Dalsbruk.

Wrede was recruited to lead AB Dalsbruk in 1922; Dalsbruk produced basic ironware products, such as bar iron, chain and nails. Finland was in an economical upswing and Wrede started an investment programme. Despite intense price competition, the company's order book was filled. In January 1924 Dalsbruk became part of the German Wuppermann company, which secured its financial status giving security to investments; the most important ones were a new foundry and a modern rolling mill. The Wuppermann family had high expectations for the potential of the Dalsbruk factory and invested a total of 23.5 million Finnish marks in it. The youngest son of the owning family Gerhard Wuppermann was appointed deputy director.

Already in 1926 the company started to have problems; it was hit by recession and a strike that lasted over two months from June until August. The problems continued the following year, with strikes and a lockout for a total of seven months. When this was over, the economic cycle had deteriorated further. Dalsbruk then operated with just a four-day week and the number of shifts was cut down. The Wuppermann family had to fund the operations by bills of exchange. The company still owned large areas of land which was eventually sold; this reduced the need for borrowing money. In 1929 the company's debt reached 5.5 million marks and in addition the Wuppermann family had worked up a debt for Dalsbruk for 10.5 million. The Wuppermanns decided to run down operations in Dalsbruk in a hygienic manner. In September 1930 the family gave the Dalsbruk shares to Wrede, who then had to make the tough decisions. The salaries were cut, the chain and nail production was sold off and the headcount was reduced. As the Finnish government changed its tariff policy ro more favourable levels, Wrede managed to press the losses down in 1930–1931. Abandoning of gold standard in autumn 1931 and the subsequent devaluation improved Dalsbruk's competitiveness. On the other hand, following the collapse of the international raw material bar cartel, competition had become more intense and prices dropped.

In 1932 Dalsbruk got a large order for train wheels and axles from the State Railways, which led to an immediate improvement; prices had stabilised, the factory was saved, Wrede had become its owner and paid compensation to the Wuppermann family for continuation of operations. Wrede continued investing in the Dalsbruk.

Before Dalsbruk, Wrede had succeeded in his life mainly because of his noble background and wealthy family. The experience he gained as manager had a major impact on the rest of his life and toughened him to perform in his later duties. In 1939 he sold his Dalsbruk shares to Wärtsilä Group, a company led by his brother-in-law, Wilhelm Wahlforss.

During 1924–1934 Wrede led Suomen Pultti ja Konetehdas Oy and in 1935–1946 he worked as manager of Suomen Lasitehdas.

When the Winter War broke out in 1939, Wrede was appointed the acting manager of Wärtsilä Group in the meantime when Wahlforss travelled abroad to negotiate about war material purchasing.

== Petsamon Nikkeli ==
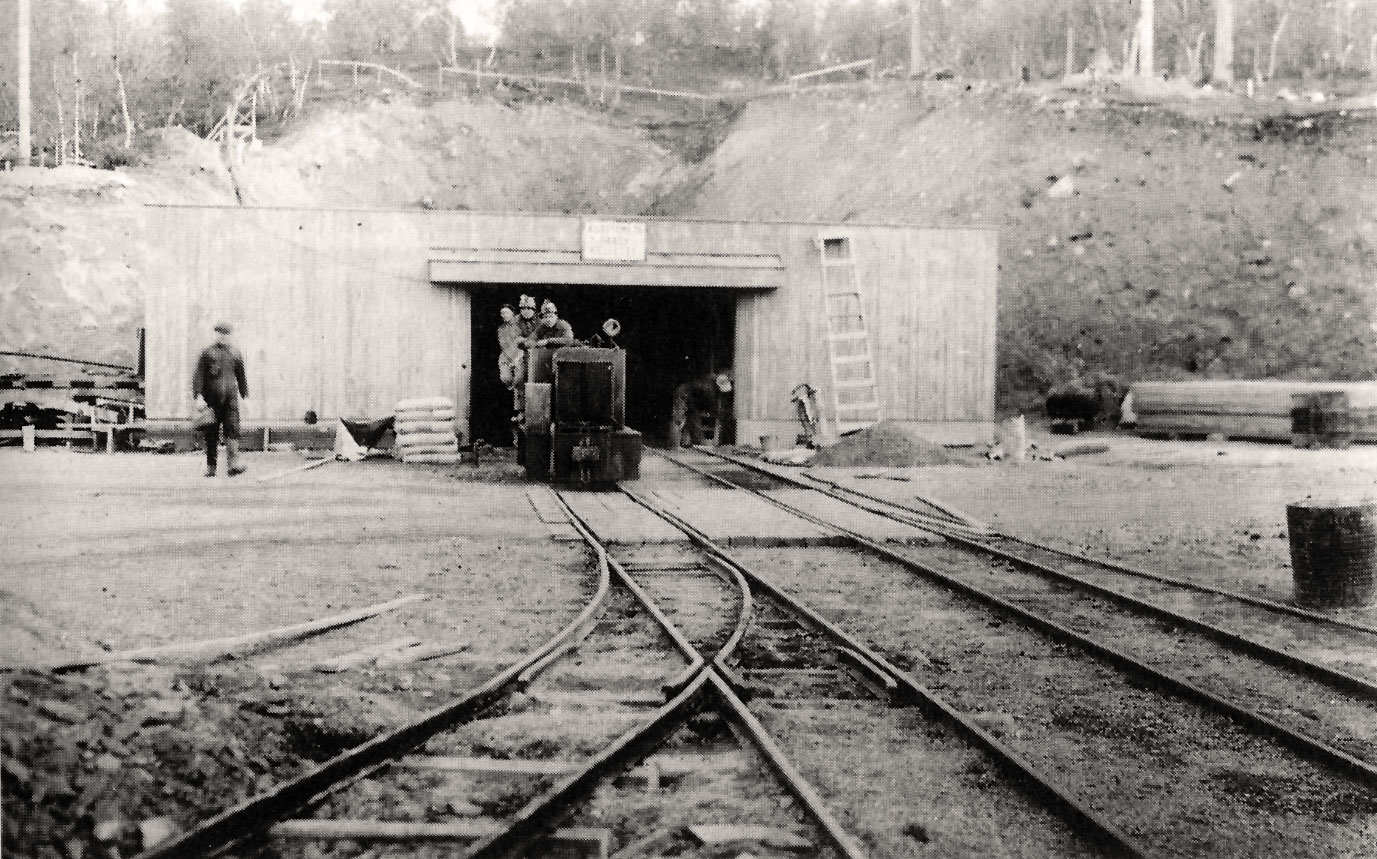
Petsamo nickel mine in the 1930s.

Wrede got an offer for manager position in Petsamon Nikkeli Oy in Petsamo 1940, right after the Winter War. He took the challenging position and sold his Dalsbruk shares. The company management had recently decided to invest on Kolosjoki mine and Wrede led the construction project determinedly. The mine was in focal point in global politics: Petsamon Nikkeli belonged to British Mond Nickel Company which wanted to close the mine when the Finnish-German relations started to improve during the Interim Peace. In response, the Finnish government took the mine under its control. Mining began in 1940 and the nickel was sold to Germany for low price. Continuation War between Finland and Soviet Union began in 1941. Wrede worked under high pressure negotiating about deliveries and other conditions with the German customers. In addition to the company, Wrede led the community grown around the mine. Due to political conditions, Wrede had to leave the mine in September 1944; he placed the company keys on his office desk before he left. Subsequently, Petsamo was ceded to Soviet Union in Moscow Armistice.

== Valmet ==
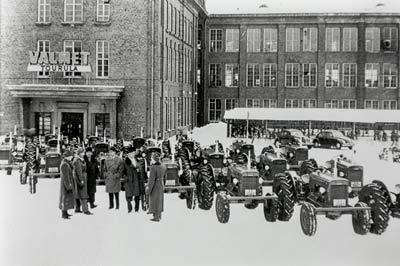
New Valmet tractors at State Rifle Factory in the 1950s.

Wrede presents the Valmet 33 diesel tractor to Urho Kekkonen in November 1956.

After the war Wrede was called to lead engineering industry production in Delegation of War Reparation Industry (Soteva), where he worked in 1944–1952. In 1945–1951 he worked as manager of Ares Oy. He was nominated to lead Valmet but the left-wing member of the board resisted the idea. Situation changed in the 1950s after Finland had paid off the war reparations – Valmet fell into crisis, as it had to find new lines of business and start working in free market. The company needed an experienced and determined leader, and Wrede became selected new manager of Valmet in 1954 after nomination by Väinö Tanner. Valmet had been formed by putting together a number of companies, many of them experienced in defence industry. It was the most significant domestic competitor of the other leading Finnish engineering company Wärtsilä Group − managed by Wrede's brother-in-law.

When seeking for a new direction, Valmet had started producing tractors. Wrede had a passion to the subject, originating from his youth, and he participated actively on tractor designing. Finnish agriculture mechanised rapidly in the 1950s and Valmet tractors gained a strong foothold in the domestic market.

Gustaf Wrede died at his home in Königstedt Manor in February 1958 after suffering of cancer.

== Political career and organisational activities ==
During 1937–1940 Wrede was chairman of the Finnish Metal Industry Employers' Association. He was board member in Employers' Central Association in 1932–1933, 1937–1943 and 1955–1956 and chairman in 1941–1942.

In 1935–1940 Wrede was chairman of Dragsfjärd municipal council.

== Character ==
Wrede was regarded as proficient engineer. As a manager Wrede was an old school industrialist who rather built connections than oriented on marketing. There are number of examples when Wrede rather approached politicians instead of competing in open market.

== Personal life ==
Wrede was married for three times. A 1915 started marriage with Ebba née Tollet ended in divorce in 1919. He got married again in 1920 to Karin Sophie née Andelin in 1920 and the couple divorced in 1946. In 1948 Wrede married Asta née Örtengren; this marriage lasted until Wrede's death.

In 1949 Wrede bought Königstedt Manor for his residence.

== Sources ==
- Zilliacus, Benedict (1984). Wilhelm Wahlforss (in Finnish). Translated from Swedish by Riitta Valajärvi. Porvoo: Oy Wärtsilä Ab. ISBN 951-99541-8-X.
