= Alfred Wahlforss =

Finnish chemist and professor

Henrik Alfred Wahlforss
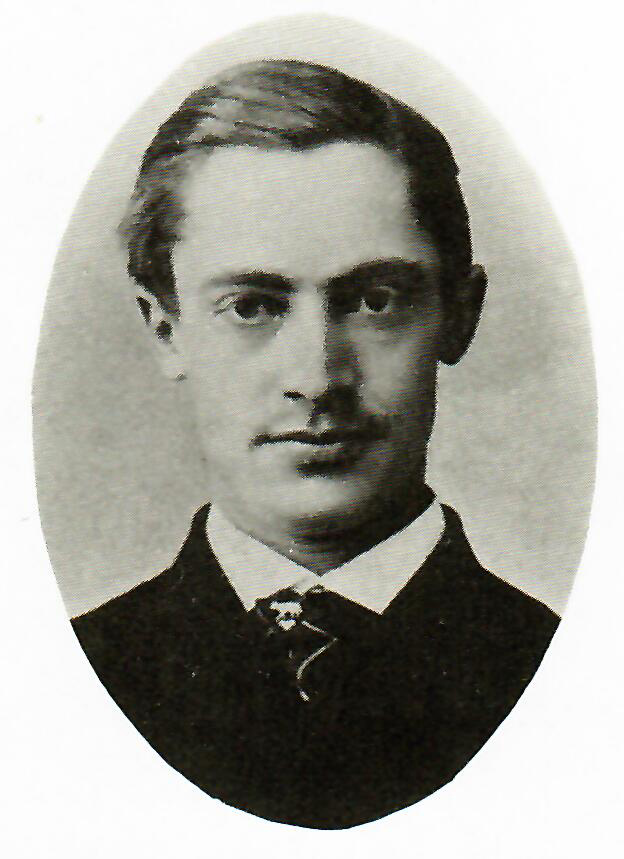
- Born: 1839; Kristinestad, Grand Duchy of Finland
- Died: 28 March 1899 (aged 59–60); Helsinki, Grand Duchy of Finland
- Education: PhD, chemistry
- Occupation: professor
- Employer: Polytechnical institute
- Notable work: Bidrag till kännedomen af Retén (1867); Om bromtoluolklorid (1870)
- Spouse: Emilia Elisabeth née Långhjelm
- Children: Elisabeth, married Karvonen (b. 1883); Henriette (b. 1885); Wilhelm (1891–1969); Eric (b. 1895)
- Parent(s): Eric Wahlforss; Susanna Maria née Holmudd

Henrik Alfred Wahlforss (1839 – 28 March 1899) was a Finnish chemist and professor.

Wahlforss lectured in Polytechnical institute in Helsinki. His scientific achievements were related to his publishing about retene, para-bromobenzyl chloride and the oxidation of castor oil. As Wahlforss's publications were written in Swedish, they remained internationally without attention.

Wahlforss's research career was influenced by his alcoholism. A heart attack ended his career, after which he spent his last years paralysed.

Alfred Wahlforss was married twice. The first spouse remains unknown. The second wife was Emilia Elisabeth Långhjelm, with whom he had two daughters and two sons. The older son Wilhelm became later a corporate director and Eric became a paper mill manager.

== Early years and studies ==
Alfred Wahlforss was born in 1839 in Kristinestad, Grand Duchy of Finland. His parents were Eric Wahlforss and Susanna Maria née Holmudd. Alfred was the second oldest of nine children. He went to school in Vaasa, where he did his matriculation exam at age of 18. At age of 12, he earned a medal by saving his friend from drowning.

Wahlforss went on to study chemistry in Helsinki and completed his Bachelor's degree four years after. Talented Wahlforss received a scholarship and studied the three following years in Zürich, Hanover and Göttingen, where he earned his Master's degree.

== Career ==
Upon his return, Wahlforss was appointed teacher of practical chemistry and laboratorian at Helsinki Technical College. He had started to research retene already his time in Göttingen and presented his study in 1867. Despite having just Master's degree, Wahlforss received a docentship and a scholarship to continue his research. During 1868–1869 he worked for Friedrich Konrad Beilstein in St. Petersburg, and in 1870 he presented another study "Om bromtoluolklorid". The latter study was especially significant and it became Wahlforss's doctorate thesis, but because it was published in Swedish it received little attention. A similar study was published in United States for 12 years later, and another one in Germany at the turn of the century by researchers Wilhelm Wislicenus and Rudolf Grützner. It is notable, that Beilstein does not mention Wahlforss's work in his famous book Handbuch der organischen Chemie, although must have been aware of it.

Wahlforss applied for professorship in chemistry in the Imperial Alexander University in Helsinki, but withdrew his application. A potential reason for this was his alcoholism. Possibly Wahlforss's grant applications for travelling were repeatedly rejected for this reason – apart from a period he worked in Berlin, which did not lead to any publishing. For a long time Wahlforss did not publish anything, until in 1888 he presented the first part of series of studies, which handled castor oil oxidation products, enanthic acid in particular. Due to this, Wahlforss was appointed professor in the Polytechnical Institute. He published studies about the topic until his paralysis in 1896.

Wahlforss's achievements were based on his persistent, thorough and detailed work, rather than great innovations.

The former students remembered Wahlforss as a good lecturer, whose passion to the subject remained evident. While the lessons were often chaotic and without structure, the learning outcomes were good – Wahlforss explained complicated topics in small parts easy to embrace, and he often spiced the lessons with anecdotes.

== Personal life ==
While Wahlforss gained a lot professionally during his time in St. Petersburg in 1868–1869, but he also increased his alcohol consumption while in the large metropolis. He married a local woman whose identity remains unknown, but returned alone to Finland. During the following years the alimony Wahlforss had to pay for the spouse and two children burdened his personal finances heavily.

At latest in 1882 Wahlforss started a relationship with 19-year-old Emilia Elisabeth Långhjelm and in the following year they had a daughter, Elisabeth; another daughter, Henriette, followed in 1885. The marriage with the unknown Russian woman was possibly still in force, and this could be the reason why the couple lived for long together before marrying in 1890. After that they had two sons: Wilhelm in 1891 and Eric in 1895.

Wahlforss suffered an infarct during cycling trip in midsummer 1896. He was taken home unconscious. Wahlforss spent the rest of his life partly paralysed and unable to walk and speak; he had also lost his memory. He died on 28 March 1899.

Wahlforss's sons became later notable business people. Wilhelm became a large company director and Eric managed a paper mill.

== Sources ==
- Zilliacus, Benedict (1984). Wilhelm Wahlforss (in Finnish). Translated from Swedish by Riitta Valajärvi. Porvoo: Oy Wärtsilä Ab. ISBN 951-99541-8-X.
