= Eric Wahlforss =

Finnish chemist and businessman (1895–1951)

Eric Alfred Wahlforss
- Born: 21 May 1895; Helsinki, Grand Duchy of Finland
- Died: 5 October 1951 (aged 56)
- Education: DSc, chemistry
- Notable work: Nya monosubstitutionsprodukter av reten (doctoral thesis, 1924)
- Spouse: Christiane Wahlforss
- Parent(s): Henrik Alfred Wahlforss and Emilia Elisabeth Långhjelm
- Relatives: Wilhelm Wahlforss (brother)

Director of Wärtsilä Selluloosa Oy Äänekoski Pulp Mill
- In office 1942–1951

Eric Alfred Wahlforss (21 May 1895 – 5 October 1951) was a Finnish chemist and businessman.

Wahlforss's father died when he was young. He studied chemistry and did his DSc in 1924. He emigrated to United States and worked as a chemist for Arthur D. Little, Industrial Process Ltd, Hammermill and Glidden Co. He returned to Finland, and from 1937 to 1941 he worked for A. Ahlström. In 1941 Wahlforss got a manager position in Wärtsilä Selluloosa Oy Äänekoski Pulp Mill, where he stayed until his death in 1951.

== Early years and studies ==
Wahlforss was born as fourth and youngest child of chemist Alfred Wahlforss and Emilia Elisabeth née Långhjelm. His older brother was Wilhelm Wahlforss, who later became a notable company manager. The father was paralysed in 1896, when Eric was just one year old, and died in 1899. Wahlforss did his matriculation exam in 1914 and graduated MSc in 1919. In the following year he made a field trip to United Kingdom and graduated Candidate of Philosophy. In 1924 he graduated DSc. The topic of his thesis was retene mono substitution products.

== Career in the United States ==
Wahlforss travelled to Boston, United States and worked for Arthur D. Little Inc. simultaneously studying in Massachusetts Institute of Technology during 1925–1926. in 1926–1929 he was the Main Chemist at Industrial Process Ltd and years 1929–1933 he worked as Chemist for Hammermill Paper Company in Erie, Pennsylvania. In 1933 Wahlforss got a position of Technical Manager in Glidden Co., where he worked until 1936.

== Career in Finland ==
Wahlforss repatriated and got employed as main chemist at A. Ahlström Oy Varkaus factory in 1937. In 1941 he became executive director in Wärtsilä Selluloosa Oy Äänekoski Pulp Mill and in the following year he was appointed managing director. At the time, the Chief Executive of Wärtsilä Group was his older brother Wilhelm Wahlforss. 92% of the Äänekoski production was newsprint. The times were difficult due to the prevailing war and the company's paper machine was down most of the time. Later the company built a chemical factory, which produced spirits, vinegar, yeast, weed control agent and detergent. Eric Wahlforss led the plant until he died in 1951.

== Positions of trust ==
Wahlforss was the Director of Teknolog-Förening in 1920 and Vice Chairman of American Chemical Society in 1930–1933. He was member of the Äänekoski town council in 1941–1944.

== Personal life ==
Wahlforss was an outdoor person and his main interest was focused on hunting and dogs.

During his years in the United States, Wahlforss had developed a drinking problem. It got worse by time and he started to have difficulties to get along with his assistants and subordinates. He had often disputes with his brother about the way how the company should be managed, but the brothers had cordial relations. In Wilhelm's 60th anniversary celebration, June 1951, Eric gave a speech in which he expressed respect and admire about his brother's achievements. When Eric Wahlforss committed to suicide in the same October, Wilhelm was deeply shocked, and subsequently sold the whole business unit.

== Sources ==
- Zilliacus, Benedict (1984). Wilhelm Wahlforss (in Finnish). Translated from Swedish by Riitta Valajärvi. Porvoo: Oy Wärtsilä Ab. ISBN 951-99541-8-X.
