= Wilhelm Wahlforss =

Finnish engineer and industrialist

vuorineuvos Emil Wilhelm Wahlforss
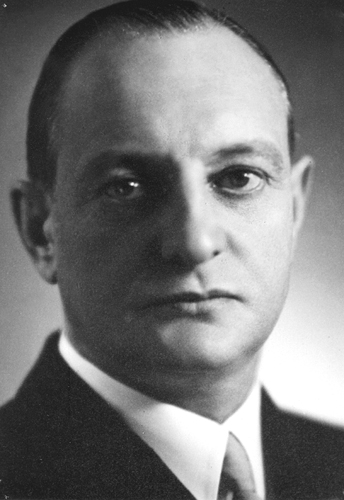
- Wilhelm Wahlforss in the 1920s.
- Born: 25 June 1891; Helsinki, Finland
- Died: 20 June 1969 (aged 77); Nagu, Finland
- Other names: Vikkelä-Ville, "Quick-Willy"
- Citizenship: Finnish
- Education: diplomi-insinööri
- Alma mater: Helsinki University of Technology
- Employers: Nobel 1916; Turun Rautateollisuus Oy 1916–1917; 1919–1921; Fiskars Ab 1917–1919; Oy Lehtoniemi Ab 1921–1925; Turun Verkatehdas Oy 1924–1925; Oy Sofia Zweygberg Ab 1925–1926; Ab Wärtsilä Oy (later Wärtsilä Corporation) 1926–1969
- Political party: SFP
- Spouse: Siri Johanna née Wrede (1917 →)
- Children: Christel, married Rosenlew (b. 1918); Susanna, married Barner-Rasmussen (b. 1921)
- Parent(s): Henrik Alfred Wahlforss and Emilia Elisabeth Långhjelm
- Awards: vuorineuvos 1941; Commander Grand Cross of the Order of the Lion of Finland; Cross of Liberty, 1st Class; Commander of the White Rose of Finland; Cross of Liberty, 2nd Class; Medal for Merit, 2nd Class; Commemorative Medal for War of Freedom; Commemorative Medal for Winter War; White Guard Cross of Merit; Commander of St. Olav; Commander of the Royal Order of Vasa, 1st Class; Doctor of Science honoris causa

Manager of Lehtoniemi
- In office 1921–1925

Manager of Sofia Zweygberg
- In office 1925–1926

Manager of Wärtsilä
- In office 1926–1961
- Preceded by: Lars Wilhelm Åberg
- Succeeded by: Bertel Långhjelm

Emil Wilhelm Wahlforss (25 June 1891 – 20 June 1969) was a Finnish engineer, industrialist and vuorineuvos.

== Early life ==
Wahlforss was born in Helsinki, the capital of Grand Duchy of Finland. His father Henrik Alfred Wahlforss was an appreciated chemistry teacher in Polytechnical institute; his mother, Emilia Elisabeth née Långhjelm, was 24 years younger and originally from Ostrobothnia. The couple had four children: 1883 and 1885 born daughters Elisabeth and Henriette, and 1891 and 1895 born sons Wilhelm and Eric. While the father was doing significant research, his work, which was written in Swedish, remained without international attention. Another hindrance for his success was his drinking problem. He died in 1899 when Wilhelm was just eight years old. The family fell into poverty and moved often in the following years, however, staying in the same area, Oulunkylä.

== Studies ==
During his school years in Swedish Normal School Wilhelm Wahlforss had classmates who later became influential, such as Hugo Österman and Hjalmar Strömberg. Wahlforss did well at geography and other subjects which required remembering, but not at mathematics, and particularly languages and writing created difficulties. He graduated few months late in autumn 1911 because first failed his matriculation exam in Finnish, the main language of the state.

In September 1911 Wahlforss signed up for mechanical engineering studies in his father's former workplace which had been in the meantime renamed University of Technology. His orientation was textile industry. His strong areas were mechanics, physics, inorganic chemistry and economics, but in such subjects which required practical skills, as laboratory exercises, his ratings were "satisfactory". He took part in student activities and was active in the students' union. Wahlforss had a hectic social life, as an organiser he was efficient and determined, and he is described as a self-confident and charming person. Already during his studies he decided to become a manager of some large company. At the end of his studies Wahlforss focussed on heavy machinery and industrial economy. He did his internship in De Förenade Yllefabrikerna AB in Helsinki, Finlayson repair workshop in Tampere and later in Helsinki at Hietalahti Shipyard and Engineering Works, and finally in State Railways' Engineering Works foundry. For his master's thesis he made a complete and detailed calculation about textile factory economics and gained excellent rating, graduating in March 1916.

In autumn 1915 Wahlforss started dating Siri Johanna Wrede, a young lady from Turku of the affluent Finnish-Swede Wrede family.

== Early career ==
=== Nobel and Turun Rautateollisuus ===
Wahlforss started his working career as a draftsman at Nobel arms company in Saint Petersburg in February 1916, but he returned to Finland already in May. After Wahlforss got engaged with Siri Wrede, he became a workshop engineer in Turun Rautateollisuus in Turku which was then led by Siri's father Freiherr Carolus Wrede. The work was technical and intense, as the company order book was full of ammunition and other military equipment ordered by the Imperial Russian Army. He quit in early 1917, possibly to rejoin many of his old classmates who had enlisted in the Jäger Movement to fight against the Russian rule. Wahlforss had wanted to join the movement but was not accepted, because he was regarded as the provider for his mother and younger brother. Another possible reason for leaving might have been his manager and brother of his fiancé, Gustaf "Dutta" G.W. Wrede whom he mostly got along well with but found his sarcasm tiring at times.

=== Fiskars ===
Wahlforss's new workplace was in Fiskars rolling mill, where he was appointed workshop technical manager under Albert Lindsay von Julin. Julin supported him a lot, sharing his experience and knowledge, but offered also a warning example about dangers of alcohol in business relations. Wahlforss enjoyed his work; he led a team of younger engineers and got a lot of freedom at renewing the outdated facilities.

Wilhelm Wahlforss married Siri Wrede in April 1917, and soon the couple started to expect a child. But soon times became turbulent – Carolus and Dutta Wrede were maltreated and captured for six days by workers and Russian seamen in November. Labour movement was increasingly radicalising and the Fiskars factory was only protected by some dozen men with carbines who could have done little against the 500 workers, who, however, stayed calm during the soon following civil war. In February the time of birth was getting closer, and for this Siri Wahlforss travelled to Turku which was in hands of Red Guards. Wilhelm Wahlforss was a leader in Pohja Civil Guard and he participated in actions of the White Guard. His personal involvement is unclear but it is strongly suspected that the troops he led participated in the executions of dozens of Red Guard soldiers in Nummi. Their daughter Christel was born on 12. March 1918.

=== Return to Turun Rautateollisuus ===
In 1919, after two years in Fiskars, Wahlforss returned to Turun Rautateollisuus; Gustav Wrede was appointed manager of Teijon Tehtaat and Wilhelm Wahlforss became the new technical manager. In the same year he travelled to USA to learn tractor production. Wahlforss had more space to operate than before, but he aimed higher – he wanted to become director.

=== Lehtoniemi ===
In 1921 Wahlforss got an opportunity to demonstrate his business skills – he was appointed General Manager of Lehtoniemi shipyard and engineering works, which was another company partly owned by Carolus Wrede. The company operated in Lehtoniemi and Taipale close to Varkaus, Savonia, and had fallen into trouble after losing its market in Russia. Wahlforss worked hard travelling around Finland and making new customer contacts. The order book never became very long but Wahlforss managed to improve the financial result of the company from 906 000 marks' loss to 147 000 marks' profit. Siri Wahlforss, who moved to Lehtoniemi in October 1921 together with Christel and three weeks old second daughter Susanna, did not like the too rural area. The period in Lehtoniemi helped the couple financially.

=== Adventure in textile industry ===
The family moved back in Turku, when Wahlforss bought major share of textile factory Turun Verkatehdas in autumn 1923 jointly with investor Harry Olsson. He financed the bargain largely with a bank loan. The company was in a difficult situation; the market had dropped due to cheap import and the machinery was worn out. Wahlforss could not turn the business profitable. Recovering of the company would have needed patience and capital, and Wahlforss had neither of them. Finally, the company was sold to Nordic Wool Company in late autumn 1924; the new owner Leo Wainstein was a calm and patient man – opposite to Wahlforss – and managed to turn the factory to flourish again. This was the biggest defeat of Wahlforss during his whole career. The money he managed to save he invested on Lehtomäen Konepaja, where he returned, but left again after seven months – and again to textile sector.

=== Sofia Zweygberg ===
In August 1925 Wahlforss started working for Viipuri textile distributor company Sofia Zweygberg, which had large debts and outstanding payments, and the managing director had recently died to a lightning strike. The desperate company hired Wahlforss for a high salary to reorganise the company. First Wahlforss put focus on getting the payments, and after half year he had collected 1.3 million marks of payments. The second action was selling of real estates and the Finlayson shares the company owned. The 1.27 million marks' loss of 1924 was decreased to loss of 0.9 million marks in 1925. Next Wahlforss put effort on increasing the sales and the result of 1926 showed 1.85 million marks' profit. But he left the company already at beginning of June, because he regarded his task was completed, and he had been offered a new interesting challenge.

== Wärtsilä ==
Ab Wärtsilä Oy, an iron works in Värtsilä, Northern Karelia, was in financial problems; the company was deeply in debt due to a long-time unprofitable operation. Wahlforss had gained reputation as a capable restructurer and hired as General Manager of the company. Wahlforss repeated the same as he had done before – he started to travel around the country to introduce the company products, but soon he realised that the company would not become profitable by producing just raw iron bars. Wahlforss decided to step up in degree of processing and soon the company started producing nails, band iron, radiators and other products. With these actions Wahlforss managed to lead the company result slightly to positive side in period 1927–1931, but it still did not manage to shorten its debts.

New problems came in 1931 during the Great Depression; Wärtsilä's financial situation got alarming and it was on verge of bankruptcy. The trading was stopped in Helsinki stock exchange. But two factors saved the company; the first one was galvanised wire production, which Wärtsilä had started right before the depression as the first company in the Nordic Countries. The second one was the company personnel which agreed about lowering of salaries in order to save the company. Already in 1932 Wärtsilä could pay dividend to its shareholders and the same trend continued in the following years.

Robert Mattson, the major shareholder of engineering company Kone- ja Siltarakennus, died in 1935. Kone ja Silta was a big industrial company that owned a big workshop in Hakaniemi in Helsinki, but also the Hietalahti shipyard and Crichton-Vulcan in Turku. Mattson's shares were kept in strongroom in Pohjoismaiden Yhdyspankki (PYP) as deposit for debts. Rainer von Fieandt, who was a board member in Kone ja Silta, Wärtsilä and PYP, organised together with Wahlforss a gigantic acquisition – Wärtsilä, an East Finnish company with 700 employees, took over the leading metal industry company of Finland in 1935. The transaction was fully funded by a loan given by PYP.

The new Wärtsilä Corporation lead now four units which all were barely profitable; therefore, many financial specialists expressed their doubts on the future of the company. However, Wahlforss restructured and developed the corporation determinedly during the 1930s. In 1938 the total number of employees reached 6 000.

The acquisition put Wahlforss on pedestal; he was the chairman first in the Finnish Metal Industry Association in 1937–1942 and thereafter in the Finnish Industrial Union 1942–1946. During the Second World War he travelled to USA to purchase weapons. After the war ended, Wahlforss participated in negotiations about war reparations with Soviet Union representatives and he was sent to Paris to attend as an expert attendee in the peace treaty negotiations in 1947. Over 40% of all war reparations which consisted of metal products were produced by Wärtsilä. At the end of 1940s number of personnel in Wärtsilä reached already 11 000.

Until 1954 Wahlforss was a member of delegation that negotiated about Soviet exports. In his negotiations with Soviet representatives he gained a reputation as a businessman, making a number of deals with the Soviet Union despite not knowing very much about naval architecture and only speaking a couple of words in Russian.

Wahlforss resigned from the position of General Manager in 1961 but he remained as board member until his death in 1969.

== Political career ==
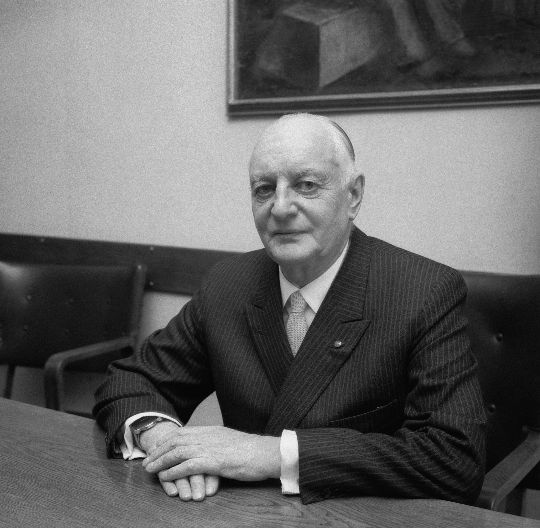
Wahlforss in later life, 1966.

Wahlforss entered into politics at the end of the 1950s and he was selected with a large number of votes to the köping council of Espoo in 1960 municipal elections as a member of Swedish People's Party. However, Wahlforss was used to make decisions quickly and he did not get used to political processes. He also could not apply his knowledge of economics. He left the council just after one and half year during the term.

Wahlforss participated in the so-called Honka alliance which was a wide-spectrum political project for overthrowing Urho Kekkonen in presidential elections of 1962. The alliance failed and got revealed and after this the personal relationship between Kekkonen and Wahlforss remained cold. Despite this, the men co-operated successfully in the Soviet trade relationships; Kekkonen promoted actively exports of the Finnish companies and Wärtsilä was the biggest individual Finnish exporter to Soviet Union.

== Sources ==
- Zilliacus, Benedict (1984). Wilhelm Wahlforss (in Finnish). Translated from Swedish by Riitta Valajärvi. Porvoo: Oy Wärtsilä Ab. ISBN 951-99541-8-X.
- von Knorring, Nils (1995). Aurajoen veistämöt ja telakat (in Finnish). Espoo, Finland: Schildts Förlags Ab. ISBN 951-50-0735-6.
