= Sofia Zweygberg =

Finnish textile wholesaler

Margaretha Sofia Zweygberg
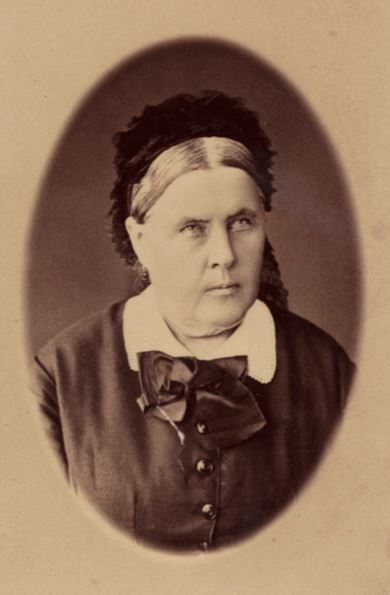
- Born: née Tilén; 10 July 1828; Lohtaja, Grand Duchy of Finland
- Died: 19 November 1883 (aged 55); Viipuri, Grand Duchy of Finland
- Occupation: merchant
- Spouse: Gustaf Adolf Zweygberg
- Children: Carl Gustaf (b. 1853, died early); Johan Adolf (b. 1854); Carl Alexander (1856–1857); Sofia Emilia, married Grönroos (1858–1916); Bertha Matilda (1860–1860); Carl Gottfrid (1862–1865)
- Parent(s): Matts Andersson Tilén and Anna Sofia Fredriksdotter

Margaretha Sofia Zweygberg (née Tilén; 10 July 1828 — 19 November 1883) was a Finnish textile wholesaler.

Zweygberg founded and led textile sales company Sofia Zweygberg that became largest of its kind in Finland. Its operations were focused in eastern parts of the country.

== Family ==
Sofia Tilén was born in Lohtaja, Grand Duchy of Finland. Her parents were sailor Matts and Anna Tilén. In 1851 she was married to shoemaker and sniper Gustaf Adolf Zweygberg (b. 1826). The couple had four sons and two daughters during 1853–1862; however, three of the sons and one daughter died in their early years. Later Gustaf Zweygberg disappeared in Saint Petersburg.

== Career ==
In 1868 Zweygberg founded her own retail company for Tampere-produced yarn and cotton in Viipuri market hall. The company and the selection grew rapidly due to her effective and skillful management. In 1878 Zweygberg began wholesale operation in the whole East Finland. Over several years her company was the largest cotton sales company of the Grand Duchy. The most important market was in the Karelian Isthmus, due to Russian tourists.

After Zweygberg's death in 1883, the company was continued by her son-in-law Viktor Ferdinand Grönroos. Following to his death, the company management went to the widow Sofia Grönroos, Zweygberg's daughter. The company name became Oy Sofia Zweygberg Ab in 1913.
