= Königstedt Manor =

Manor house in Vantaa, Finland

Coordinates: 60°20.694′N 024°50.759′E

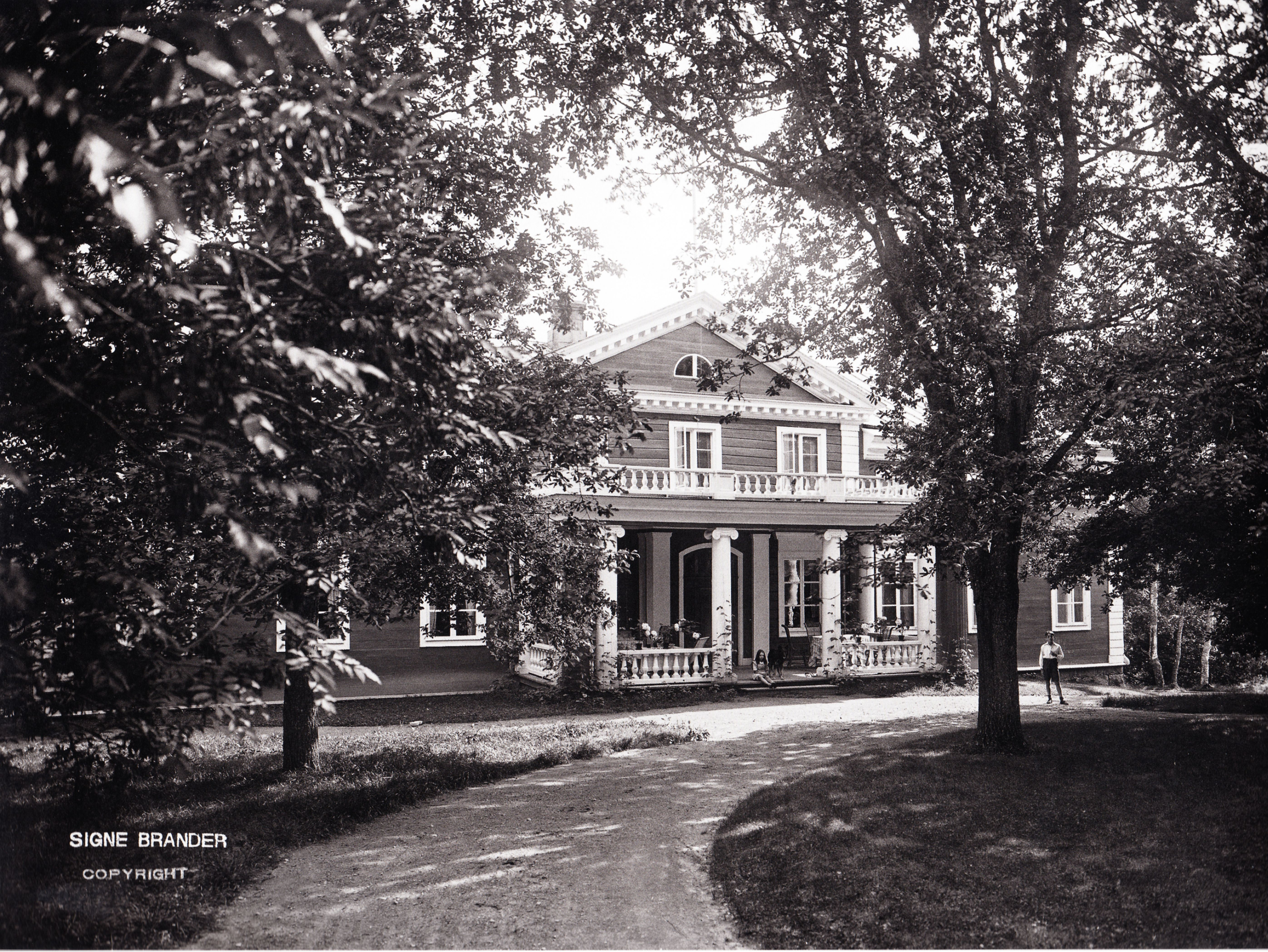
The entrance facade

Königstedt Manor (Finnish: Königstedtin kartano or Swedish: Königstedt gård) is a historic manor house in Riipilä in the municipality of Vantaa, Finland, close to Helsinki. The mansion is located at the bank of the Vantaa river. Currently, it is used as a state guest house by the Finnish Government. It regularly serves as a venue for various meetings, negotiations and receptions.

== History ==
The manor is first mentioned in 1511, when Olav Nilsson, the governor of Helsinki is the owner. Under captain Johan Köhn, who was raised to nobility under the name of Köhnningstedt, the mansion received its name.

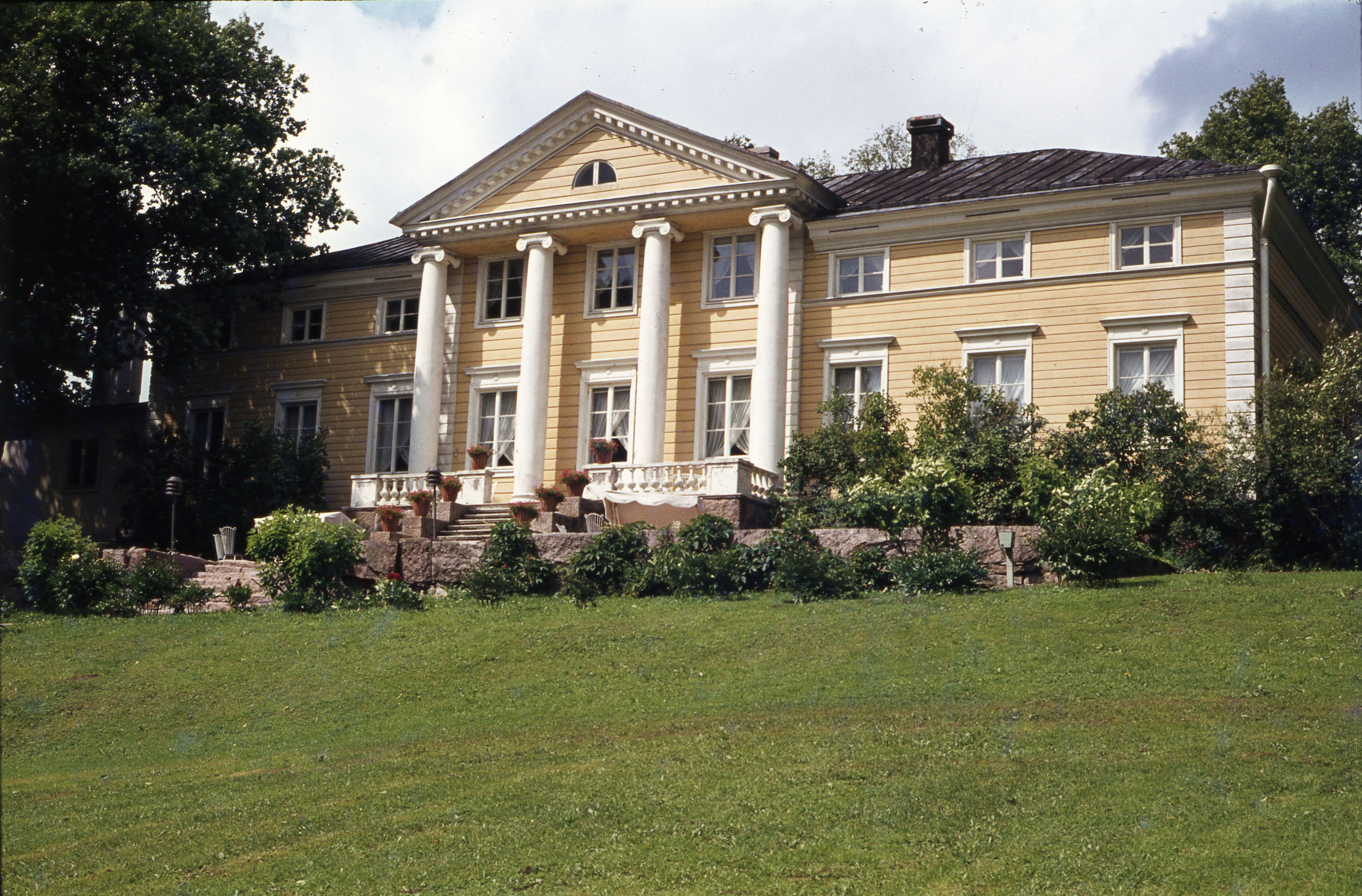
The garden facade

Counsellor of State Jacob Wilhem Hisinger constructed the present house in 1816. According tradition Carl Ludvig Engel is the architect, although some presume it is his assistant Pehr Granstedt who did the design. In the 20th century there were many owners such as Robert Mattson, Colonel Mikael Gripenberg, and Baron Gustaf Wrede. The Finnish Government purchased the manor from Baroness Asta Wrede in 1961.

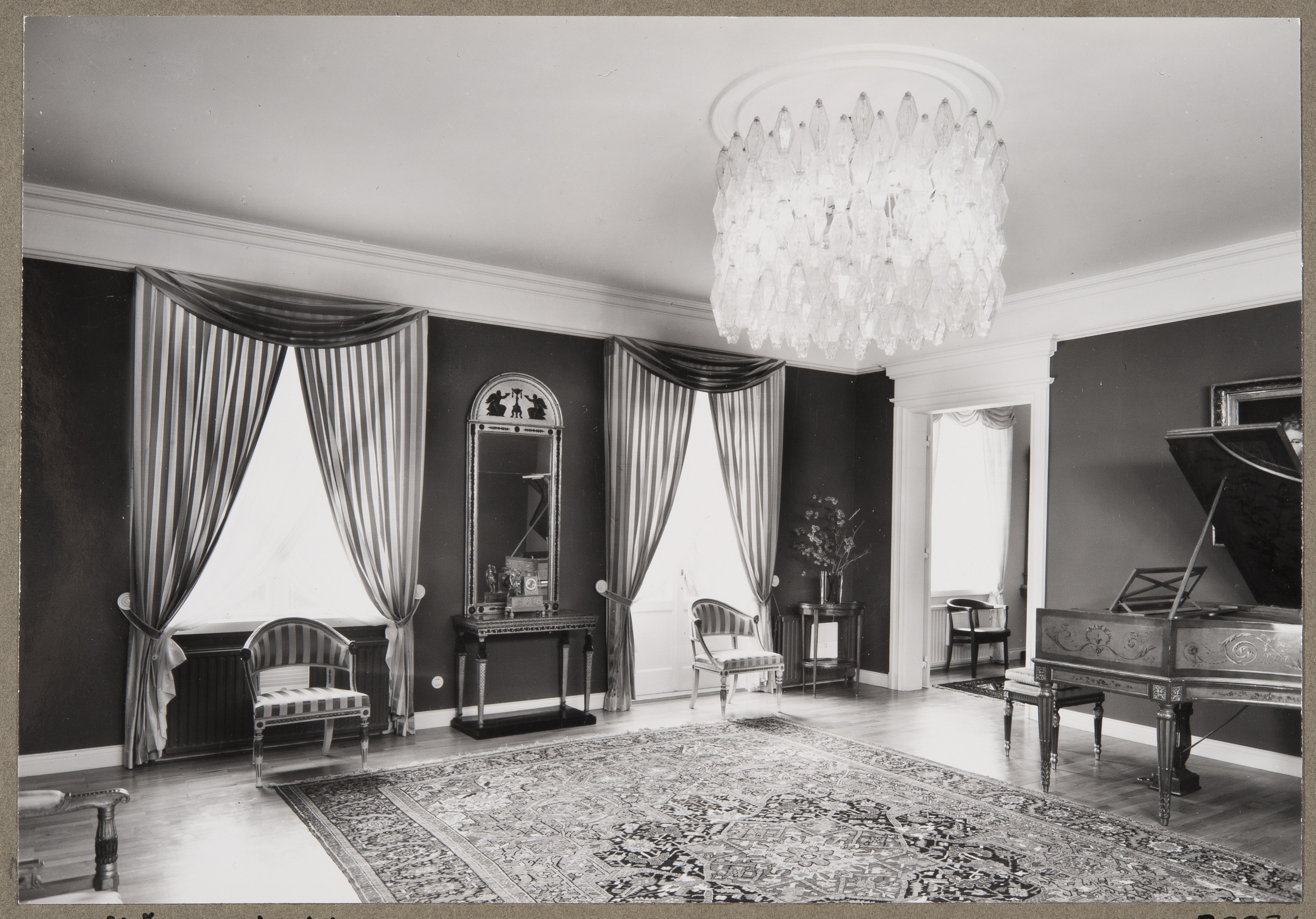
A reception room

The Aceh peace talks between the Free Aceh Movement and the Indonesian Government, hosted by Finnish President Martti Ahtisaari were held at the manor in 2005. Meetings between North Korean, South Korean and American delegations took place at the mansion in 2018 as preparation for the 2018 North Korea–United States summit. Königstedt Manor hosted the first meeting of the NATO trilateral memorandum between Finland, Sweden and Turkey on 26 August 2022.

== Architecture and design ==
The exterior of the manor is designed in neoclassical style and received its yellow/ white colours in 1825. The interior is in Empire style and is coloured in grey scales combined with stronger tones. The main rooms are the Entrance Hall, the Library, Dining Room, Yellow Reception Room, Green Salon and Blue Coffee salon. The furniture is a mix of Empire, Gustavian style and neo-rococo.

The manor has been repaired various times. During the first restoration, a veranda with Ionic columns was added to the mansion. Further restorations were in the 1930s, when the columns facing the garden were erected, the 1950s when central heating was included and in 1997.

The house is surrounded by a park. The estate surrounding the manor covers 35 hectares, primarily used for farming and horse and livestock raising. In addition, there is an apple orchard, a site of glassworks and a chapel.
