= Men Can't Be Raped =

1978 film by Jörn Donner

- Film poster
- Swedish: Män kan inte våldtas
- Directed by: Jörn Donner
- Screenplay by: Jörn Donner
- Based on: Manrape by Märta Tikkanen
- Produced by: Jeanette Donner; Jörn Donner; Anssi Mänttäri
- Starring: Anna Godenius; Gösta Bredefeldt; Toni Regner
- Cinematography: Bille August
- Edited by: Irma Taina
- Music by: Heikki Valpola
- Production companies: Jörn Donner Productions; Stockholm Film
- Distributed by: Doperfilme; Endfilm Christian Meinke; Fox-Stockholm Film Distribution; Impegno Cinematografico; Stiftelsen Svenska Filminstitutet; Adams Filmi Finnkino; Studio S Entertainment
- Release date: 1978
- Running time: 99 minutes
- Country: Finland
- Language: Swedish

Men Can't Be Raped (also known as Manrape; Swedish: Män kan inte våldtas) is a 1978 Finnish-Swedish "rape and revenge" drama film directed by Jörn Donner, based on the novel Manrape by Märta Tikkanen. It tells the story of a woman (Anna Godenius), who, after being raped by a man (Gösta Bredefeldt), begins to shadow her abuser with revenge in mind.
