= Henrik Tikkanen =

Finnish-Swedish author

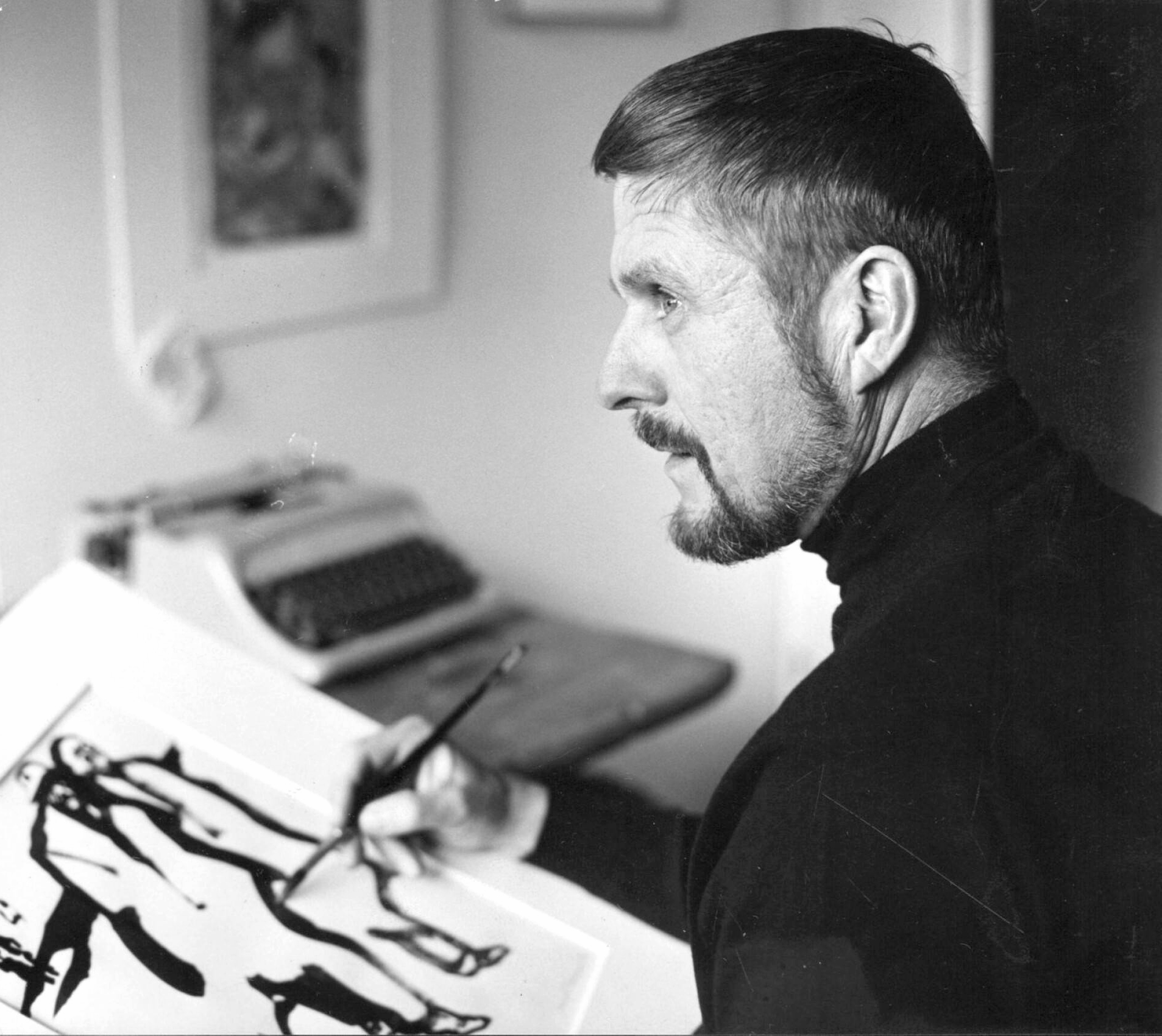
Henrik Tikkanen in 1967

Georg Henrik Tikkanen (9 September 1924 in Helsinki – 19 May 1984 in Espoo) was a Finland-Swedish author, known primarily for anti-war literature. Several of his works are either autobiographical or semi-autobiographical. Though Finnish, he published primarily in his mother tongue, Swedish. He was born and lived much of his life in Helsinki, and died of leukemia in Espoo. He was married to the Finnish writer Märta Tikkanen.

== Biography ==
He was the son of architect Toivo Robert Tikkanen and Kylliki Ingeborg Vitali, great-grandson of Paavo Tikkanen and grandson of Johan Jakob Tikkanen. Tikkanen was married to Vaike Lia Alla Etrock from 1949 to 1962 and to Märta Eleonora Cavonius from 1963. Tikkanen had no formal artistic training. As a teenager he contributed illustrations to weekly magazines and children's books, and drew the series "Konrad" which was published in Svenska Pressen. After graduating from Helsingin suomalainen yhteiskoulu (Helsinki Finnish Co-educational School) in 1943, he pursued liberal arts studies and received some guidance in graphic techniques from some active graphic artists. From 1947 to 1967, Tikkanen was a journalist, columnist and cartoonist for Hufvudstadsbladet and from 1967 he was artistic director for the Finnish-language daily Helsingin Sanomat and from 1977 for Dagens Nyheter. He served on the board of the Association of Swedish-speaking Writers in Finland from 1972 to 1976. Tikkanen was the recipient of several awards for his work, including the Längman Prize in 1970, the Eino Leino Prize in 1975, the State Prize for Literature in 1976 and 1983, and prizes from the Society of Swedish Literature in Finland in 1973, 1976, and 1981. Tikkanen's cityscapes of Helsinki, in which he depicted the city's characteristics in simple lines, are particularly well-known. As a draftsman, he worked mainly in ink and produced a series of black-and-white drawings as a quick draftsman for various restaurants and companies in Finland. He participated in a large number of exhibitions in Finland, Denmark and Sweden. Tikkanen is represented at the Gothenburg Museum of Art and Svenska Klubben in Ekenäs, among others.

Tikkanen is also known for his writing. He wrote a series of autobiographical and expository books, including Brändövägen 8, in which he came to terms with his Finnish-Swedish bourgeois background. These books were one of the causes of the Tikkanen-Kihlman debate, which was partly about the negative image of the Finnish-Swedish upper class given by the two authors' self-confessions. As a book author, he published the book Kär i Stockholm in 1955, which he illustrated with types of people, street pictures, restaurant life and architecture from post-war Stockholm.

== Bibliography ==
- Mr. Gogo kommer till Europa. Novel. Helsinki: Söderströms. 1946. OCLC 186733627.
- Satu pojasta, joka sai itse valita onnensa. Porvoo: WSOY. 1951.
- Kär i Stockholm. Helsinki: Söderströms. 1955. OCLC 58123601.
- Bilbiten: Kåserier på fyra hjul. Helsinki: Hufvudstadsbladets Presstjänst. 1956. OCLC 58124338.
- Brinnande ord. Radio play. 1957.
- Ett sommarbarn. Play. 1957.
- Portföljen. Radio play. 1957.
- Paddys land: Irländska skisser. Stockholm: Natur & Kultur. 1957. OCLC 58123691.
- Bedragen. Play. 1958.
- De fega. Play. 1958.
- Missat möte. TV play. 1959.
- Över fjärden är himlen hög. Causeries. Helsinki: Söderströms. 1959. OCLC 186511980.
- Texas. Helsinki: Söderströms. 1960.
- Tili sista droppen. Play. 1960.
- Hjältarna är döda. Novel. Tampere: Söderströms. 1961. OCLC 1073581298.
- Med bil och barn i Jugoslavien. Helsinki: Söderströms. 1961.
- Henrik tiger inte. Causeries. Tampere: Söderströms. 1962.
- Pä väg. TV play. 1962.
- Bröllopsdagen. Play. 1962.
- Buren. Radio play. 1963.
- Den Stora skandalen. Causeries. Tampere: Söderströms. 1963.
- Kring ett fränfälle. Play. 1964.
- Ödlorna. Novel. Tampere: Söderströms. 1965. OCLC 186578890.
- Gapa snällt: Nägra blad ur Noaks arkiv. Causeries. Tampere: Söderströms. 1965.
- På jakt efter etrusker: Strövtåg i det etruskiska landskapet. Helsinki: Söderströms. 1967. OCLC 57940698.
- Försnillaren. Radio play. 1967.
- Jag Borrman. Radio play. 1967.
- Min älskade skärgård. Helsinki: Söderströms. 1968. OCLC 57940669.
- Fyllhunden. Play. 1968.
- Vapenvägraren. Radio play. 1968.
- I Sovjet. Helsinki: Söderströms. 1969. OCLC 816117692.
- Pä botten av tingen. Radio play. 1969.
- Häng med om du kan, älskade. Radio play. 1970.
- Tankstreck. Causeries. Borgå: Söderströms. 1970.
- Mitt Helsingfors. Borgå: Söderströms. 1972. ISBN 9789515200556.
- Dödens Venedig. Borgå: Söderströms. 1973. ISBN 9789515201287.
- Lät oss hata. Radio play. 1973.
- Unohdettu sotilas (in Finnish). Novel. Helsinki: Tammi. 1974.
- Brändövägen 8 Brändö. Tel 35. Novel. Borgå: Söderströms. 1975. ISBN 9789515202932.
- Bävervägen 11 Hertonäs. Novel. Borgå: Söderströms. 1976. ISBN 9789515202932.
- Mariegatan 26 Kronohagen. Novel. Borgå: Söderströms. 1977. ISBN 9789515203984.
- 30-åriga kriget. Novel, on the same theme as Unohdettu sotilas. Juva: Söderströms. 1977. ISBN 9789515204288.
- Ihmisen ääni (in Finnish). Porvoo: WSOY. 1978.
- Fjärilsvingar. Play. 1978.
- Efter hjältedöden. Novel. Borgå: Söderströms. 1979. ISBN 9789515206022.
- TTT. Novel. Borgå: Söderströms. 1979. ISBN 9789515205223.
- Georgsgatan. Novel. Borgå: Söderströms. 1980. ISBN 9789515206589.
- Ansikten och åsikter. Stockholm: Alba. 1980.
- Henriksgatan. Novel. Borgå: Söderströms. 1982. ISBN 9789174585223.
- Ansikten och åsikter. Andra samlingen. Stockholm: Alba. 1981.
- Med ett leende i Toscana. Borgå: Söderströms. 1981.
- Piirroksia katoavasta Suomesta. Bilder. Drawings. Jyväskylä: Extramark. 1981.
- Syndens belöning. Radio play. 1981.
- Renault, mon amour: En autobiografi. Helsinki: Söderströms. 1983. ISBN 9789515208668.

=== Collaborations ===
- Carpelan, Bo; Tikkanen, Henrik (1959). Tadd. Play.
- Carpelan, Bo; Tikkanen, Henrik (1969). Lili. TV play.
- Tikkanen, Henrik; Tikkanen, Märta; Olsoni, Kristin (1970). En enda stor familj. Play.
- Tanttu, Juha; Tikkanen, Henrik (1980). Meidän Helsinki. Keuruu: Otava.
- Kihlman, Christer; Tikkanen, Henrik (1983). De nakna och de saliga. Borgå: Söderströms.

== Reviews ==
- Herdman, John (1980), review of Snob's Island in Cencrastus No. 4, Winter 1981–82, p. 46, ISSN 0264-0856
