= Sofia Zweygberg (company) =

Finnish textile company

Oy Sofia Zweygberg Ab

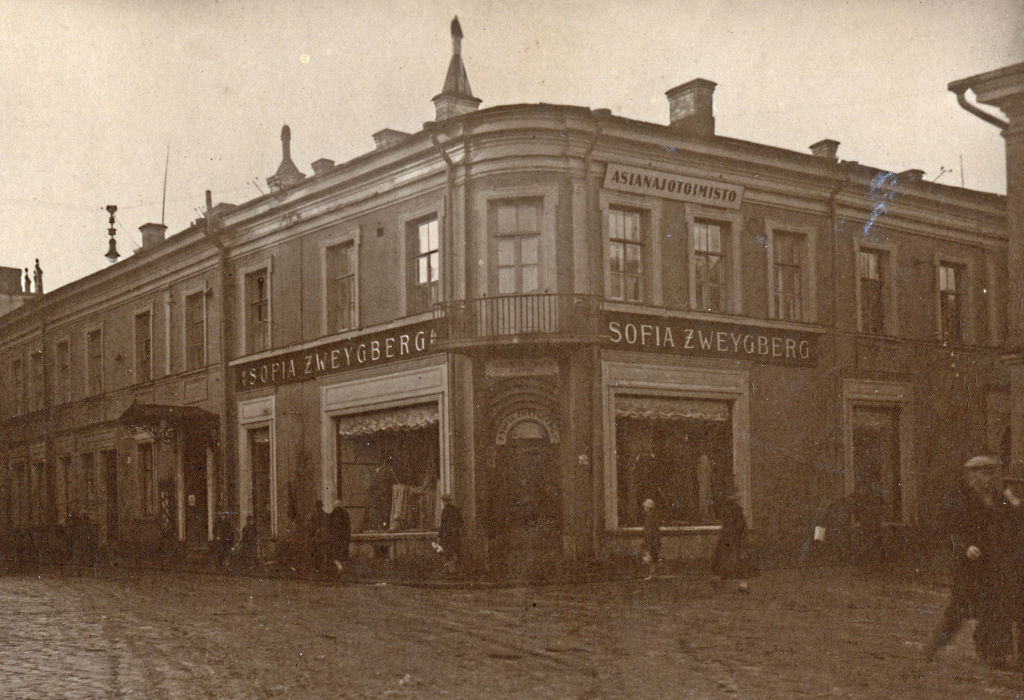
- Type: osakeyhtiö (1913→)
- Industry: textile wholesaler
- Founded: 1868 in Viipuri, Grand Duchy of Finland
- Founder: Sofia Zweygberg
- Defunct: 1970s
- Headquarters: Viipuri, Lappeenranta; Grand Duchy of Finland (→1917); Finland (1917→)

Oy Sofia Zweygberg Ab was a Finnish textile retailer and wholesaler that operated from 1868 until the 1970s.

The company was founded by Sofia Zweygberg in Viipuri, Grand Duchy of Finland. By time it grew the largest of its kind in the country. In the 1920s the company fell into financial problems but overcame the difficulties after effective restructuring.

After the Second World War the head office was moved to Lappeenranta.

== Foundation ==
After Sofia Zweygberg's husband Gustaf Zweygberg had disappeared in Saint Petersburg, she started selling textiles to make her living. She started as retailer of Tampere-produced textiles in Viipuri market hall. The company grew rapidly because she managed the business efficiently; by time the selection grew.

== Growth ==
In 1878 Zweygberg became wholesaler and the company became reputable in Viipuri and whole east Finland; during many years she was the largest seller of cotton products in Finland. The most important area was the Karelian Isthmus due to Russian tourists. One of the most famous products was light blue textile called Sairaanhoitajatar ("nurse").

Zweygberg's daughter Emilia participated in the business since her early years. In 1879 she married Viktor Grönroos. The couple had five children. Following the death of Sofia Zweygberg, Viktor Grönroos took the company leadership. The couple walked together to work and back daily, and shared their work load and responsibilities. The shop became famous and reputable for its good service, which was provided to every customer irrespective to social class. However, due to the contemporary class society, as an established practice peasants visited the shop in mornings and high class during afternoons.

Viktor died in 1909, after which the company was managed by Emilia Grönroos. The wholesaler became limited company Oy Sofia Zweygberg Ab in 1913. The company opened two branches, one of them was in Lappeenranta. Emilia Grönroos led the company until her death in 1916.

== Financial problems ==
Emilia and Viktor Gröönroos's son Veli took the company management, but he fell into alcoholism, failed is job and disappeared somewhere in Germany. His younger brother Heikki, who is described artistically talented and hardworking, became the new manager. However, he fell out through an open window when he was sleepwalking, broke his spine and died one year after the incident.

By the mid 1920s the company had fallen into financial trouble. After the manager died to lightning strike, the company recruited young engineer Wilhelm Wahlforss as new manager in summer 1925. Sofia Zweygberg was in serious problems: in 1924 the balance showed loss by 1.27 million marks with 2.35 million turnover and its payments were frozen. Wahlforss took immediate actions, and after half year the company had managed to get 1.3 million marks open receivables and inventory value was decreased substantially. In December 1925 the company sold its real estate in Viipuri. By the end of the year the debt was reduced from 11.3 million to 3.9 million marks and the balance showed 0.9 million marks' loss. In January 1926 the company sold its shares of Finlayson & Co. Their value had been rated just 220 000 marks on balance sheets but Wahlforss managed to sell them for 1.42 million. In the meantime, the operations were turned profitable, which together with drastically reduced interest costs led to 1.85 million marks' profit in 1926. Wahlforss, however, left the company already in the previous summer, because he regarded that his task was accomplished.

== Later years ==
After the Second World War in Finland ended to Moscow Armistice, Finland had to cede Viipuri to Soviet Union. Oy Sofia Zweygberg Ab moved to Lappeenranta, where it operated until became defunct at the end of the 1970s.
