= Leppävirta =

- Municipality
- Leppävirran kunta Leppävirta kommun
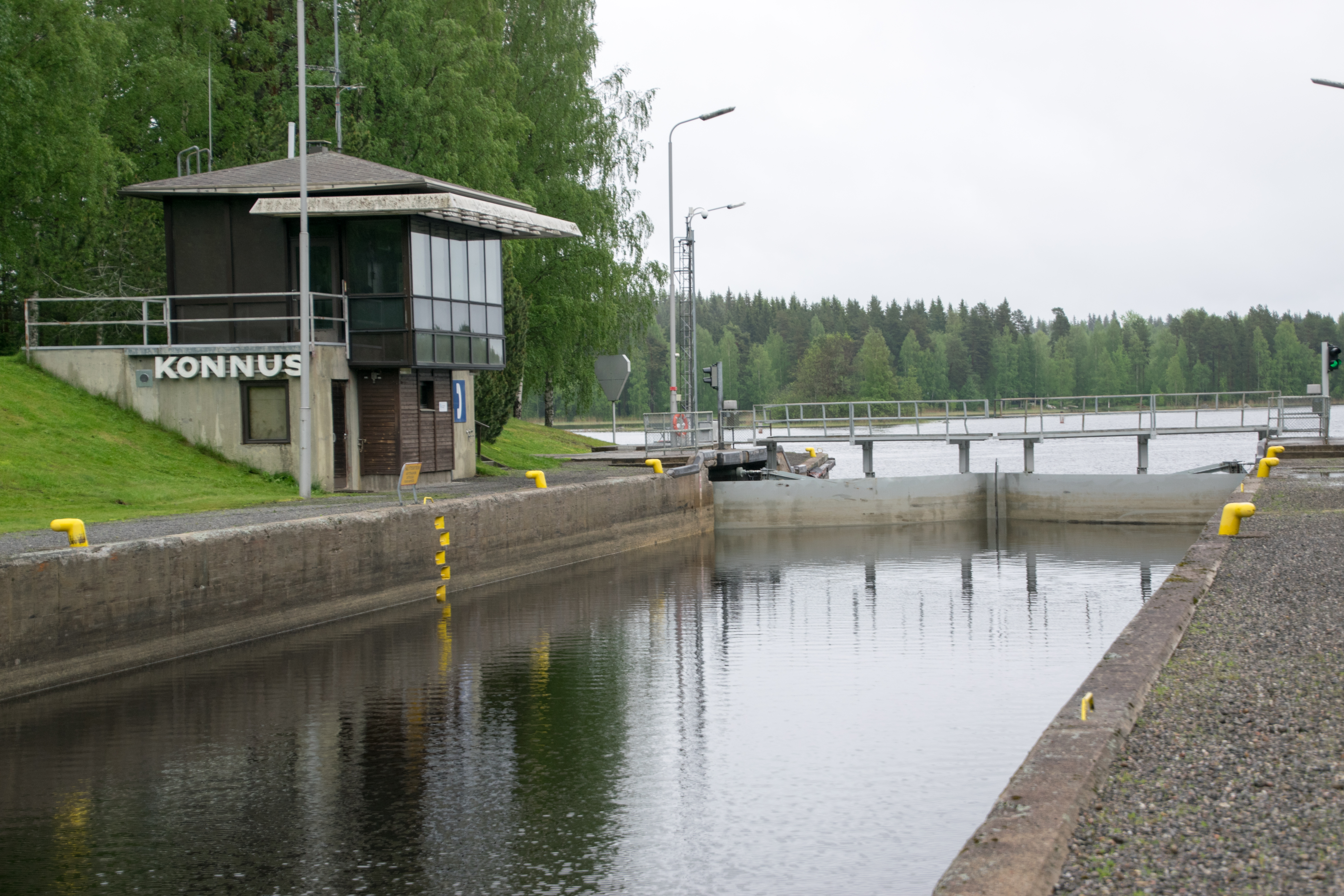
- Konnus channel in Leppävirta

- Coat of arms

- Location of Leppävirta in Finland
- Interactive map of Leppävirta
- Coordinates: 62°30′N 027°47′E
- Country: Finland
- Region: North Savo
- Sub-region: Varkaus
- Charter: 1639

Government
  - Municipal manager: Matti Raatikainen

Area (2018-01-01)
  - Total: 1,519.64 km^{2} (586.74 sq mi)
  - Land: 1,136.26 km^{2} (438.71 sq mi)
  - Water: 383.62 km^{2} (148.12 sq mi)
  - Rank: 68th largest in Finland

Population (2025-12-31)
  - Total: 8,924
  - Rank: 108th largest in Finland
  - Density: 7.85/km^{2} (20.3/sq mi)

Population by native language
  - Finnish: 96.8% (official)
  - Swedish: 0.1%
  - Others: 3.1%

Population by age
  - 0 to 14: 13.3%
  - 15 to 64: 55.1%
  - 65 or older: 31.5%
- Time zone: UTC+02:00 (EET)
  - Summer (DST): UTC+03:00 (EEST)
- Website: leppavirta.fi

Leppävirta (Finnish pronunciation: [ˈlepːæˌʋirtɑ]) is a municipality of Finland. It is located in the North Savo region, 56 kilometres (35 mi) south of Kuopio along the Finnish national road 5. The municipality has a population of 8,924 (31 December 2025) and covers an area of 1,519.64 square kilometres (586.74 sq mi) of which 383.62 km^{2} (148.12 sq mi) is water. The population density is 7.85 inhabitants per square kilometre (20.3/sq mi).

The municipality is unilingually Finnish.

== Geography ==
Neighbour municipalities are Heinävesi, Joroinen, Kuopio, Pieksämäki, Suonenjoki, Tuusniemi and Varkaus.

=== Villages ===
- Sorsakoski
- Häikiä
- Häyry
- Lylymäki
- Niinimäki
- Oravikoski
- Reinikkala
- Saahkarlahti

== Notable people ==
- Jorma Hynninen, opera singer
- Rakel Kansanen, translator
- Helena Kekkonen, peace activist
- Mikko Kuustonen, singer-songwriter
- Pentti Pekkarinen, politician
- Jully Ramsay, historian and genealogist
- Reino Soijärvi, ice hockey player
- Heikki Soisalo, writer
- Kalle Tähtelä, writer, journalist and military aviator
- Adolf Tillaeus, artisan
- Jukka Vesterinen, sportsperson
- Gustaf Wrede, engineer, and business magnate

== International relations ==
Leppävirta is twinned with:

- Storfors in Sweden
- Dovre in Norway
- Schwerte in Germany
- Orissaare in Estonia
