= Leo Wainstein =

Ukrainian jurist and businessman

commercial counsellor Leo Wainstein
- Born: 4 January 1883; Yalta, Russian Empire
- Died: 13 March 1978 (aged 95); Rome, Italy
- Citizenship: Italian
- Education: Jurist
- Alma mater: Odessa University
- Board member of: Ab Nordiska Ullkompaniet Oy (1922–); Turun Verkatehdas Oy (1924–); Oy Silfverbergin & Wecksellin Yhdistetyt Hattutehtaat (1927–1967); Helsinki Jewish Congregation Supervisory Board (1943–1949); Oy M. Kotschack Ab (1955–); Internationale Handelsbank KG; Finnish Jewish Congregation Central Council
- Spouse: Regina née Trilling
- Children: Michael (1920–1991); Lia
- Parent(s): Josef Wainstein and Lia née Rabinowicz
- Awards: commercial counsellor (1938); Commander of the Order of the Lion of Finland; Commander of the Order of Merit of Italy; Knight Grand Cross of the Order of the Crown of Italy; Grand Officer of the Order of the Star of Italian Solidarity; Commander of the Order of the Three Stars of Latvia

Manager of Nordiska Ullkompaniet
- In office 1922–1962

Leo Wainstein (4 January 1883 – 13 March 1978) was a Ukrainian Jewish jurist and businessman who lived most part of his life in Finland.

Wainstein was born in Yalta to a Jewish peasant family. He graduated as a jurist in Odessa University in 1910 and worked in the field until 1916 when he got involved in the wool business through his marriage to Regina née Tilling. After the October Revolution the couple moved to Finland, where Wainstein made a successful career in the textile industry. His business started to decline in the 1950s, and after this, he changed to hat industry for a few years before his retirement.

Wainstein had Italian citizenship, and he died in Rome on 13 March 1978.

== Early life and career in Russian Empire ==
Wainstein was born in Yalta, Russian Empire to a Jewish family. His parents were farmer Josef Wainstein and Lia née Rabinowicz. The father died when Waintein was young and faced had difficulties at completing his studies. Eventually, Wainstein completed his upper secondary studies in 1906 and continued in Odessa University, where he graduated as jurist in 1910.

Following to his graduation, Wainstein worked as jurist first in Odessa and later in Moscow. There he met Regina Trilling, who was a daughter of a Polish Jew wool trader Elias Trilling. Leo and Regina got married in 1915 and in the following year, Leo Wainstein started working for his father-in-law's wool company. Wainstein learned wool business thoroughly and his work took him to the Nordic countries, UK, Belgium, France, Italy and Switzerland.

== Wool manufacturing in Finland ==
Wainstein's wool business came to end after the October Revolution and at late 1918 the couple decided to move to newly independent Finland.

In 1919 Wainstein became owner and manager of wool company Ab Nordiska Ullkompaniet Oy. The Finnish textile industry was in trouble – in addition to the local market, the Finnish companies had sold a large share of their production in Russia, and now this market area was closed. Despite the difficulties, Wainstein developed the business determinedly.

In 1924 Waintein took over Turun Verkatehdas Oy (Turku Baize Factory) from young businessman Wilhelm Wahlforss, who had led the company unsuccessfully. At the time the company employed just 65 people, but Wainstein increased the production capacity of worsted yarn and woolen fabric by 45%, and the number of spindles was increased from 3,400 up to nearly 30,000. Waintein owned a German, Berlin-based subsidiary Nordische Woll GmbH.

The company did well following the Second World War and upswing in the economy, and the headcount in Turun Verkatehdas reached nearly 2,000 in the turn of the 1950s. Soon after this, the situation turned worse: shortly after the company had bought a large stock of wool, the government started wool price regulation. Consequently, the raw material price dropped and the final products had to be priced accordingly. At the early 1950s, the wool price dropped to one-third of the previous peak level, and the company fell into trouble.

Wainstein and the main financing bank Pohjoismaiden Yhdyspankki (PYP) started to seek a way out from the difficult situation. PYP continued funding the Turku baize factory partly because of Wainstein's good relationship to the bank's main director Rainer von Fieandt, and partly because the company collapse would have meant a victory to another local competitor Barker-Littoinen Oy and its financier and Kansallis-Osake-Pankki (KOP), which was the main competitor of PYP. Waintein realised that the future did not look bright, and moved 51% of the company ownership to a foundation he had founded in 1952. The foundation board members were Wainstein, Fieandt and Sakari Tuomioja, the director of Bank of Finland. The setup was tactically selected – after this the company was on a stable basis. Wainstein left his position as chairman in 1953 and Fieandt left in 1955. Turun Verkatehdas was merged to Villayhtymä Oy in 1960.

== Hat business ==
Since the 1920s Wainstein had been involved in hatmaking, being a board member of Oy Silfverbergin & Wecksellin Yhdistetyt Hattutehtaat ("Silfverberg's & Wecksell's United Hat Factories Ltd"). After leaving baize manufacturing, Wainstein got involved into Kristinestad located hat producer Oy M. Kotschack Ab together with his son Michael. Wainstein retired at the end of the 1960s, after which Leo and Regina Wainstein moved to Rome for the rest of their lives; Wainstein had had Italian citizenship since 1919.

== Personal life ==
Wainstein's favourite hobbies were gardening, music, and arts. He was a great friend to Italy and worked as Italian consul in Helsinki in 1919–1923. During 1949–1968 he was Italian Honorary Consul General. Wainstein contributed trade between the two countries as a member of the Finnish–Italian Chamber of Commerce. Wainstein also took part in the Helsinki Jewish Congregation.

== Leo and Regina Wainstein foundation ==
In 1928 Leo and Regina Wainstein founded foundation Leo ja Regina Wainsteinin säätiö to celebrate their tenth anniversary in Finland and as a gratitude to their new home country. The foundation had a significant amount of capital and it shared grants and funded a number of pieces of sculpture in Turku, Helsinki and Gothenburg. The foundation was ended in 2003 after which it became part of the Finnish Cultural Foundation as Leo and Regina Wainstein Fund.
