= Jutta Zilliacus =

Estonian-Finnish journalist and writer (1925–2026)

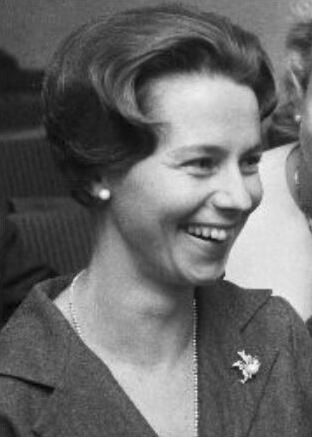
- Zilliacus in 1959

MP for Swedish People's Party
- In office 1975–1987

Member of the Helsinki City Council
- In office 1968–1984

Personal details
- Born: Jutta Armelle Kingo; 25 July 1925 Helsinki, Finland
- Died: 30 May 2026 (aged 100) Helsinki, Finland
- Spouse: Benedict Zilliacus (m. 1949; died 2013)
- Children: Stefan
- Occupation: Journalist and author

Jutta Armelle Zilliacus (25 July 1925 – 30 May 2026) was a Finnish-Estonian journalist and author in the Swedish language. She was also a politician, and served as a member of Parliament for the Swedish People's Party for Helsinki from 1975 to 1987 and a member of the Helsinki City Council from 1968 to 1984.

== Life and career ==
Jutta Zilliacus' parents, piano tuner Johann Kingo and Jenny Gertrud, née Pihlak, were both Estonian refugees from St. Petersburg. Her mother had worked as a chambermaid at the court of the Russian Grand Duchess Victoria Melita. As a child, Jutta Zilliacus spent her summers in Haapsalu, Estonia, and also had Estonian citizenship since birth.

She first went to a Swedish-language public school and then to Deutsche Schule Helsinki in 1933–1944. After graduating in 1944, she studied, among other things, Latin and music at the University of Helsinki 1944–1946 and at the Sibelius Academy 1944–1946.

Besides working as a freelance journalist from 1968 and a politician, Zilliacus also worked as a model, actress and briefly as Mannerheim's secretary.

Jutta Zilliacus horseback riding in 1964.

Zilliacus began her political career as a member of the Helsinki City Council and the City Planning Committee from 1969 to 1984. She was a member of the Swedish People's Party's central board from 1973 to 1983, a member of Parliament from 1975 to 1987, an elector in the presidential elections in 1968, 1977 and 1983, and a political delegate to the UN in 1977 and 1987.

During her political career, Zilliacus worked particularly for gender equality and day care for children.

She married the Swedish-speaking Finnish writer Benedict Zilliacus in 1949, who died in 2013, and had a son.

Zilliacus spoke Swedish, Finnish, German, French, Estonian and English.

Zilliacus also appeared in a handful of feature films under the stage name Jutta Armela, and in the series Matti ja Leena in the 1960s under her regular name.

Zilliacus turned 100 on 25 July 2025, and died in Helsinki on 30 May 2026.

== Books ==
- Rökringar (1970)
- Innan du vet ordet av (1975)
- En bit av Det stora äpplet (1978)
- Vägskäl (1986)
- Annorlunda barndom (1986)
- Vändpunkt (1987)
- Gå över gränser (1991)
- Balansgång (1994)
- Ajatuksia verannalla (1997)
- Underbart är kort (1997)
- I väntan på buss nummer 16 (2002)
