= Reino Soijärvi =

Finnish ice hockey forward

- Born: October 30, 1975 (age 49); Leppävirta, Finland
- Height: 5 ft 11 in (180 cm)
- Weight: 179 lb (81 kg; 12 st 11 lb)
- Position: Forward
- Shot: Right
- Played for: KooKoo
- Playing career: 1994–2006

Reino Soijärvi (born October 30, 1975) is a Finnish former ice hockey forward.

Soijärvi played in the Finnish lower leagues for Warkis, SaPKo and IPK before joining KooKoo of Mestis in 2000. He would play the next six seasons with KooKoo, playing 277 games and scoring 91 goals and 79 assists before retiring in 2006.
