= WSOY =

WSOY may refer to:

- Werner Söderström Osakeyhtiö, a Finnish publishing company founded in 1878, now part of Bonnier Group.
- WSOY (AM), a radio station (1340 AM) licensed to Decatur, Illinois, United States
- WSOY-FM, a radio station (102.9 FM) licensed to Decatur, Illinois, United States
