= Manrape =

1975 novel by Märta Tikkanen

- First edition
- Author: Märta Tikkanen
- Original title: Män kan inte våldtas
- Language: Swedish
- Published: 1975
- Publication place: Finland

Manrape (Swedish: Män kan inte våldtas, lit. 'Men Can't Be Raped') is a 1975 novel by Swedish-speaking Finnish writer Märta Tikkanen. The book launched Tikkanen's career and placed her in the centre of an ongoing debate about gender roles in the Nordic countries.

In the novel, a man rapes forty-year-old Tova, who resolves to rape him in revenge.

The book was made into the 1978 film Men Can't Be Raped, directed by Jörn Donner.
