= Märta Tikkanen =

Finland Swedish writer (born 1935)

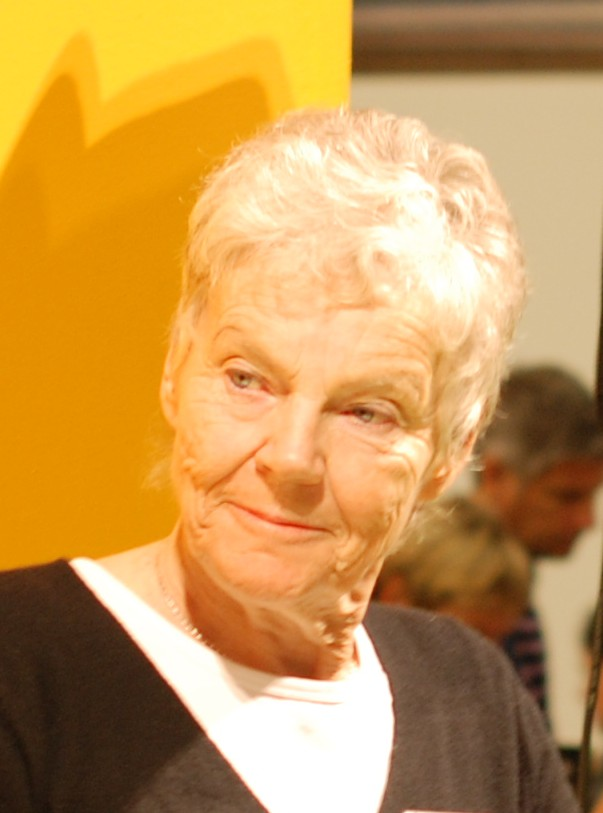
- Tikkanen at the Göteborg Book Fair 2010
- Born: 3 April 1935 (age 91); Helsinki, Finland
- Education: University of Helsinki (M.A., 1958)
- Occupation: Author
- Spouse(s): Leif Ginman (m. 1958; div. 1962) Henrik Tikkanen (m. 1963; died 1984)

Märta Eleonora Tikkanen (née Cavonius; born 3 April 1935) is a Swedish-speaking Finnish writer.

== Biography ==
Märta Cavonius was born on 3 April 1935 in Helsinki. Her parents were professor Gösta Cavonius and Margit Stadius. She graduated from the high school Svenska flicklyceet i Helsingfors in 1953.

She worked as a reporter for Hufvudstadsbladet from 1956 to 1961. She graduated from the University of Helsinki, Master of Arts in 1958 and received a Master of Philosophy in 1961. After her time as a reporter, Tikkanen worked as a Swedish language teacher at Drumsö svenska samskola from 1961 to 1966 and was the rector of the Swedish Adult Education Centre in Helsinki (Helsingfors svenska arbetarinstitut) from 1972 to 1980. She was also a columnist for Ilta-Sanomat from 1972 to 1974 and Aftonbladet from 1978 to 1979, and served on the board of the writers' centre Författarcentrum from 1972 to 1974.

Tikkanen was married to writer Henrik Tikkanen. A film based on her book Manrape (Män kan inte våldtas, "Men Can't Be Raped"), directed by Jörn Donner, was released in 1978.

Her first marriage was to Leif Ginman from 1958 to 1962. She was married to Henrik Tikkanen from 1963 until his death in 1984.

She won the Moa Award in 2020.

== Bibliography ==
- Eller vad tycker ni? (1970)
- Nu imorron (1970)
- Ingenmansland (1972)
- Vem bryr sig om Doris Mihailov (1974)
- Män kan inte våldtas (1975)
- Århundradets kärlekssaga (1978)
- Mörkret som ger glädjen djup (1981)
- Sofias egen bok (1982)
- Rödluvan (1986)
- Storfångaren (1989)
- Arnaía kastad i havet (1992)
- Bryta mot lagen (1992)
- Personliga angelägenheter (1996)
- Sofia vuxen med sitt MBD (1998)
- Två (2004)
- Emma & Uno - visst var det kärlek (2010)

== Prizes ==
- Prize from the Society of Swedish Literature in Finland (1973, 1979)
- Längman Prize (1974)
- Nordic Women's Alternative Literature Prize (1979)
- Finnish Bookseller's Thank You For the Book Prize (1979)
- Finland's State Prize for the Dissemination of Knowledge (1983)
- Swedish literary De Nios Grand Prize (1999)
- Swedish Academy's Finland Prize (2002)
- Finland's State Literary Prize (2011)
- Moa Award (2020)
