= Benedict Zilliacus =

Finnish journalist and author (1921–2013)

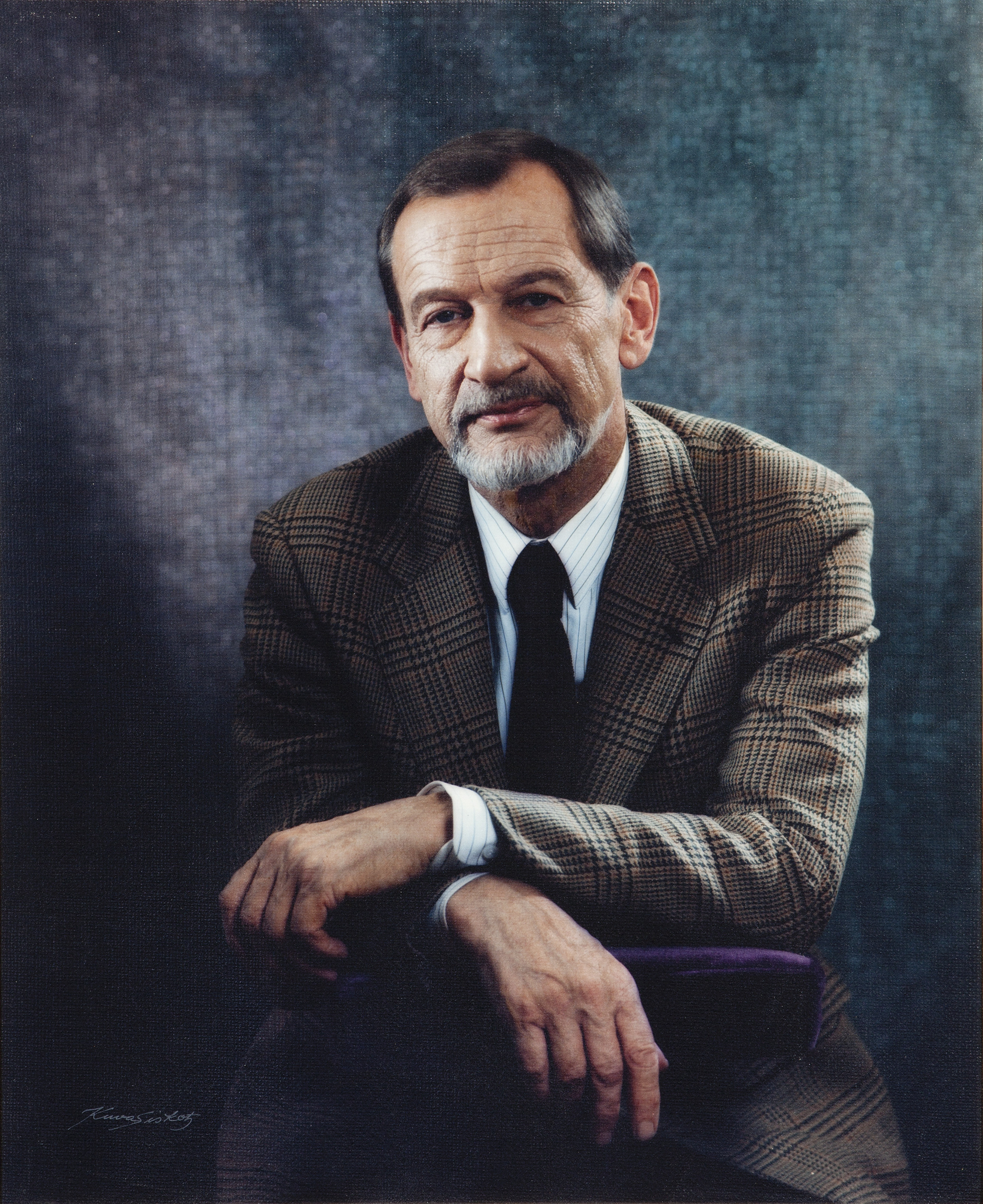
- Born: Emil Benedict Zilliacus; January 11, 1921; Helsinki, Finland
- Died: January 28, 2013 (aged 92); Helsinki, Finland
- Other name: Bez
- Occupations: Author, scriptwriter, journalist and translator
- Spouse: Jutta Zilliacus (m. 1949)
- Children: 1 son
- Parents: Emil Zilliacus; Ingrid Wegelius

Emil Benedict Zilliacus (January 11, 1921 – January 28, 2013) was a Swedish-speaking Finnish journalist, author, scriptwriter and translator.

Zilliacus was born in Helsinki, Finland. He graduated from Svenska normallyceum i Helsingfors in 1939 and studied at the University of Helsinki from 1945 to 1948. From 1948 to 1982, he worked as a journalist and columnist for the newspaper Hufvudstadsbladet.

In the 1950s and 1960s, he wrote a revue for the Swedish theater Lilla Teatern in Helsinki every other year, or sometimes more often; the show became very popular. In addition to revues, he also wrote plays and musicals, and his books dealt with subjects including industrial arts, Helsinki, and the archipelago.

He was a board member of the Finland's Swedish Dramatists' Association (Finlands svenska dramatikerförbund) from 1965 to 1969. He wrote screenplays for many movies, including Etulinjan edessä (Beyond the Front Line), which he wrote together with Stefan Forss, and Tali-Ihantala, which he wrote with Stefan Forss and Esko Salervo.

== Bibliography ==
- Tom-Tom och djuren (1950, with illustrations by Henrik Tikkanen)
- Bilderbok för stora barn (1951, with illustrations by Henrik Tikkanen)
- Vi ser på Helsingfors (1952, with drawings by Henrik Tikkanen)
- Finnish designers (1954)
- Uppåt väggarna (1955–57, revue)
- Lite i rödluvan (1956–57, revue)
- Nukkumatti (1957–58, revue)
- Rollen Peter Berg (1958–59, revue)
- Ö (1958–59, revue)
- My Fair Lad (1959–60, revue)
- Mera i rödluvan (1960–61, revue)
- Konsthantverk och konstindustri i Norden (1961, editor with H.O. Gummerus)
- Säteri. Valkeakoski, Suomi (1961, text by Zilliacus, photographs by Jörgen Vorberg)
- Guldbröllop (1961–62, revue)
- Korsetten (1962, graphic design by Timo Sarpaneva)
- Ättan (1964, revue)
- Ro, ro (1966–67, revue, with Erna Tauro and Vivica Bandler)
- Wärtsilä (1967)
- Sex årtionden i pressbilder (1971) (with Hugo Sundström)
- Helsinki elää. Helsingfors lever (1971, photographs by Volker von Bonin)
- Utöar (1975, drawings by Henrik Tikkanen)
- Öar, holmar och skär (1977, with Matti Hälli and Stig Jaatinen)
- 100 klipp ur vår dagbok (1977, with Per-Olof Nyström)
- Stadin kundi (1979, revue, with Håkan Pörtfors)
- Wihelm Wahlforss (1984)
- Bergets skugga (1987)
- Båten i vassen (1990)
- Förlorat och bevarat (1996)

=== Translations into Swedish ===
- Kärlek är en förväxling (1966) by Lotte Ingrisch
- Don Juan, or the Love of Geometry (Don Juan eller kärleken till geometrin, 1968) by Max Frisch
- Skiss av ett olycksfall (1975) by Max Frisch
- Weisman und Rotgesicht (Weisman och Rödskinnet, 1979) by George Tabori
- An essay in Otium sapientis. Essäer om böcker och bibliotek (1980) by Eino Nivanka

== Awards ==
- Prize from the Society of Swedish Literature in Finland in 1964 and 1975
- The Thanks for the Book Award 1991
