= Joroinen =

Joroinen Jorois
- Municipality
- Joroisten kunta Jorois kommun
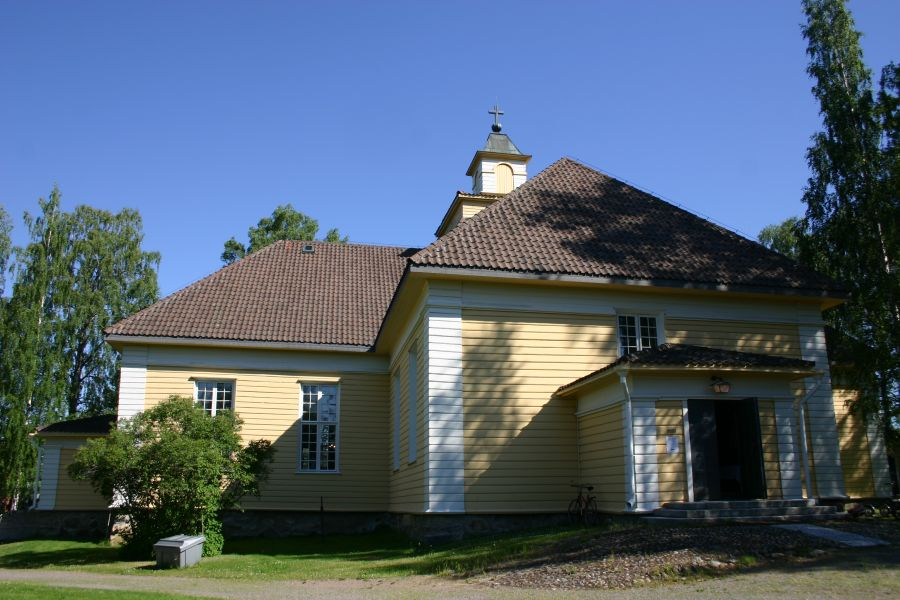
- Joroinen church

- Coat of arms
- Nickname: Paris of the Savonia
- Location of Joroinen in Finland
- Interactive map of Joroinen
- Coordinates: 62°11′N 027°50′E
- Country: Finland
- Region: North Savo
- Sub-region: Varkaus
- Charter: 1631

Government
  - Municipality manager: Jaakko Kuronen

Area (2018-01-01)
  - Total: 711.76 km^{2} (274.81 sq mi)
  - Land: 574.89 km^{2} (221.97 sq mi)
  - Water: 136.3 km^{2} (52.6 sq mi)
  - Rank: 148th largest in Finland

Population (2025-12-31)
  - Total: 4,494
  - Rank: 178th largest in Finland
  - Density: 7.82/km^{2} (20.3/sq mi)

Population by native language
  - Finnish: 91.9% (official)
  - Swedish: 0.4%
  - Others: 7.7%

Population by age
  - 0 to 14: 13.4%
  - 15 to 64: 55.5%
  - 65 or older: 31.2%
- Time zone: UTC+02:00 (EET)
  - Summer (DST): UTC+03:00 (EEST)
- Website: www.joroinen.fi

Joroinen (Finnish: [ˈjoroi̯nen]; Swedish: Jorois) is a municipality in the North Savo region of Finland. The municipality has a population of approximately 4,626 people and covers an area of 982 square kilometers.

The bull's head on the coat of arms refers to the municipality's position in the development of agriculture in the 19th century, as Joroinen was home to a dairy and livestock school and the first livestock breeding association in Eastern Finland, and the round shots around the bull's head reminds the ancient location of the parish near the historical Swedish-Russian border and the battles fought there. The coat of arms was designed by Olof Eriksson and was adopted on June 12, 1953.

Joroinen's signature dish is kapapaisti made from dried fish and pork, but in the 1980s, a potato casserole containing vendace was also named the traditional parish dish of Joroinen. At the Finnish Sports Gala, Joroinen was awarded as the 2021 most mobile municipality in Finland.

== Some villages ==
- Joroisniemi
- Järvikylä
- Kaitainen
- Katajamäki
- Katisenlahti
- Kerisalo
- Kerisalonsaari
- Kiekka
- Kotkatlahti
- Kurkela
- Kuvansi
- Koskenkylä
- Lahnalahti
- Maavesi
- Montola
- Ruokojärvi
- Ruokoniemi
- Savuniemi
- Tahkoranta

== Historic manor houses of the area ==
- Frugård
- Hoviniemi
- Joroisniemi, Braseborg
- Juhanala
- Järvikylä
- Karhulahti
- Korhola
- Koskenhovi
- Kotkanhovi
- Paajala, Örnevik
- Pasala
- Puomila
- Räisälänranta
- Stendal
- Torstila
- Tuomaala
- Virrantalo
- Vättilä

== Notable people ==
- Jukka Hentunen (born 1974), ice hockey player
- A. A. Kannisto (1876–1930), trade unionist and politician
- Erkki Pulliainen (1938–2022), biologist and politician

== International relations ==
=== Twin towns — sister cities ===
Joroinen is twinned with:

- Ülenurme, Estonia
