= Tankmar Horn =

Minister Tankmar Horn
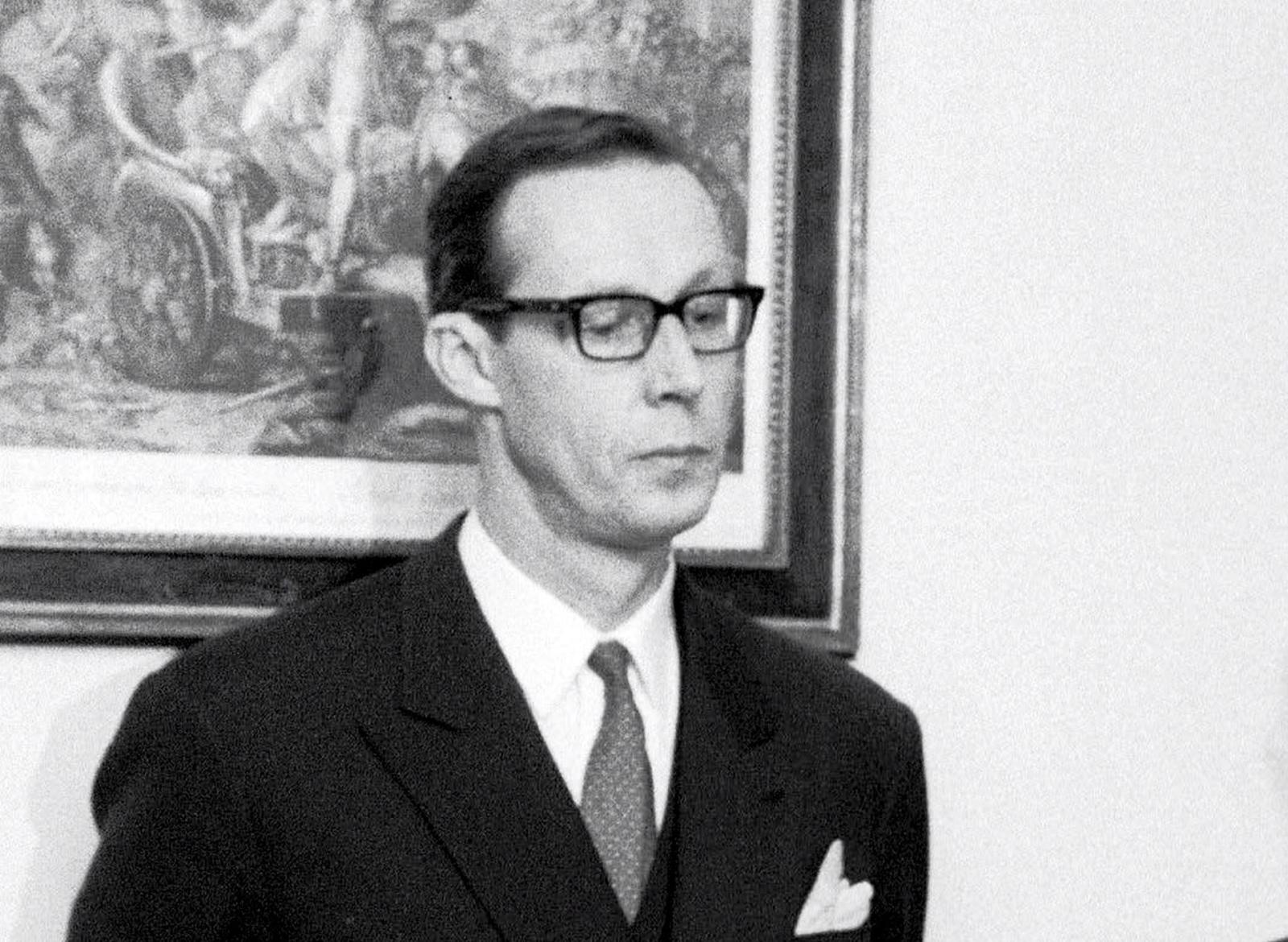
- 1965
- Born: 16 August 1924; Viipuri, Finland
- Died: 16 March 2018 (aged 93); Helsinki, Finland
- Education: MEcon
- Board member of: Finnish Foreign Trade Federation (1971–1974); Export Education Association (1971–1975); Finnish Industry Federation (1972–1974); Industry Central Association (1975–1986); Oy Wärtsilä Ab (1978–1991); Oy Kaukas Ab (1982–1986); Finnish–Soviet Chamber of Commerce (1987–1991); Oy Metra Ab (1991–1995); Effoa; Keskus-Sato; Kymmene Oy; Ovako; Rautaruukki; Suomen Petrooli; Union Bank of Finland; Finnish Export Credit; International Chamber of Commerce, Finnish division; Engineering Industry Central Association; Finnish Fair; Order of the White Rose of Finland; Order of the Lion of Finland
- Spouses: 1949–1971: Kaija Maire née Virvavaara; 1972—2018: Kristina Louise née Laxström
- Parent(s): Walter Emil Waldemar Horn; Zelia Anita née Buttenhoff
- Awards: Commander Grand Cross of the Order of the Lion of Finland; Commander of the White Rose of Finland; Grand Cross of St. Olav (Norway); Counsellor (1963); Minister (1972); Honorary Doctor in Economics (1989)

Manager of Wärtsilä
- In office 1 January 1971 – 1978 (1987)
- Preceded by: Bertel Långhjelm
- Succeeded by: Tor Stolpe

Tankmar Horn (16 August 1924 – 16 March 2018) was a Finnish diplomat, economist, and businessman.

Due to his father's position as army officer, Horn lived in different places in his youth. During the Second World War he studied in Berlin and Hungary. After the war end he completed his studies in economics and subsequently he started working for the Finnish Ministry of Foreign Affairs.

Horn spent a couple of year long periods of secondment in a number of countries. He ended up negotiating trade agreements with EEC and he also took part in Nordek negotiations which eventually failed.

In 1969 Horn got managerial position in multi industrial company Wärtsilä and in the beginning of 1971 he became the managing director. During Horn's era the company internationalised through acquisitions and opening sales offices in many countries. The most significant investment was building entirely new Perno shipyard in Turku. After stepping aside from the company leadership Horn continued as board member. A dramatic event during his membership was the bankruptcy of Wärtsilä Marine, that took place in 1989.

== Early years and studies ==
Horn's parents were officer Walter Horn and Zelia née Buttenhof. He was born and lived his childhood in Viipuri, where his father was positioned. The family followed Walter Horn when he was later ordered to Helsinki and for period 1940–1944 to Berlin as military attaché. Horn did his matriculation exam in 1943 and in 1943–1944 he studied in Hungary. For 1944–1945 he got an office job in the Finnish embassy in Stockholm. In 1947 Horn studied in Spain and in the following year he got his diploma in economics. In the same year he first worked as secretary in the Finnish Foreign Trade Federation until he got a position in the Finnish Ministry of Foreign Affairs. Beside his work, Horn continued his studies and in 1951 he graduated Bachelor of Economics, and in 1953 he did his master's degree.

== Career as official ==
The Ministry of Foreign Affairs sent him to Warsaw for 1953–1955 and to Washington, D.C. for 1955–1957. In 1957–1960 Horn was department secretary and acting department manager. During 1960–1961 Horn was positioned in Buenos Aires and in 1961–1963 in Geneva. Horn worked as department deputy director in 1963–1965 and ministerial adviser in 1966. He was the trade political department manager in 1967–1969.

As a high-profile department manager, Horn could act relatively independently reporting directly to Minister of Foreign Affairs Ahti Karjalainen and President Urho Kekkonen. Horn had a role at building relationships with OECD and EEC; in the meantime he had to maintain relationships with Soviet Union, which observed suspicious Finland establishing connections to West-European market. Horn had his hand in negotiations for significant contracts for electric locomotives and nuclear power plants with Soviet Union.

Horn also took part in planning Nordek, a joint Nordic project for an own economic community, which eventually failed. Prime Minister Mauno Koivisto led the negotiations, and during the process there came dissensions between him and Horn; this had a long-term effect on their mutual relationships.

== Wärtsilä ==
Already during the Nordek negotiations, Horn was recruited to a leading position in the multi industrial company Oy Wärtsilä Ab. At first he worked as deputy director in 1969–1970, and in the beginning of year 1971 he followed Bertel Långhjelm as managing director.

Back then, the company structure was such as its long-term manager Wilhelm Wahlforss had built it: the key sites were shipyards in Turku and Helsinki, and in addition, the company produced locks, paper machines, agricultural machinery and dishware from glass and porcelain. The old industrial giant faced pressures to modernise itself.

Wärtsilä had opened a new facility for paper machine production in Järvenpää in 1970 and moving of operations was on-going when Horn started his directorship.

When Horn started as manager, a previously prepared plan of building a new shipyard in Turku was launched as a project. Construction of Perno shipyard was started on 16 May 1974. The first stage of construction comprised dry dock, 600-tonne bridge crane, workshops and other buildings. Operation were gradually moved from the old Turku yard to the new facility and the yard reached full production ability in 1979.

During Horn's era Wärtsilä started to internationalise increasingly. Wärtsilä-owned porcelain producer Arabia merged with the Swedish Rörstrand, after which Wärtsilä took control of the entire share capital. Wärtsilä also acquired the Swedish sanitary porcelain producer IDO and diesel engine business from NOHAB. The company built a diesel engine factory in Singapore and opened many branches in a number of countries. By gaining ownership of Appleton works in the United States in 1983, Wärtsilä got a foothold in the North American paper machine business. Wärtsilä became enlisted on Stockholm and London stock exchange markets.

The company structure was changed in small steps during Horn's leadership. His previous experience in foreign affairs proved useful when Wärtsilä negotiated about icebreaker deliveries to Soviet Union. In 1978 Wärtsilä changed to system of two managers; Horn focused high-level management and public relations, and the operative management was given to Tor Stolpe. The arrangement worked well in Wärtsilä and was kept until Horn's retirement in 1987.

Shortly before leaving his post, Horn participated in a large-scale ownership arrangement between Wärtsilä and Valmet. Wärtsilä sold its paper machine production to Valmet, and shipyards of both companies were put under one company, Wärtsilä Marine, from which Wärtsilä's share was 70%. Wärtsilä Marine fell in a scandalous bankruptcy in 1989. Horn was chairman of board in Wärtsilä until it merged with Oy Lohja Ab. He continued still for a few years as board member of the succeeding Metra company.

During his Wärtsilä leadership Horn held positions of trust in employers' associations. His strength was a good relationship with president Urho Kekkonen, whom he consulted in trade political questions. Due to his statements regarding oil crisis, he went to disputes with the Neste manager Uolevi Raade. Horn took part in forming Finnish Business and Policy Forum EVA and in the 1980s he was member of board also in other Finnish industrial companies.
