= Tor Stolpe =

Finnish businessman

vuorineuvos Tor Björn Stolpe
- Born: 25 April 1927; Hämeenlinna, Finland
- Died: 10 December 2011 (aged 84)
- Education: University of Helsinki
- Political party: SFP
- Board member of: see → Board memberships
- Spouse: 1950→: Susanne née Palmberg
- Parent(s): Nils Thorfinn Stolpe and Greta Lisa née Mether-Borgström
- Awards: vuorineuvos (1981); First Class Knight of the White Rose of Finland

Manager of Wärtsilä
- In office 1978 (1987) – 1989
- Preceded by: Tankmar Horn
- Succeeded by: Pekka Laine

Tor Björn Stolpe (25 April 1927 – 10 December 2011) was a Finnish businessman and vuorineuvos.

Stolpe was born in Hämeenlinna and completed his gymnasium in Kotka. He studied Master of Arts in University of Helsinki. After his graduation, he worked the following fourteen years in managerial positions for metal processor Oy Vuoksenniska Ab first as ore mine director and later in the head office. During 1968–1976 Stolpe worked as manager in Kymin Oy engineering industry division.

Stolpe became division manager in Wärtsilä in 1976 and in 1978 he became the company director of operations. During period of dual leadership in 1978–1987 he managed Wärtsilä together with Tankmar Horn, after which he became managing director. Stolpe left his position in 1989 – in the same year when the company subsidiary Wärtsilä Marine fell in bankruptcy.

== Early years and studies ==
Stolpe was born in Hämeenlinna, where his father Nils Stolpe served as military officer. He moved many times during his childhood, but the most part of it he spent in Mustila, Elimäki. Stople was interested in nature, literature and history.

Stolpe graduated from Kotka Swedish Coeducational School in 1945. He continued his studies in University of Helsinki, where he took actively part in student activities. In 1948 he was elected the secretary of the Swedish-speaking coalition of nations. Stolpe was selected board chairman of the Helsinki University Student Union in 1953; he was the first Swedish-speaking Finn in the position after a period of over 40 years. Stolpe graduated as Master of Arts in 1954.

== Vuoksenniska ==
After completing his studies, Stolpe started as geologist in Oy Vuoksenniska Ab and for the following five years he surveyed ore deposits in Nyhamn, Åland and Jussarö, Ekenäs. The examinations led to foundation of an ore mine in Jussarö; Stolpe was appointed the local director in 1959. The initial target for annual production was 300,000 tonnes of iron ore; however, the downward price trend of steel combined with introduction of large intercontinental bulk carriers led to decline of producer prices and eventually running down the mine. Stolpe got a new position as administrative department manager in Vuoksenniska headquarter in Helsinki in 1966. He left the company after fourteen years of service in 1968.

== Högfors works ==
In 1968 Stolpe became manager of Kymin Oy Högfors works, and in 1970 he became manager of the company engineering industry division. The Högfors works' main products were enamelled bathtubs, but the portfolio moved gradually make-to-print products delivered to vehicle industry. The bathtub production collapsed during the oil crisis of the 1970s when the government prohibited them from new state funded rental houses, in order to save energy. Subsequently, the Högfors works fell into trouble.

== Wärtsilä ==
Tankmar Horn, the manager of multi industrial company Wärtsilä, restructured the company by dividing it to six different divisions by industry. In 1976 Stolpe was appointed manager of Industrial Division I. In 1978 Stolpe followed Horn as operating manager; Horn himself focused on public relations.

During Stolpe's leadership the head office was moved from Sörnäinen to Siltasaari in Helsinki. The company reached to international market; Wärtsilä took over diesel engine production of Swedish NOHAB in 1978 and was enlisted into Stockholm stock exchange in 1983. One year later Wärtsilä was enlisted into London Stock Exchange, as the first Finnish company.

In 1987, following retirement of Tankmar Horn, Stolpe became the company main director. In the beginning of the same year Wärtsilä and Valmet shipyards were put under one organisation, Wärtsilä Marine. As a part of arrangement of the ownership, Wärtsilä paper machine production was transferred to Valmet. Since the beginning Wärtsilä Marine created massive losses and Stolpe left his position as Wärtsilä Marine chairman in autumn 1989 just some months before it fell in a scandalous bankruptcy in the following October. He left also his position as the parent company manager.

== Political career ==
Stolpe was member of SFP. During 1963–1965 he was member of Ekenäs town board. He was member of town council in 1965.

== Board memberships ==
- Taimistoviljelijät–Planskoleodlarna ry (1951–1954)
- Helsinki University Student Union (1953)
- West-Uusimaa Commerce Chamber Federation (1960–1966)
- Suomen vuorimiesyhdistys – Finlands bergmannaföreningen r.y. (1963–)
- Finnish HVAC Central Association (1968–1973)
- Oy Romurauta Ab (1969–1974)
- Oy Aerator Ab (1969–1976)
- Kymmene Försäljnings Ab (1970–1976)
- Co-operative Metex (1970–1976)
- Kymi Kymmene Oy (1971–1976)
- Kymmene Engineering Ltd (1973–1976)
- Finnish Engineering Industry Federation (1974–1976)
- Finnish Engineering Industry Employers' Association (1974–)
- Finnish Employers' Central Association (1975–1979)
- Unemployment fund central fund (1975–)
- Foundry purchasing co-operative (1975–1976)
- Oy Uusi Suomi (1976–1977; 1985–)
- NOHAB Diesel Ab (1979–1983)
- Oy Ovako Ab (1979–)
- IFÖ AB (1982)
- Finnish-American Chamber of Commerce (1982)
- Technical Panel (1982–)
- TrioVing A/S (1984)
- Helsinki Stock Exchange (1984–)
- Oy Wärtsilä Ab (1984–)
- Oy Volvo-auto Ab (1983–)
- Wärtsilä Marine (1987–1989)
- Institut supérieur européen d'administration des affaires, Finnish advisory board
