= Vartia =

Vartia is a Finnish surname. Notable people with the surname include:

- Ilmari Vartia (1914–1951), Finnish fencer
- Raimo Vartia (1937–2018), Finnish basketball player
- Taavi Vartia (born 1965), Finnish film director, screenwriter, and writer
- Yrjö Vartia (born 1946), Finnish economist
