= Teräsvirta =

Teräsvirta is a Finnish surname. Notable people with the surname include:

- Einari Teräsvirta (1914–1995), Finnish gymnast and architect
- Timo Teräsvirta (born 1941), Finnish economist
