= Yrjö =

Yrjö, a masculine Finnish given name that is the equivalent of George, may refer to:

- Yrjö von Grönhagen (1911–2003), Finnish anthropologist
- Yrjö Jylhä (1903–1956), Finnish poet
- Yrjö Kilpinen (1892–1959), Finnish composer
- Yrjö Kokko (1903–1977), Finnish author
- Yrjö Kukkapuro (1933–2025), Finnish interior architect and furniture designer
- Yrjö Lindegren (1900–1952), Finnish architect
- Yrjö Mäkelin (1875–1923), shoemaker
- Yrjö Nikkanen (1914–1985), Finnish athlete
- Yrjö Sakari Yrjö-Koskinen (1830–1903), freiherr, senator, professor, historian, and politician
- Yrjö Sirola (1876–1936), Finnish writer and socialist politician
- Yrjö Sotamaa, Finnish architect
- Yrjö Väisälä (1891–1971), Finnish astronomer and physicist
- Yrjö Vartia (born 1946), economist
- Yrjö Wichmann (1868–1932), Finnish linguist

== See also ==
- George (given name)
