= Erik Törnqvist =

Finnish civil servant and diplomat

Erik Olof Törnqvist (20 July 1915 – 23 October 2001) was a Finnish civil servant and diplomat.

Törnqvist was born in Alahärmä. He graduated from high school in 1933 and as a bachelor of political science in 1937.

Törnqvist began his career as actuary at the Finnish National Board of Customs from 1939 to 1940, then he was a researcher at the Bank of Finland from 1940 to 1942, Secretary of the price council at the Ministry of Supply 1942–1945, Secretary of the Economic Council 1946–1947, Member of the Delegation for the War reparations Industry 1946–1948 and Economic Counselor 1947–1949.

While in 1949–1972 he was the head of the Economics Department of the Ministry of Finance, he had several important positions at first in Finland, Secretary General of the Economic Policy Planning Council 1951–1953, Secretary of the Prime Minister 1953–1954, President of the Finnish Group in the 1956–1957 Nordic Committee of Economy, UNECE Division Chief Geneva 1957–1959, United Nations Latin America and the Caribbean Economic Commission, Santiago de Chile, 1959–1961, UNTAB expert in Colombia 1962–1963, chairman of the Nordek delegation 1968–1970, member of the World Bank Executive Board in Washington, 1970–1972, and career Ambassador to Mexico and Cuba from 1973 to 1978. He died in Helsinki, aged 86.

Erik Törnqvist’s brother was professor of statistics Leo Törnqvist.
