= Yrjö Vartia =

Yrjö O. Vartia (born June 3, 1946 in Helsinki, Finland) is an emeritus professor of econometrics in the Department of Political and Economic Studies at the University of Helsinki, Finland.

== Career ==
He received his B.S. (mathematics) in 1968 and his M.A. (statistics) in 1971 from the University of Helsinki and Licentiate of Philosophy and Ph.D. (statistics) from the University of Tampere, Finland in 1976. He became associate professor of statistics at the University of Helsinki in 1980, Professor of Statistics at the Helsinki School of Economics HSE in 1984 and professor of Economics (focusing on econometrics) at the University of Helsinki in 1987. He was student of Leo Törnqvist, the creator of the Törnqvist index

== Research on Index Numbers ==
Vartia is best known for his 1983 paper in Econometrica, Efficient Methods of Measuring Welfare Change and Compensated Income in Terms of Ordinary Demand Functions. It explains a numerical technique for solving a system of demand equations to derive the underlying utility function, i.e. for "calculating exact consumer welfare assuming the consumer faces a linear budget constraint". This is important because it greatly facilitates the measurement of changes in welfare, a major part of the work of economists.

More generally, Vartia's expertise is axiomatic index numbers, where he is known for his "consistency in aggregation" test and his discovery, along with Kazuo Sato of the "ideal log-change index", which utilised logarithms and logarithmic mean to define the Sato-Vartia or "Vartia II" index (both 1976). He proposed also in his dissertation "Relative Changes and Index Numbers" in 1976 another index known as Montgomery-Vartia (or "Vartia I") index, which satisfies Time and Factor Reversal Tests and is Consistent in Aggregation. But it satisfies only a weaker form of Proportionality Test WPT along with, say, the factor antithesis FA(Törnqvist) of the Törnqvist index. According to WPT, if both prices and quantities change proportionally, the price index must equal the common factor of proportionality. Montgomery-Vartia index was proposed independently in another notation by Montgomery in 1937. Both Sato-Vartia and Montgomery-Vartia indices are modifications and refinements of the Törnqvist index.
