= Viking Cinderella =

Cruiseferry built in 1989

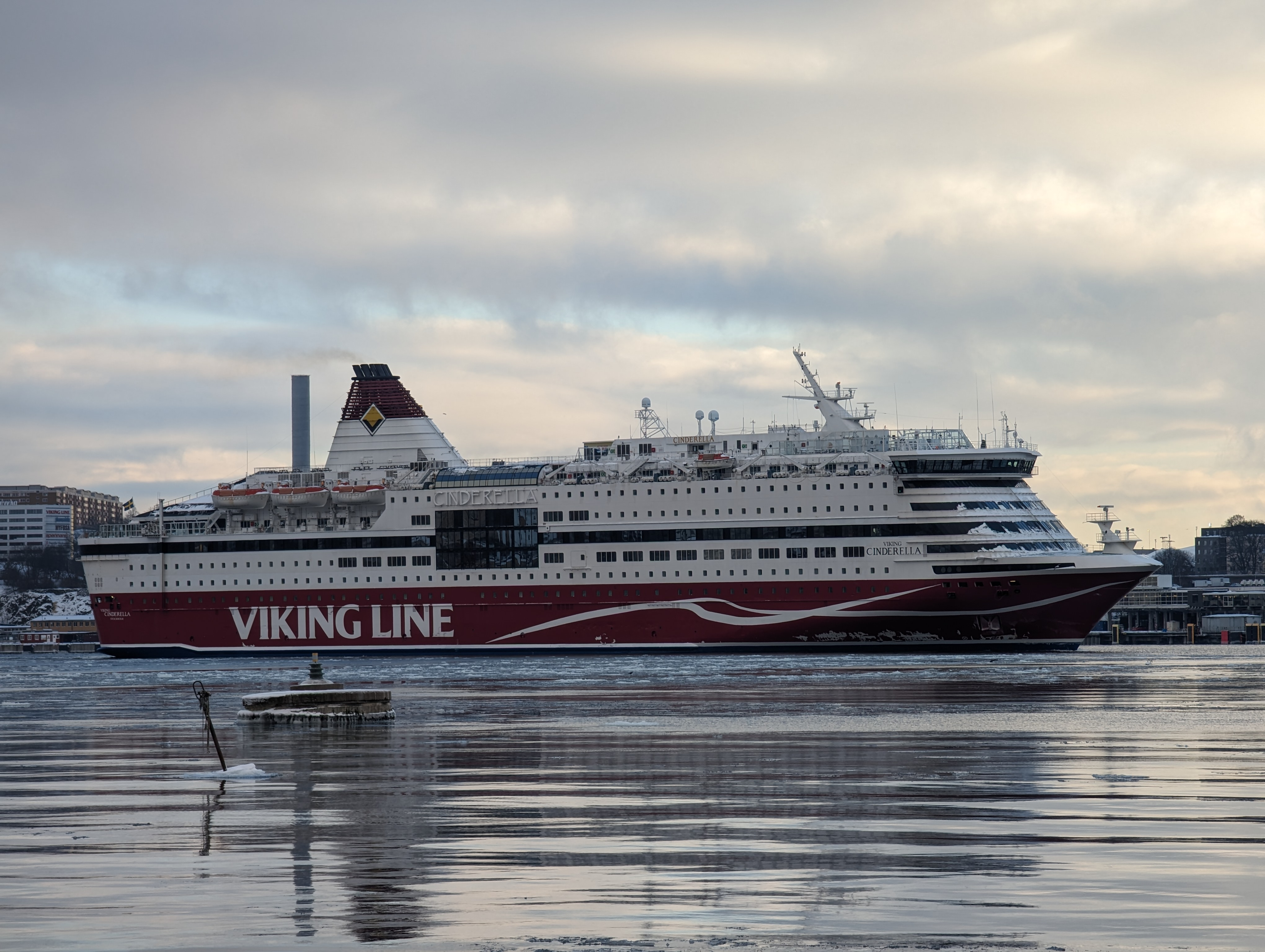
- Viking Cinderella in Stockholm 2024

History

Finland
- Name: 1989–2003: Cinderella; 2003–onwards: Viking Cinderella
- Owner: 1989–1995: SF Line; 1995–2003: Viking Line; 2003 onwards: Viking Rederi
- Operator: 1989–1995: SF Line (in Viking Line traffic); 1995 onwards: Viking Line
- Port of registry: 1989–2003. 2024 onwards: Mariehamn, Finland; 2003-2024: Stockholm, Sweden
- Route: Helsinki–Mariehamn–Stockholm
- Builder: Wärtsilä Marine Perno Shipyard, Turku, Finland
- Cost: SEK 850 million
- Yard number: 1302
- Laid down: 15 December 1988
- Launched: 15 April 1989
- Completed: 25 October 1989
- Acquired: 7 November 1989
- In service: 8 November 1989
- Identification: Call sign: OIZS; IMO number: 8719188; MMSI number: 266027000
- Status: In service

General characteristics (as built, 1989)
- Type: cruiseferry
- Tonnage: 46,398 GT; 4,228 DWT
- Length: 191.00 m (626 ft 8 in)
- Beam: 29.00 m (95 ft 2 in)
- Draught: 6.60 m (21 ft 8 in)
- Depth: 14.65 m (48 ft 1 in)
- Decks: 12 (11 passenger accessible)
- Ice class: 1 A Super
- Installed power: 4 × Wärtsilä-Sulzer 12ZAV40S; combined 28,800 kW (38,600 hp)
- Speed: 22 knots (41 km/h; 25 mph)
- Capacity: 2,700 passengers; 2,700 passenger berths; 480 cars

General characteristics (as rebuilt, 2003)
- Ice class: 1 A Super
- Speed: 21.5 knots (39.82 km/h; 24.74 mph)
- Capacity: 2,560 passengers; 2,500 passenger berths; 480 cars; 860 lanemeters of cargo
- Notes: Otherwise the same as built

MS Viking Cinderella (known as MS Cinderella from 1989 to 2003) is a cruiseferry built in 1989 at Wärtsilä Marine Perno Shipyard in Turku, Finland, as MS Cinderella for SF Line, one of the owners of the Viking Line consortium. She is currently used on the Helsinki–Mariehamn–Stockholm route. The ship was launched on 15 April 1989. It was the last ship to be built in Turku before the company Wärtsilä Marine went bankrupt. The ship is 191.0 metres long, 29.0 metres wide and has a draught of 6.74 metres. At the time of its completion, Viking Cinderella was the largest cruiseferry in the world. The ship's engines have a total power of 28,800 kilowatts and can achieve a maximum speed of 21.5 knots. The former captain of the ship, Henrik Grönvik, became captain of the Viking Grace when it was completed in 2013.

Viking Cinderella can carry 2560 passengers with enough cabins for 2500 people. The 4.8 metre high car deck can fit 480 personal cars or about 60 trucks. The ship has an ice class of 1A Super.

== History ==
=== 1989 to 2003 ===
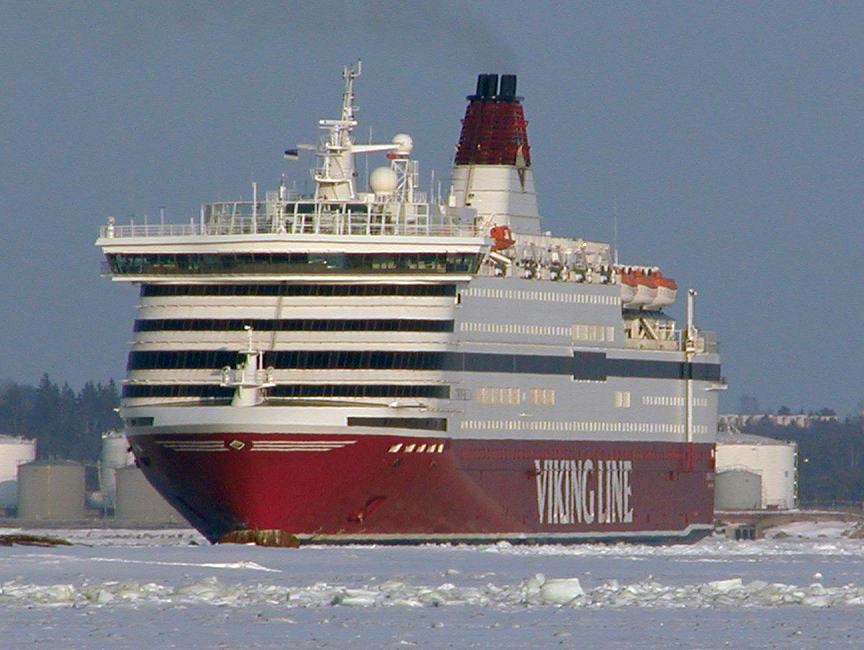
MS Cinderella in her original livery.

The Cinderella was planned in the later half of the 1980s as the new flagship for SF Line. Her interior layout was based on that of MS Amorella but with more space and additional facilities.

SF Line originally planned the Cinderella to take over the Mariella's place in Helsinki–Stockholm traffic (the Mariella would have been placed on a new route from Helsinki to Norrköping). The plan was never realised however, and when completed the Cinderella was placed as a third ship on the Helsinki–Stockholm route, with departures from Helsinki on Monday, Wednesday and Friday (at 19:30 instead of the normal 18:00), with a 25-hour (later 24-hour) cruise from Helsinki on Sundays. The one-day cruises proved very popular and after a few years they were made also on Fridays and Saturdays.

In 1993, after the other Viking Line partner Rederi AB Slite went bankrupt, the Cinderella took over MS Olympia's place on the Helsinki–Stockholm route, sailing in tandem with the Mariella. At this time her passenger capacity was upgraded to 2,700, but it was soon lowered back to 2500. In autumn 1994 she swapped routes with MS Isabella, returning to making 24 (later 20) hour cruises from Helsinki to Muuga and later to Tallinn.

In summers 1995 and 1996 Cinderella sailed on the Turku–Mariehamn–Stockholm route, freeing MS Rosella for the seasonal Naantali–Mariehamn–Kapellskär route. In summers 2002 and 2003 Cinderella made cruises from Helsinki to Riga in addition to the normal 20 hour Tallinn cruises.

=== 2003 to 2023 ===
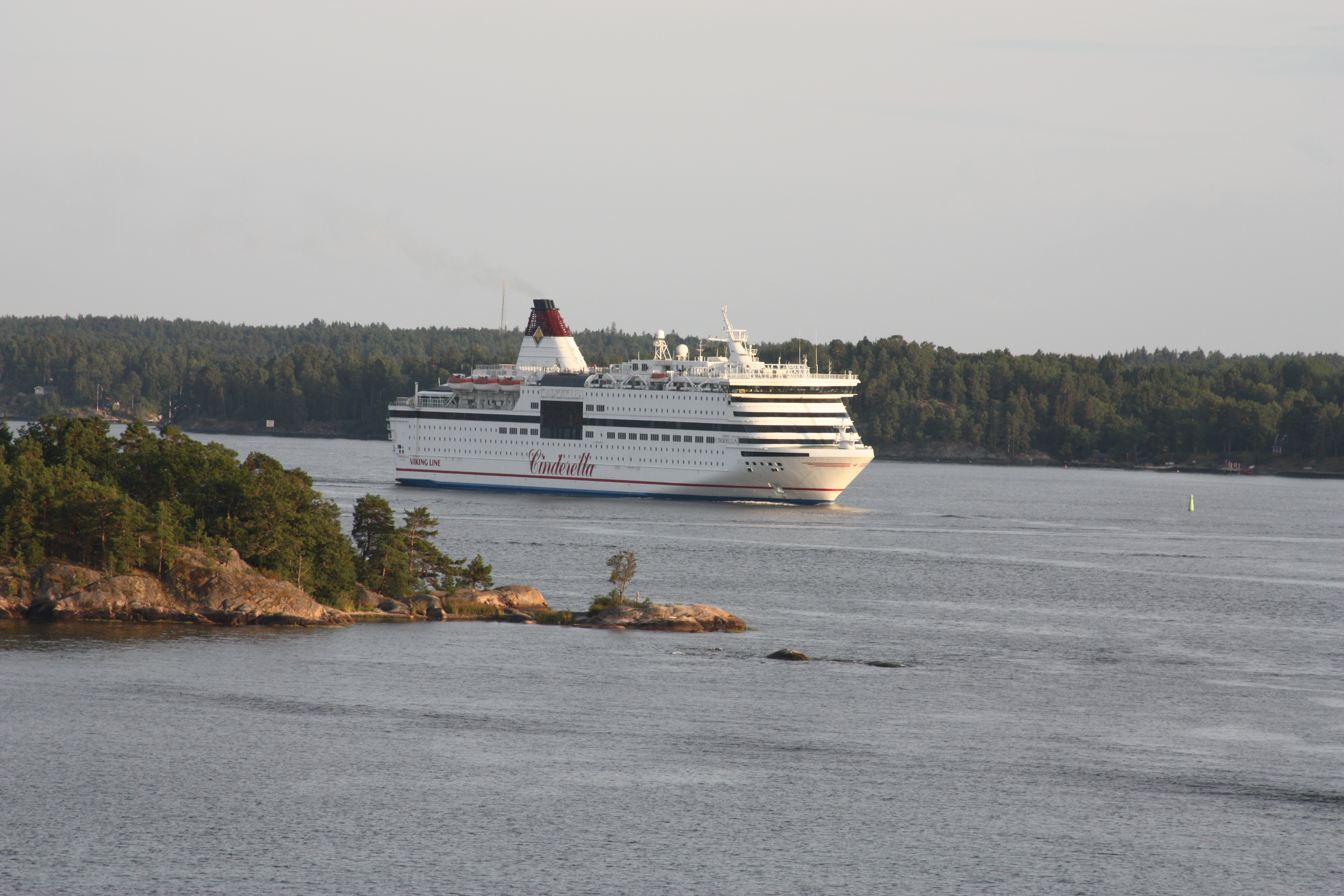
Viking Cinderella in the Stockholm Archipelago.

Viking Line decided to withdraw Cinderella from the Helsinki–Tallinn route after the end of the 2003 summer seasons, due to increased competition from Tallink's newer MS Romantika and the fact that tax-free sales on the route would end in 2004 when Estonia joined the EU. Ownership of Cinderella was transferred to the Swedish company Viking Rederi AB. Cinderella was extensively rebuilt in Naantali, and emerged as the all-white Swedish-flagged Viking Cinderella for the Stockholm–Mariehamn 22-hour cruise market.

The name change was dictated by necessity as a ship called Cinderella already existed in the Swedish ship registry, and it was not allowed to register two different ships with the same name. In 2003 the Viking Cinderella was declared the most environmentally friendly ship of her size in the world by the Swedish maritime authorities. The new image of the ship was red on white, in contrast to Viking Line's other ships which were coloured white on red. Another difference to Viking Line's other ships was that the ship's own name was in bigger text than the name of the company Viking Line.

From 2004 onwards Viking Cinderella made cruises to Riga (via Mariehamn in order to sell tax-free goods) during the summer season in addition to the 22-hour cruises. Negotiations were underway to restore the Stockholm-Mariehamn-Riga route in 2024.

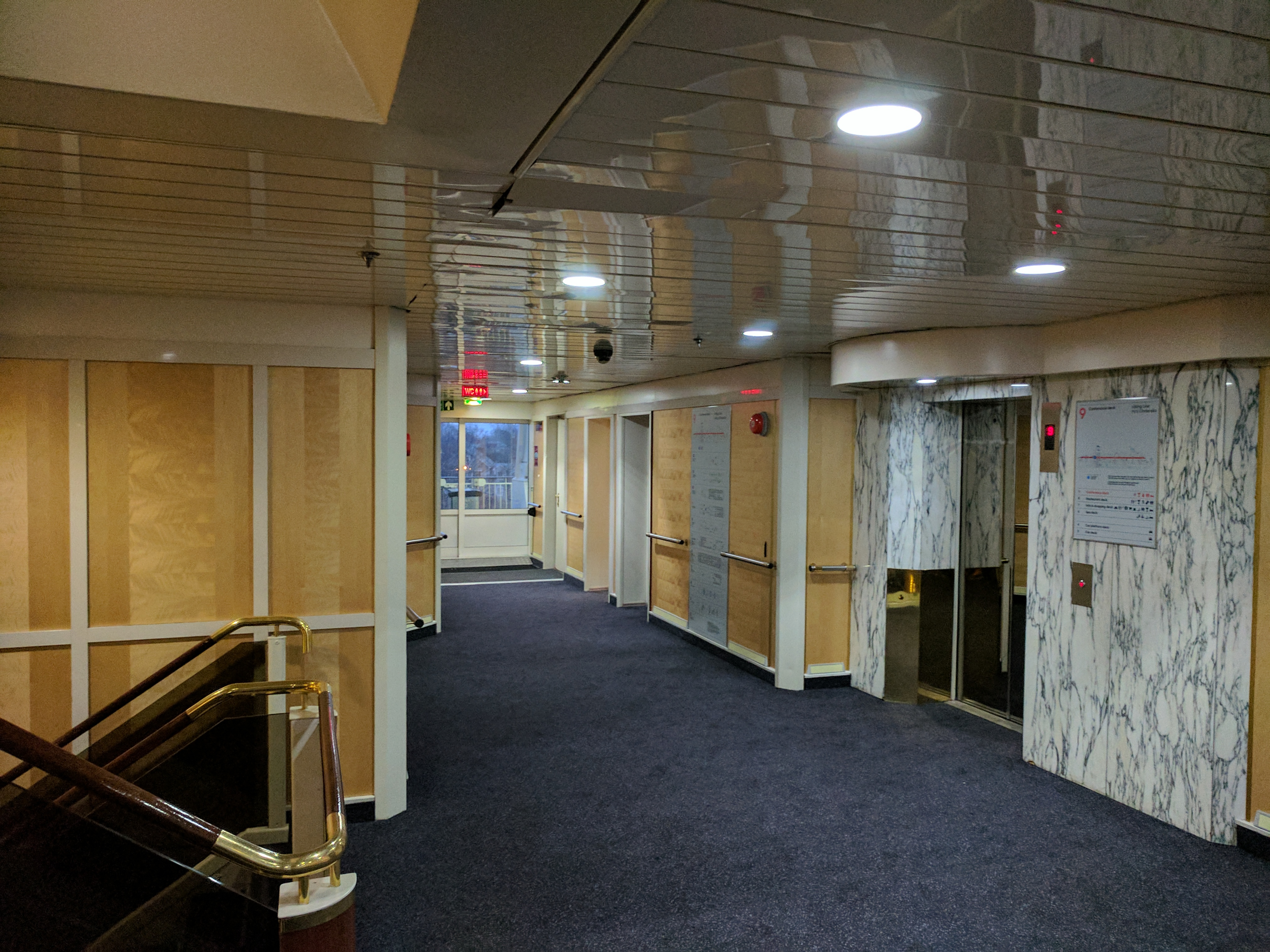
Interior of Viking Cinderella.

MS Viking Cinderella is the only ship left in the Viking Line fleet to sail under Swedish flag after MS Rosella and MS Viking XPRS were reflagged to Finland and Estonia in January 2014.

=== 2023 to present ===
After the joint purchase of MS Birka Stockholm with Rederi AB Gotland in August 2023, Viking Line announced that Viking Cinderella will be replaced on the Stockholm–Mariehamn cruise service in early 2024.

From March 2024, the ship has instead been employed on the Helsinki to Stockholm route. As a part of this move, the Viking Cinderella was reflagged to the Finnish flag. At the same time, Viking Line replaced the unusual colouring of Viking Cinderella with the company's traditional colouring of white on red.

=== Events on the ship ===
The popular Finnish giant student party "GooM" was held on Viking Cinderella from 1995 to 2003.

Cinderella served as the scene for the Noppapotti television show hosted by Jukka-Pekka Palo from 1995 to 1996 as well as the scene for the Passi ja hammasharja show from 1996 to 1998.

Viking Cinderella was the ship used in the Swedish Channel 5's reality show Färjan from 2008 to 2012. The show documented the daily routine of crew members aboard Viking Cinderella.

=== Dockings ===
- 28 August 20 20 September 2000 Naantali (Turku Repair Yard)
- 18 to 31 August 2003 Naantali (Turku Repair Yard)
- 9 to 20 January 2005 Stockholm (Finnboda Varv)
- 10 to 21 June 2006 Naantali (Turku Repair Yard)
- 1 to 18 June 2009 Landskrona (Öresundsvarvet)
- 7 to 24 January 2014 Landskrona (Öresundsvarvet)
- 3 to 18 January 2017 Landskrona (Öresundsvarvet)
- 2 to 19 January 2024 Naantali (Turku Repair Yard)

== Spaces and services ==
=== Decks ===
Deck 12
Panorama deck - sun deck and bar.
Deck 11
Captain's deck - cabins of class LXB, sun deck and bridge.
Deck 10
Compass deck - cabins of class Suite, LXA, A2, AD2 and B2, Night Club Étage (upper floor).
Deck 9
Conference deck - cabins of class Suite, LXA, AD2, BD2, A2 and B4, conference rooms (Adventure Islands in summer, Kids' playroom outside summer), sun deck and Night Club Étage (upper floor).
Deck 8
Restaurant deck - restaurants Viking Buffet, Seaview Dining, Ocean Grill, Bottega Prosecco Bar and Banquet, games, casino and Night Club Étage (lower floor).
Deck 7
Info & shopping deck - cabins of class A2 and B4, tax-free shopping, Club 7even, Nöjescafé, Pub Hornblower, information, children's play room and embarkation and disembarkation.
Deck 6
Spa deck - cabins of class A4 and B4, sauna and swimming pool.
Deck 5
Bell deck - cabins of class A4R, HA3, HB3, B4 and B4R, embarkation and disembarkation.
Deck 4
Upper parking deck - car deck (for personal cars, can be lifted up).
Deck 3
Lower parking deck - car deck.
Deck 2
Anchor deck - cabins of class C4 and C2P, upper engine room and engine surveillance.
Deck 1
primary and secondary engine rooms, boiler room and other technical facilities.

=== Cabins ===
With the advent of Viking Grace, Viking Line has replaced the traditional letter-number abbreviations of the cabin classes with more descriptive names. All cabins have a toilet and a shower.

Suite
A cabin for 4 persons with a double bed and a sofa bed. Breakfast is included. Area about 50 m².
Seaside Premium (LXA)
A spacious cabin for 4 persons with a window. A double bed and a sofa bed. Area 29 m².
Seaside Premium Promenade (LXB)
A spacious cabin for 2 persons with a window. The window faces the outer deck. A double bed. Area 12.9 m².
Seaside Comfort (AD2)
A spacious cabin for 2 persons with a window. A double bed. Area 9 m².
Inside Comfort (BD2)
A spacious cabin for 2 persons without a window. A double bed. Area 9 m².
Seaside Standard (A4)
A cabin for 4 persons with a window. Two bunk beds with two beds each. Area 9 m².
Seaside Standard Allergy (A4R)
A cabin for 4 persons with a window without a full-floor carpet. Two bunk beds with two beds each. Area 9 m².
Seaside Standard (A2)
A cabin for 2 persons with a window. Two separate beds. Area 9 m².
Seaside Handicap (HA3)
A cabin for 3 persons with a window. Designed for the handicapped. Area 17.8 m².
Inside Handicap (HB3)
A cabin for 3 persons without a window. Designed for the handicapped. Area 17.8 m².
Inside Standard (B4)
A cabin for 4 persons without a window. Two bunk beds with two beds each. Area 8.4 m².
Inside Standard Allergy (B4R)
A cabin for 4 persons without a window without a full-floor carpet. Two bunk beds with two beds each. Area 8.4 m².
Inside Standard (B2)
A cabin for 2 persons without a window. Two separate beds. Area 8.4 m².
Economy (C4)
A cabin for 4 persons without a window. Two bunk beds with two beds each. Area 8.4 m².
Economy Piccolo (C2P)
A small economy cabin for 2 people without a window. One bunk bed with two beds. Area 7.9 m².

== Gallery ==
=== Exterior ===
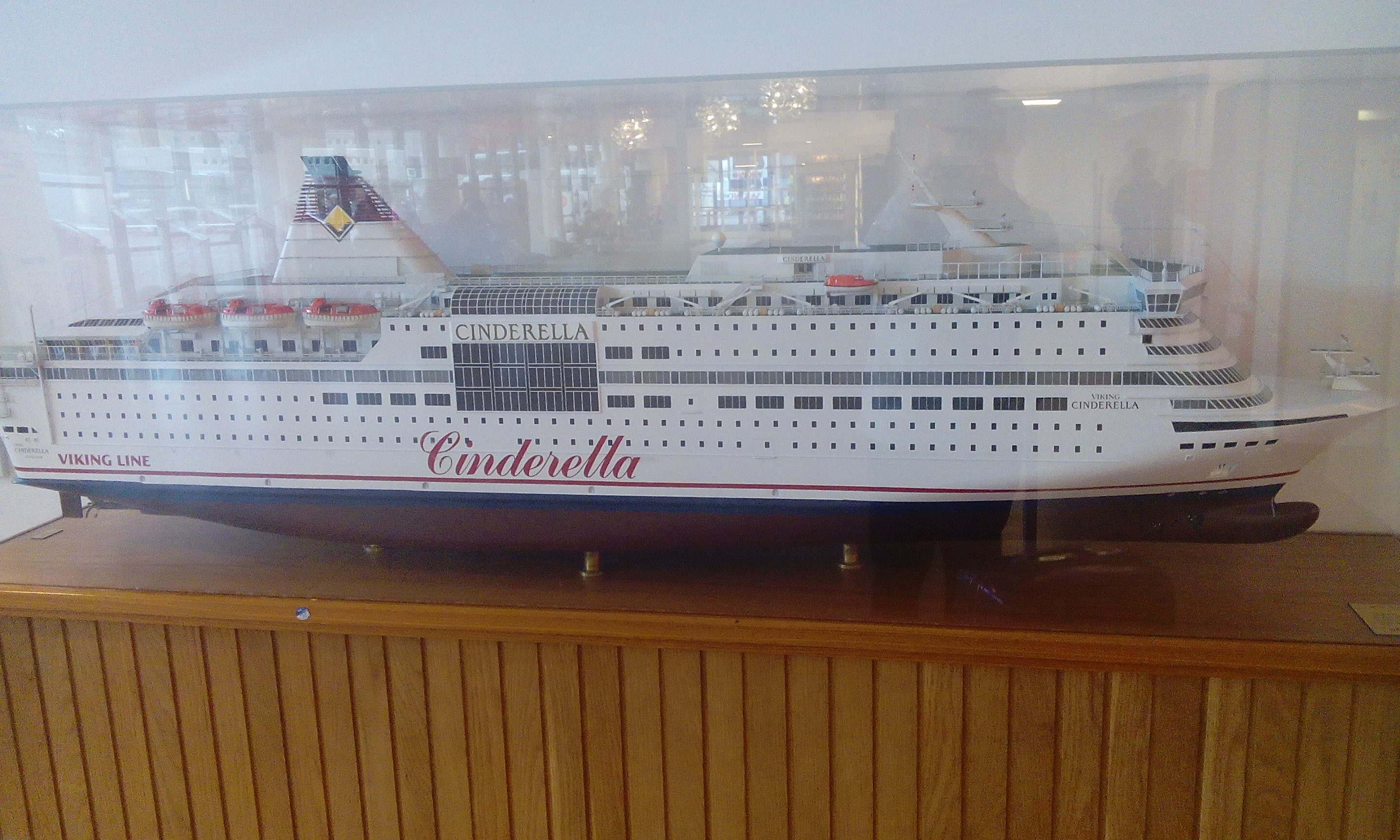
A model of the ship at the Stockholm terminal.

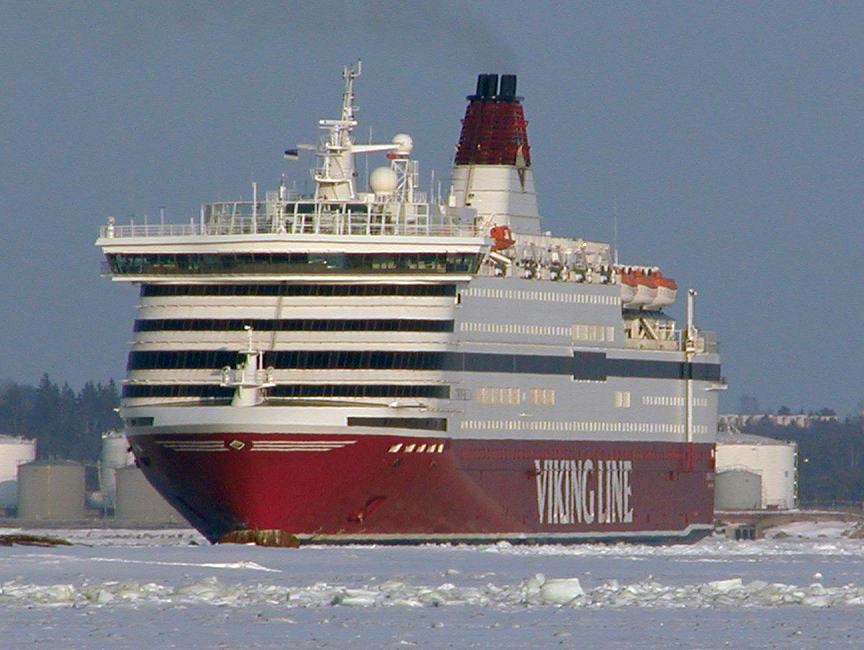
The ship in its original colours in Helsinki in winter 2003.

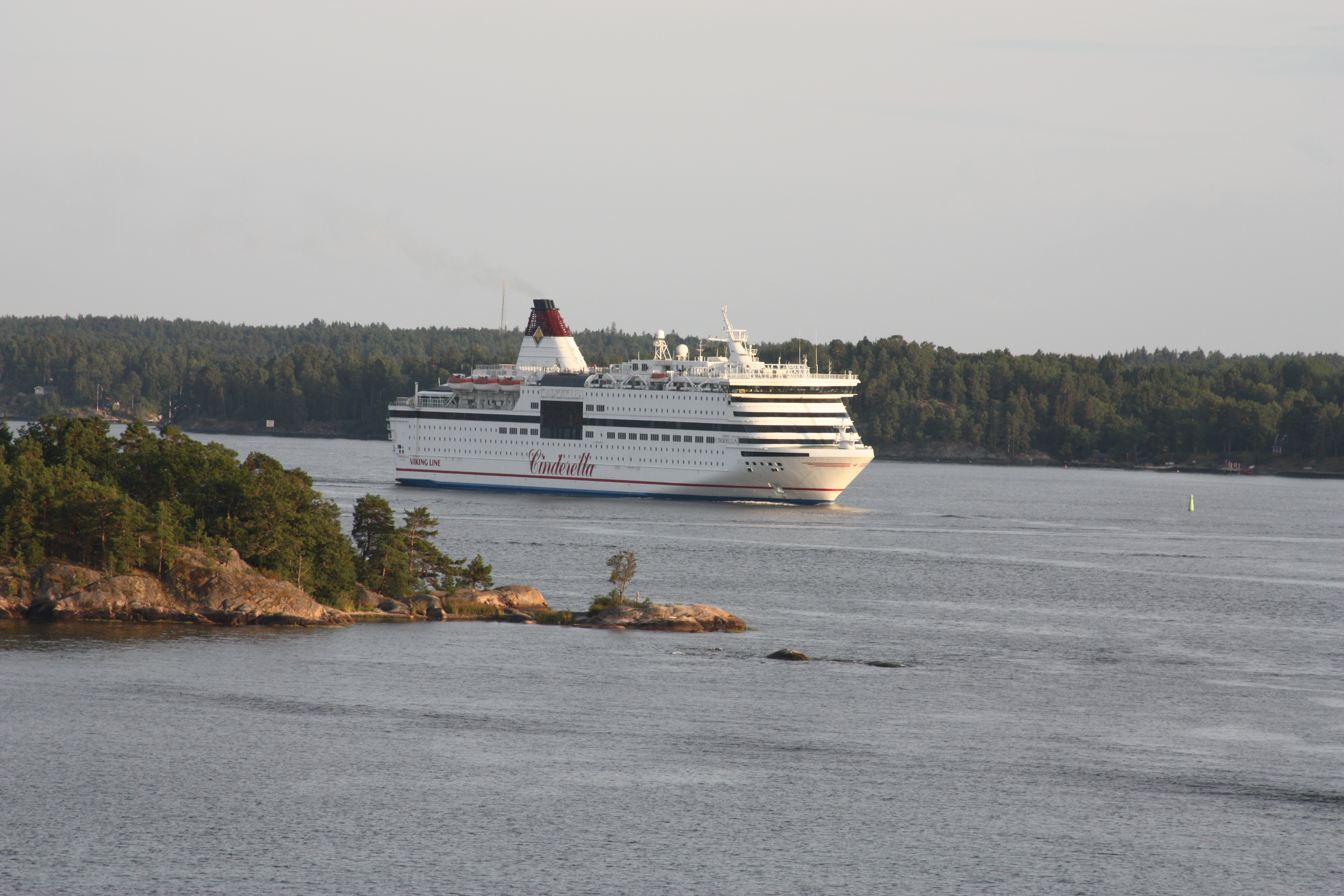
The ship in the Stockholm archipelago.

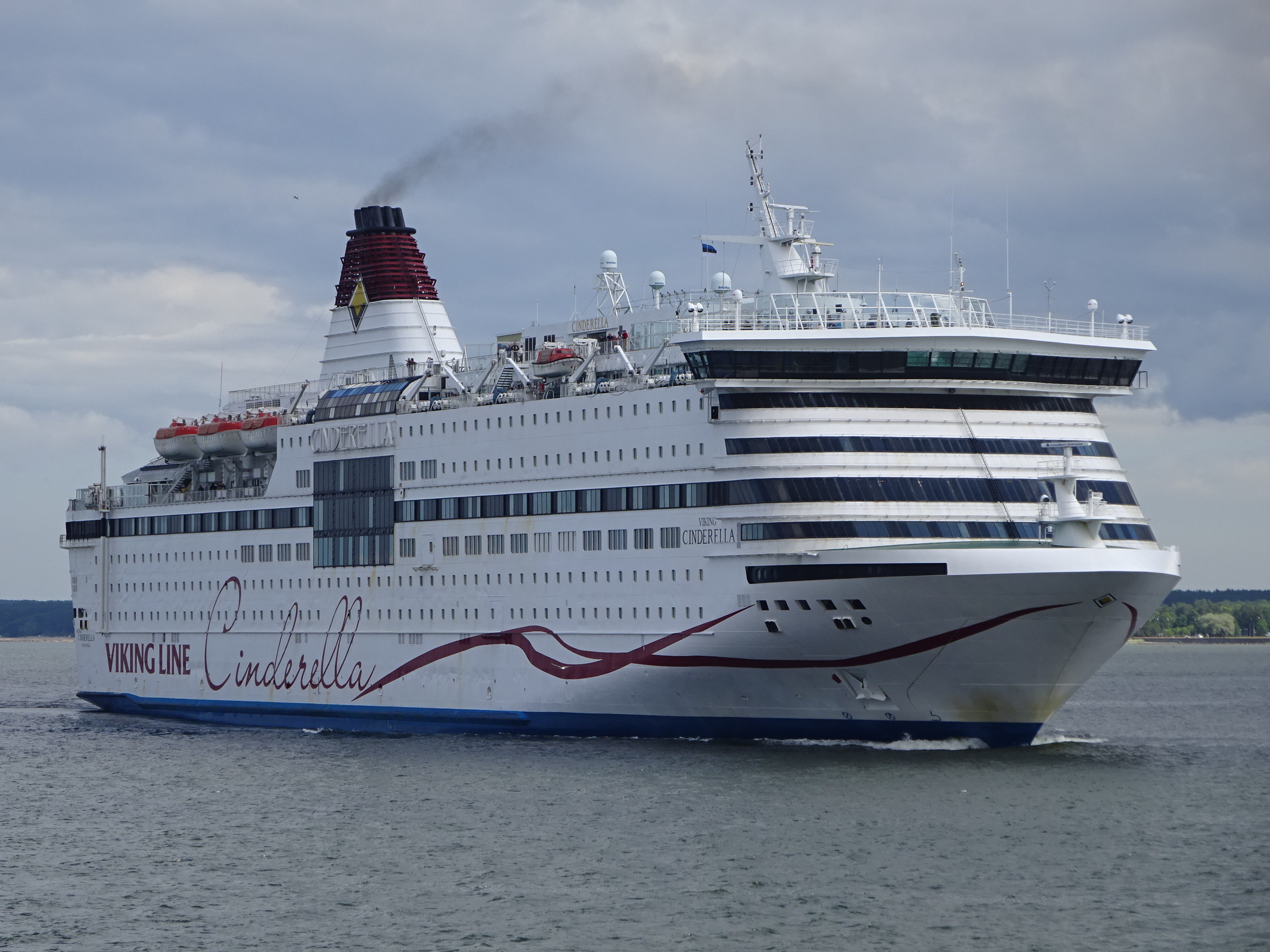
The ship arriving in Tallinn in July 2023.

=== Interior ===
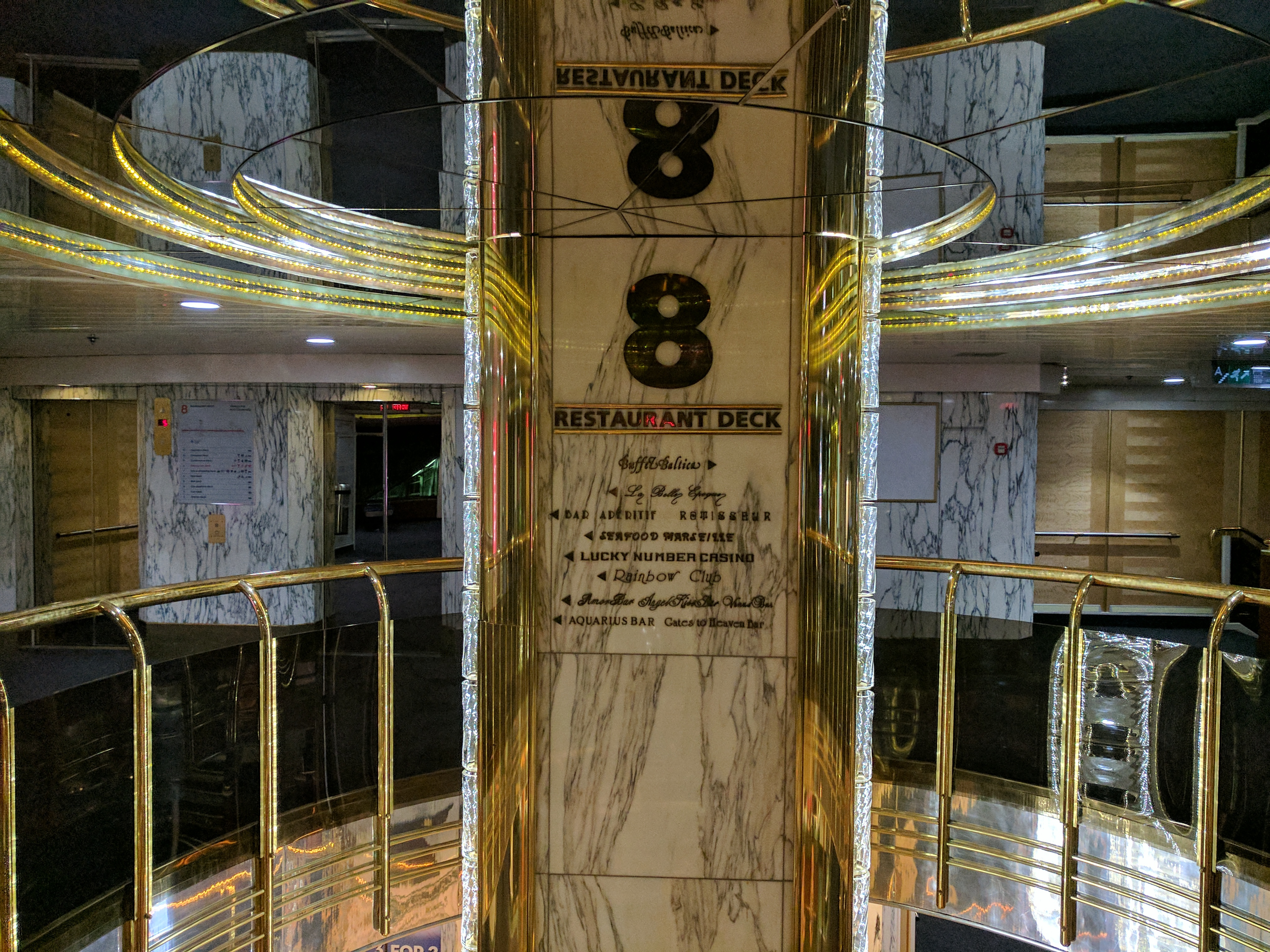
The atrium.

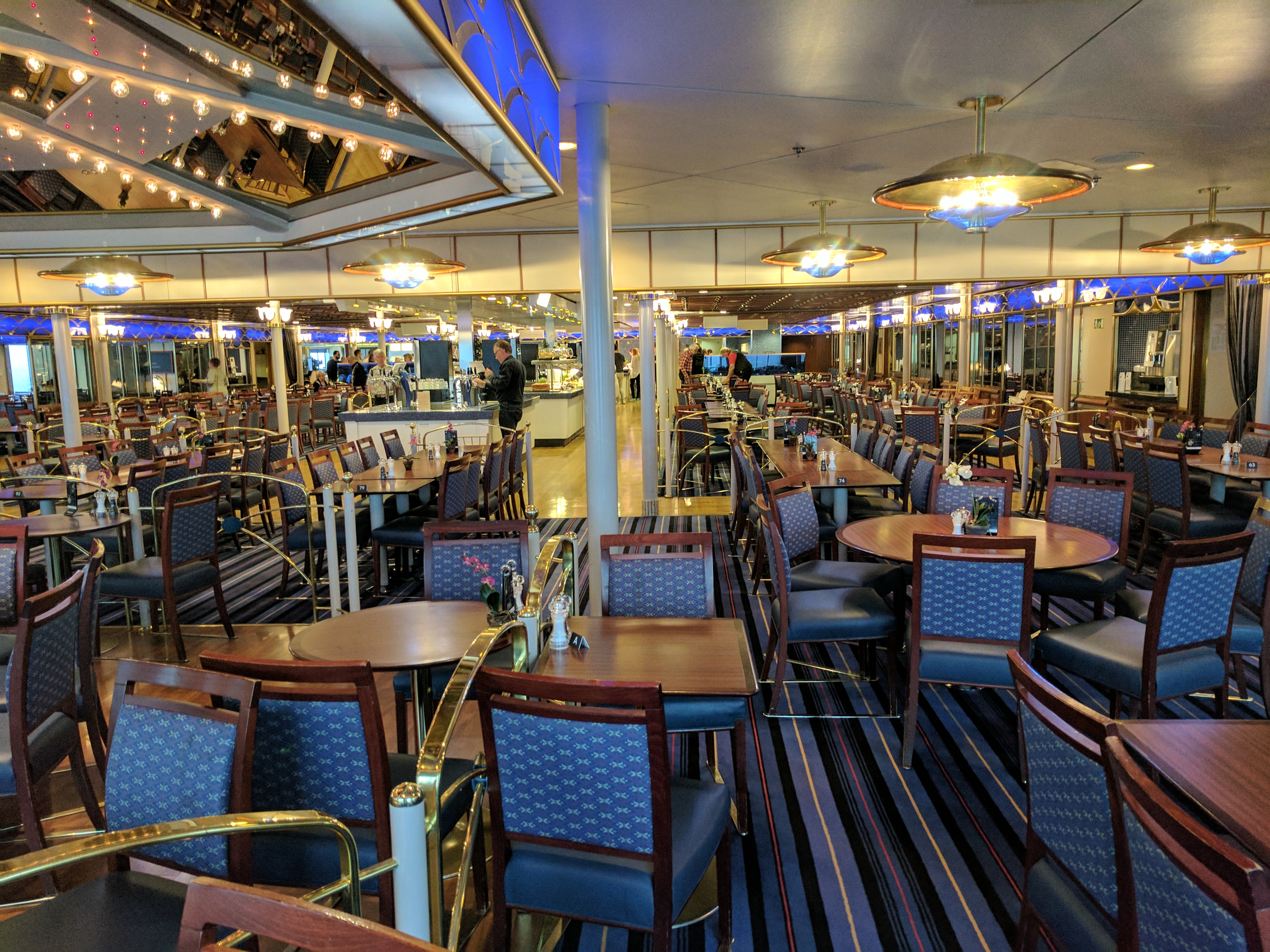
A restaurant-

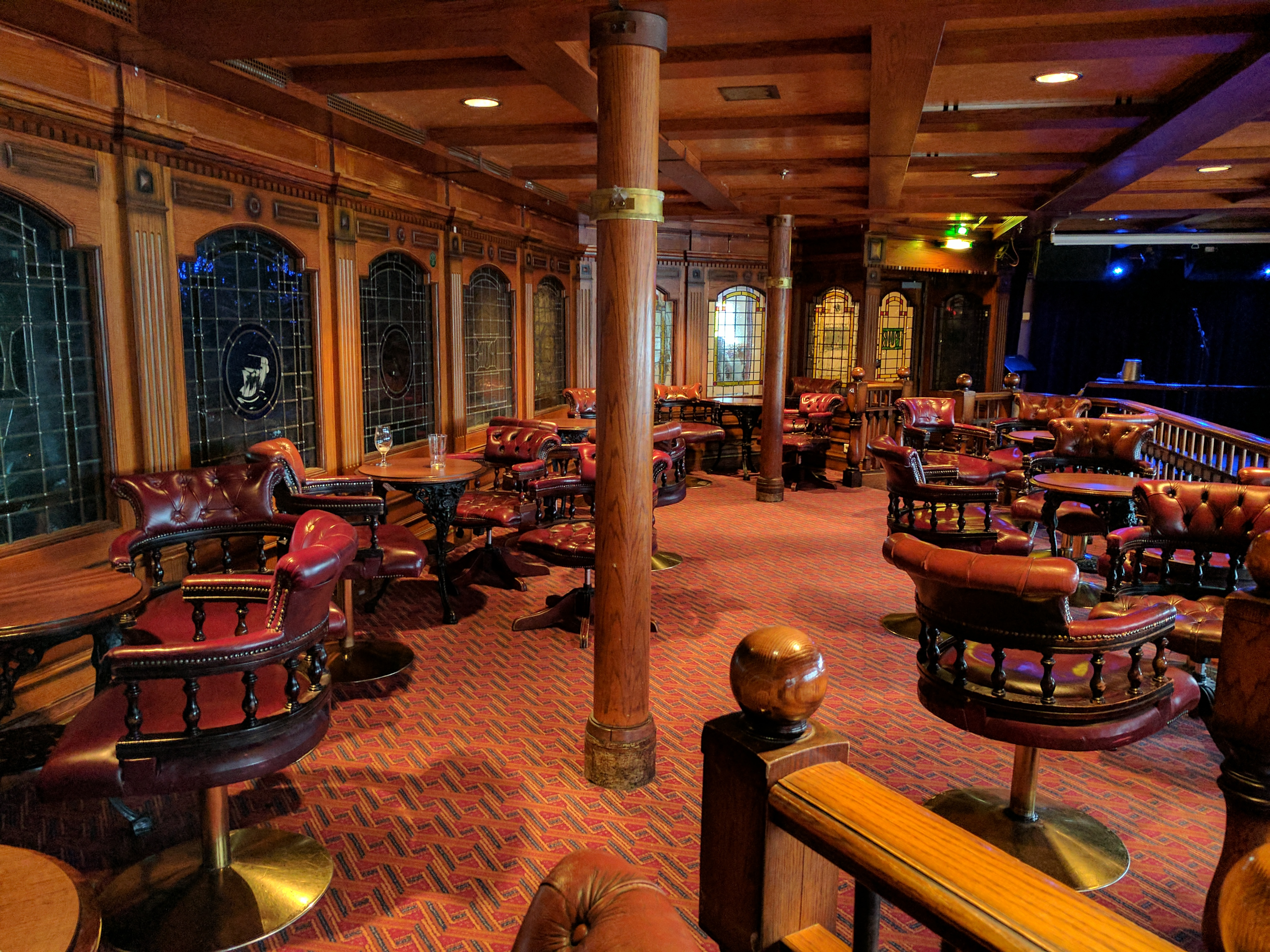
A pub.

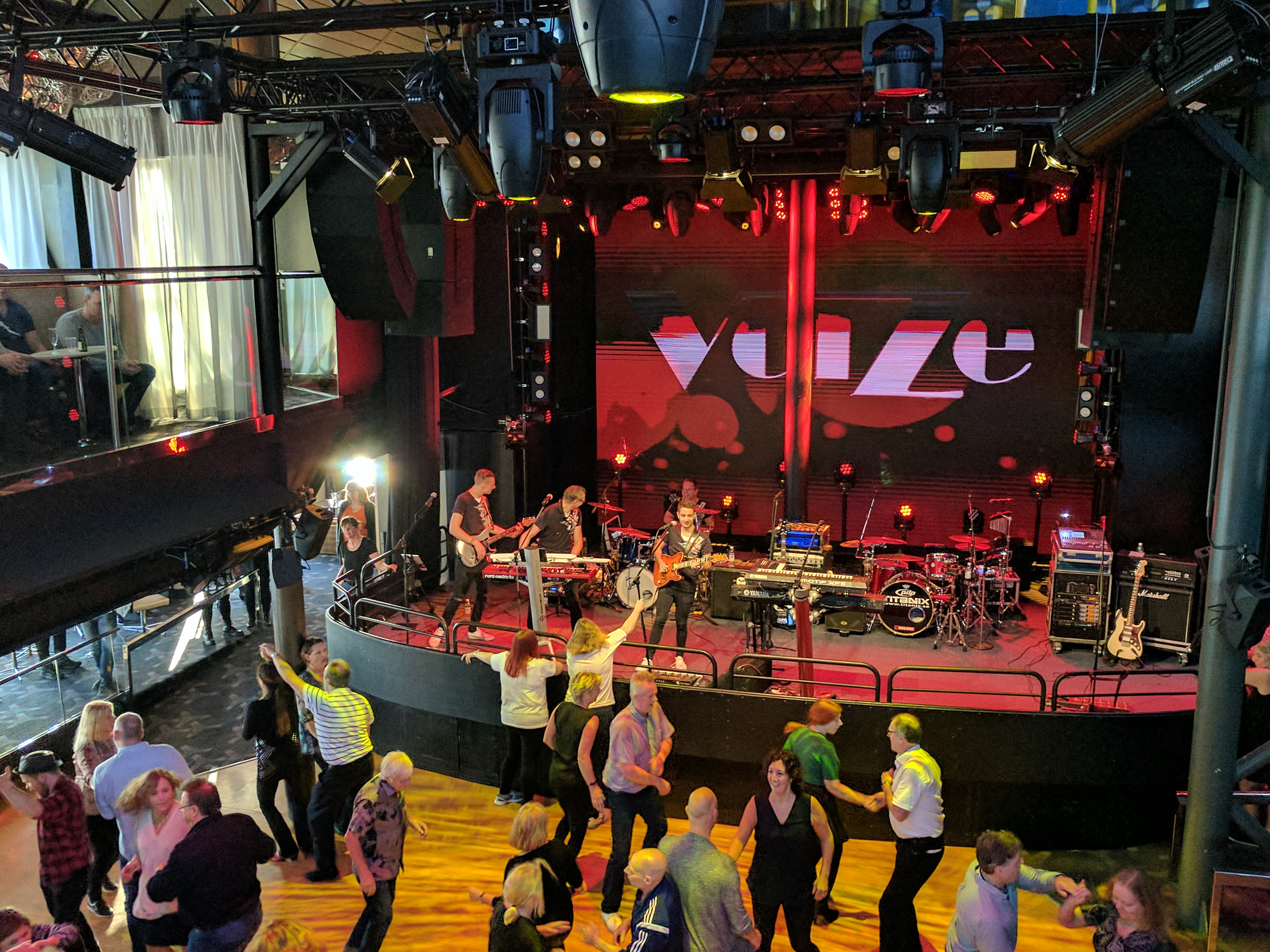
The stage at the nightclub.

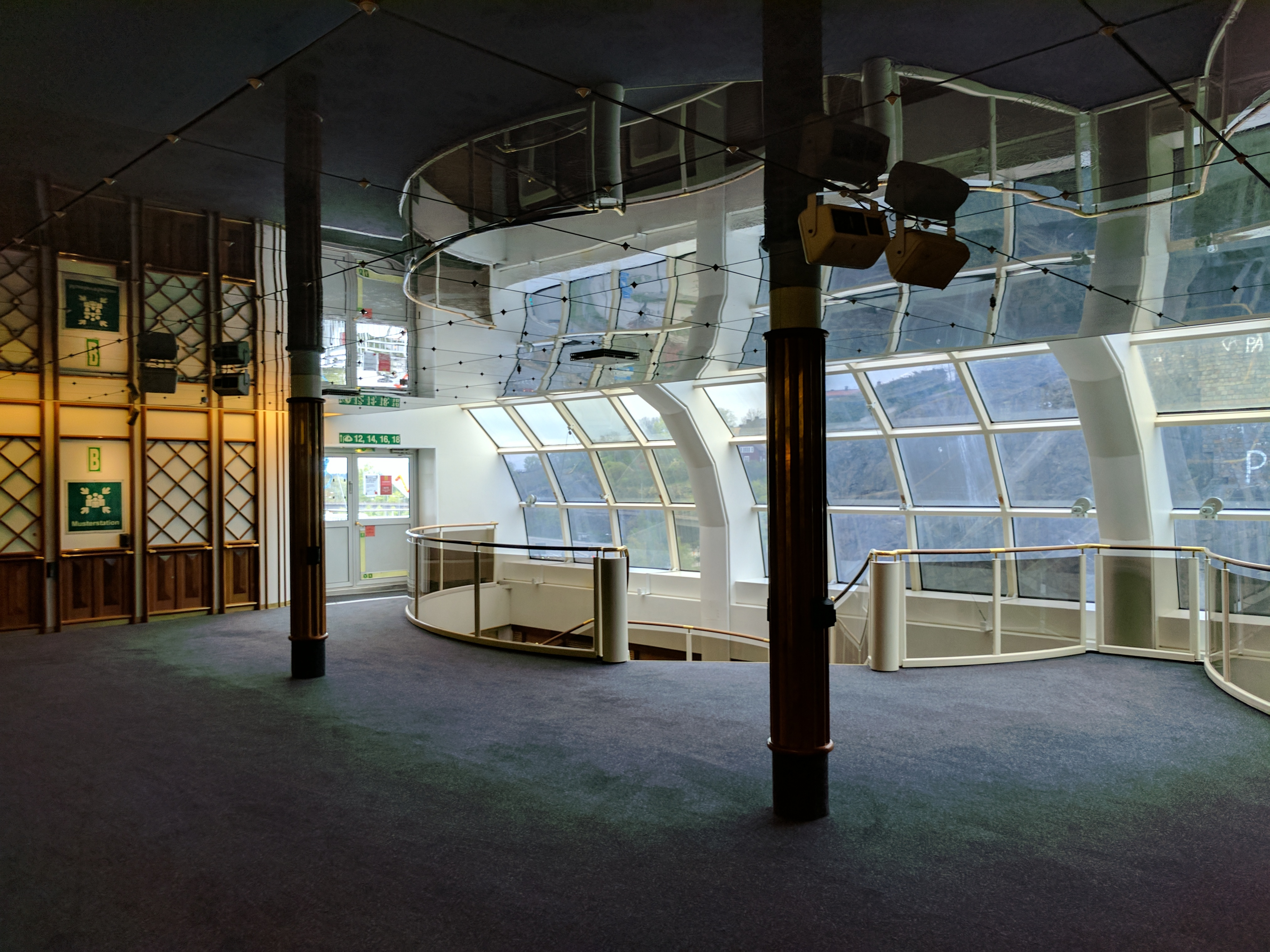
Deck 11.

== See also ==
- Largest ferries of Europe

Preceded by MS Athena	World's Largest Cruiseferry; 1989–1990	Succeeded by MS Silja Serenade
