= Chained dollars =

Used to express real dollar amounts adjusted over time for inflation

Chained dollars is a method of adjusting real dollar amounts for inflation over time, to allow the comparison of figures from different years. The U.S. Department of Commerce introduced the chained-dollar measure in 1996. It generally reflects dollar figures computed with an Economic Census year designated as the base year.

== Description ==
Chained dollars, also known as "chained consumer price index" or "chained CPI," is a measure of inflation that takes into account changes in consumer behavior in response to changes in prices. It is used to adjust certain economic variables, such as tax brackets and Social Security payments, for inflation. The traditional measure of inflation, known as the "headline CPI," assumes that consumers continue to buy the same basket of goods and services over time, even as prices change. However, in reality, consumers may adjust their spending habits in response to changes in prices. For example, if the price of beef increases, consumers may switch to purchasing chicken instead. The chained CPI accounts for these changes in consumer behavior by calculating the cost of a "chained" basket of goods and services that reflects how consumers adjust their spending in response to price changes. As a result, the chained CPI tends to grow more slowly than the headline CPI, as it takes into account the fact that consumers are shifting their spending to lower-priced items in response to price changes.

The use of the chained CPI to adjust economic variables has been controversial. It generally records a lower inflation rate over time. When national policy is formulated around it, it may have negative impacts on certain groups of people, such as those having low income or fixed income.

== Terms ==
- Constant Dollars: weighted by a constant/unchanging basket/list of goods and services.
- Chained Dollars: weighted by a basket/list that changes yearly to more accurately reflect actual spending. The basket is an average of the basket for successive pairs of years; example of paired years are 2010–2011, 2011–2012, etc.

The technique is so named because the second number in a pair of successive years becomes the first in the next pair. The result is a continuous "chain" of weights and averages. The advantage of using the chained-dollar measure is that it is more closely related to any given period covered and is subject to less distortion over time.

== See also ==
- Inflation adjustment
- Constant dollars
