= Bertel Långhjelm =

Finnish engineer

Vuorineuvos Curt Bertel Casimir Långhjelm
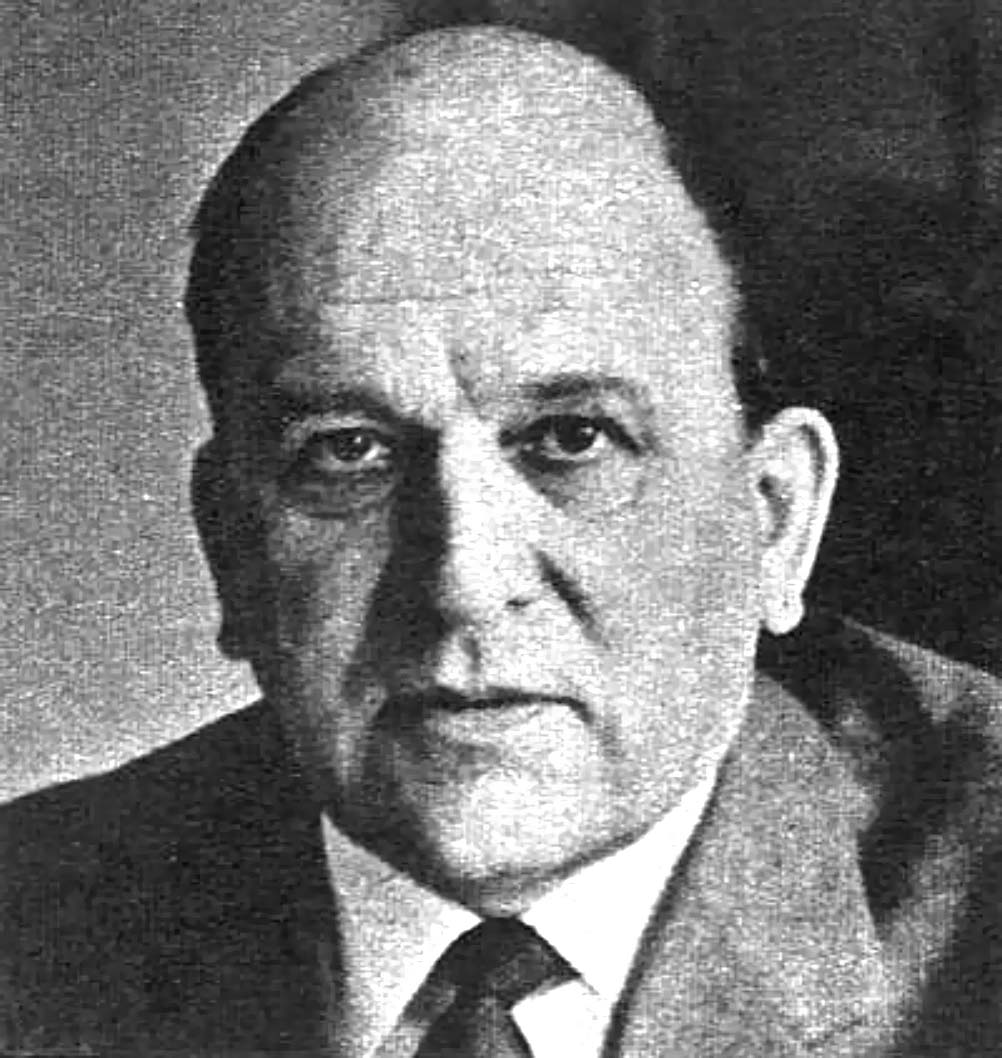
- Born: 4 June 1903; Helsinki, Grand Duchy of Finland
- Died: 16 February 1987 (aged 83); Helsinki, Finland
- Education: MSc, Electrical Engineering
- Alma mater: Helsinki University of Technology
- Political party: SFP
- Board member of: Wärtsilä (1955–1976); Vaasan Sähkö Oy (1946–1949); Finnish Engineering Industry Association (1952–1971); Finnish Industry Federation (1952–1971); Finnish Engineering Industry Employers' Federation (1957–); FÅA; Suomen Merivakuutus Oy
- Spouse: Iris Helena née Swens
- Parent(s): Carl Georg Reinhold Långhjelm and Alma Fredrika née Holm
- Awards: vuorineuvos (1962); Commander of the Order of the Lion of Finland; Knight of the White Rose of Finland, 1st Class; Memorial Medal for Winter War; Civil Defence Medal of Merit, 1st Class; Grand Cross of the Order of Leopold II (Belgium); Commander of the Order of Vasa, 1st Class (Sweden); Commander of the Order of Republic (Tunisia)

Manager of Wärtsilä
- In office 1962–1970
- Preceded by: Wilhelm Wahlforss
- Succeeded by: Tankmar Horn

Curt Bertel Casimir Långhjelm (4 June 1903 – 16 February 1987) was a Finnish engineer, businessman and vuorineuvos.

Långhjelm was born in Helsinki. He graduated as MSc in Electrical Engineering in Helsinki University of Technology in 1926. He continued his studies in the UK in 1928–1929, and after his return in Finland in 1930 he became power grid inspector. He started in electrical equipment producer Strömberg in 1935 and became site manager in 1945.

Långhjelm demonstrated good leadership and organisational skills, and was recruited to leading position in shipbuilding and engineering company Wärtsilä in 1951. He worked as general manager in 1962–1970.

== Early years and studies ==
Långhjelm was born in Helsinki, Grand Duchy of Finland. His father Carl Långhjelm worked as chief inspector in a life insurance company; his mother was Alma née Holm. Länghjelm graduated from the Helsinki Swedish normal lyceum in 1921, after which he went to study Electrical Engineering in Helsinki University of Technology. He did his Master's degree in 1926, and in the following year he became Operating Engineer in Karhula company. Långhjelm wanted to further deepen his knowledge in electrical engineering and spent years 1928–1929 studying in UK after a scholarship. Långhjelm returned to Finland in 1930 with improved language skills, professional knowledge and business skills.

== Electrical Inspectorate ==
In 1930 Långhjelm became inspector in couple of years earlier founded Sähkötarkastuslaitos (Electrical Inspectorate), that monitored safety of electricity generation, grid and use in the rapidly electrifying country. He took part in creating inspection practices and instructions, and wrote articles to Finnish electrical trade journals. The energetic expert became soon a prominent figure on the field.

== Strömberg ==
Långhjelm was recruited to the leading Finnish electrical equipment producer Oy Strömberg Ab in 1935. Following the 1930s recession, the Finnish pulp and paper industry companies had started massive investments on machinery which led to growing orders of electrical components.

During the Second World War Långhjelm worked also as Technical Manager of electricity company Malmin Sähkölaitos Oy. Strömberg became part of strategically important war industry, and production was decentralised due to safety reasons. Strömberg founded new production site in Vaasa, Ostrobothnia, and Långhjelm was appointed its manager in 1945. According to the Moscow Armistice, Finland had to pay large war reparations to Soviet Union, and the Vaasa factory had an important role in the Finnish war reparation industry. Långhjelm developed the factory in challenging circumstances in continuous lack of materials, labour, facilities and cash. The most important part of the factory's contribution on war reparations were 25,000 electric motors delivered to Soviet Union. The time of reconstruction until the early 1950s was the time of most rapid growth in the company history.

== Wärtsilä ==
Långhjelm's achievements were also noted by Wilhelm Wahlforss, general manager of the shipbuilding and engineering company Wärtsilä. In 1951 he recruited Långhjelm to Deputy Director. Their characters were different, but complemented each other.

Långhjelm took part in trade negotiations with Soviet Union; Wärtsilä got increasingly demanding ship orders from the eastern neighbour. Moreover, Långhjelm managed to increase foothold on West European and domestic market. He had a strong role in 1956 introduced act, which strengthened the financial position of Finnish shipbuilders in international market by tax reliefs and improved credit terms; the law became known as Lex Långhjelm.

Långhjelm became board member in the middle of the 1950s and in the beginning of 1962 he followed Wahlforss as general manager of Wärtsilä. In the same year he was titled vuorineuvos. Långhjelm, however, started to move aside from operative management, and moved responsibility gradually to Tankmar Horn. Horn followed Långhjelm as Wärtsilä leader in 1970.

== Political career ==
Långhjelm was member of Vaasa city council in 1950–1951. During 1963–1965 he belonged to Ekenäs town board and he was in town council in 1965. In the 1960s he had number of positions of trust in Vaasa and Ekenäs, as an SFP member.

== Organisational activities ==
Långhjelm was an influential character in Finnish Industry Federation, Finnish Engineering Industry Association and number of engineering related associations. During 1934–1947 Länghjelm was the Finnish national committee secretary in the World Energy Congress.

== Personal life ==
Långhjelm was married to Iris Helena née Swens. His favourite hobby was sailing; he used to make long sailing trips in the Finnish archipelago. He also spent his free time with literature.
