= Timo Teräsvirta =

Finnish economist (born 1941)

- Born: 21 January 1941 (age 85); Helsinki, Finland

Academic background
- Education: University of Helsinki

Academic work
- Discipline: Econometrics
- Institutions: Aarhus University; Stockholm School of Economics; University of Helsinki
- Website: Information at IDEAS / RePEc

Timo Teräsvirta (born 21 January 1941) is a Finnish economist. He made notable contributions in time series analysis, working with Clive Granger among others.

Teräsvirta earned his Ph.D. from the University of Helsinki in 1970, under the supervision of Leo Törnqvist.
