= United States Chained Consumer Price Index =

Time series measure of price levels

Chained Consumer Price Index for All Urban Consumers (C-CPI-U)
Supplementary U.S. Macroeconomic Indicator

Administration & Metadata
- Maintained By: Bureau of Labor Statistics (BLS)
- Frequency: Monthly
- Base Period: December 1999 = 100
- First Published: August 2002

Latest Data (August 2026)
- C-CPI-U Level: 185.739
- Headline Inflation (YoY): 3.3%
- Monthly Change (MoM): +0.3% (Not Seasonally Adjusted)
- Data Status: Initial / Subject to quarterly revision

Methodological Framework
- Formula Type: Superlative Törnqvist index (geometric-average weights)
- Core Objective: Eliminates consumer substitution bias across broad item categories
- Revision Cycle: Released as initial, revised quarterly as final consumer expenditure data arrives with lag

Key Applications & Policy
- U.S. Tax Code: Mandated since 2017 to adjust federal income tax brackets and standard deductions
- Fiscal Impact: Tends to grow 0.25–0.30% slower per year than traditional CPI-U, gradually slowing growth of indexed tax brackets
- Proposed Scope: Frequently proposed to adjust Social Security COLAs to lower the federal budget deficit

Related Indexes
- Broad Fixed Index: CPI-U (August 2026 YoY: 3.4%)
- Wage Earner Index: CPI-W (August 2026 YoY: 3.5%)

The United States Chained Consumer Price Index (C-CPI-U), also known as chain-weighted CPI or chain-linked CPI, is a time series measure of price levels of consumer goods and services created by the US Department of Labor Bureau of Labor Statistics as an alternative to the US Consumer Price Index. It is based on the idea that when prices of different goods change at different rates, consumers will adjust their purchasing patterns by purchasing more of products whose relative prices have declined and fewer of those whose relative price has increased. This reduces the cost of living reported, but has no change on the cost of living; it is simply a way of accounting for a microeconomic "substitution effect." The "fixed weight" CPI also takes such substitutions into account, but does so through a periodic adjustment of the "basket of goods" that it represents, rather than through a continuous adjustment in that basket. Application of the chained CPI to federal benefits has been controversially proposed to reduce the federal deficit.

== Background ==
Currently, the Bureau of Labor Statistics computes each month average prices of 211 different categories of goods and services in 38 different urban geographical areas, totaling 8,018 different elementary indices. From these, higher-level indices are obtained as weighted averages of these elementary indices, using different weights for different categories of goods and services nationwide or for different groups of consumers. One set of weights is used to obtain a consumer price index (CPI) for all urban consumers (CPI-U). Another is used to compute a CPI for urban wage earners and clerical workers (CPI-W). The weights for CPI-U and CPI-W are currently updated in January of every even-numbered year to correct for "substitution bias", the idea that consumers will change their buying patterns to keep their cost of living from rising as quickly as inflation.

To understand "substitution bias", consider for example the price of Granny Smith apples. If the price of those apples increases faster than the price of Red Delicious apples, or if the price of Granny Smith declines more slowly than the price of Red Delicious apples, consumers may decide to purchase more Red Delicious apples; this "lower-level" substitution bias is accounted for in the current CPI-U and CPI-W. However, if the price of apples increases faster than that of oranges, or if the price of apples declines more slowly than the price of oranges, consumers on average will respond by purchasing fewer apples and more oranges. This changes the "market basket" of goods they buy; this "upper-level" substitution is not accounted for in the traditional CPI until the next adjustment which could be up to two years later, but impacts the Chained CPI (C-CPI-U) the next month.

== Impact on benefits ==
Various public and private organizations use CPI data for Cost of Living Adjustments (COLAs) for programs like Social Security and for provisions of the tax code. Currently most programs are indexed to the CPI-U or the CPI-W.

Changes in consumer prices are used to determine issues such as Cost of Living Adjustments, so any reduction in the official estimate of inflation would reduce payments to workers and retirees. If the official adjustment is greater than the inflation experienced by the recipients of the adjustment, they get an unearned benefit; if it's less than the real inflation, they are penalized—and the expense to those paying wages or retirement benefits are impacted in a complementary fashion. Beyond this, various thresholds in the tax code are also indexed to a CPI: If these thresholds grow more slowly, tax receipts would likely increase.

Application of chained CPI has been suggested as a means of reducing the US federal budget deficit by reducing the rate of growth of government benefits. The Moment of Truth Project estimates that moving to the Chained CPI would reduce the deficit by about $390 billion in the first decade alone, with roughly one third of the savings from Social Security, another third from increased federal revenue (via inflation-indexed tax provisions such as more slowly growing tax bracket thresholds), and the remaining savings from a combination of other spending programs and reduced interest on the debt. The Congressional Budget Office estimates switching to the chained CPI would save $340 billion.

Applying the chained CPI beginning in 2015 instead of 2014 and accompanying it with "low income protections" would save $230 billion.

== History of proposals and controversy ==
In 1996, the Advisory Committee to Study the Consumer Price Index (the Boskin Commission) estimated that in 1996 CPI-W (used to adjust Social Security) over-estimated inflation 1.1 percent. The BLS responded by making changes to the CPI-U and CPI-W, which included an adjustment to compensate for upper-level substitution bias, performed each January of an even-numbered year. In 2002 BLS created the Chained CPI (C-CPI-U) that provides more frequent monthly adjustment for substitution bias.

Proponents of the chained CPI include the Committee for a Responsible Federal Budget and The Heritage Foundation. It is also included in the recommendations of various bipartisan commissions designed to reduce the deficit such as Simpson–Bowles, Domenici–Rivlin, and the Gang of Six.

In 2012 and 2013 as part of the fiscal cliff negotiations, President Obama repeatedly proposed the application of chained CPI to social security benefits as a way to address budgetary shortfalls. This position was controversial with many, including Democrats and Social Security advocacy groups.

Some oppose the measure for the reason that changing inflation metrics to the Chained CPI would inappropriately cut the growth in benefits under programs like Social Security and Supplemental Security Income. Opponents include the AARP the American Federation of Government Employees, the AFL–CIO and Social Security Works. They claim that the current CPI used for the elderly understates the inflation seniors experience, primarily because the elderly purchase more medical care than younger people, and medical care inflation has exceeded inflation in the rest of the economy.

The Congressional Budget Office said in 1998 that the CPI metric used for cost of living adjustments "grows faster than the cost of living".

According to the Committee for a Responsible Federal Budget, “moving to the Chained CPI would address this by using a superlative [chained] index that updates expenditure weights and formulas in order to address consumer response to substitutions between categories.”

Since 2000 the Chained CPI has on average measured inflation between 0.25 and 0.3 percentage points lower than CPI-U and CPI-W. Opponents of the change note that while the difference is small, it compounds over time, making the reduction in outlays for COLAs for Social Security larger when looked at over a long time horizon.

Opponents also claim that using CPI-W to adjust retirement benefits like Social Security does not properly estimate inflation for seniors, because the elderly have consumption patterns different from urban wage earners and clerical workers (studied for CPI-W). For example, the elderly consume roughly double the medical care of all urban consumers (studied for CPI-U and C-CPI-U) and urban wage earners and clerical workers (for CPI-W); inflation in medical care has exceeded that in much of the rest of the economy. To adjust for this, the BLS computes a consumer price index for the elderly (CPI-E).

However, the CPI-E as an index has a number of flaws. For one, it covers a very small sample size and is in reality just a subset of the CPI-U rather than its own index. More importantly, there is substantial controversy about whether the CPI appropriately measures health care cost inflation – a problem which is particularly pronounced in the CPI-E. As CBO explains, it is unclear “whether the cost of living actually grows at a faster rate for the elderly than for younger people… Some research suggests that BLS underestimates the rate of improvement in the quality of health care and that such improvement may be reducing the true price of health care by more than 1 percent a year. If that is the case, then all versions of the CPI overstate growth in the cost of living, with the overstatement especially large for the CPI-E."

Chained CPI has moreover been criticized for its disproportionate impact on women who live longer, but typically have less savings than men. Concerns have also been raised regarding the impact of chained CPI on veterans, and persons with disabilities. The argument is that because veterans and the disabled collect benefits before retirement age, they would stand to lose a more significant share of income from Social Security and other programs over time. Furthermore, Chained CPI has been depicted as a regressive piece of social policy, as persons earning between $30,000 and $40,000 will be disproportionately impacted by the lowering of the inflation adjustment for income.

Percent of tax units with a tax increase (based on 2012 policy)

== Distribution effect ==
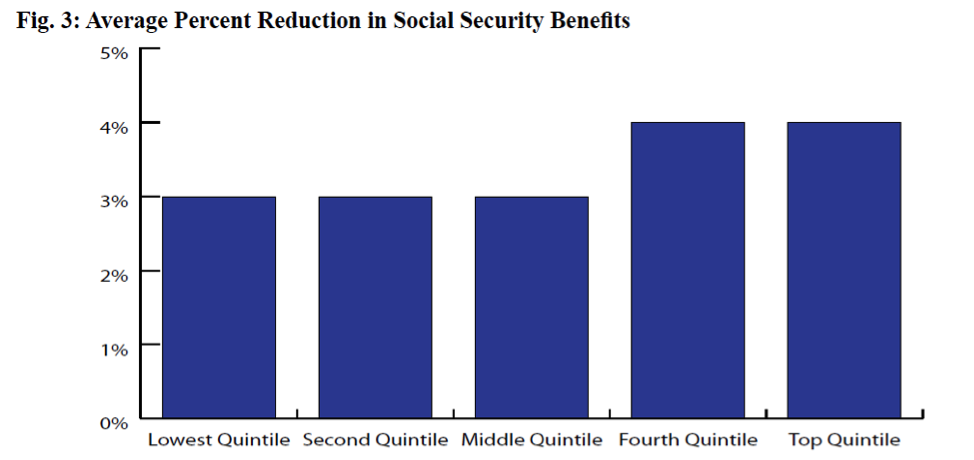
Average percent reduction in Social Security benefits (as of 2012)

Moving to the chained CPI would reduce Social Security benefits by 3% for the bottom 60% of Social Security recipients and 4% for the top 40% of beneficiaries (per estimates for 2050 from the Social Security Administration in 2011).

The Tax Policy Center estimated that changing to the Chained CPI would increase the taxes paid by 30% of the bottom 20% of the income distribution, 70% of the next 20% of the population, and nearly all of the people in the top 60% of the income distribution.
