= Leo Törnqvist =

Finnish statistician (1911–1983)

- Born: Leo Waldemar Törnqvist; 14 February 1911
- Died: 18 April 1983 (aged 72)
- Known for: Törnqvist index
- Scientific career
- Fields: Statistics
- Institutions: University of Helsinki

Leo Waldemar Törnqvist (14 February 1911 – 18 April 1983) was one of the first professors of statistics in Finland, and the first to achieve international recognition. He taught at the University of Helsinki from 1943 to 1974, and developed techniques that are used in official price and productivity statistics.

== Life, education, and career ==
Törnqvist was born on 14 February 1911 in Jeppo, a Swedish-speaking village in Finland. He studied mathematics, physics, and chemistry at Åbo Akademi University in Turku, where his interests shifted to economics and statistics under the influence of Swedish economist Arthur Montgomery. He finished his studies in Turku in 1933 and continued with graduate work in mathematics at Stockholm University, earning a doctorate in 1937 under the supervision of Harald Cramér and Gunnar Myrdal.

After a short-term teaching position at Åbo Akademi University from 1937 to 1938, he began his career working for the Finnish railway service from 1938 until 1943. He was appointed as an associate professor of statistics at the University of Helsinki in 1943 and promoted to full professor in 1950. In the early 1950s he visited researchers in the US and, in the early 1960s, worked as a consultant for the United Nations in Indonesia.

He died on 18 April 1983.

== Contributions ==
Törnqvist developed an approach to creating weighted price indexes across discrete time periods using weighted averages of growth rates in prices where the weights were quantity averages across the two periods, in work he did with the Bank of Finland published in 1936. These Törnqvist indexes are used in official price and productivity statistics in many countries. In a 1949 work, he also made "the first serious attempt to describe population forecasting from a stochastic point of view", providing "seminal works" in Bayesian inference in demography.

As a professor at the University of Helsinki, his students included economist Timo Teräsvirta. His student Vieno Rajaoja was the first Finnish woman to earn a doctorate in statistics, in 1958.

== Recognition ==
Törnqvist was elected member of the Finnish Society of Sciences and Letters in 1956, fellow of the Econometric Society in 1951, and member of the International Statistical Institute in 1956. He was decorated Commander of the Order of the Lion of Finland in 1961, and given honorary doctorates by the University of Helsinki in 1971 and by Åbo Akademi University in 1978.

== Family ==
In about 1981, Törnqvist bought a VIC-20 and asked his daughter Anna's son, Linus Torvalds, to help him program it. Törnqvist wrote out BASIC language programs, and grandson Linus, aged about eleven, typed them in. "He wanted me to share in the experience [and] get me interested in math," wrote Torvalds later. These were Linus's first programming experiences. Ten years later, Torvalds began to write the Linux kernel.

Leo Törnqvist's brother was diplomat Erik Törnqvist. His son was the nuclear physicist Nils Arthur Törnqvist (1938–2018).
