= Wärtsilä Marine =

Defunct Finnish shipbuilding company (1987-89)

- Native name: Wärtsilä Meriteollisuus; Wärtsilä Marinindustri
- Type: Osakeyhtiö
- Industry: Shipbuilding
- Founded: 1 January 1987
- Defunct: 23 October 1989
- Fate: Bankruptcy
- Successor: Masa-Yards
- Headquarters: Finland
- Number of locations: Helsinki, Turku
- Key people: Pekka Laine; Ingmar Ingvesgård
- Owner: Wärtsilä, Valmet

Wärtsilä Marine (Finnish: Wärtsilä Meriteollisuus; Swedish: Wärtsilä Marinindustri) was a Finnish shipbuilding company.

The company was created in 1987 in order to improve shipbuilding productivity by combining the Wärtsilä and Valmet yards under the same organisation. The yards were located in Helsinki and Turku. The company fell in a scandalous bankruptcy in 1989.

The operation was continued after under name Masa-Yards.

== Background ==
During the 1970s and 1980s the European shipbuilding suffered of a too high capacity and unhealthy competition. The Asian shipbuilders had grown fast and taken over a large part of the market. Combination of increasing salary costs and price dumping lead to an untenable situation for many European shipbuilders. Swedish shipbuilders had faced difficulties already in the 1970s and the yards had been kept alive through massive subsidies.

Due to Soviet exports, the Finnish shipbuilders were working in a fairly good level until the 1980s. The five-year-plan of 1981–1985 guaranteed the vital basic load for the Finnish yards, but the plan of 1986–1990 meant the end of the golden era for the Soviet export. The Soviets negotiated very low prices for the few ships included in the plan, and the ordered quantity remained even much lower. The ships made for Soviet Union had been included in the bilateral agreement between the two countries and it was getting out of balance, as the Soviet export to Finland reduced drastically. In order to maintain the employment in its shipyards the Finnish government decided to deliver the ships to Soviet Union for credit.

== Foundation of Wärtsilä Marine ==
In 1986 the two main shipbuilders of Finland, Wärtsilä and Valmet, agreed about putting together their shipbuilding business units and close the least competitive ones, which meant the Valmet yards. As a part of the reorganisation Wärtsilä separated its diesel engine building operations in Turku and Vaasa from the shipbuilding organisation to a separate business unit, Wärtsilä Diesel Oy. The ownership of the new shipbuilding company was shared so that 30% went for Valmet and 70% for Wärtsilä. Wärtsilä's paper machine industry was moved to Valmet as a payment. At the beginning the state gave a FIM 700 million tax relief.

The number of employees had been gradually reduced by the 1980s. The Perno shipyard in Turku offered an early retirement for personnel of aged 56 years and over.

The new company was started officially at the beginning of 1987. The name of the company was Wärtsilä Meriteollisuus Oy in Finnish, Wärtsilä Marinindustri Ab in Swedish and internationally was used name Wärtsilä Marine. The manager was Pekka Laine.

Martin Saarikangas, the manager of Wärtsilä Helsinki Shipyard, was against the merger; he did not believe in the future of the Soviet trade and Saarikangas had worked hard to get projects from west in order to reduce Wärtsilä's dependency on Soviet exports. Only about 25% of Wärtsilä's sales went to Soviet Union, whereas Valmet yards were virtually entirely dependent on Soviet exports. Instead of merger, Saarikangas suggested reorganising of Wärtsilä yards to be able to cope in the market. But the top management, however, did not share Saarikangas's views, and despite being appointed the Vice President of Wärtsilä Marine, he was relocated to United States.

== New orders ==
At very first Laine made a new agreement with the Soviet Sudoimport about moving partly of a project with nine ships from Valmet yards to Wärtsilä Perno shipyard. Two of the ships were started at Valmet Laivateollisuus yard in Turku and one at Vuosaari shipyard in Helsinki; the yards were planned to be closed after handing over of the ships. Wärtsilä Marine got an order of 70,000 GT cruise ship from Carnival Cruise Lines (CCL). The contract included an option for two sister ships and the ships were planned to be built in Wärtsilä Helsinki yard. Still in January, Marine got another order from Norwegian company Kloster Cruise A/S for a 37,800 GT cruise ship; the delivery was scheduled for November 1988. In the following month the Swedish Rederi Ab Slite ordered a 40,000 GT cruiseferry for route between Finland and Sweden; also this contract included an option for a sister ship, which was signed in the following July. Also CCL used its option for the two additional 70,000 GT cruiseferries in the following September. A new order followed in October, when Effoa ordered a 58,000 GT cruise ferry for Helsinki – Stockholm -route, including an option for a sister ship, which was ordered in March 1988.

== Weaknesses ==
The suddenly grown order book put Wärtsilä Marine at the front of new challenges, and the company's structural weaknesses came out.

The capital of the company was FIM 1.5 billion in total. The share of Wärtsilä was FIM 1.05 billion and Valmet held FIM 450 million. However, the capital consisted 90% of fixed property, such as the real estate and equipment, and just FIM 150 million in cash.

The second problem came from Soviet-ordered ships which were inherited from Valmet; the calculations showed in 1987 that these ships would cause losses of FIM 200–400 million. This was partly explained by mistakes in calculations, but partly also a conscious choice made in name of employment.

The third problem came from the cruise ships ordered by CCL; it turned out that also their construction costs were calculated wrong. It is not known if the reason was a consciously miscalculation, or were the costs of the demanding ships underestimated. The state had guaranteed the projects up to FIM 600 million of losses. However, it is notable that CCL would have most likely got the ships for cheaper from a subsidised yard somewhere else in Europe, but CCL selected Wärtsilä due to its good reputation as a cruise ship builder.

The fourth problem came from lack of employees. Wärtsilä, and later Wärtsilä Marine, had reduced the personnel heavily in 1985–1988. The company had to use subcontractors for high costs. The lack of employees caused strikes in particular in Perno yard.

== Disclosure of financial troubles ==
During its first operating year, 1987, Wärtsilä Marine made FIM 205 million of losses, which was expected.

The truth about the Valmet contract with Soviet Union started to come out during 1988. Despite the losses, Wärtsilä Marine did its utmost to be able to deliver the ordered craft to Soviet Union, because it wanted to maintain the long-term business partnership. The Valmet Laivateollisuus yard in Turku was closed and the work was moved to Rauma-Repola and Hollming yards, where the work was performed as subcontracting and high costs. More losses came from Monterey project, which included converting an old American freight ship into cruise ship in the old Wärtsilä Turku shipyard.

In the same year Pekka Laine left his position in Wärtsilä Marine and moved to the parent Wärtsilä. Kari Airaksinen became the new manager of Marine. The result of the year collapsed down to FIM 638 million of losses and Wärtsilä Marine's situation started to look alarming. In the annual report of Wärtsilä Corporation this was formulated: "the Marine division is at the front of increasing changes".

== Rescue efforts ==
The general manager of Wärtsilä Corporation Tor Stolpe resigned at the end of 1988 and Pekka Laine was appointed to his place from beginning of 1989. Laine started frantically pondering a way to save the corporation from the Wärtsilä Marine's losses which were then estimated already one billion Finnish markka. Saarikangas was called back to Finland from the US and reinstalled the head of Helsinki Shipyard; he directly set up a team to start an urgent reorganisation programme. But the time was running out.

The media reported at the beginning of August that Wärtsilä Marine was on the verge of bankruptcy and it could be only saved by urgent support by the state. The owners were not able to support the shipbuilder any more. The state was not willing to help; Bror Wahlroos from the ministry of trade and industry declared that the state refuses becoming owner of Marine.

However, on 10 August the state and Wärtsilä Marine announced a financing plan, in which also two Finnish banks were involved, for carrying out the unfinished shipbuilding projects. Wärtsilä sold 51% of Wärtsilä Marine to Yhdyspankki, Oy Pomi Trading Ab, Wärtsilä pension fund and Wärtsilä pension foundation.; the total price of the shares was four Finnish markka. After this the ownership of Wärtsilä Corporation had fallen under 19% and therefore it did not have to treat it as subsidiary in the financial statements.

== Bankruptcy ==
On 12 October 1989 the board of Marine suggested declaring the company bankrupt at a general meeting that should be held on 2 November. The current losses were estimated at FIM 1.6 billion. At the same time, the workers of Perno shipyard were striking and demanding a 10% salary increase.

The board of Wärtsilä Marine was called urgently for a meeting on 23 October. The company was operated with a weekly FIM 60 million bills of exchange and its cash reserve was exhausted. The board decided to put the company into immediate bankruptcy, which came into effect at 3:30 pm in the same day.

== Events after the collapse ==
At the same time as the bankruptcy declaration, Saarikangas gave his famous speech to the workers of Helsinki Shipyard. The yard workers and subcontractors, who had suddenly lost their livelihood, were shocked by the news. Saarikangas ended his speech assuring that the bankruptcy would not mean the end of shipbuilding, if the workers would be ready to continue it on new terms.

Directly after his speech, Saarikangas called Ted Arison, the American owner of Carnival Cruise Lines, which had three cruise ships on Wärtsilä Marine's order book. Arison arrived in Finland just eleven hours later; this was followed by a number of meetings and negotiations with creditors and other parties. Just four days later Saarikangas set up a new company, Helsinki New Shipyard. The financial basis for finalising the unfinished ships was ensured by a letter of intent signed by Arison. The Turku yard was restarted in the same manner, under name Turku New Shipyard. Both yards were organised under a new company Masa-Yards on 9 November 1987, with "Masa" coming from Martin Saarikangas's name.

Saarikangas has subsequently said that the restarting of the yards would not have been possible without the help of Ted Arison.

== Aftermath ==
Saarikangas found the bankruptcy unnecessary, claiming it was just based on shortage of liquidity, as the company was about to receive a payment for Cinderella, and a couple of months later CCL would have made an 80% payment for the cruise ship Fantasy. On the other hand, he thought that the bankruptcy was, although theoretically avoidable, still the easiest way to restructure the company; Saarikangas re-hired almost all the blue-collar workers, though only two-thirds of the white collars.

== Affected vessels ==
=== Helsinki shipyard ===
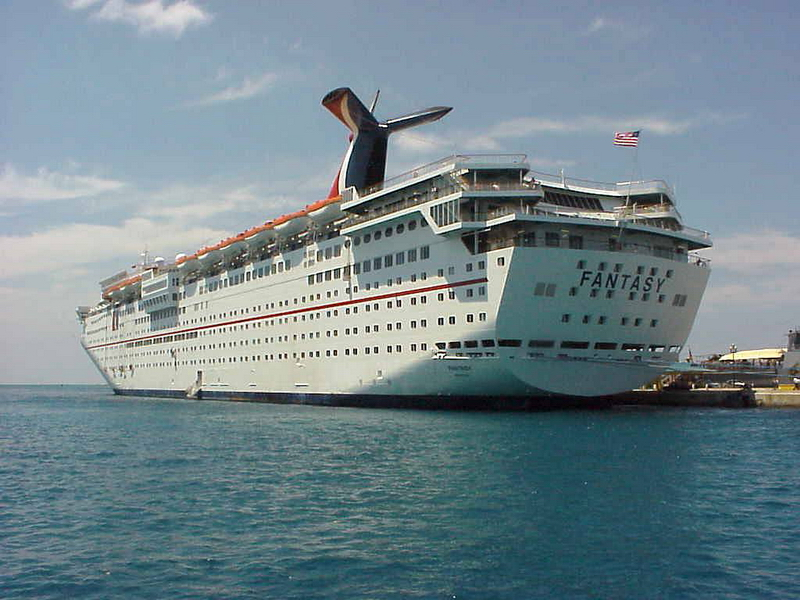
NB 479, Fantasy, was at the outfitting quay and nearly finished.

=== Perno shipyard ===
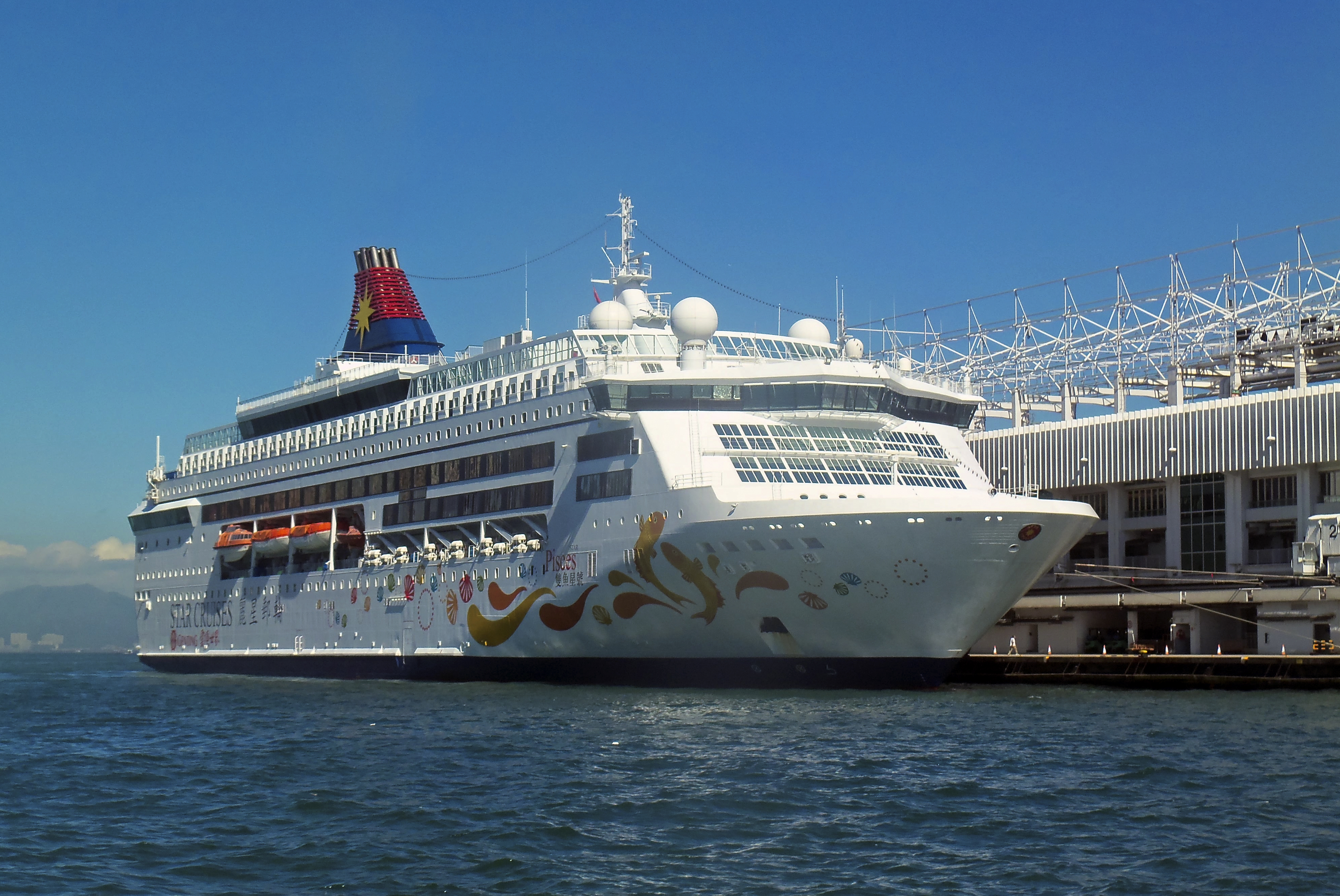
NB 1298, Kalypso, was at the outfitting quay.

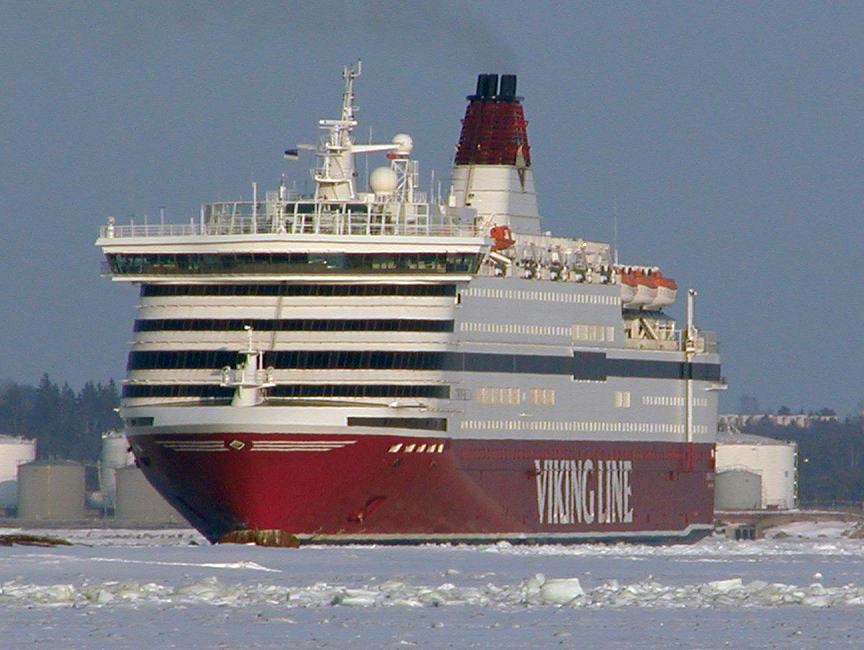
NB 1302, Cinderella, was at the outfitting quay.

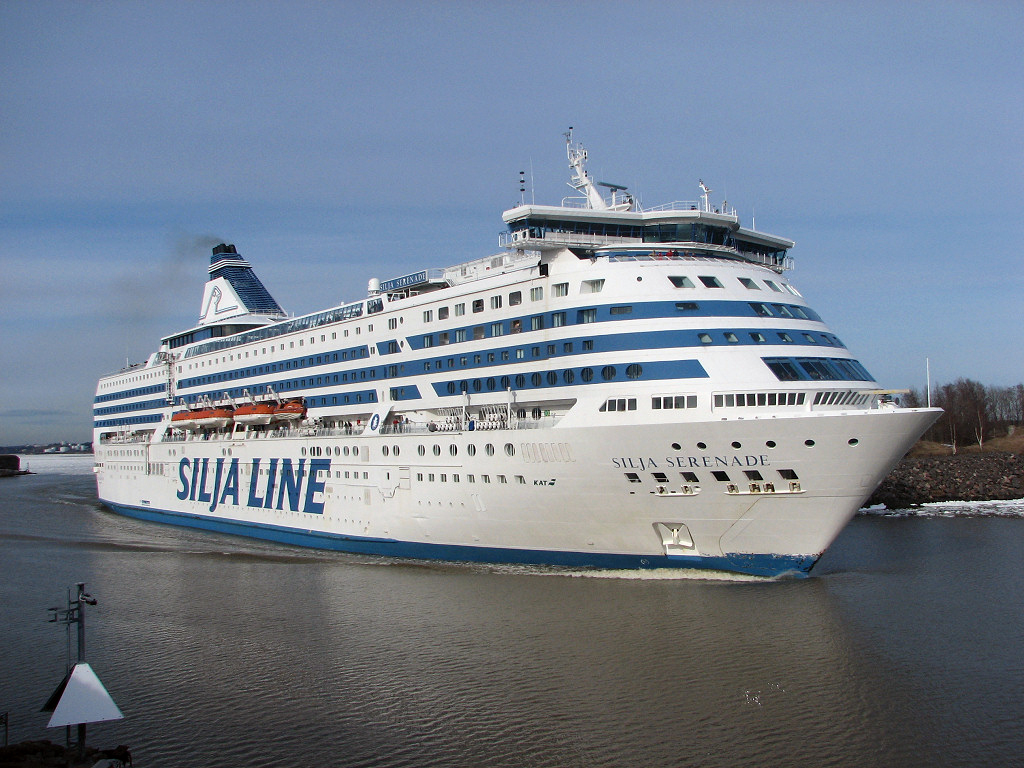
NB 1301, Silja Serenade, was under construction in dry dock but not launched.

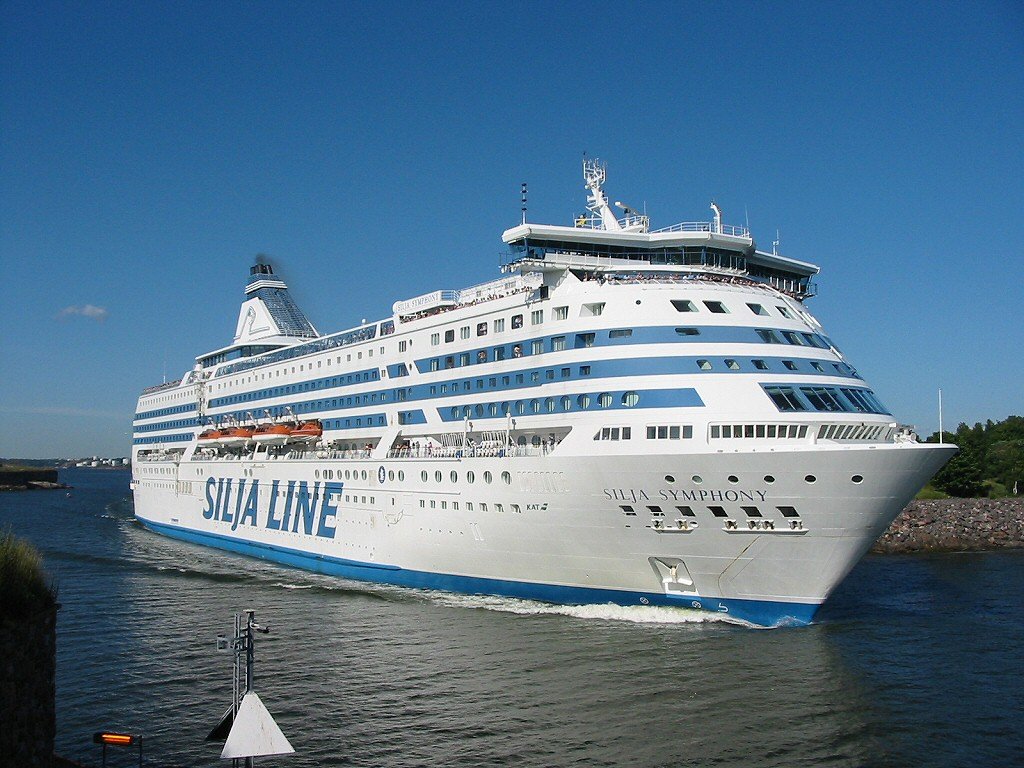
Construction of NB 1309, Silja Symphony, was started.

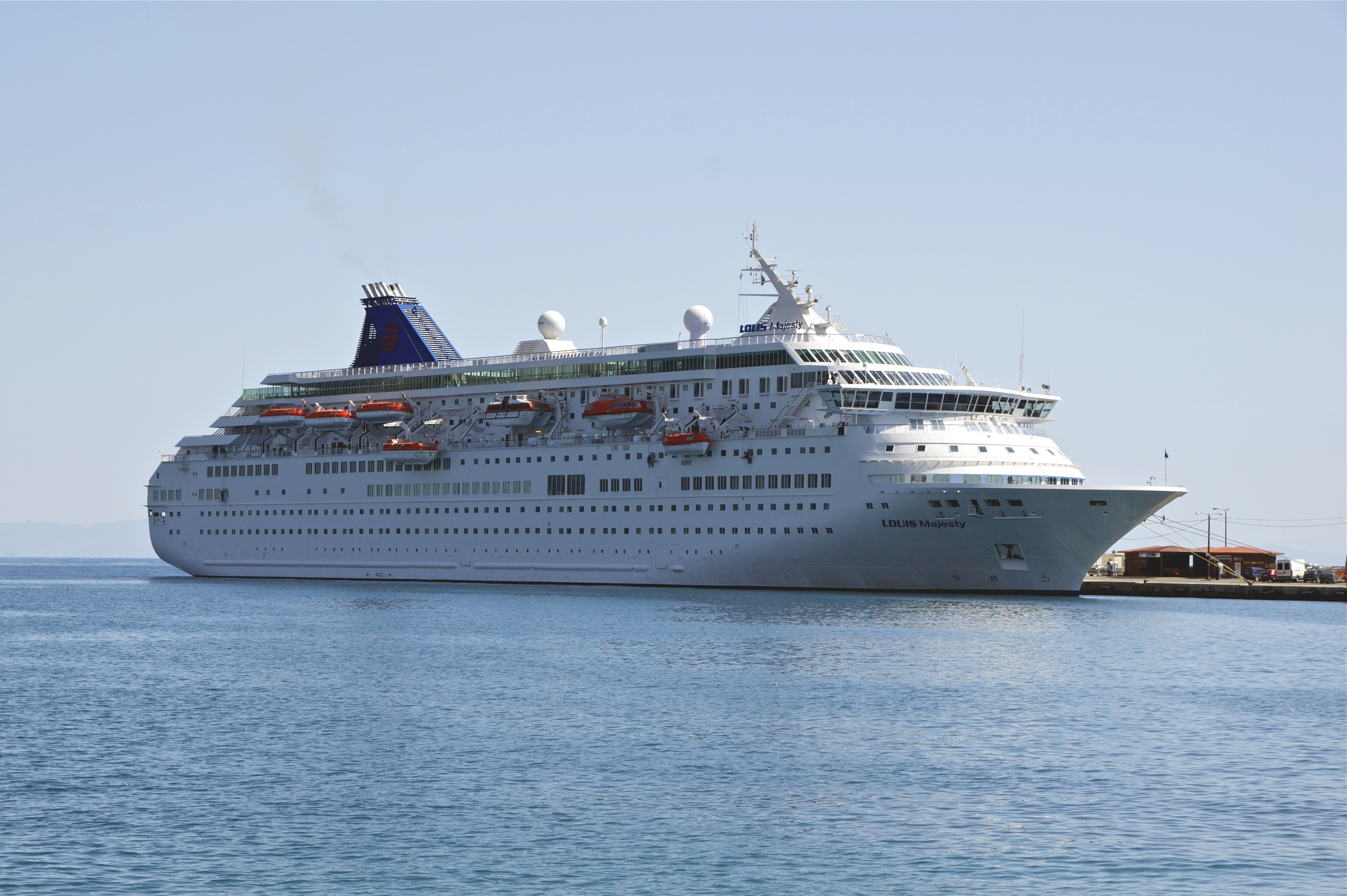
Construction of NB 1323, Royal Majesty, was started.

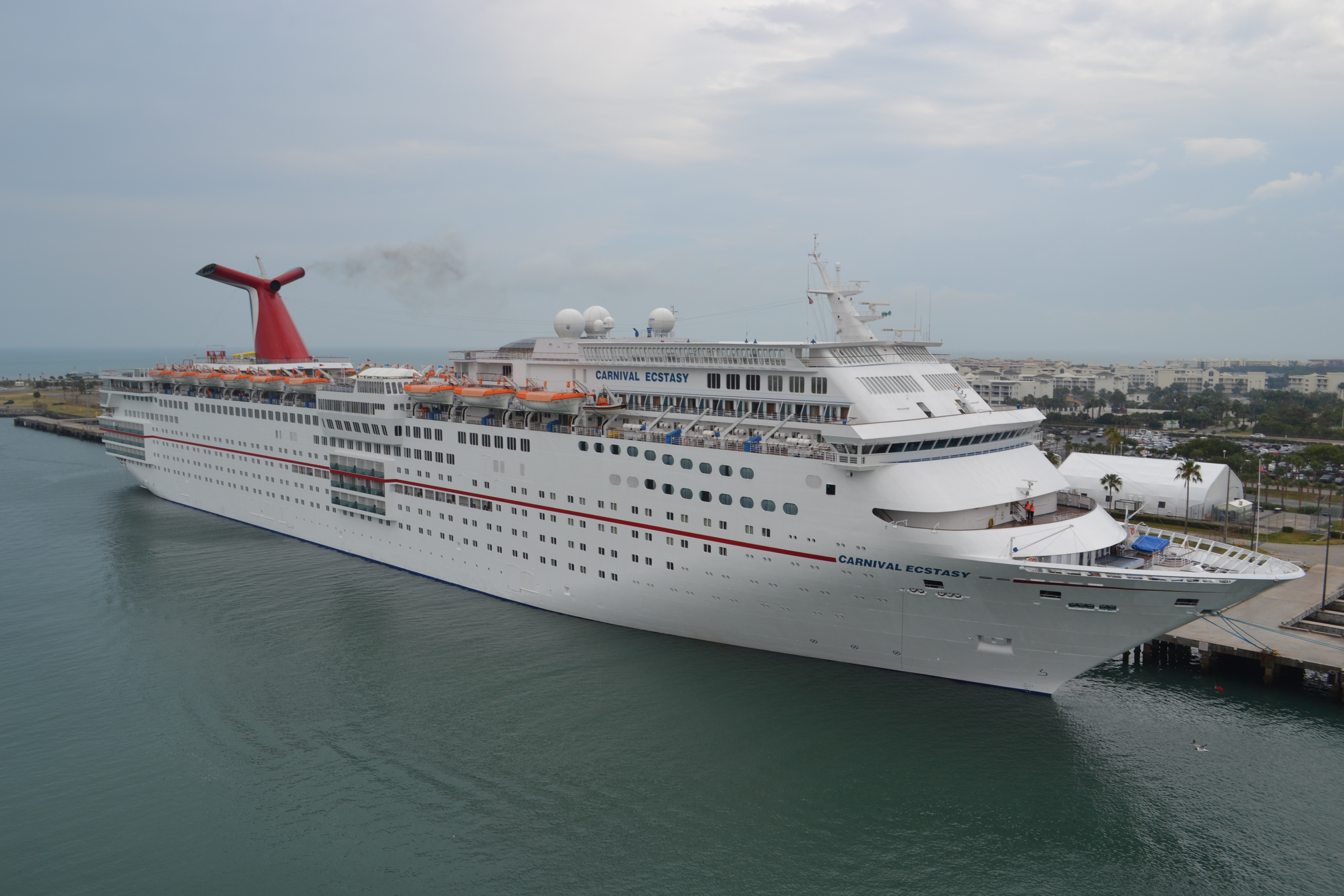
NB 1299, Ecstasy, was on drawing board and finally constructed at Helsinki as NB 480.

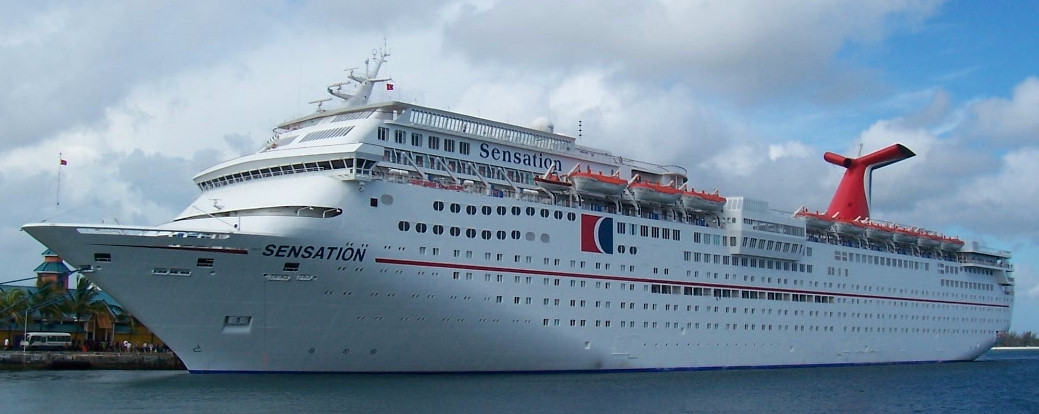
NB 1300, Sensation, was on drawing board and finally built at Helsinki as NB 484.

== Sources ==
- von Knorring, Nils (1995). Aurajoen veistämöt ja telakat (in Finnish). Espoo, Finland: Schildts Förlags Ab. ISBN 951-50-0735-6.
