= Ovako =

Swedish steel manufacturer

Ovako Group AB
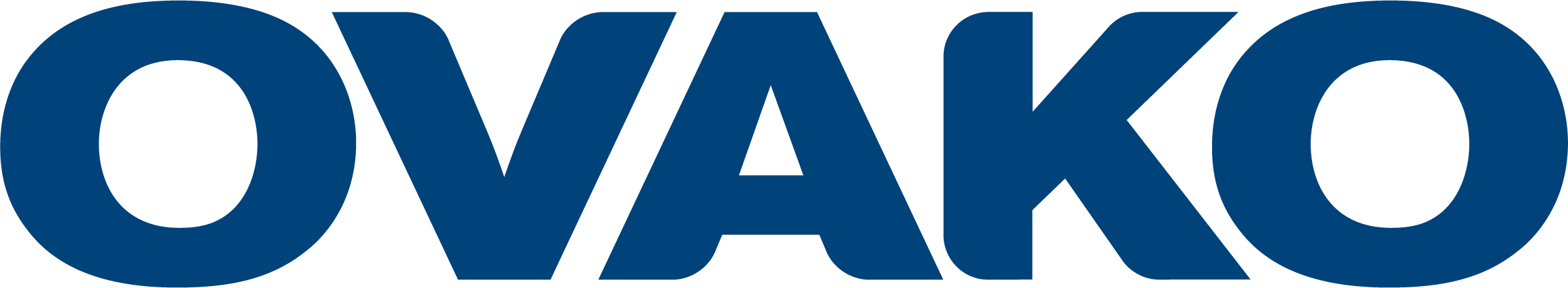
- Type: Limited company
- Industry: Steel
- Founded: 2005
- Headquarters: Stockholm, Sweden
- Area served: Worldwide
- Key people: Marcus Hedblom (President and CEO); Mr Katsuhiro Miyamoto (Chairman of the Board)
- Products: Steel bars, seamless steel tubes, steel rings, wire rod and further-processed steel products
- Brands: BQ-Steel® IQ-Steel® M-Steel® WR-Steel® SZ-Steel®
- Revenue: ▼SEK 10,192.8 million (2024)
- Operating income: ▼SEK 678.0 million (2024)
- Net income: ▼SEK 487.1 million (2024)
- Owner: Sanyo Special Steel (100%)
- Number of employees: 2,682 (2024)
- Parent: Sanyo Special Steel
- Subsidiaries: Ovako AB; Ovako Bar AB; Ovako Bright Bar Holdings AB; Ovako Cromax AB; Ovako Hallstahammar AB; Ovako Sweden AB; Ovako Finland Oy Ab; Ovako Imatra Oy Ab; Ovako Molinella S.p.A. Ovako Redon SAS; Ovako France SAS; Ovako GmbH; Ovako Ltd. Ovako Polska Sp. z o.o. Ovako North America Inc. Ovako Steel Marketing AB; Ovako (Shanghai) Special Steel Trading Co., Ltd.
- Website: ovako.com

Ovako Group AB is a European steel group headquartered in Stockholm, Sweden, specializing in engineering steel for the bearing, transport and manufacturing industries. Its production is primarily based on recycled steel and includes bars, tubes, rings, wire and further-processed steel products. Ovako operates in more than 30 countries, with sales offices across Europe, North America and Asia. Ovako is one of the world's largest manufacturers of seamless tubes for the bearing industry.

Since March 2019, Ovako has been a subsidiary of the Japanese steel manufacturer Sanyo Special Steel and is part of the Nippon Steel Corporation group.

== Operations ==
Ovako produces bars, tubes, rings and pre-components. Ovako also produces steels for mining, rock drilling and construction applications. The company has 8 production sites in Sweden, Finland, Germany and Italy, and several sales companies in Europe, Asia and the United States.

Ovako steel is made from recycled steel scrap that is then refined and transformed into products such as hot-rolled or cold-rolled bars with various profiles and forms of processing, tubes, rings and pre-components.

Ovako's customers are primarily the European engineering industry and its subcontractors, for example makers of trucks, contracting plant and industrial applications, the mining industry and the wind power industry. The majority of Ovako's products are sold to customers in Europe but steel is also exported to North America and Asia.

The number of employees is 2 682 (2024). Operations are divided into three business areas: Hofors-Hällefors, Smedjebacken-Boxholm and Imatra.

Marcus Hedblom has been CEO of Ovako since 2015. The chairman of Ovako's board of directors is Mr Katsuhiro Miyamoto.

== Products ==
Ovako operates on the market for long, low alloy steel products. The majority of production consists of bars, tubes and rings that are used in items such as ball bearings, products for the automotive industry, hydraulic cylinders and rock drills.

Ovako specialises in steel with a high degree of purity and low oxygen content, steel with improved machining properties and boron steel with high abrasion resistance. Ovako is Europe's biggest manufacturer of piston rods for the hydraulics industry via its CROMAX group of companies. These are low carbon, hard chromium-plated rods of high-strength steel.

== Production sites ==
Ovako has 8 production sites: Boxholm, Hallstahammar, Hofors, Hällefors and Smedjebacken in Sweden, Imatra in Finland, Molinella in Italy and Redon in France. The company also has sales offices in a number of countries worldwide.

== History ==
Ovako's production is a further development of some of the ironworks set up in Sweden in the 17th and 18th centuries in places such as Hofors, Boxholm and Hällefors. The ironworks gradually grew into major industrial centers and subsequently belonged to the companies that merged to form Ovako today.

1900s-1950s

Ball bearing steel was produced in Sweden at the beginning of the 20th century. In 1916, SKF acquired Hofors Bruk, followed in 1958 by Hellefors Bruk. 1935 saw the start of production of steel in Imatra, Finland, where Ovako still operates today, as it does in Hofors and Hällefors.

1960s-1970s

The steel industry developed, and new technology meant that it was possible to produce steel of higher quality in a shorter time. The predecessors of what is Ovako today gradually began to focus production on special steel. During the same period, the steelworks in Smedjebacken, Hofors and Imatra supplied increasing volumes of steel to the automotive and engineering industries.

In 1969, the Finnish steel companies Oy Vuoksenniska Ab and Oy Fiskars Ab formed a joint company: Ovako. In 1972, Wärtsilä became a shareholder in the company.

1980s-1990s

In 1981, Smedjebackens Walsverk and Boxholms AB merged to form Smedjebacken-Boxholm Stål AB. In 1988, the company was acquired by Welbond, which subsequently changed its name to Fundia.

In 1986, Ovako Steel was formed via a merger of SKF Steel and Ovako. In 1991, SKF became sole owner of Ovako Steel, while operations in Imatra continued under the name Imatra Steel. In the same year, Fundia was acquired by Rautaruukki Oy and Norsk Jern Holding A/S.

2000s-2010s

In 2005, the present company Ovako was formed via a merger of Fundia, Ovako Steel and Imatra Steel. The company was owned jointly by Rautaruukki, SKF and Wärtsila. In 2006, Ovako was sold to Pampus Industrie Beteiligungen and the Dutch investors Hombergh Holdings BV and WP de Pundert Ventures BV. In 2007, Pampus Industrie Beteiligungen became the sole owner.

In 2010, Ovako was sold to Triton, which took over everything except the wire rod division from the company.

In 2018 Ovako was sold to Nippon Steel.

2020s

In 2020, Ovako demonstrated the first use of hydrogen to heat steel before rolling. As of January 2022, Ovako counterbalances all remaining CO_{2} emissions from Scope 1 and Scope 2 with carbon offset and is therefore the first steel producer in the world with carbon neutral operation. On the 5th of September 2023, Ovako's hydrogen plant in Hofors was inaugurated by the Swedish Prime Minister Ulf Kristersson. The hydrogen plant is the world's first facility for producing fossil-free hydrogen to heat steel prior to rolling. This reduces emissions from this production step to nearly zero, with only water as a byproduct.

== Management ==
- Marcus Hedblom, President & CEO
- Erik Bohman, CFO, EVP Group Finance, IT & Purchasing
- Phetra Ericsson, EVP Group HR, Communication & EHS
- Mathias Tillman, EVP Group Sales & Marketing
- Rickard Qvarfort, President BU Hofors-Hellefors
- Klaus Enwald, President BU Imatra
- Yoshihisa Ohtsu, EVP Group Production & Technology Advisor
- Nicholas Källsäter, President BU Smedjebacken-Boxholm
