= Nordek =

Failed proposed organization for Nordic economic cooperation

Nordek (in Swedish: Organisationen för nordiskt ekonomiskt samarbete. In Danish and Norwegian: Nordøk for Nordisk økonomi. In Finnish: Pohjoismaiden talousalue) was a planned organisation for Nordic economic cooperation similar to the European Economic Community EEC, based on a proposal in 1968 by Danish Prime Minister Hilmar Baunsgaard. A treaty was negotiated to establish the new organisation, to be headquartered in Malmö, Sweden. Ultimately, Finland did not ratify the treaty due to its relationship with the Soviet Union. Then Denmark joined EEC and Sweden, Norway, Finland, and Iceland signed bilateral free trade treaties with the EEC.

== See also ==
- Nordic Council
