= Robert Mattson (businessman) =

Finnish businessman (1851–1935)

commercial counsellor Robert Emanuel Mattson
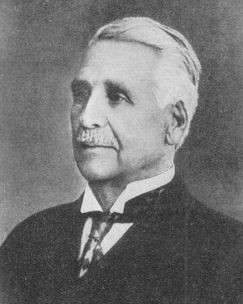
- Born: 16 May 1851; Vårdö, Åland, Grand Duchy of Finland
- Died: 10 May 1935 (aged 83); Helsinki, Finland
- Education: shipmaster
- Board member of: Ab Naxos Prince (1925–); Sandvikens Skeppsdocka och Mekaniska Verkstads Ab (1928–1929)
- Spouse(s): 1884–1915: Amanda Gustava née Savander; 1916→: Sonja née Bergroth (formerly Tschaplin)
- Parent(s): Mats Mattson and Serafia Elisabeth Matsdotter
- Awards: commercial counsellor 1919

Robert Emanuel Mattson (16 May 1851 – 10 May 1935) was a Finnish shipowner and businessman.

Mattson was born in Åland to a shipowner family. He went to sea at young age and studied shipmaster degree. After ten years at sea he settled in Mariehamn and started trading; soon he went into shipping business. Mattson operated solely old sailing ships, which were often lost due to their poor condition. However, the business was profitable. In the 1920s Mattson changed to steam ships but could not operate them successfully.

Mattson became a major owner of Helsinki-based Kone- ja Siltarakennus engineering company. The company grew rapidly but by the 1930s it had fallen into financial problems. Also Mattson's personal financial situation weakened, and following to his death, the company's main creditor sold his shares.

== Early years ==
Mattson was born in Vårdö, Åland. His father Mats Mattson was a shipowner and locally influential business person. At the age of 16 Mattson, against his father's will, became sailor. He studied in Mariehamn Sailing School graduating shipmaster in 1872, at age of 21. In the same year he made an excursion to UK. Subsequently, Mattson mastered two sailing ships. In 1878, after spending about ten years at sea, Mattson became trader in Mariehamn and he opened another shop in Sund. However, trading was not very profitable because it was not possible to reach large volumes in Mariehamn where were just 500 inhabitants.

== Shipping ==
At the early 1880s Mattson started shipping business first as minor shareholder of various ships, later as sole owner. He bought old, at least quarter of century old sailing ships. By the 1890s steamers started to replace sailing ships and Mattson could obtain good sailing ships for relatively cheap. Until the end of the 19th century Mattson only owned wooden ships; in 1900 he bought majority ownership of two steel-hulled windjammers and one barque.

Mattson became one of the most successful Åland shipowners along with August Troberg and Mathias Lundqvist. While Mattson played with high risk by operating with old craft, his business was so profitable that for a short period at the early 20th century he was the biggest shipowner of Finland – although 15 out of the 30 ships he owned between 1880 and 1920 were lost due to serious sea accidents or they were scuttled. Despite this Mattson still had the largest tonnage amongst Åland shipowners after the First World War. Soon after Mattson gave up shipping with sailing ships; the last one was sold in 1924.

Mattson bought his first steam ship, 4,600-GRT Naxos in 1925. The ship was operated via Helsinki-based company called Ab Naxos Prince which was owned by Mattson family. During the following couple of years the tonnage was grown by three more vessels, and at the end of the 1920s the company became with its 20,000-GRT craft the second biggest line shipping company of Helsinki after FÅA. All of Mattson's ships were over 20 years old and they were used in tramp shipping which was sensitive to economic fluctuations. During the whole time of its operation the company created heavy losses.

== Estate business ==
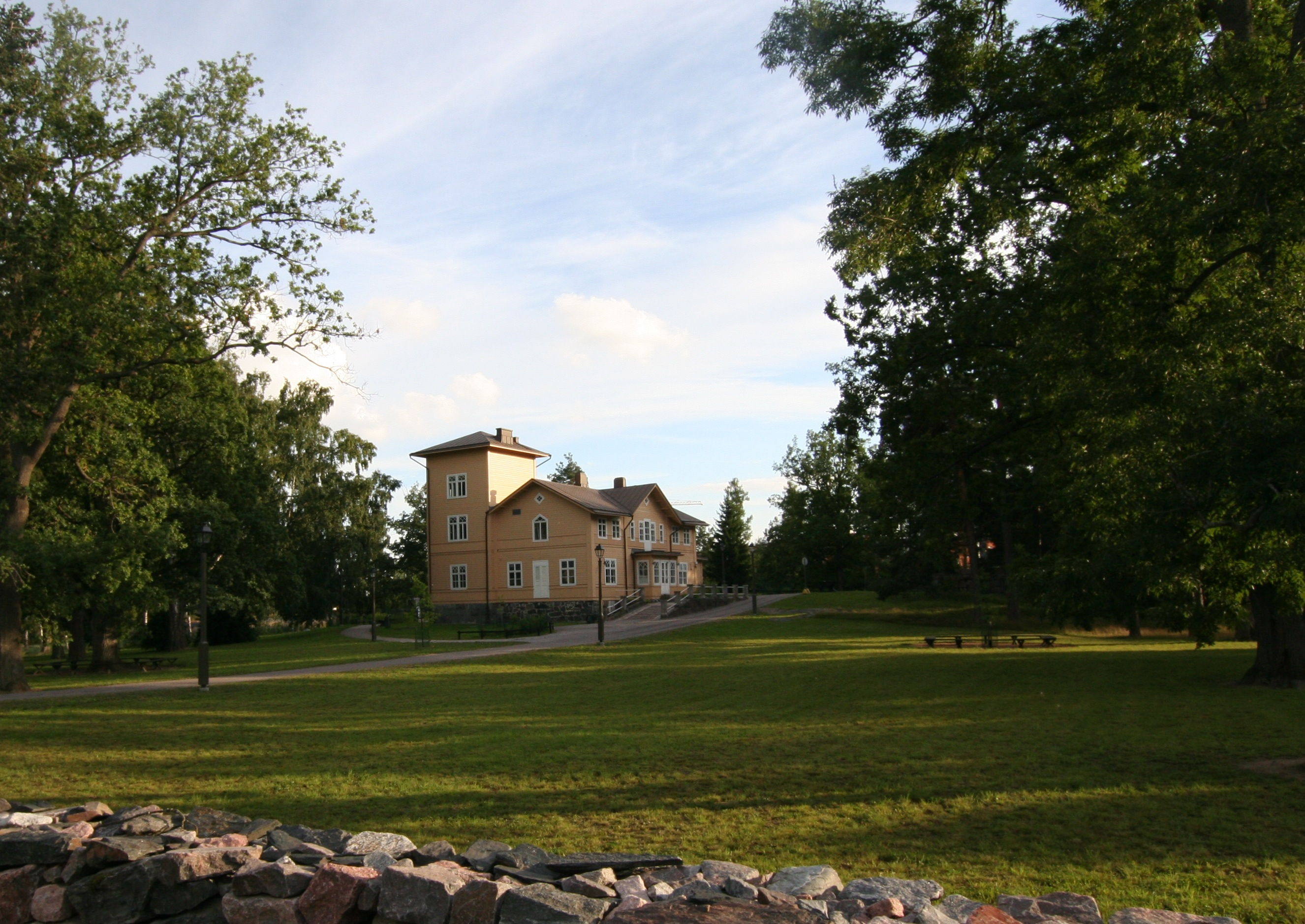
Nordsjö Manor.

Mattson started estate investment in Helsinki in the early 20th century. He owned Königstedt Manor during 1902–1907. Following to the death of his wife Amanda in 1915, Mattson moved permanently to Helsinki. He obtained several real properties and empty lots in Helsinki, most significant being Nordsjö Manor which he bought in 1916.

== Kone- ja Siltarakennus ==
After moving to Helsinki Mattson acquired 50.4% share of engineering company Kone- ja Siltarakennus (Kone ja Silta) which was amongst 30 biggest companies of Finland in number of headcount. The company benefitted from machinery orders by the Finnish forest industry, and its managers Julius Stjernvall and later Robert Lavonius grew the company substantially through acquisitions. By the 1930s Kone ja Silta had become the largest engineering company of Finland, producing locks, separators, ships, bridges and other engineering products.

The rapid growth together with the 1930s recession led to financial problems; Kone ja Silta could not deliver profit, which frustrated Mattson. Mattson was also indebted due to his other businesses, and the company main creditor Pohjoismaiden Yhdyspankki (PYP) closed Mattson's shares into its vault as deposit. Mattson further worsened the situation by nepotism. His son Curt Mattson was a deputy member of the board and his two sons-in-law held manager positions. This led into collision with the operating management.

Mattson died in 1935 after which PYP sold the Kone ja Silta shares to Wärtsilä company which was led by Wilhelm Wahlforss. The acquisition was remarkable because Wärtsilä was much smaller than Kone ja Silta.

== Other businesses ==
Mattson was co-founder of Ålands Sjöfartstidning newspaper which was issued in 1904–1905. He worked as inspector of Åbo Aktiebank Mariehamn office since 1897.

Mattson was member of Mariehamn town council for over ten years, also as a member of board of poor people's caretaking.

== Philanthropy ==
Mattson donated significant sum of 1.2 million marks for founding musicology and folk poetry professorship in Åbo Akademi. It came out just decades later that the professor appointed into the position, Otto Andersson, was Mattson's cousin, and he had formulated his job description himself.

Mattson did not forget his roots; he supported financially renovation of Vårdö church, Åland seamens' mission and schools.

== Personal life and family ==
Mattson is characterised as religious, hardworking and businessman by nature. He was modest and often excessively thrifty.

Mattson was married twice; first to Amanda Gustava née Savander until her death in 1915. In the following year he married Sonja née Bergroth, formerly Tschaplin.
