= Chile–Finland relations =

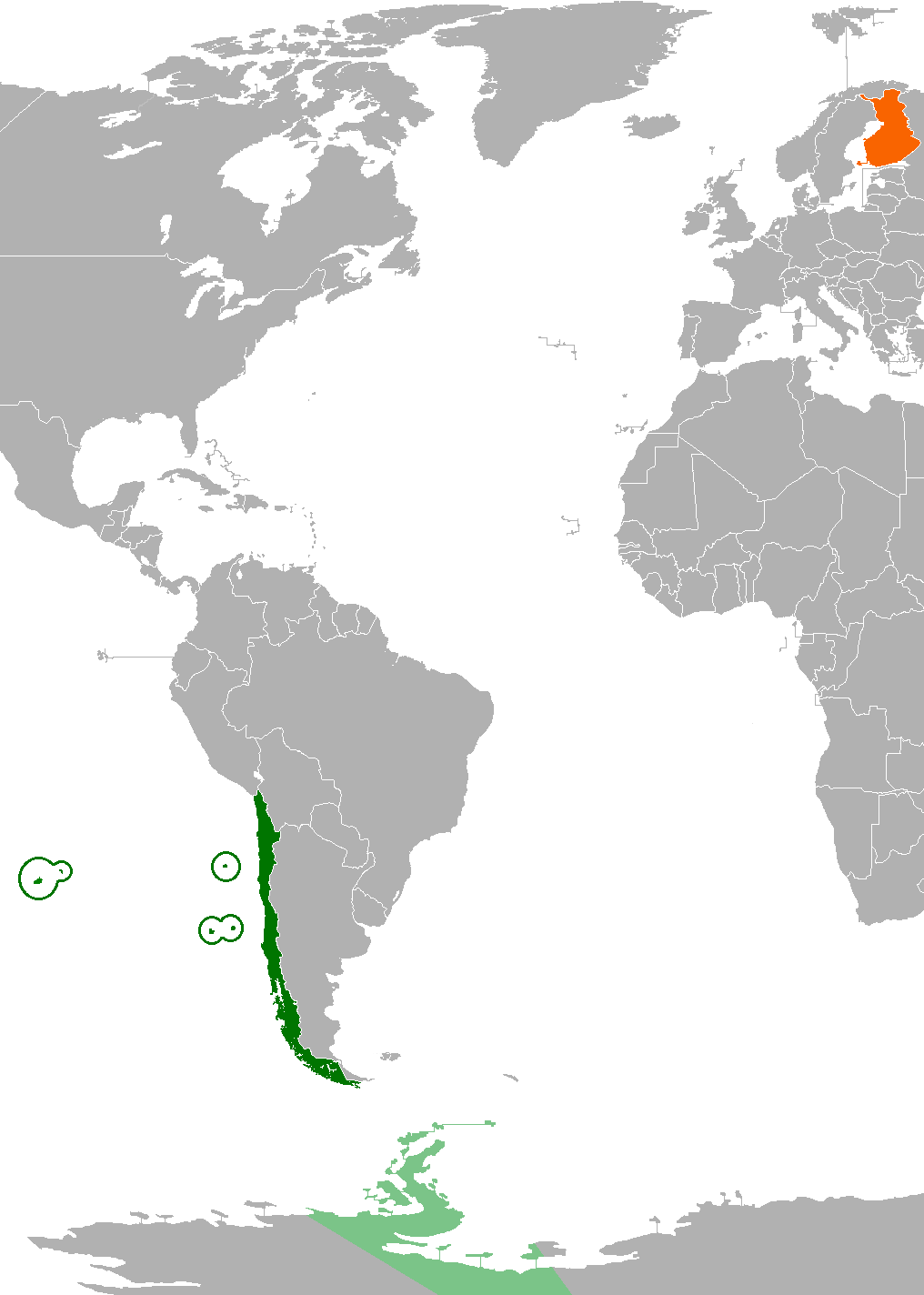
- Chile: Finland

Chile–Finland relations are foreign relations between Chile and Finland. Chile recognised Finland's independence on June 17, 1919. Diplomatic relations between them were established in 1931 and have been continuously maintained, despite pressures at times to discontinue them. The two countries maintain resident ambassadors in both capitals.

== History ==
Finland's first non-resident ambassador to Chile was G.A. Gripenberg, resident in Buenos Aires, Argentina, who was appointed ambassador after diplomatic ties were established on February 20, 1931. Until 1991 Finland was represented in Chile through its embassy in Buenos Aires, Argentina. Permanent representation at a subambassadoral level was first established in the early 1970s.

Initially Chile was represented in Finland through its embassies in Stockholm, Sweden and Oslo, Norway. Lucio Parada Dagnino was appointed resident ambassador in 1991 and Chile opened an embassy in Helsinki in 1991.

Diplomatic relations were maintained throughout World War II despite Finland being allied with the Axis powers. The 1973 Chilean coup d'état and the Pinochet dictatorship brought pressures in both countries to cut off diplomatic ties. Relations were improved following Chilean transition to democracy.

Under Salvador Allende Chile had maintained diplomatic relations with the socialist countries of Eastern Europe, including the German Democratic Republic. After the 1973 Chilean coup these relations were severed. Finland was entrusted with the responsibility of representing the East German interests in Chile.

== State visits ==
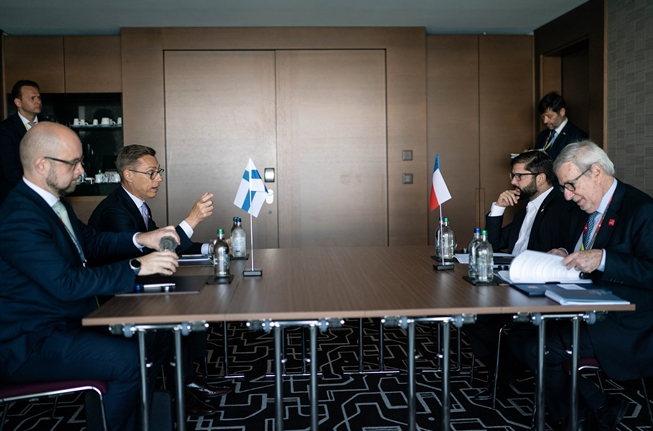
President Gabriel Boric meeting President Alexander Stubb

Three of the four post-Pinochet Chilean presidents have made state visits to Finland, Patricio Aylwin visited Finland in 1993, Ricardo Lagos in 2002 and Michelle Bachelet in 2007. Finnish presidents have made two state visits to Chile, Martti Ahtisaari visited Chile in 1997 and Tarja Halonen in 2003, also attending the inauguration of president Ricardo Lagos in March, 2000.

== Cultural ties ==
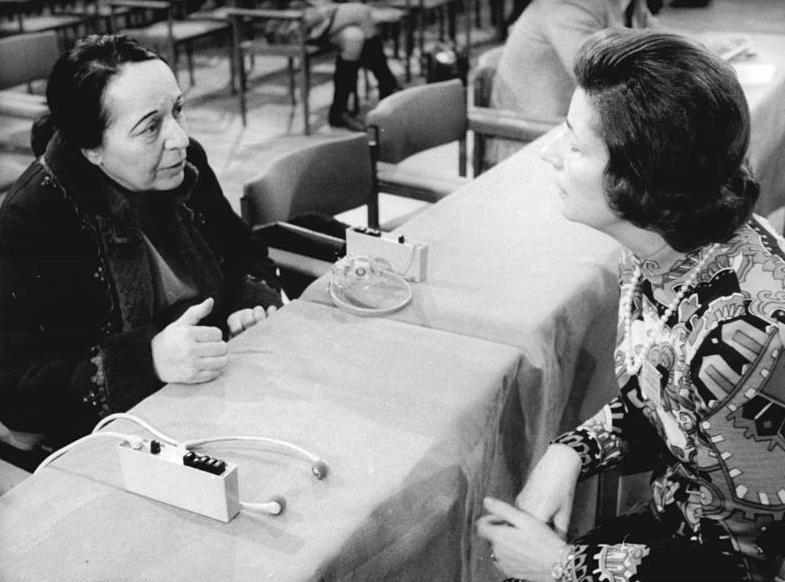
The International Commission of Enquiry into the Crimes of the Military Junta in Chile holding a meeting in Dipoli in Espoo in 1974

The socialist Allende government was an inspiration for left-wing groups in Finland, including the Taistoists. The 1973 coup d'état brought to Finland the first wave of refugees from outside Europe and created a solidarity movement. A Finnish-Chilean friendship society was established in 1973 to support the refugees. Future president Tarja Halonen served as the chairwoman of the society in the 1980s and is its honorary chairman.

The International Commission of Enquiry into the Crimes of the Military Junta in Chile held multiple sessions in Finland, including its first session in 1974 in Dipoli, Espoo and its 4th session in 1976 at the Finlandia Hall in Helsinki.

== Economic relations ==
Direct communication links between Finland and Chile were first established around 1850, when Finnish "Sitka clippers" started serving Russian America and Kamchatka, with regular stops in Valparaíso.

Economic ties between Chile and Finland center around copper and forestry. Chile is the world leader in copper production while Finland has been the world leader in copper smelting en extracting technology. Flash smelting was developed in Finland by Outokumpu in the late 1940s and is now the standard process for refining sulfur-containing ores. Outokumpu has provided technology to the Chilean copper industry from the 1960s and owned 50% of a copper mine in Zadivar. Other companies serving the Chilean mining industry include Metso, Tamrock and Larox and Outotec, formerly the technology division of Outokumpu.

In the early 2000s, Outokumpu was a prospective partner for National Copper Corporation, Codelco in its $1 billion venture to build a copper smelter and refinery in the port city of Mejillones to handle ore from the Chuquicamata mine. The venture was promoted by president Halonen's state visit in 2003.

In May 2009, the Finnish Stora Enso and Chilean Celulosa Arauco y Constitución announced a €253 million deal that would make their joint venture the largest landowner in Uruguay.

In 1993, Finnish researchers were sent to Chile to collect data on logging operations, which began a continued relationship of Finnish-Chilean cooperation on forestry.

In 2003, both countries met several times to discuss business opportunities and "the Chilean economy and investment prospects to major Finnish companies".

=== Trade ===
Chile is the second-largest Latin American trade partner for Finland, after Brazil, with its main import being copper ore, followed by fruits and wines. Chilean copper ore is the main source of foreign ore for the Outokumpu (now Boliden) refinery in Harjavalta. Finnish exports to Chile vary considerably from one year to year, because they are closely related to investments made by the mining and forestry industries in Chile.

== Resident diplomatic missions ==
- Chile has an embassy in Helsinki.
- Finland has an embassy in Santiago.
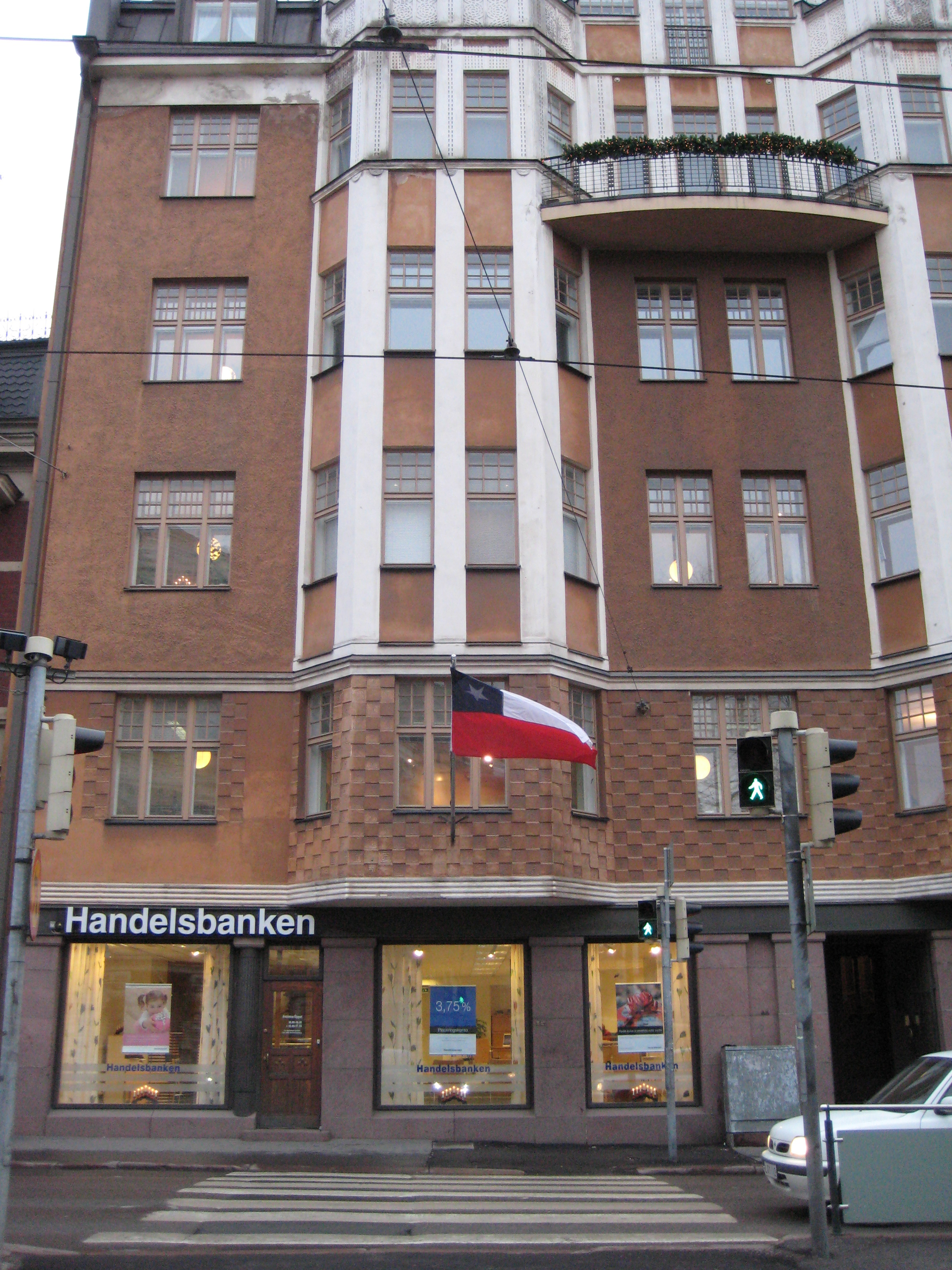
Embassy of Chile in Helsinki

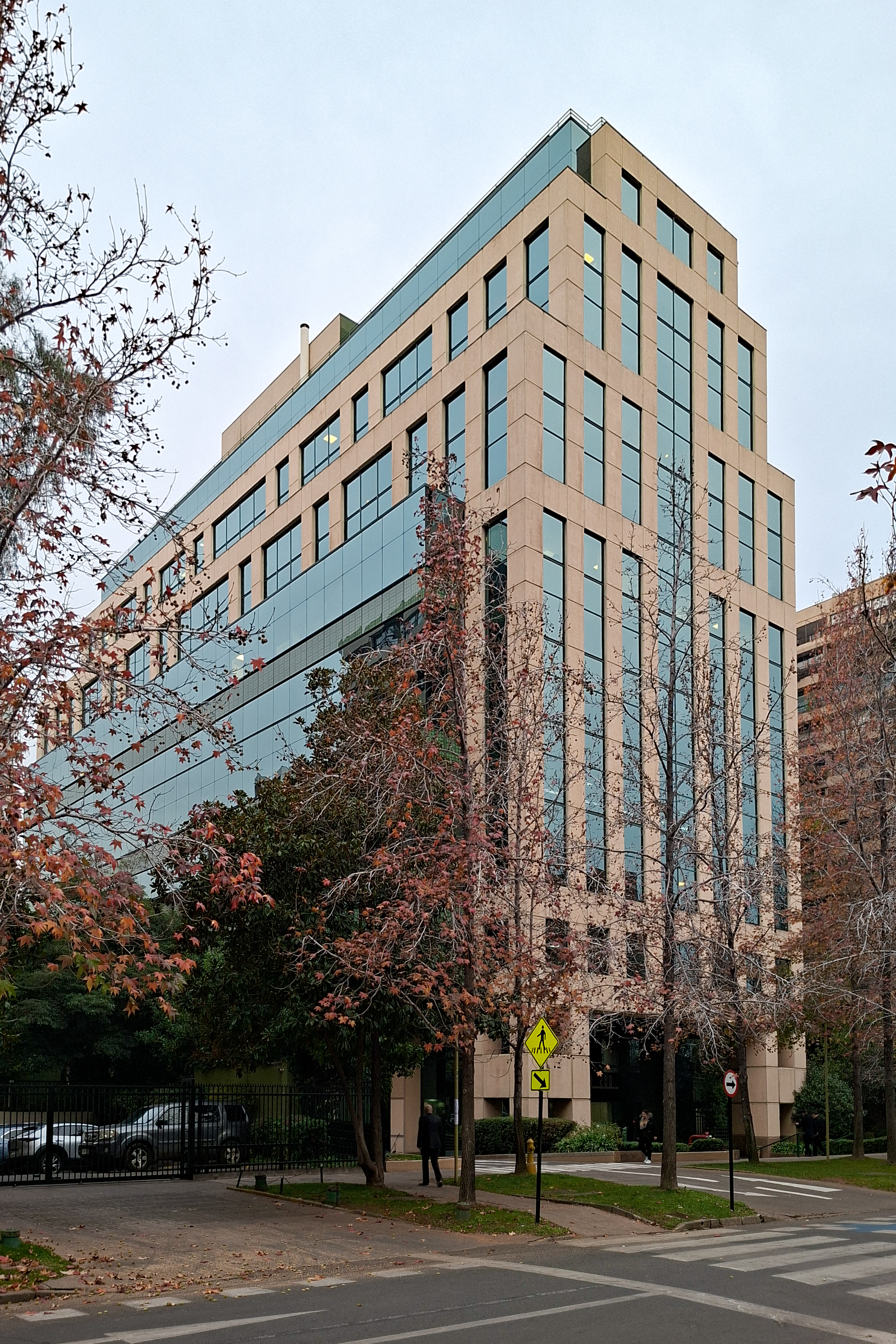
Building hosting the Embassy of Finland in Santiago

== See also ==
- Foreign relations of Chile
- Foreign relations of Finland
- Chileans in Finland

== Literature ==
- Pakkasvirta, Jussi; Aronen, Jukka, eds. (1998). Kahvi, pahvi ja tango – Suomen ja Latinanaisen Amerikan suhteet. Gaudeamus. ISBN 951-662-740-4.
