= Neles =

Finnish brand and defunct company

Neles Oyj
- Company type: Julkinen osakeyhtiö
- Industry: Process industries
- Predecessor: Metso
- Founded: 1 July 2020
- Defunct: 1 April 2022
- Fate: Acquired by Valmet
- Headquarters: Vantaa, Finland
- Key people: Jaakko Eskola (Chairman); Simo Sääskilahti (Interim President and CEO)
- Products: Valves
- Number of employees: 2,850 (2020)
- Website: www.neles.com

Neles Oyj was a Finnish publicly traded company offering flow control products and services for process industries. The Neles trademark was originally filed in 1956 by Finnish engineers Antti Nelimarkka and Eino Santasalo. In July 2019, it was announced that Metso Minerals and Outotec would merge in 2020 into a new large mineral company called Metso Outotec. At the same time, the remaining Metso was transformed into Neles. The company started operations on 1 July 2020.

Valmet acquired 14.9 percent of Neles' shares on 1 July 2020. On 13 July 2020, the Swedish company Alfa Laval made a two billion dollar takeover bid for Neles. Valmet announced that it will not support Alfa Laval's takeover bid in July 2020 and increased its holdings in Neles in August 2020.

Alfa Laval launched a public cash tender offer for all Neles shares on 13 August 2020. Valmet and Neles announced on 2 July 2021 that the Boards of Directors of Valmet and Neles have agreed to combine. The Finnish Financial Supervisory Authority approved the merger on 2 September 2021. Alfa Laval completed the sale of all its remaining shares in Neles on 14 January 2022.

In July 2021, the merger of Neles with Valmet was announced, and this took place on 1 April 2022. Neles is now a trademark for industrial valves and valve automation in process industries, and part of Valmet.
