= Kone- ja Siltarakennus =

Finnish engineering company

Kone- ja Siltarakennus Oy Maskin- och Brobyggnads Ab

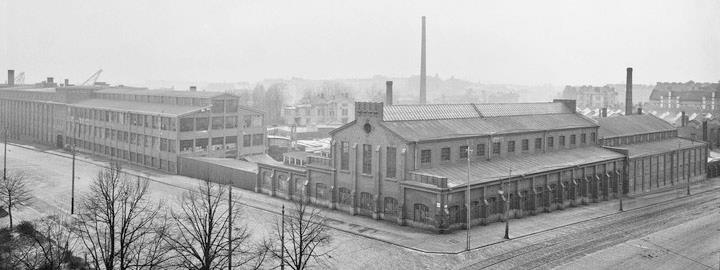
- Trade name: Finnish: Kone ja Silta; Swedish: Maskin o. Bro
- Company type: osakeyhtiö
- Industry: Engineering
- Predecessor: Osbergs Mekaniska Verkstad; Brobyggnads Ab
- Founded: 18 March 1892 in Helsinki, Finland
- Defunct: 18 July 1938
- Fate: acquired by Wärtsilä
- Successors: Valmet; Metso; ASSA Abloy
- Headquarters: Sörnäinen, Helsinki, Finland
- Brands: Separators: Milka; Lacta; Locks: Abloy
- Owners: Robert Mattson (50.4%, 1935)
- Parent: Wärtsilä (1935 →)
- Divisions: General division Separator division
- Subsidiaries: Crichton-Vulcan; Sandvikens Skeppsdocka och Mekaniska Verkstad; Kotka Mekaniska Verkstad

Kone- ja Siltarakennus Oy ("Kone ja Silta"; Swedish: Maskin- och Brobyggnads Ab; "Maskin o. Bro") is a Finnish former engineering company based in Sörnäinen, Helsinki.

The 1892 founded company grew heavily in the 1920s and 1930s by acquiring Finnish engineering companies; the products were ships, steel bridges, weighing scales, separators and other machinery. The company's separators were produced under brands Lacta and Milka and they were also produced in Sweden, Denmark and France. By the early 1930s Kone ja Silta held virtually the whole Finnish shipbuilding industry.

Majority of the company ownership was acquired by Wärtsilä iron works in 1935 and Kone- ja Siltarakennus was incorporated into Wärtsilä Group in 1938. The acquisition was prominent due to the significant size difference of the companies, and a major step in Wärtsilä's development as one of the leading engineering companies of Finland.

Production was transferred from Sörnäinen to Joensuu and Järvenpää in the late 1960s and early 1970s. The old factory area is nowadays part of Merihaka.

== Name ==
The company name was originally written officially in Swedish Maskin- och Brobyggnads Aktiebolaget, "Machine and Bridge Construction Limited" and widely shortened Maskin o. Bro, "Machine and Bridge". The Finnish name Kone- ja Siltarakennus, shortened Kone ja Silta respectively, was used in Finnish speaking context. The company name was changed officially into Finnish in 1935, but the Swedish speaking name was used in parallel after that.

== Origins ==
Brobyggnads Aktiebolaget, a Helsinki-based engineering company founded in 1889, got a significant order of railway bridges from the Finnish Grand Duchy in 1891. The order consisted few bridges for the northernmost part of the Karelian railway and all the bridges for the Pori railway. In order to be able to complete the order the company bought in spring 1892 Osbergs Mekaniska Verkstad, which was an 1853 founded engineering works, that had produced freight coaches and military supplies, such as ammunition transport caskets and coaches for various purposes. Osbergs Mekaniska Verkstad operated in Sörnäinen on a 3,5-hectare lot which it had leased from the city. The area was only partly built. After the acquisition, the company was renamed Maskin- och Brobyggnads Aktiebolaget.

== Grand Duchy era ==
Subsequently, the production was concentrated in Sörnäinen. By the beginning of the 20th century the main products were bridges and ships; shipbuilding was started already in 1891. The company built a dock on sea shore in Sörnäinen. The first vessel, a tug steamer, was handed over in 1893. Steam boilers became an important part of the product portfolio. Kone ja Silta got a notable orders for ammunition and railway cargo cars from the Finnish Grand Duchy; also the Imperial Russian Military Administration became a notable customer. At the end of the 1890s the company got an order of cargo cars from the State Railways. The good order base increased the income but the company had continuously problems with shortage of cash reserves. The old Brobyggnad premises next Köydenpunojankatu were sold and the company bought the land in Sörnäinen from the city. The share capital was increased in 1899, although it didn't succeed in full extent due to tightened money market regulations.

The Empire wanted to limit the economical independence of the Grand Duchy, and in 1902 it was announced that Finland was to be regarded as foreign country in determining toll fees. Moreover, the Russian public institutions were forbidden to order supplies from foreign countries. This created big problems to Finnish engineering companies, including Kone ja Silta, as they were very dependent on Russian market. Russian customers had typically given prepayments which had helped at maintaining cash reserves. The Imperial Russian Council of Ministers cancelled the order at the end of 1902 after deciding to seek for softer way to tie Finland into Russia. Subsequently, Kone ja Silta got a 4-million-mark order for 200 000 shrapnels.

Kone ja Silta made its best result until then been during the Russo-Japanese War in 1904–1905. The situation changed in 1907, when the Council of Ministers again re-introduced prohibition of governmental orders from engineering companies of the Finnish Grand Duchy.

The company management was aware that a such order would come and had investigated different business opportunities. The owners considered foundation of a namely Russian ammunition factory in Saint Petersburg or finding a Russian buyer for the company; neither of the options gained response. New markets for shrapnels were investigated in Romania and Italy, and Kone ja Silta went into contact with the Swedish AB Diesels Motorer investigating possibility to start diesel engine production. These efforts did not lead to results.

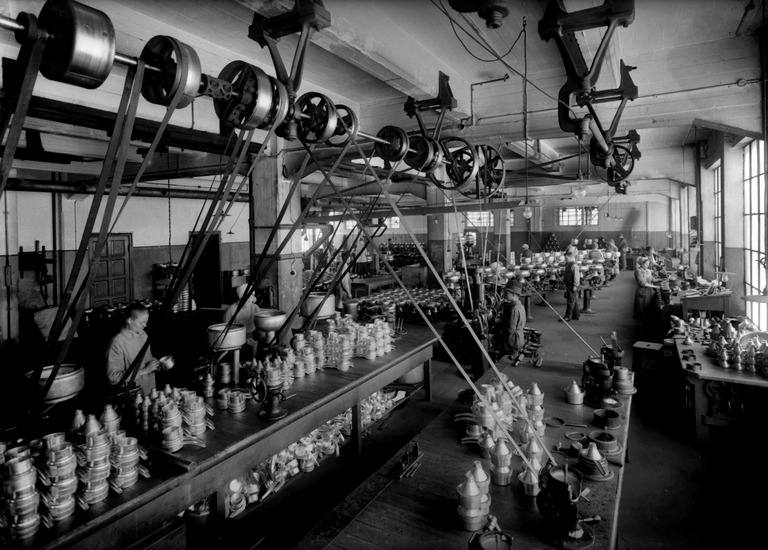
Separator assembly and testing in Kone ja Silta.

The management investigated possibility for separator production analysing number of types in the market. It was decided to develop a separator based on a Swedish invention. Kone ja Silta bought production machinery from a Copenhagen-based company that had ended separator production; also one person was recruited from the Danish company to work as financial manager of the newly founded Kone ja Silta separator department. However, the product construction was not successful and it was replaced by new type branded Lacta. The design was patented and exports started soon after. Another separator brand used was Milka.

Another successful new product was pulp and groundwood machinery, for which the company bought know-how from abroad.

New lines of production along with railway bridge projects in Lapland and Karelia as well as railway cargo car orders guaranteed the vital order basis. Moreover, Russian government started to slip from the boycott, and Kone ja Silta got few orders from the Russian government, and it produced also steamships, which operated in Russian rivers. In 1913 the company built new premises which suit better for the production portfolio. Only one year after the capacity was fully used due to outbreak of the First World War. Kone ja Silta produced ammunition and other military supplies and repaired Imperial Russian Navy ships. In the meantime, the demand of separators and other non-military supplies decreased. Although the military paid good prices for the products, getting raw material from Central Europe became impossible. The headcount was 700 before the war and it reached 3 000 in 1916. The value of Russian ruble decreased in relation to Finnish mark; in 1917 the company suffered loss of 2 million marks due to inflation of the ruble.

A new separator factory, designed by architects Armas Lindgren and Bertel Liljequist, was built on nearby Haapaniemenkatu in 1916.

The October Revolution in 1917 put an end to the military supply orders, and at the end of the year the company employed just barely 800 people any more.

While fall of the Russian market was a major loss, the company got locomotive, train car and bridge renovation orders from the newly independent state of Finland.

Kone ja Silta got orders for steam ships Carelia, Finlandia and Ostrobotnia from shipowner company Atlantic. But Atlantic fell into trouble with payments and eventually Kone ja Silta became a major shareholder of the shipping company. The company decided to run down its shipbuilding operations because the 1920s were difficult time for marine industry.

== Growth ==
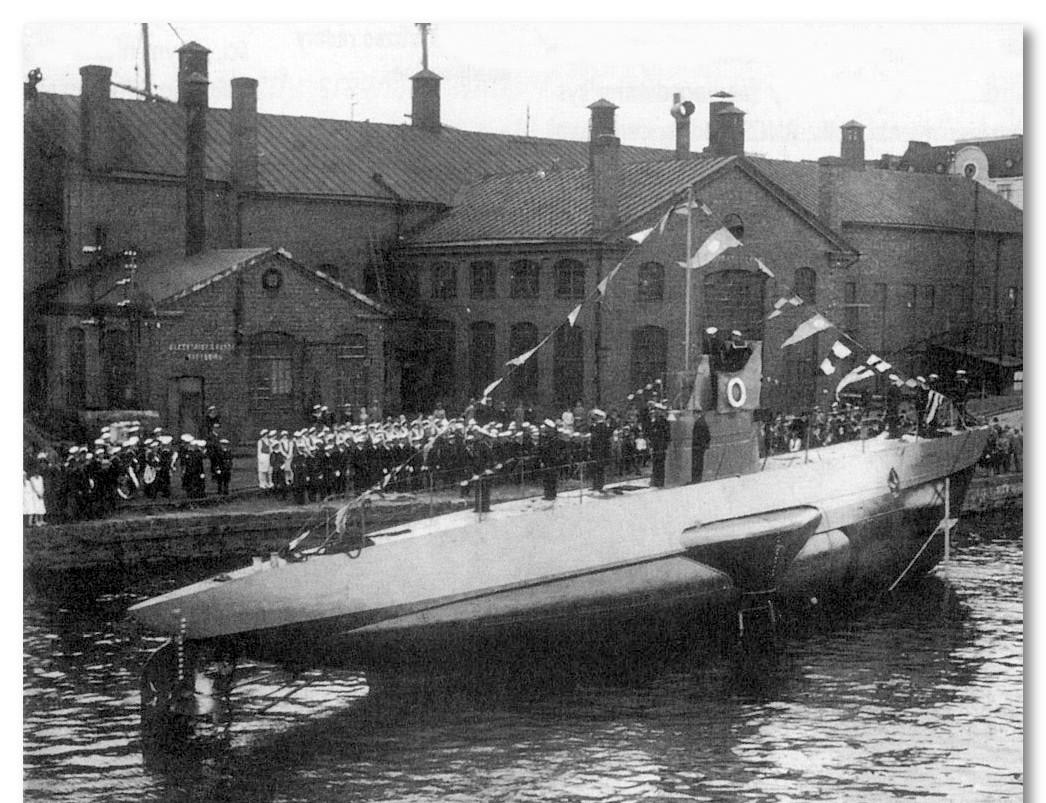
Launch of submarine Saukko at Hietalahti shipyard in 1930.

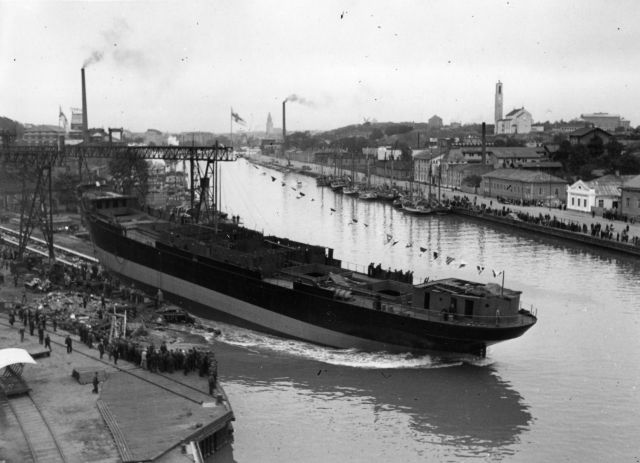
SS Rigel I being launched at Crichton-Vulcan shipyard in 1936.

In 1923 company Abloy, which had developed an innovative locking system, outsourced its production and marketing to Kone ja Silta. The patent was soon expired and the Abloy company was discontinued. Kone ja Silta held the rights for the brand and design and continued production of Abloy locks.

The company grew heavily by acquisitions in the 1920s. In 1926 Kone ja Silta had a long order backlog of pulp machinery, which caused concerns about lack of production capacity. Therefore, Kone ja Silta bought Sandvikens Skeppsdocka och Mekaniska Verkstad ("Hietalahti Shipyard and Engineering Works") for 8.6 million marks in December 1926. With the acquisition Kone ja Silta got a modern workshop with a large capacity. The main line of business was repairing and building of ships, but due to low demand, the Hietalahti yard produced just 15 new vessels in 1918–1931.

During 1928–1929 the Kone ja Silta production value exceeded 90 million marks, which was the highest figure since 1916. It droppen by ten million in the following accounting period and number of employees was reduced from 1,300 by nearly half. During the late 1920s the company delivered annual profit of three million marks, in 1930 the profit was just 0.8 million.

At the end of 1928 Kone ja Silta got offered majority of share capital of Turku-based shipbuilder Crichton-Vulcan. The yard had a good order base with significant assignments by the Finnish Navy, but it suffered of lack of capital. Kone ja Silta accepted the offer, and by end of 1931 it had already 98% ownership of the shipbuilder.

In autumn 1932 Kone ja Silta bought Kotka Mekaniska Verkstad ("Kotka Engineering Works"), which owned a shipyard and engineering workshop with wide-ranging product portfolio. In addition to this, the company held number of wood processing related patents.

Since the beginning of the 1932 Kone ja Silta operated as a group, which owned the independent shipbuilding companies in Turku and Helsinki, and the production of the parent company was subdivided to general and separator departments. The company separator division had production in Sweden, France and Denmark.

== Great Depression ==
During the Great Depression in the early 1930s the sales of separators dropped. This together with the recent large acquisitions started to cause financial problems to Kone ja Silta. The company main owner Robert Mattson blamed manager Robert Lavonius about neglectful management of the separator division, in particular in the Swedish subsidiary. According to Mattson, Lavonius had transferred losses to the Swedish branch by too high invoice values. Mattson also wanted to set another engineer, his son-in-law Carl V. Östman, to assist the separator department manager Heikki H. Herlin. Lavonius saw this unnecessary, because the problems did not originate from production but from sales. After Lavonius fired the Swedish branch Aktiebolaget Lacta Separator manager, who was also Mattson's son-in-law, there emerged a permanent conflict between the management and main owner. As the parties could not agree the conflict, the main funding bank Pohjoismaiden Yhdyspankki (PYP) named an external consultant to monitor the separator division management practices.

In early 1932 Kone ja Silta got a 34-million-mark ship order from Soviet Union. The order included a tanker ship, 12 tugboats and 23 motor cutters. The vessels were produced at the company's shipyards in Turku and Helsinki. The order was vital during the depression and a significant opening to the Soviet market, which led to another order in 1934.

In addition, the yards built two coastal defence ships and one submarine for the Finnish Navy.

The Finnish railway network development led to some bridge orders. Kone ja Silta invested on enamel production and started producing weighing scales under brand Toledo.

== Takeover by Wärtsilä ==
Julius Osberg had owned 27% of the share capital in 1899. The company had become stock listed in 1915 and later the main owner with 50.4% share became Åland-born shipowner Robert Mattson, who had created significant property during the First World War, but run into debt in the 1920s. His creditor PYP considered him unstable debtor and kept his over 20 000 Kone ja Silta shares in its vault. After Mattson's death in May 1935, the bank wanted to liquidate the property. PYP calculated being able to recover its losses, if it could sell the shares for unit price of 1 600 – 1 700 marks. Robert Lavonius considered 1 300 marks as a realistic price, because the share value in stock exchange was 1 100 marks. The bank reduced the price to 1 500 marks in the same autumn. According to rumours, Jacob Wallenberg from the Swedish Stockholms Enskilda Bank reached over Kone ja Silta; whether this was true or not remains uncertain, but it certainly mobilised the patriotically oriented Finnish industrialists.

Wilhelm Wahlforss, manager of Karelian Wärtsilä ironworks, visited Lavonius on 17 October suggesting an arrangement in which Kone ja Silta would have sold its share of Crichton-Vulcan to Wärtsilä for its nominal value; after this Crichton-Vulcan would have funded the pledged shares of Mattson by a loan that was to be guaranteed by Wärtsilä. The companies had a significant size difference: the Karelian ironworks had share capital of 30 million marks and 60 million marks' turnover, whereas the multi-industrial engineering company's share capital was 50 million and annual sales of nearly 250 million marks. Lavonius rejected Wahlforss's offer. The board of Wärtsilä met on 23 October and left on the following day an offer of 1 560 marks unit price for Mattson's shares.

Lavonius started urgently to collect a consortium for a competitive offer, but he could not reach the most needed board members Curt Mattson and Jacob von Julin. He tried to convince the bank representative of the board, Rainer von Fieandt, that it would be better if the ownership of Kone ja Silta was decentralised, and suggested that the subsidiaries and the consortium would share the costs of the shares. Lavonius tried intensively to collect the consortium but his efforts were wasted – the bank and Mattson's estate representatives agreed selling the shares to Wärtsilä. The acquisition was sealed first in Wärtsilä general meeting 8 November and signed on 15 November. The owners of Wärtsilä trusted Wahlforss, and the transaction was funded by increasing the company capital. The share capital was increased from 30 million to 72 million marks within one year.

The acquisition has some dubious characters. Wahlforss had deliberately invited representatives of Mattson's estate for a long meeting in a locked hotel cabinet in order to prevent Lavonius to reach them. Moreover, Kone ja Silta board member Rainer von Fieandt was also member of board in PYP, as well as in Wärtsilä.

The acquisition was significant in the contemporary scale of the Finnish engineering industry. Many were relieved, because Kone ja Silta had ended in Finnish ownership, but there were also skeptic views. Many doubted, how could an east Finnish ironmill, which had just recently recovered from a serious funding crisis, manage a large engineering company that possessed virtually the entire shipbuilding industry of Finland.

Wahlforss appointed himself chairman of the board in Kone ja Silta in December 1935. During the following months he changed the company articles radically, fired Lavonius and replaced him by Yrjö Vesa. The company was delisted in November 1936 and fully incorporated into Wärtsilä in July 1938.

== As a Wärtsilä subdivision ==
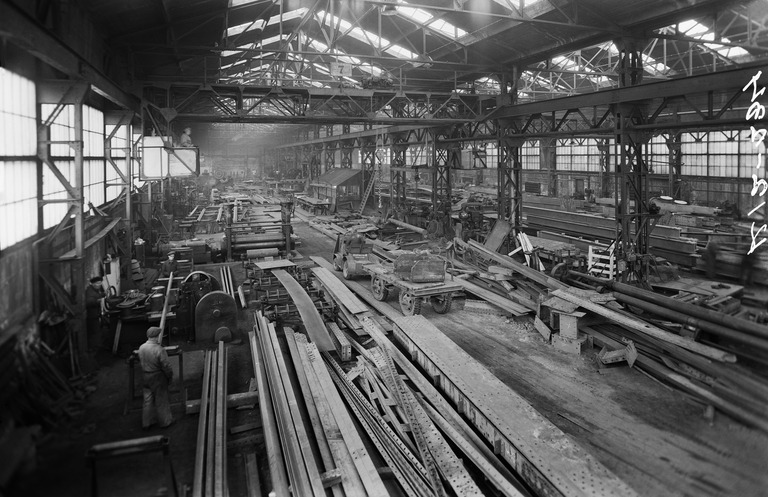
Wärtsilä Kone ja Silta bridge construction workshop in 1949.

Subsequently, Wärtsilä was reorganised and named Wärtsilä Group. The company head office was moved from Värtsilä to the Kone ja Silta premises in Sörnäinen. The Wärtsilä Iron Works formed one subdivision in the Group and the former Kone ja Silta was split into subdivisions Wärtsilä Kone ja Silta, Wärtsilä Kotkan Konepaja and Wärtsilä Hietalahden Telakka; additionally, Wärtsilä owned then 99.52% of Crichton-Vulcan and entirely Kareliawood, 1936 acquired Wärtsilä Vaasassa and 1937 acquired Wärtsilä Pietarsaaressa. Still in 1938 Wärtsilä bought Dalsbruk steel foundry, becoming the largest company of Finland in number of personnel.

In the 1960s the Kone ja Silta works in Sörnäinen had a versatile portfolio, including structures for nuclear power plants, steel bridges, pulp machinery, paper machines and printing machines. Decision of moving to larger premises was made already in the 1960s, and the production was eventually moved to a new engineering works opened in Järvenpää in 1970. The new factory focused on paper machine production. Production of Abloy locks was moved to a new factory in Joensuu already in 1968.

== Successors ==
The Järvenpää factory was sold to Valmet in 1986 as a part of arrangement in which Valmet shipyards were moved under Wärtsilä Marine. Later it became a part of Metso paper machine industry.

The Abloy factory in Joensuu belongs nowadays to Swedish ASSA Abloy group.

Large part of the Kone ja Silta complex in Sörnäinen was demolished in 1972, giving way to Merihaka buildings. The old separator factory served for a while the 1988 founded Finnish Competition Authority (FCA).

== Sources ==
- Haavikko, Paavo (1984). Wärtsilä 1834–1984 (in Finnish). Oy Wärtsilä Ab. ISBN 951-99542-0-1.
- Mononen, Veijo (2000). "Wärtsilä Oy:n sekä Kone ja Silta Oy:n fuusio suomalaisen metalliteollisuuden rakennejärjestelyn osana 1930-luvulla" [Merger of Wärtsilä Oy and Kone ja Silta Oy as a part of metal industry restructuring in Finland in the 1930s] (pdf). Jyväskylä University Digital Archive (Graduation thesis) (in Finnish). Jyväskylä.
- Zilliacus, Benedict (1984). Wilhelm Wahlforss (in Finnish). Translated from Swedish by Riitta Valajärvi. Porvoo: Oy Wärtsilä Ab. ISBN 951-99541-8-X.
