= Yrjö Vesa =

vuorineuvos Yrjö Waldemar Vesa
- Born: 12 April 1898; Helsinki, Grand Duchy of Finland
- Died: 4 December 1967 (aged 69)
- Education: Finnish University of Technology
- Board member of: Osuuskunta Kompensation (1940→); Siemens Sähkö Oy; Oy SKF Ab; Suomalaisen työn liitto (1936–1961); Finnish Association for Industrial Property Rights (1936→); Finnish Engineering Industry Employers' Association (1937–1947); Finnish Employers' Central Association (STK; 1941–1947; 1953–1954); Management Institute of Industry (1946–1947)
- Spouse: Liisa née Paloheimo
- Parent(s): Matti Viktor Vesa and Maria Theresia née Gustafsson
- Awards: vuorineuvos (1947); Cross of Liberty, 1st Class; Cross of Liberty, 2nd Class; Cross of Liberty, 3rd Class; Commander of the White Rose of Finland; Memorial Medal for War of Freedom; Memorial Medal for Winter War; Memorial Medal for Continuation War

Manager of Kone- ja Siltarakennus
- In office 1937–1942
- Preceded by: Robert Lavonius

Manager of Valmet
- In office 1947–1954
- Succeeded by: Gustaf Wrede

Yrjö Waldemar Vesa (12 April 1898 – 4 December 1967) was a Finnish engineer, businessman and vuorineuvos.

Vesa was born and he did his studies in Helsinki. Following his graduation as Mechanical Engineer in 1921 he worked in Germany and United States in engineering and automotive companies. He returned in Finland in 1927 working for the following five years for Tampereen Pellava- ja Rauta-Teollisuus Oy in Tampere.

Yrjö Vesa started his career in Helsinki-based engineering company Kone ja Silta in 1932. The company was taken over by Wärtsilä and by time Vesa became manager of Kone ja Silta, and subsequently he was Deputy Director of Wärtsilä until 1947.

During the 1930s and 1940s Vesa was board member and later chairman of the Finnish Employers' Central Association (STK). His most difficult time as negotiator was after the World War II, when communists organised several strikes and reached for weight in companies.

Yrjö Vesa became the first manager of state-owned Valmet. He was involved at starting tractor and paper machine production, which later grew flourishing businesses. The company's shipyards created problems, and when the board wanted to produce ships unprofitably due to employment reasons, Vesa was against it, and was subsequently fired. For the rest of his career he managed an insurance company.

== Early years and studies ==
Vesa's parents were Matti Viktor Vesa and Maria Theresia née Gustafsson. He studied in Helsinki Finnish Normal Lyceum and did his matriculation exam in 1917. Vesa continued his studies in Finnish University of Technology and graduated MSc in Mechanical Engineering in 1921.

== Career ==
=== Early career ===
Already during his studies, in 1919–1920, Vesa had worked as manager of Motor Battalion workshop; he worked as depot manager in 1921–1922. At the same time he worked in patent office under Ministry of Trade and Industry. In 1922 Vesa moved to Germany where he worked as workshop engineer for Siemens-Schuckert-Werke GmbH and Protos Automobile GmbH in 1922–1924. In 1925 Vesa moved to the United States where he first worked as mechanic at H. Drexler in New York City, then he became draftsman at American Machine & Foundry Co. in Brooklyn. Still in the same year he changed to Westinghouse Electric Co. where he worked as draftsman until 1926. During 1926–1927 he was employed by Columbus Die & Tool Co. in Columbus, Ohio as special tool designer. Vesa returned in Finland in 1927. During 1927–1932 Vesa worked as workshop engineer for Tampereen Pellava- ja Rauta-Teollisuus Oy in Tampere.

=== Kone- ja Siltarakennus and Wärtsilä ===
In 1932 Vesa changed to Kone- ja Siltarakennus (Kone ja Silta), a Helsinki-based engineering company. He started as manager of separator workshop. Vesa was appointed Technical Manager in 1934. In 1935 the company was taken over by Wärtsilä. The Wärtsilä manager Wilhelm Wahlforss trusted Vesa who had a similar vivid temper and style of making decisions quickly. Wahlforss first made him Deputy Director and in the end of 1936 Vesa was appointed Manager of Kone ja Silta. In spring 1939 Vesa participated in Wärtsilä trade negotiations with Soviet Union. The negotiations were successful, the company was to get orders for steamships, pulp boilers and steam boilers, but the Winter War, that bursted out in the same year, cancelled the agreement.

In 1942, during the Continuation War, Wahlforss appointed Vesa Deputy Manager of Wärtsilä Group. Running up and managing military supply production kept Vesa busy. After the war ended to Moscow Armistice, Vesa negotiated about war reparations as representative of the Finnish war reparation industry.

=== Employers' organisation ===
During 1937–1941 Vesa had been deputy chairman in Finnish Engineering Industry Employers' Association and Deputy Board member of the Finnish Employers' Central Association (STK). Wahlforss had been member of board of STK since 1931 and Deputy chairman in 1937–1942. Despite requests, he did not want to become chairman. In 1941 Vesa became actual board member of STK and in 1942 he was selected as a chairman. The association manager, Antti Hackzell, was a close friend of Wahlforss and Wärtsilä board member. The strong presence of engineering industry, and Wärtsilä in particular, caused concern amongst the STK forest industry representatives, who accused the engineering industry about coup d'état.

In January 1940 STK and the trade union Finnish Federation of Trade Unions (SAK) officially recognised each other as representative, negotiating parties. Since then, the employers' side had been expecting initiatives from the union. In spring 1943 SAK proposed a general agreement. The negotiations began with meetings between chairmen of both parties. At the beginning of the process Vesa tried to exclude collective agreement from the package, but eventually failed; the pressure from the union side was high, and finally, in spring 1944, Vesa had to sign the general agreement, which included a collective agreement.

After the war against Soviet Union ended in September 1944, labour disputed bursted out as number of legal and illegal strikes. This created challenges to the war reparations industry which had to follow the strict schedule set in the armistice. Moreover, the strikes often included volatile demonstrations, which were feared to escalate riots leading communists rising to power.

A critical occasion took place in Turku in spring 1945 when workers of Crichton-Vulcan shipyard started overtime ban. According to the armistice, the yard capacity was prioritised to Soviet Navy vessels which were needed in the Soviet East Pomeranian Offensive. Many of the Soviet vessels brought to the yard, mostly submarines, were severely damaged. The yard workers were tired because of the intense workload and required a such increase to their salaries that it would assure livelihood by normal working hours. The Soviet military leadership had no understanding towards Finnish labour disputes. Prime minister Paasikivi was afraid that Soviet Union would even occupy Finland if the dispute would not be resolved; he called Vesa into his office and told him that the union action must be ended at any cost. Vesa went directly to meet the communist Minister of the Interior, Yrjö Leino, who had been his classmate in the Normal Lyceum. Leino made him a document that included an order to end the action. After Vesa showed the paper in Turku the overtime ban was withdrawn in March 1945.

Communist minister Yrjö Murto suggested creating production committees at workplaces. The employers saw it as an attempt to promote socialism. The employers started countermeasures under Vesa's lead, and finally the Production Committee Act introduced in 1946 defined the committees purely advisory.

The intense war reparation industry required professional leadership, which was not sufficiently available. Vesa initiated founding of industrial management institute in STK board meeting in 1945. STK collected the funding and the Management Institute of Industry was started already in the following year when it organised ten management courses. Vesa also criticised the contemporary Finnish school system in which the children were put to select the line of their studies at an early stage. He suggested creating a such school which would give basic education for the whole generation.

In 1947 Vesa was awarded vuorineuvos title due to his contribution as company and employers' association. He worked as STK chairman until 1947 when he started as manager in newly formed Valtion Metallitehtaat (State Metalworks) company and he was forced to give up his position in STK; this was due to demand of the political left wing, which at first did not accept membership of employers' association for managers of the state owned companies.

=== From State Metalworks to Valmet ===
When Yrjö Vesa started as manager of Valtion Metallitehtaat, it was a miscellaneous group of small companies which had been collected together in 1946. The companies had produced military supplies during the wartime after which they had focused on war reparations. Management and administration of a such arrangement turned out to be problematic, and therefore the state put them under one company, Valmet Oy, which was founded at the end of 1950.

Vesa was involved at starting tractor and paper machine production; these divisions grew later successful lines of business.

The Valmet shipyards caused a lot of problems. During the war they had operated as repairs yards and for the war reparations they had built such ships which other yards had refused to produce. After the war reparations were paid off the yards did not have enough of orders. The government pressed Valmet to produce ships to Soviet Union with unprofitable prices due to employment reasons. The company board decided that the Helsinki yard must get enough of orders from Soviet Union even if they would not be profitable, or cover all the costs. Vesa stood against such business and subsequently he was removed from office in 1954.

After Valmet, Vesa worked for over ten years as manager for Teollisuuden Auto- ja vastuuvakuutus (Vehicle and Liability Insurance Company of Industry) in 1954–1965.

== Bibliography ==
- Moottoripyörä ja sen hoito; "Motorcycle and its maintenance" (1924)
- Ajatuksia teollisuusdemokratiasta; "Thoughts about industrial democracy" (1945; in Swedish 1946)
