= Chileans in Finland =

People from Chile residing in Finland

Chilenos en Finlandia Chileläiset Suomessa
- (Chile) (Finland)
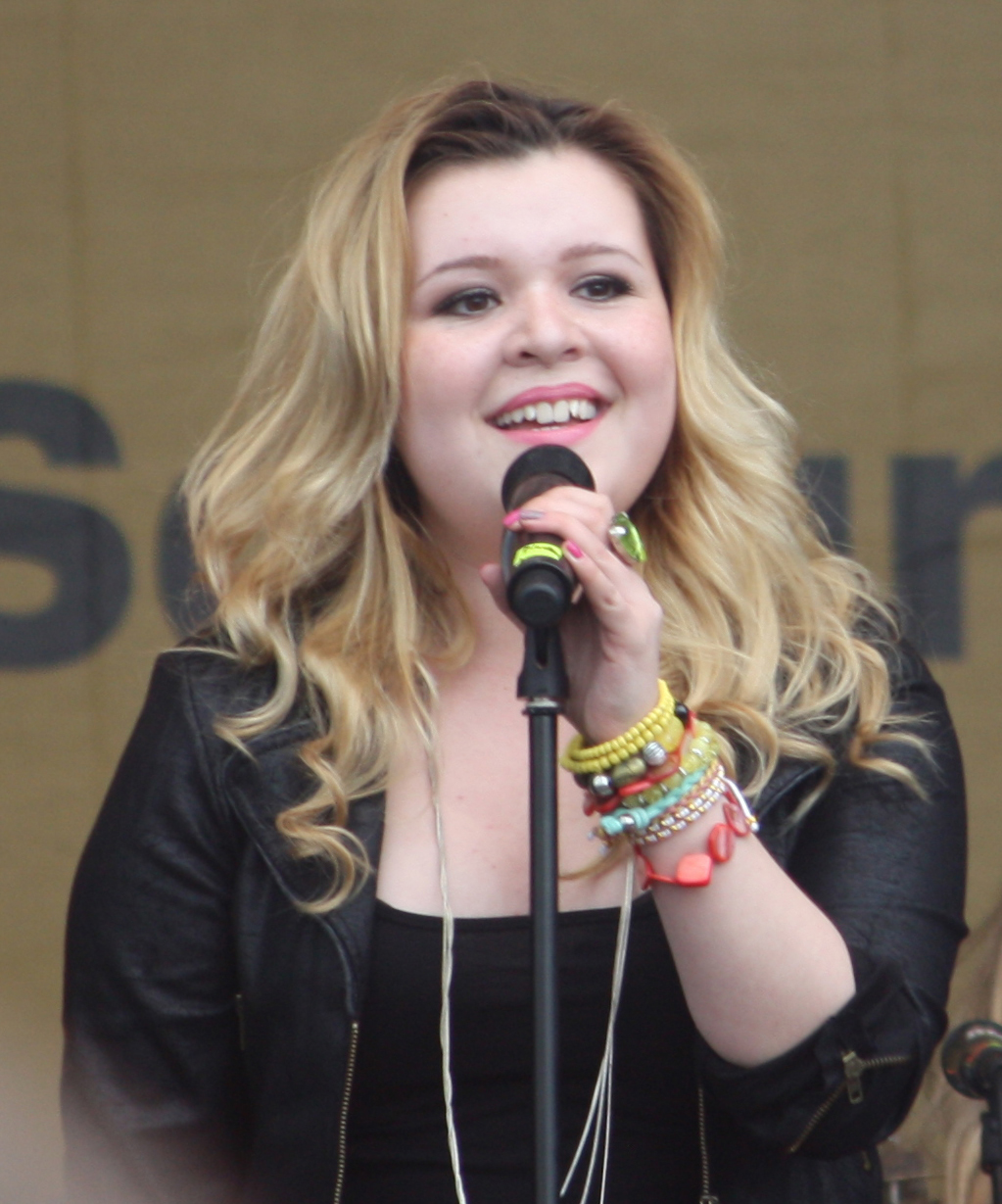
Diandra

Total population
- around 1,000

Regions with significant populations
- Helsinki

Languages
- Spanish · Finnish

Religion
- Christianity (predominantly Catholicism)

Related ethnic groups
- Chilean Swedes

Chileans in Finland are people from Chile residing in Finland.

== History ==
Following the 1973 Chilean coup d'état, approximately 300 Chilean refugees fled to Finland, most if not all of them helped by Tapani Brotherus. They were the first refugee group to be taken by the government. On November 18, 1973, it was reported that the first refugees were departing Santiago and headed to Helsinki. This was handled by Finnish Red Cross. The head manager Gunnar Rosén made sure that the refugees were taken care of until everyone had a job and an apartment. They were also promised necessary education. The first group arrived the next day on 19 November 1973. There were about 30 refugees, among them other Latin Americans.

The Finns welcomed Chileans. Many people in Finland felt sympathy towards them. For example, in 1974, there was a protest in Helsinki Senate Square against the Chilean coup d'état, where nearly 10,000 protested.

== Employment ==
39.1% of Chileans are employed, 13.8% are unemployed and 47.1% are outside the labour force. Most Chileans are employed as teachers, health care workers, natural science and engineering specialists and housekeepers.

== Organizations ==
- Suomi-Chile-Seura r.y

== Notable people ==
- Diandra, singer
- Matias Kivikko Arraño, footballer
- Marce Rendic, radio personality

== See also ==
- Chile–Finland relations
- Chilean diaspora
- Immigration to Finland
