= Metso =

Finnish industrial machinery company

Metso Corporation

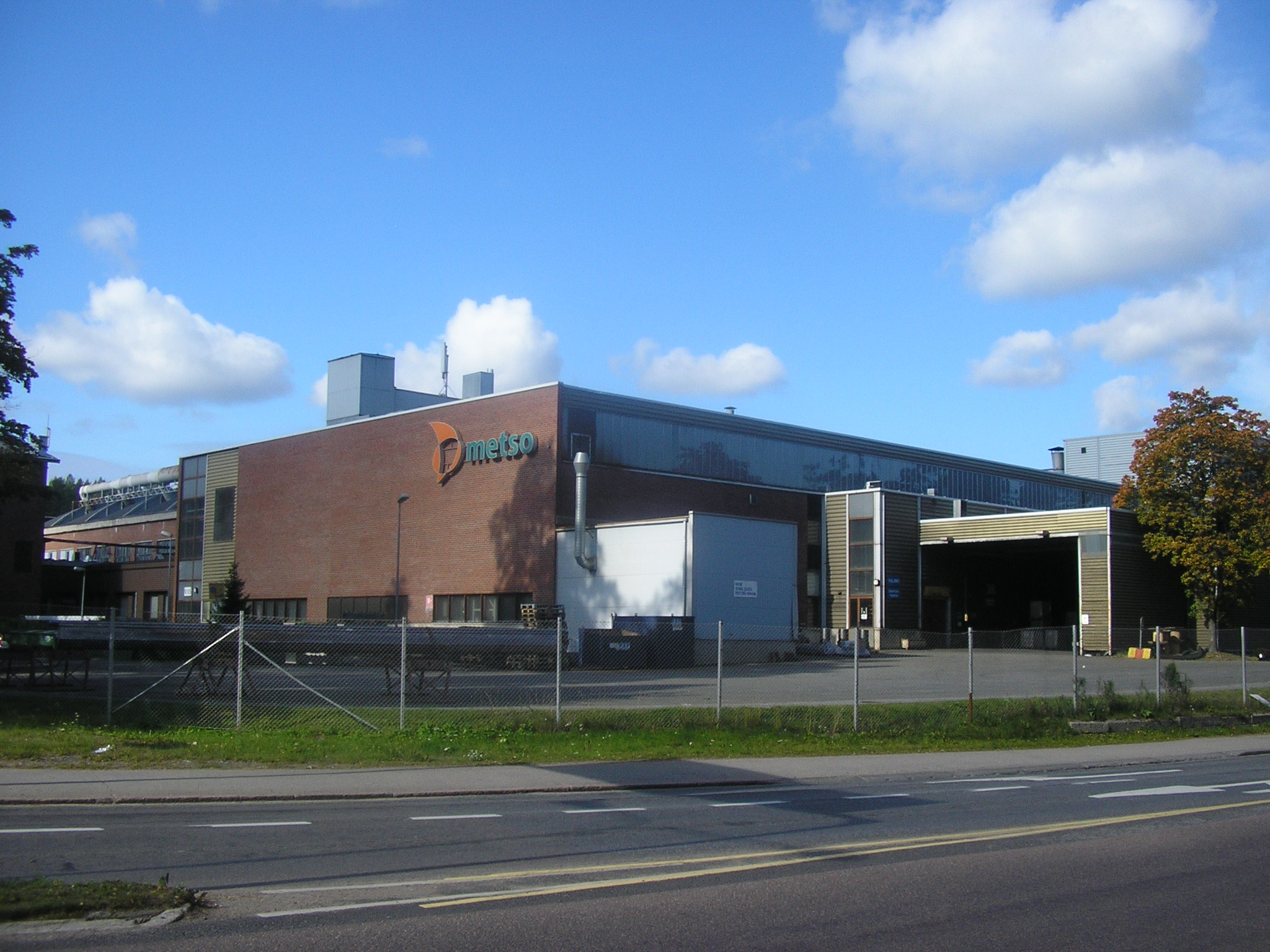
- Native name: Metso Oyj
- Type: Julkinen osakeyhtiö
- Traded as: Nasdaq Helsinki: METSO
- Industry: Industrial machinery
- Predecessor: Valmet, Rauma Oy
- Founded: 1999
- Defunct: 1 July 2020
- Headquarters: Helsinki, Finland
- Key people: Mikael Lilius (Chairman), Pekka Vauramo (President and CEO)
- Products: Industrial company serving the mining, construction, recycling, oil and gas, pulp, paper and process industries
- Revenue: ▲€3.6 billion (2019)
- Operating income: ▲€418 million (2019)
- Number of employees: 15,000 (end 2019)
- Website: www.metso.com

Metso Corporation (natively Metso Oyj) was a Finnish industrial machinery company focusing on providing technology and services for mining, and aggregates industries.

On 30 June 2020, Metso's partial demerger and combination of Metso Minerals business unit and Outotec took place. Two new companies started operations on 1 July 2020: Neles and Metso Outotec.

== History ==
Metso was created through the merger of Valmet and Rauma Oy in 1999. In 2013, Metso demerged into two separate companies: Metso Corporation and Valmet Corporation.

=== 2000s ===
By 2008, Metso had become Finland's ninth largest company and the number of Metso shareholders had increased from 25,000 to 42,000. Metso strengthened its market position and service capacity in growing markets, particularly in India and China. During 2008, the expansions to the Ahmedabad foundry and the Bawal factory in India were completed.

Metso also purchased the paper machine technology of Japanese Mitsubishi Heavy Industries’ (MHI), making Metso the sole owner of Beloit's paper machinery intellectual property globally.

In September 2008, Metso sold 83% of its foundry in Sweden to an investment group assembled by the Primaca investment company. The Metso Foundries Karlstad unit specialized in casts of wind power components, diesel engine blocks and Yankee cylinders for paper machines.

By 2009, half of Metso's orders received in 2009 came from emerging markets, compared to less than one fifth in 1999. In the same year, Metso entered into a combination agreement with Tamfelt, one of the world's leading suppliers of technical textile. Subsequently, Metso made a public exchange offer for all of Tamfelt's shares.

=== 2010s ===
In 2012, Metso agreed to form a joint venture with China's LiuGong Group to develop the track-mounted crushing business in China, consolidated its valve operations in the United States into new premises in Massachusetts and opened a new valve supply and service center in Vadodara, India. In the same year, Metso acquired the Korean valve manufacturer Valstone Control Inc., U.S. software company ExperTune Inc. and 75 percent of the Chinese crushing and screening equipment producer Shaorui Heavy Industries.

Metso Recycling business offers metal and waste recycling equipment and services globally. On 1 September 2011, Metso announced that the Recycling business would be managed as a separate entity while Metso reviews other strategic alternatives for it. As part of this process, Metso evaluated both external and internal options. On 25 October 2012, Metso announced that Metso Recycling will be integrated into Mining and Construction as of 1 December 2012.

In August 2013, Metso closed the acquisition of Chinese manganese steel foundry JX.

=== 2013 company demerge ===
On 1 October 2013, the Extraordinary General Meeting approved the demerger of Metso into two companies. At the start of 2014, Metso Corporation's Mining and Construction business and Automation business formed the new Metso Corporation and Metso's Pulp, Paper and Power business formed a new independent company under the name Valmet Corporation.

In December 2013 Metso reduced its holding in Valmet Automotive to approximately 41%. As a result of this arrangement, Valmet Automotive ceased to be a Metso subsidiary.

In 2015, Metso divested its Process Automation Systems (PAS) business to Valmet, focusing on their mining and aggregates industries operations and on the flow control systems manufacturing business.

=== 2020 partial demerger and combination of Metso Minerals and Outotec ===
All regulatory approvals were received by 18 June 2020 and partial demerger was registered on 30 June 2020. Metso Outotec and Neles started operations on 1 July 2020.

=== Acquisition of McCloskey International ===
In June 2019 Metso acquired the Northern Ireland based McCloskey International.

=== 2020s ===
In July 2023, it was announced Metso had acquired the Perth-headquartered bulk material handling company Brouwer Engineering.

== Organization ==
=== Corporate governance ===
Metso's President and CEO as well as Chairman of the Executive Team is Pekka Vauramo as of 1 November 2018.

==== Metso’s Board of Directors ====
Metso's Board includes the following members.

- Mikael Lilius (Chairman since 31 December 2013. Board member since 2013.)
- Christer Gardell (Vice Chairman since 31 December 2013. Board member since 2006.)
- Peter Carlsson (2016–)
- Lars Josefsson (2013–)
- Nina Kopola (2013–)
- Antti Mäkinen (2018–)
- Kari Stadigh
- Arja Talma (2016–)
- Raimo Brand

==== Metso Executive Team ====
The Executive Team includes the following members.

- Pekka Vauramo, President and CEO
- Eeva Sipilä, CFO and Deputy to CEO
- Stephan W Kirsch, President, Mining Equipment business area
- Markku Simula, President, Aggregates Equipment business area
- Olli Isotalo, President, Valves
- Sami Takaluoma, President, Minerals Consumables business area
- Uffe Hansen, President, Recycling business area
- Giuseppe Campanelli, President, Minerals Services business area
- Kalle Sipilä, President, Pumps business area
- Jani Puroranta, Chief Digital Officer

=== Minerals processing ===
==== Products and services ====
For minerals processing in the mining, aggregates and recycling industries, Metso's offering includes crushers, screens, mining solutions, grinding mills and media, conveyors, solutions for bulk materials handling as well as process, pyro processing and recycling equipment.

==== Competitors ====
Metso's biggest competitors in the mining industry include FLSmidth, Outotec and ThyssenKrupp, and in the construction industry Terex, Atlas Copco, Caterpillar and Sandvik.

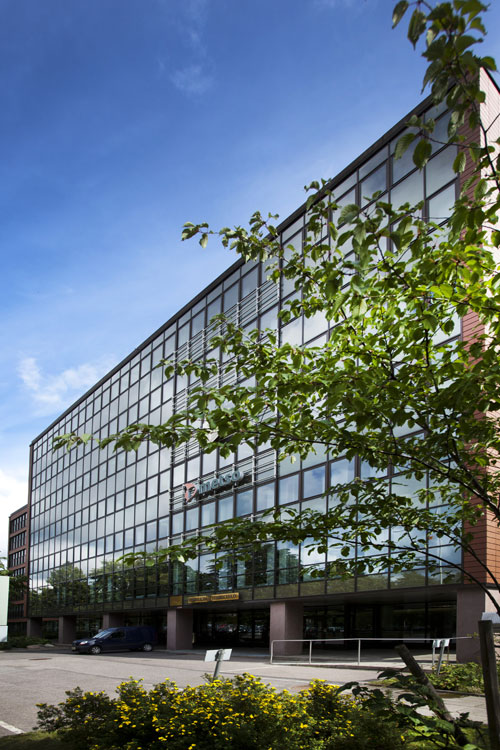
Metso premises in Hakkila, Vantaa, Finland.

=== Customers ===
Metso's customers operate in mining, aggregates, recycling and process industries.

== Share ==
Metso's share was listed on the Helsinki Stock Exchange. The share was previously traded also on the New York Stock Exchange, but the listing there ended on 14 September 2007 and now, in the US, it is exchanged on the over-the-counter (OTC) market.

Starting from 1 July, Metso's share is continued by Neles.

=== Shareholders ===
Metso's biggest registered shareholders on 30 September 2016 were:

- Solidium Oy (14.9%)
- Keskinäinen työeläkevakuutusyhtiö Varma(3.4%)
- Keskinäinen Eläkevakuutusyhtiö Ilmarinen (1.5%)
- Odin -rahastot (1.0%)
- Valtion Eläkerahasto (1.0%)
- Keva (1.0%)
- Mandatum Henkivakuutusosakeyhtiö (1.0%)
- Svenska litteratursällskapet i Finland r.f. (0.8%)
- Keskinäinen Työeläkevakuutusyhtiö Elo (0.6%)
- Schweizerische Nationalbank (0.5%)
