= Larox =

- Company type: Public (Nasdaq Helsinki: LARBS)
- Industry: Engineering and service
- Founded: 1977
- Headquarters: Lappeenranta, Finland
- Products: Industrial filters, slurry pumps & valves
- Number of employees: 562
- Parent: Metso
- Website: www.mogroup.com

Larox, founded in 1977 and headquartered at Lappeenranta, Finland, was a Finnish engineering company that developed, designed and manufactured industrial filters for use in mining and metallurgy, chemical processing and related industries.

Outotec launched a €93 million takeover bid for the company in October 2009 and holds over 98% of its shares as of 26 February 2010.

After Metso Outotec merger, completed in July 2020, Larox filtration technologies are currently part of Metso Outotec portfolio. In May 2023, Metso Outotec rebranded into Metso.
