= Marce (disambiguation) =

Marce is a singer/songwriter.

Marce may also refer to:

- Marcé, French commune
- Typhoon Marce, used for several storms in the Philippines
- Marce et Tumpak, Martinican pop band that uses elements of both traditional and modern music

== People ==
- Marce LaCouture, American folk music and cajun recording artist and songwriter
- Marce Rendic, Finnish radio personality
