= Julius Stjernvall =

Finnish engineer, businessman and vuorineuvos

vuorineuvos Julius Stjernvall
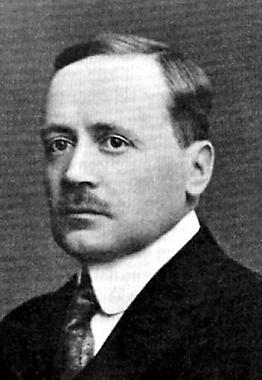
- Born: 26 October 1874; Mäntsälä, Grand Duchy of Finland
- Died: 6 May 1939 (aged 64); Helsinki, Finland
- Education: mechanical engineer (1900)
- Political party: SFP
- Board member of: Ab Wärtsilä Oy; HOP
- Parent(s): Carl Julius Stjernvall and Maria née Jakovlev
- Awards: vuorineuvos (1924); Cross of Liberty, 2nd Class
- Military career
- Allegiance: Russian Empire
- Branch: infantry
- Service years: 1896–1898
- Rank: ensign (promoted lieutenant in 1907)
- Unit: 132nd Bender Infantry Regiment

Diet of Finland 1904–1905 Estate of Nobility and Chivalry
- In office 8 December 1904 – 15 April 1905

Minister of Trade and Industry
- In office 27 November 1918 – 17 April 1919
- President: K. J. Ståhlberg
- Prime Minister: Lauri Ingman
- Preceded by: Heikki Renvall
- Succeeded by: Juho Vennola

Manager of Kone- ja Siltarakennus
- In office 1919–1929
- Preceded by: Carl Enckell
- Succeeded by: Robert Lavonius

Manager of Hietalahti Shipyard and Engineering Works
- In office 1928 – 1 April 1929
- Preceded by: K. Albin Johansson
- Succeeded by: Robert Lavonius

Julius Stjernvall (26 October 1874 – 6 May 1939) was a Finnish engineer, businessman and vuorineuvos.

Stjernvall worked as manager in Finnish branch of Siemens & Halske 1904–1914 and subsequently in Kone ja Silta until 1929; the company grew during his time through new products and acquisitions. He was Minister of Trade and Industry in the short-lived Lauri Ingman's cabinet in 1918–1919

== Early life and studies ==
Stjernvall's parents were colonel Carl Julius Stjernvall and Maria née Jakovlev. He graduated from Finnish Cadet School in Hamina in 1896. During his studies he served as ensign in 132nd Bender Infantry Regiment. He was later promoted lieutenant in 1907 when he was already in reserve. Stjernvall continued his studies in Polytechnic Institute in Helsinki and graduated in 1900 as Mechanical Engineer.

== Career ==
During 1904–1914, Stjernvall led technical office of Siemens & Halske in Helsinki; in this period the company built the first steam turbine power plant of Finland in Tampere and connected Sveaborg to electrical grid through an undersea cable. Stjernvall represented nobility and chivalry in Diet of Finland in 1904–1905. In 1914, shortly before the First World War Stjernvall moved to Kone- ja Siltarakennus (Kone ja Silta) as Deputy Director. Due to intense arms race between the European superpowers prior the war, the company had a good order backlog from the Russian military; Kone ja Silta produced munition and other military supplies, and repaired ships of the Imperial Russian Navy. Stjernvall became company manager in 1917. In the same year, Finland became independent. In 1918, Swedish People's Party of Finland asked him to join in Lauri Ingman's cabinet as Minister of Trade and Industry. Stjernvall agreed, but the cabinet turned out to be short-living, and already after few months, he was back.

Kone ja Silta grew strongly during Stjernvall's time. In 1923, the company started producing Abloy locks. Kone ja Silta took over Hietalahti Shipyard and Engineering Works on 22 December 1926. The articles of association were changed uniform with Kone ja Silta in December 1927, after which both companies shared the same management.

In 1928–1929, the company turnover reached 90 million marks and made 3 million marks' profit. At the time Kone ja Silta employed 1 300 people.

Stjernvall was entitled vuorineuvos in 1924.

Stjernvall handed over his managerial post of Hietalahti Shipyard and Engineering works to Robert Lavonius on 1 April 1929. At the end of the same year, he submitted his resignation to Kone ja Silta for health reasons.

After his resignation, Stjernvall continued in positions of trust in Helsingin Osakepankki (HOP). Between 1918 and 1939, Stjernvall was twice the chairman of the Board.

== Private life and tribute ==
Stjernvall had no family. A street was named after him, Stjernvallintie in Kulosaari, until it was renamed Vuorineuvoksentie in 1958.

== Sources ==
- Osakeyhtiö Hietalahden Sulkutelakka ja Konepaja – aikaisemmin Helsingfors Skeppsdocka [Hietalahti Shipyard and Engineering Works Limited – formerly Helsinki Shipyard] (in Finnish). Helsinki: Osakeyhtiö Hietalahden Sulkutelakka ja Konepaja. 1935.
