= OMX Helsinki 25 =

Stock market index

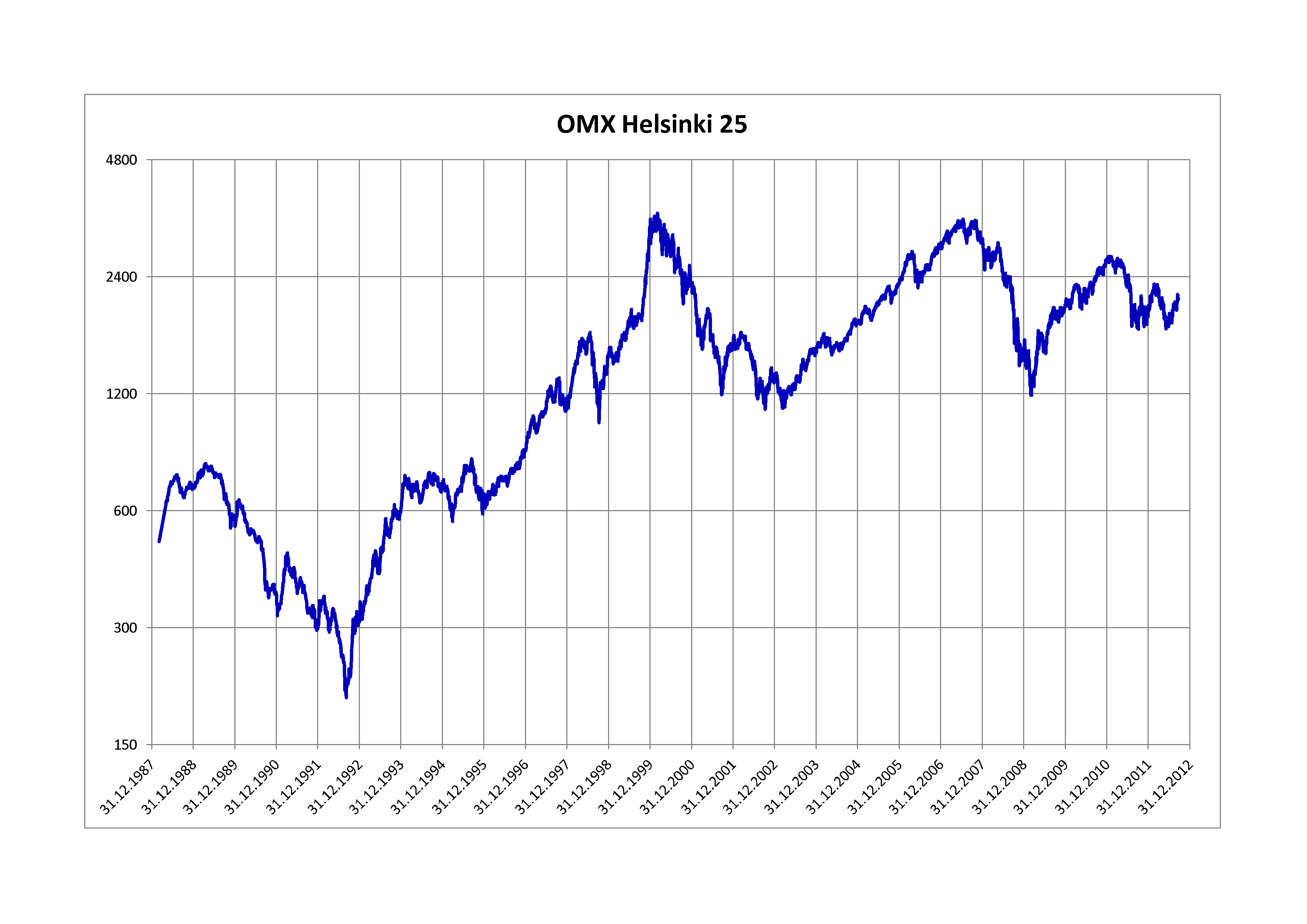
- OMXH25 index performance between 1988 and 2012
- Foundation: 4 March 1988
- Operator: Nasdaq, Inc.
- Exchanges: Nasdaq Helsinki
- Constituents: 25
- Type: Large cap
- Weighting method: Capitalization-weighted
- Website: Official website
- ISIN: FI0008900212
- Reuters: .OMXH25
- Bloomberg: HEX25:IND

OMX Helsinki 25 (OMXH25, formerly HEX25) is a stock market index for the 25 most traded stocks on the Nasdaq Helsinki stock exchange. It is a price return and capitalization-weighted index. The maximum weight for a single stock is limited to 10 percent.

The OMXH25 index started on 4 March 1988 with a base value of 500. It is reconstituted semi-annually on the first trading day in February and August and rebalanced quarterly in February, May, August and November. The original name of the index was HEX25, but following the merger of Optionsmäklarna (OM AB) and Helsinki Stock Exchange (HEX Plc), it was changed to OMXH25 on 15 November 2004.

On 30 June 2014, Nasdaq launched a total return version of the OMX Helsinki 25 index, the OMX Helsinki 25 Gross Index (OMXH25GI). Unlike the regular OMXH25 index, the OMXH25GI includes reinvested dividends.

== Components ==
As of July 2025, the index is composed of the following 25 listings.

Ticker	Company	GICS sector
ELISA.HE	Elisa	Communication Services
FORTUM.HE	Fortum	Utilities
HIAB.HE	Hiab	Industrials
HUH1V.HE	Huhtamäki	Industrials
KALMAR.HE	Kalmar B	Industrials
KEMIRA.HE	Kemira	Materials
KESKOB.HE	Kesko B	Consumer Staples
KOJAMO.HE	Kojamo	Real Estate
KNEBV.HE	KONE	Industrials
KCR.HE	Konecranes	Industrials
MANTA.HE	Mandatum	Financials
METSO.HE	Metso	Industrials
NESTE.HE	Neste	Energy
NOKIA.HE	Nokia	Information Technology
TYRES.HE	Nokian Tyres	Consumer Discretionary
NDA-FI.HE	Nordea	Financials
ORNBV.HE	Orion	Health Care
OUT1V.HE	Outokumpu	Materials
QTCOM.HE	Qt Group	Information Technology
SAMPO.HE	Sampo A	Financials
STERV.HE	Stora Enso R	Materials
TIETO.HE	TietoEVRY	Information Technology
UPM.HE	UPM-Kymmene	Materials
VALMT.HE	Valmet	Industrials
WRT1V.HE	Wärtsilä	Industrials

== Annual returns ==
The following table shows the annual development of the OMX Helsinki 25 since 1988.

Year	Closing level	Change in index	
Year	Closing level	points	percent
1988	696.16		
1989	563.46	−132.70	−19.06 %
1990	370.48	−192.98	−34.25 %
1991	301.17	−69.31	−18.71 %
1992	313.31	12.14	4.03 %
1993	602.59	289.28	92.33 %
1994	687.68	85.09	14.12 %
1995	623.87	−63.81	−9.28 %
1996	863.69	239.82	38.44 %
1997	1,131.33	267.64	30.99 %
1998	1,486.97	355.64	31.44 %
1999	3,222.83	1,735.86	116.74 %
2000	2,321.51	−901.32	−27.97 %
2001	1,600.99	−720.52	−31.04 %
2002	1,293.16	−307.83	−19.23 %
2003	1,530.98	237.82	18.39 %
2004	1,830.98	300.00	19.60 %
2005	2,301.26	470.28	25.68 %
2006	2,910.49	609.23	26.47 %
2007	3,010.11	99.62	3.42 %
2008	1,515.65	−1,494.46	−49.65 %
2009	2,032.59	516.94	34.11 %
2010	2,628.48	595.89	29.32 %
2011	1,942.06	−686.42	−26.11 %
2012	2,210.02	267.96	13.80 %
2013	2,835.17	625.15	28.29 %
2014	2,988.08	152.91	5.39 %
2015	3,359.38	371.30	12.43 %
2016	3,680.08	320.70	9.55 %
2017	3,917.97	237.89	6.46 %
2018	3,685.16	−232.81	−5.94 %
2019	4,221.98	536.82	14.57 %
2020	4,586.15	364.17	8.63 %
2021	5,571.97	985.82	21.50 %
2022	4,825.44	−746.53	−13.40 %
2023	4,509.09	−316.35	−6.56 %
2024	4,315.87	−193.22	−4.29 %
