= Matias Kivikko Arraño =

Finnish footballer (born 2003)

Personal information
- Full name: Matias Alberto Kivikko Arraño
- Date of birth: 5 December 2003 (age 22)
- Place of birth: Finland
- Position: Right back

Team information
- Current team: IFK Mariehamn (on loan from Ilves)

Youth career
- 2009–2020: Honka
- 2021–2022: → Venezia (loan)

Senior career*
Years	Team	Apps	(Gls)
2019–2022	Honka II	6	(0)
2021–2022	→ Venezia (loan)	0	(0)
2022	→ Jaro (loan)	12	(0)
2022	→ JBK (loan)	4	(0)
2023	TPS	23	(0)
2024–	Ilves	10	(0)
2025–	→ IFK Mariehamn (loan)	0	(0)

International career^{‡}
2019	Finland U16	2	(0)
2019–2020	Finland U17	10	(0)
2021–2022	Finland U19	6	(0)
- * Club domestic league appearances and goals as of 19 October 2024 ‡ National team caps and goals as of 16 November 2023

Matias Alberto Kivikko Arraño (born 5 December 2003) is a Finnish professional football defender, playing as a right back for Veikkausliiga side IFK Mariehamn, on loan from Ilves.

== Club career ==
On 28 April 2024, Kivikko Arraño debuted in Veikkausliiga with Ilves, in a 1–0 away win against IFK Mariehamn.

On 29 January 2025, he was loaned out to IFK Mariehamn.

== Personal life ==
Born to a Chilean mother and a Finnish father in Finland, where he was also raised, Kivikko Arraño holds dual Finnish-Chilean citizenship.

== Career statistics ==
As of 27 February 2025

Appearances and goals by club, season and competition
Club	Season	League			Cup (Note: Includes Suomen Cup)		League cup (Note: Includes Ykköscup and Finnish League Cup)		Europe		Total	
Club	Season	Division	Apps	Goals	Apps	Goals	Apps	Goals	Apps	Goals	Apps	Goals
Honka Akatemia	2019	Kakkonen	2	0	–		–		–		2	0
Honka Akatemia	2020	Kakkonen	3	0	–		–		–		3	0
Honka Akatemia	2021	Kakkonen	0	0	–		–		–		0	0
Honka Akatemia	2022	Kakkonen	1	0	–		–		–		1	0
Honka Akatemia	Total		6	0	0	0	0	0	0	0	6	0
Jaro (loan)	2022	Ykkönen	12	0	–		–		–		12	0
Jakobstads BK (loan)	2022	Kakkonen	4	0	–		–		–		4	0
TPS	2023	Ykkönen	23	0	0	0	2	0	–		25	0
TPS Akatemia	2023	Kolmonen	1	0	–		–		–		1	0
Ilves	2024	Veikkausliiga	10	0	0	0	1	0	1 (Note: Appearance in UEFA Conference League)	0	12	0
Ilves	2025	Veikkausliiga	0	0	0	0	2	0	0	0	2	0
Ilves	Total		10	0	0	0	3	0	1	0	14	0
IFK Mariehamn (loan)	2025	Veikkausliiga	0	0	0	0	2	0	–		2	0
Career total			56	0	0	0	6	0	1	0	63	0

== Honours ==
Ilves

- Veikkausliiga runner-up: 2024
