= Outotec =

Defunct Finnish technology company

Outotec Oyj
- Type: Julkinen osakeyhtiö
- Traded as: Nasdaq Helsinki: OTE1V
- Industry: Basic resources, engineering
- Founded: 2006
- Defunct: 1 July 2020
- Headquarters: Espoo, Finland
- Key people: Markku Teräsvasara (President and CEO); Matti Alahuhta (Chairman)
- Products: Metal and mineral processing machinery and process engineering
- Revenue: €1,276.5 million (2018)
- Operating income: −€66.1 million (2018)
- Net income: −€67.3 million(2018)
- Total assets: €481.5 million(2018)
- Total equity: €377.4 million (2018)
- Number of employees: 4,012 (2018)
- Subsidiaries: Larox
- Website: www.outotec.com

Outotec Oyj (Outokumpu Technology prior to 24 April 2007) was a Finnish company, headquartered in Espoo, aimed at providing technologies and services for the metal and mineral processing industries. In 2020, Outotec merged with Metso Minerals and new company is called Metso Outotec.

The firm concentrated on producing machines and methods which facilitate the various stages of extractive metallurgy and mineral processing from ore through to pure metal or mineral, including the grinding and physical separation of ores and the smelting and leaching of base and precious metals. The company also provides engineering and after-sales services for its products.

Outotec was previously a wholly owned business area of Outokumpu, having been established in the late 1940s, but it was spun off as a separate entity in June 2006 when the parent company decided to concentrate on its primary concern of stainless steel. A listing on the Helsinki Stock Exchange followed shortly afterwards, and the company was promoted to the benchmark OMX Helsinki 25 as a result of the index's February 2007 reclassification.
