= Metso (2020–present) =

Finnish industrial company

Metso Corporation
- Native name: Metso Oyj
- Company type: Julkinen osakeyhtiö
- Traded as: Nasdaq Helsinki: METSO
- Industry: Industrial machinery
- Predecessor: Metso; Outotec
- Founded: 1 July 2020; 5 years ago
- Headquarters: Rauhalanpuisto 9, Espoo, Finland
- Key people: Kari Stadigh (Chairman), Sami Takaluoma (President and CEO)
- Products: Industrial company serving the mining, construction and recycling industries
- Number of employees: 15,600 (2020)
- Website: www.metso.com

Metso Corporation (natively Metso Oyj) is a Finnish publicly traded company established in 2020 when Outotec and Metso Minerals merged. It is focusing on providing technology and services for mining, aggregates, recycling, and metal refining industries. The company is headquartered in Matinkylä, Espoo, in Finland.

The European Commission accepted Metso's and Outotec's merger on 13 May 2020 and the company started operations on 1 July 2020.

The company changed its name from Metso Outotec to Metso in May 2023. It moved its headquarters from Helsinki to Espoo in September 2023.

== Organization ==
Sami Takaluoma is the company's president and CEO. Mikael Lilius, former chairman of the Board of Metso, is the chairman of the board, and Matti Alahuhta, former chairman of the board of Outotec, is the deputy chairman of the board. The company employs almost 17,000 people worldwide in approximately 50 countries.

In February 2023, Metso Outotec board of directors announced a proposal to shareholders on company name change from Metso Outotec Corporation to Metso Corporation. The grounds for the proposal were that the post-merger integration of the two companies had been completed and that the company strategy going forward focused on a strong unified company brand. Shareholder vote on the proposal was scheduled for annual general meeting on 3 May 2023. The name was changed on 4 May 2023.

On November 1, 2024 Sami Takaluoma became President and CEO, succeeding Pekka Vauramo.
