= Robert Lavonius =

Finnish businessman

vuorineuvos Robert Johannes Lavonius
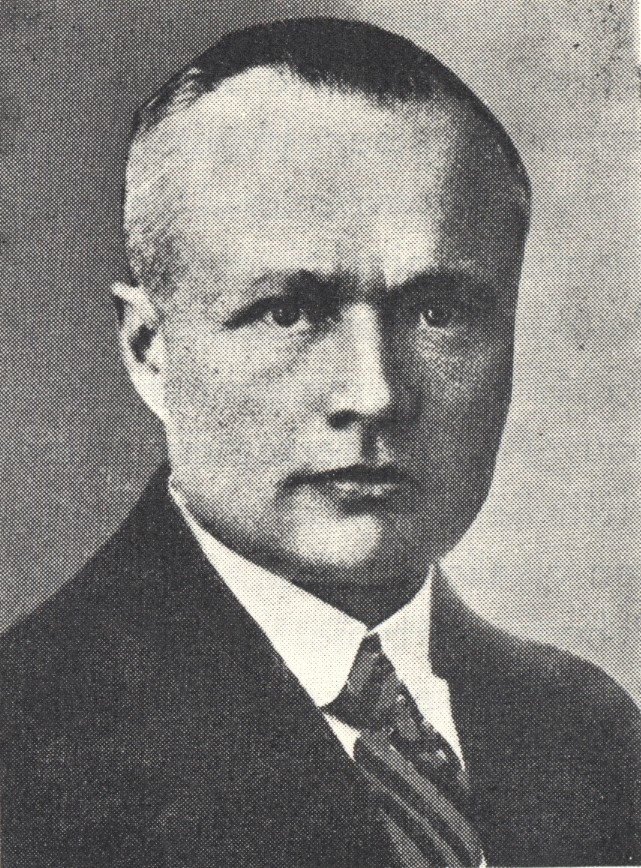
- Born: 16 December 1879; Helsinki, Grand Duchy of Finland
- Died: 2 January 1967 (aged 87); Helsinki, Finland
- Education: Engineer (1905)
- Board member of: see →Board memberships
- Spouse: Mary Anna Charlotta née Ramsay
- Children: Henrik Robert (1915–1996); Hans Wilhelm Robert (1916–1940)
- Parent(s): Wilhelm Lavonius and Maria Francisca née Westzynthius
- Awards: vuorineuvos (1931); Commander of the White Rose of Finland, 2nd Class; Cross of Liberty, 2nd Class; Cross of Liberty, 3rd Class; Medal of Liberty, 2nd Class; Memorial Medal for War of Freedom; Memorial Medal for Winter War

Atlantic Rederi
- In office 1923–1924

Manager of Kone- ja Siltarakennus
- In office 1929–1937
- Preceded by: Julius Stjernvall
- Succeeded by: Yrjö Vesa

Manager of Hietalahti Shipyard and Engineering Works
- In office 1929–1936

Manager of Crichton-Vulcan
- In office 1930–1936
- Preceded by: Allan Staffans

Manager of Teijon Tehtaat
- In office 1944–1955

Robert Johannes Lavonius (16 December 1879 – 2 January 1967) was a Finnish businessman, engineer and vuorineuvos.

Lavonius did his early career in German, Swiss, United States and Canadian companies, and Finnish Suomen Metalliteollisuuskonttori and Tampereen Pellava ja Rauta-teollisuus Oy. He worked in managing positions in Kone ja Silta and its subsidiaries Atlantic Rederi, Hietalahti Shipyard and Engineering Works and Crichton-Vulcan; he became company manager in 1929. In 1936 Kone ja Silta was taken over by Wärtsilä. As Lavonius could not get along with manager Wilhelm Wahlforss, he left the company and worked in arms industry until end of World War II.

Before his retirement, Lavonius led Teijon Tehtaat in 1944–1955.

Lavonius was married and he had two children.

== Early life and studies ==
Lavonius was born in Helsinki; his parents were judge Wilhelm Lavonius and Maria Francisca née Westzynthius. His brothers Magnus and Wilhelm Alexander became later notable businessmen. Lavonius graduated in Finnish coeducational school in 1899 and in 1905 he graduated engineer in Polytechnical Institute.

== Early career ==
During 1905–1906 Lavonius worked for German company A.G. Görlitzer Maschinenbau-Anstalt und Eisengiesserei. In 1907 he started in Tampereen Pellava ja Rauta-teollisuus Oy as head of drawing office. He changed to Suomen Metalliteollisuuskonttori where he worked until 1911. In 1911–1912 Lavonius worked for number of companies in Germany, Switzerland, United States and Canada. He returned to Tampereen Pellava ja Rauta-teollisuus in 1913 and worked as machine shop manager.

== Kone- ja Siltarakennus ==
In 1918 Lavonius became deputy director in Helsinki-based Kone- ja Siltarakennus Oy (Kone ja Silta). The company, managed by Julius Stjernvall, grew strongly through acquisitions during the following years and Lavonius worked in management positions in parallel in its subsidiaries. In 1923–1924 Lavonius managed shipowner Atlantic Rederi Oy. Lavonius was appointed in 1927 deputy director of Hietalahti Shipyard and Engineering Works which Kone ja Silta had taken over in 1926. In October 1928 Kone ja Silta gained majority share of Turku-based shipbuilder Crichton-Vulcan. Just few months after, in March 1929 Julius Stjernvall resigned for health reasons, and Lavonius became company manager of Kone ja Silta and Hietalahti yard in 1929 and Crichton-Vulcan in 1930. Lavonius continued the company expansion, and in 1932 Kone ja Silta bought Kotka Engineering Works.

Since the 1920 Lavonius was board member in number of companies. He was entitled vuorineuvos in 1931.

Kone ja Silta was taken over by Wärtsilä in 1936. Lavonius could not get along with the manager Wilhelm Wahlforss and left his post in 1937.

== Arms industry and Teijon Tehtaat ==
In 1937 Lavonius applied position of joint manager of Suomen Gummitehdas, Suomen Kaapelitehdas and Nokia, but he was not successful. Subsequently, until the end of World War II his main activity was working in two state-owned arms industry companies as chairman of the board. During 1944–1955 Lavonius managed Teijon Tehtaat Oy after which he retired at age of 75.

== Board memberships ==
- Atlantic Rederi Oy (1919–1924)
- saving and pension fund Ilmarinen (1919–1944)
- Ab Tool Oy (1929–1929)
- Finnish Employers' Mutual Strike Insurance Company (1922–1931)
- Oy G.H.H. Ab (1923–1944)
- Ab Wärtsilä Oy (1924–1929)
- Ab Karelia Wood (1925–1929)
- Pohjoismaiden Yhdyspankki (1929–1944)
- Suomen Gummitehdas Oy (1930–1938)
- Finnish Industrialis' Mutual Fire Insurance Company (1932–1944)
- Suomen Kaapelitehdas Oy (1936–1962)
- Valtion Tykkitehdas (1937–1945)
- Betoni- ja Puurakennus Oy (1939→)
- Valtion Sytytintehdas (1940–1945)
- Teijon tehtaat Oy (1942→)
- Oy AGA Ab (1947→)
- Ammus-sytytin Oy (1960→)

== Family ==
Lavonius was married in 1914 to Mary Anna Charlotta née Ramsay (1888–1979), daughter of vuorineuvos Wolter Ramsay and Alice Anna née Wolff. The couple had two sons: Henrik Robert (1915–1996) and Hans Wilhelm Robert (1916–1940).
