= Mikael Lilius =

Percy Henrik Mikael Lilius (b. December 3, 1949 Helsinki) is the former President and Chief Executive Officer of the energy company Fortum. He served as the chairman of the packaging firm Huhtamäki. Lilius is the chairman of Metso Outotec.
