= Matti Alahuhta =

Finnish business executive

Matti Juhani Alahuhta
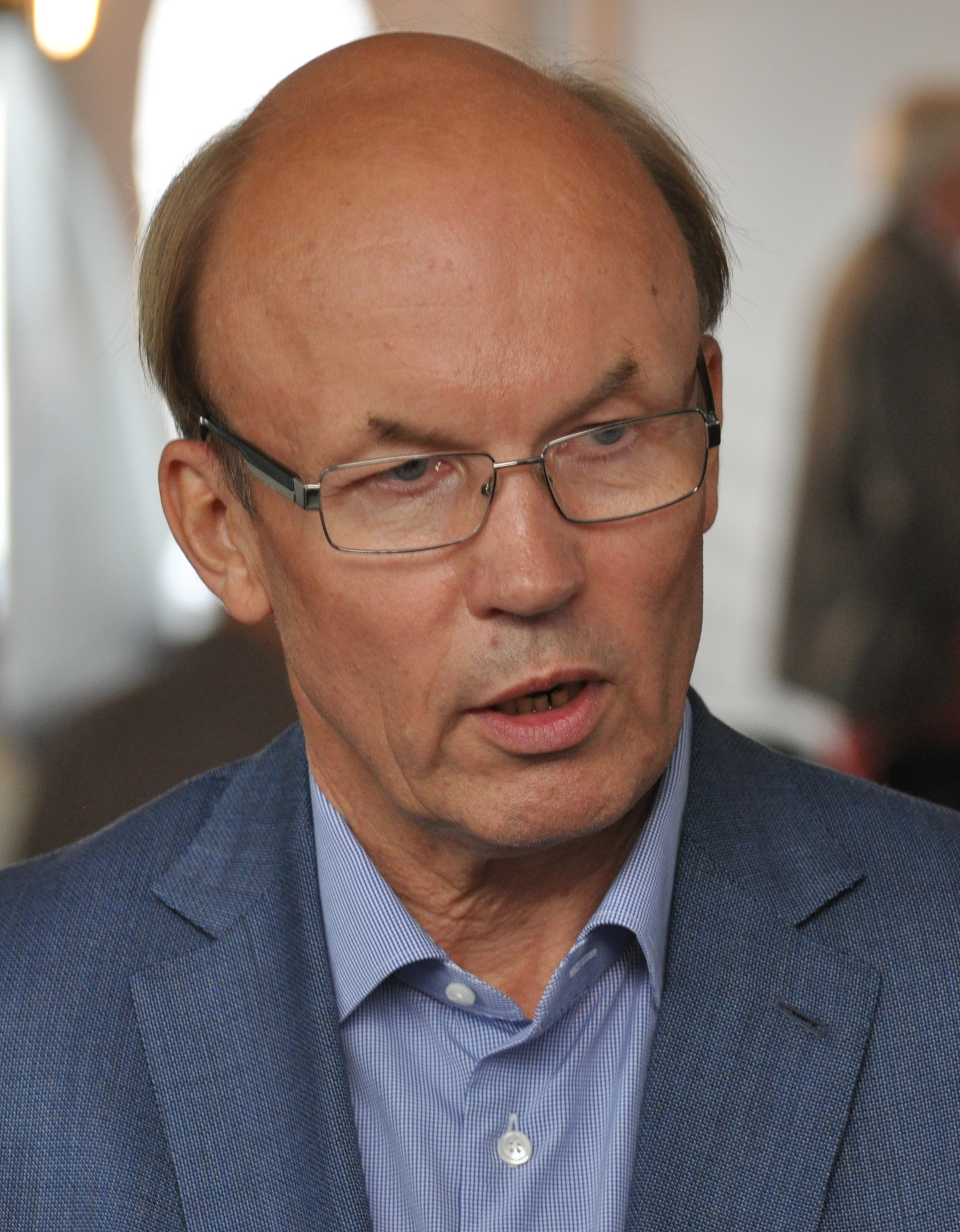
- Alahuhta in 2013
- Born: June 22, 1952 (age 73); Alahärmä, Finland
- Occupation: Chairman of DevCo Partners Oy

Matti Juhani Alahuhta (born 22 June 1952 in Alahärmä, Finland) is a Finnish businessman. He was the President & CEO of KONE Corporation (2005–2014). Earlier he worked 26 years at Nokia Corporation and was Member of Nokia's Executive Board from 1993 to 2004. He is Chairman of the Board of DevCo Partners Oy. He is also Member of the Board of Directors of Kone (2003-) and Volvo (2014-).

== Biography ==
=== Early life and education ===
Matti Alahuhta attained his M.Sc. (Tech.) in 1976 and D.Sc. (Tech.) in 1990 at the Helsinki University of Technology. His dissertation was titled "Global Growth Strategies for High Technology Challengers". Alahuhta has also attended executive education qualifications from IMD Business School in Switzerland and received an Honorary Doctorate from Tampere University of Technology.

=== Career ===
Alahuhta joined Nokia as a Research Engineer in 1975. From 1982 to 1984 he was a Sales Director at Rank Xerox and he returned to Nokia as a Sales Director for the Transmissions Systems Business Unit at a time when Nokia started its global expansion in its telecommunications networks business. After different roles with increasing responsibilities, he was appointed as President of Nokia Telecommunications and as Member of the Executive Board in 1993. In 1998, he was appointed President of Nokia Mobile Phones and in 2004 he was appointed Executive Vice President and Chief Strategy Officer of the Nokia Group. Under Alahuhta's leadership from 2005 to 2014, KONE's global market share doubled and its market capitalization six folded.

Matti Alahuhta has also been the Vice Chairman of Metso Outotec and a board member of ABB, the Chairman of Aalto University, The International Institute for Management Development IMD (Switzerland), The Confederation of Finnish Industries and The Technology Industries of Finland, Vice Chairman of the Finnish Funding Agency for Innovation TEKES, and a board member of Finnish Business and Policy Forum EVA.

=== Marriage and children ===
Matti Alahuhta is married to his wife Leena and they have two children.

== Awards ==
In 1993, Matti Alahuhta was designated as a Knight for the 1st Class of the Order of the White Rose of Finland. In 2003, he was given the Commander of the Order of the White Rose of Finland and in 2013, Commander, First Class, of the Order of the White Rose of Finland.

The European Business Press (EBP), representing 55 Europe's leading financial and economic publications in 28 countries, presented Matti Alahuhta the "European Manager of the Year 2009 Award”.
