= Outline of industrial machinery =

Overview of and topical guide to industrial machinery

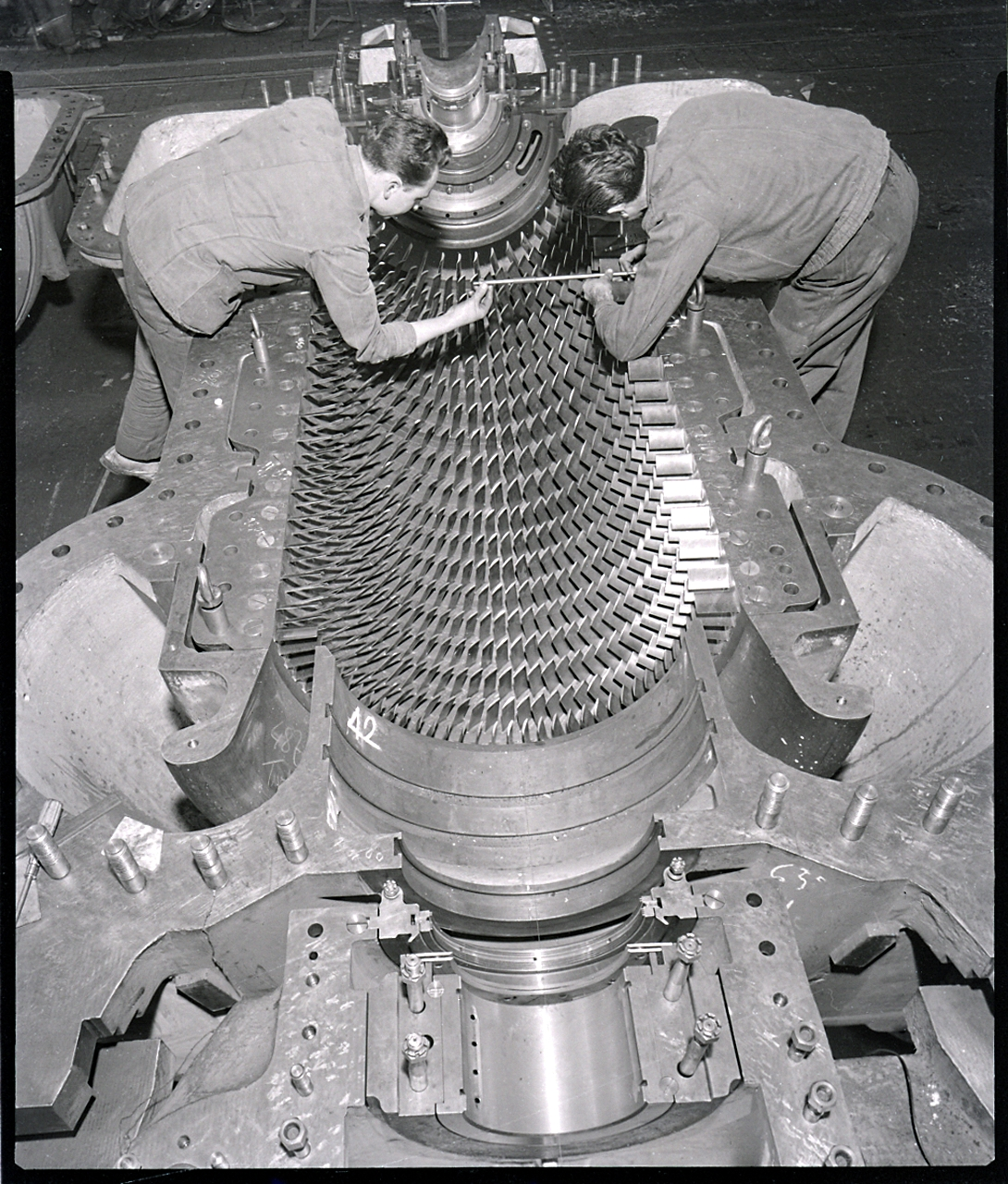
Industry in Italy, photo by Paolo Monti

The following outline is provided as an overview of and topical guide to industrial machinery:

== Essence of industrial machinery ==
- Heavy equipment
- Hardware
- Industrial process
- Machine
- Machine tool
- Tool

== Industrial machines ==
- Agricultural equipment
- Assembly line
- Industrial robot
- Oil refinery
- Packaging and labeling
- Paper mill
- Sawmill
- Smelter
- Water wheel

== Industrial processes ==
- Bessemer process
- Food processing
- Manufacturing
- Mining
- Packaging and labeling

== History of industrial machinery ==
- History of agricultural machinery
- History of assembly lines
- History of the bessemer process
- History of heavy equipment
- History of industrial robots
- History of machines
- History of machine tools
- History of oil refineries
- History of packaging and labeling
- History of paper mills
- History of smelting
- History of water wheels

== See also ==
- Outline of industry
