= Marce Rendic =

Finnish radio personality

Marce Rendic (born in Helsinki) is a Finnish radio personality. He has before worked for YLE, Radio Suomi and YleQ, until he moved to Nelonen Media's rock music station called Radio Rock, in 2007.

Rendic is of Chilean descent. He has lived for some time of his life in South America, where he has trained as a steward.
