= Valmet =

Finnish company

Valmet Oyj
- Type: Public
- Traded as: Nasdaq Helsinki: VALMT; OMXH25 component
- Industry: Industrial technology, automation, and services
- Founded: December 2013; 12 years ago
- Headquarters: Espoo, Finland
- Key people: Pekka Vauramo (chairman); Thomas Hinnerskov (president and CEO)
- Revenue: ▼EUR 5,197 million (2025); EUR 5,359 million (2024)
- Net income: ▲EUR 620 million (2025); EUR 609 million (2024)
- Number of employees: 18,500 (2025)
- Website: www.valmet.com

Valmet Oyj is a Finnish listed industrial technology company providing process technologies, automation systems, and services for the pulp, paper, energy, and broader process industries. Headquartered in Espoo, Finland, the company traces its industrial roots back over 225 years and operates as a publicly listed entity on Nasdaq Helsinki.

Following a major structural reorganization in 2025 under its "Lead the Way" strategy, Valmet operates across an integrated customer-lifecycle framework supported by a centralized global supply architecture. The company maintains a physical presence in approximately 40 countries through more than 110 service centers, 160 sales offices, 76 production units, and 34 research and development (R&D) centers.

== History ==
=== Origins and industrial background ===
Valmet's industrial roots extend back more than 200 years to early Finnish state-supported shipbuilding and textile manufacturing. One of its earliest precursors was a Viapori shipyard established in the 1750s at Suomenlinna, which contributed to Finland's early industrial capabilities.

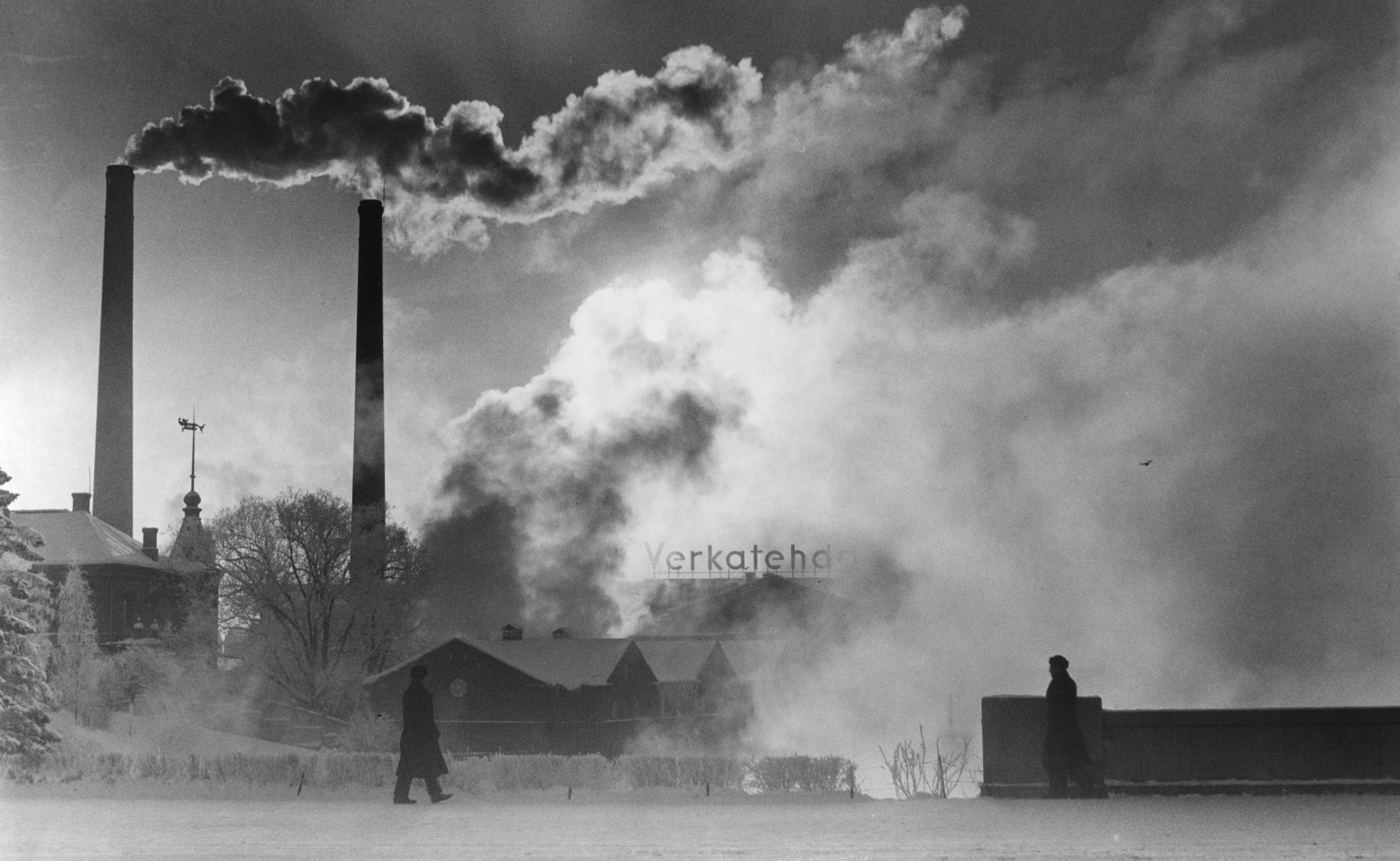
Textile factory on a winter day in Tampere

During the 19th century, Finland's industrial base expanded into textiles and early mechanical engineering. This transition supported the emergence of early textile and paper-processing industries. A notable example is the Jokioisten Verkatehdas woollen mill, founded in 1797, which later became part of Valmet's industrial textiles heritage through the Tamfelt business line.

Industrial consolidation in the Tampere region further accelerated this development. In 1861, the merger of a linen factory and a metal workshop contributed to the formation of Tampella, an important Finnish engineering company. Tampella contributed to the development of machinery production, forming a foundation for later heavy industry and paper machine manufacturing in Finland.

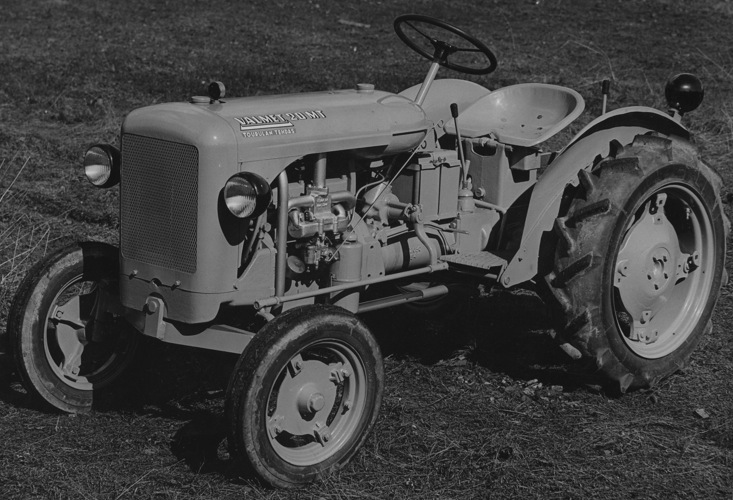
Valmet 20 tractor

=== Formation of Valmet (1940s–1950s) ===
Following the World War II, Finland reorganized its state-owned industrial assets to support reconstruction and fulfill war reparations to the Soviet Union. In 1950, these entities were formally unified as Valtion Metallitehtaat ("State Metalworks"), later shortened to Valmet. The company initially focused on manufacturing locomotives, ships, and defense-related equipment.

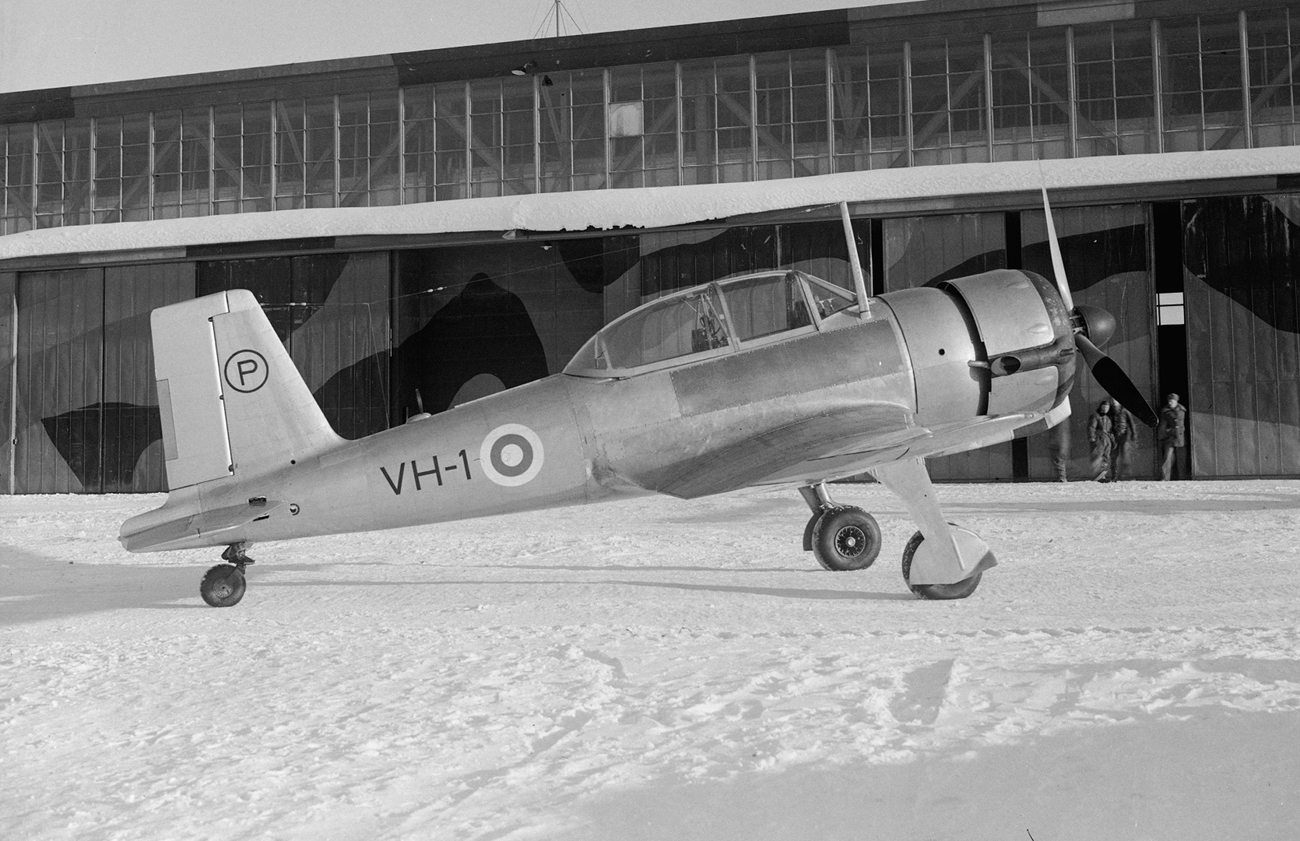
A prototype of Valmet Vihuri (VH-1) in February 1951.

During the 1950s, Valmet also developed aviation and engineering capabilities, including military trainer aircraft production (Valmet Vihuri). Over time, the company shifted increasingly toward industrial machinery, particularly for forestry, pulp, and paper sectors.

=== Expansion into pulp and paper machinery (1960s–1980s) ===
From the 1960s onward, Valmet became a major global supplier of pulp and paper production machinery. It developed complete production lines for paper, board, and tissue manufacturing and expanded exports significantly, particularly to Europe and the Soviet Union.

During the 1980s and 1990s, Valmet expanded through acquisitions, including Dominion Engineering Works (Canada, 1984), Karlstads Mekaniska Verkstad (Sweden, 1986), and Tampella's board machinery operations (Finland, 1992). At the same time, the company developed early distributed control systems, embedding automation and process intelligence into industrial machinery.

=== Merger into Metso (1999–2013) ===
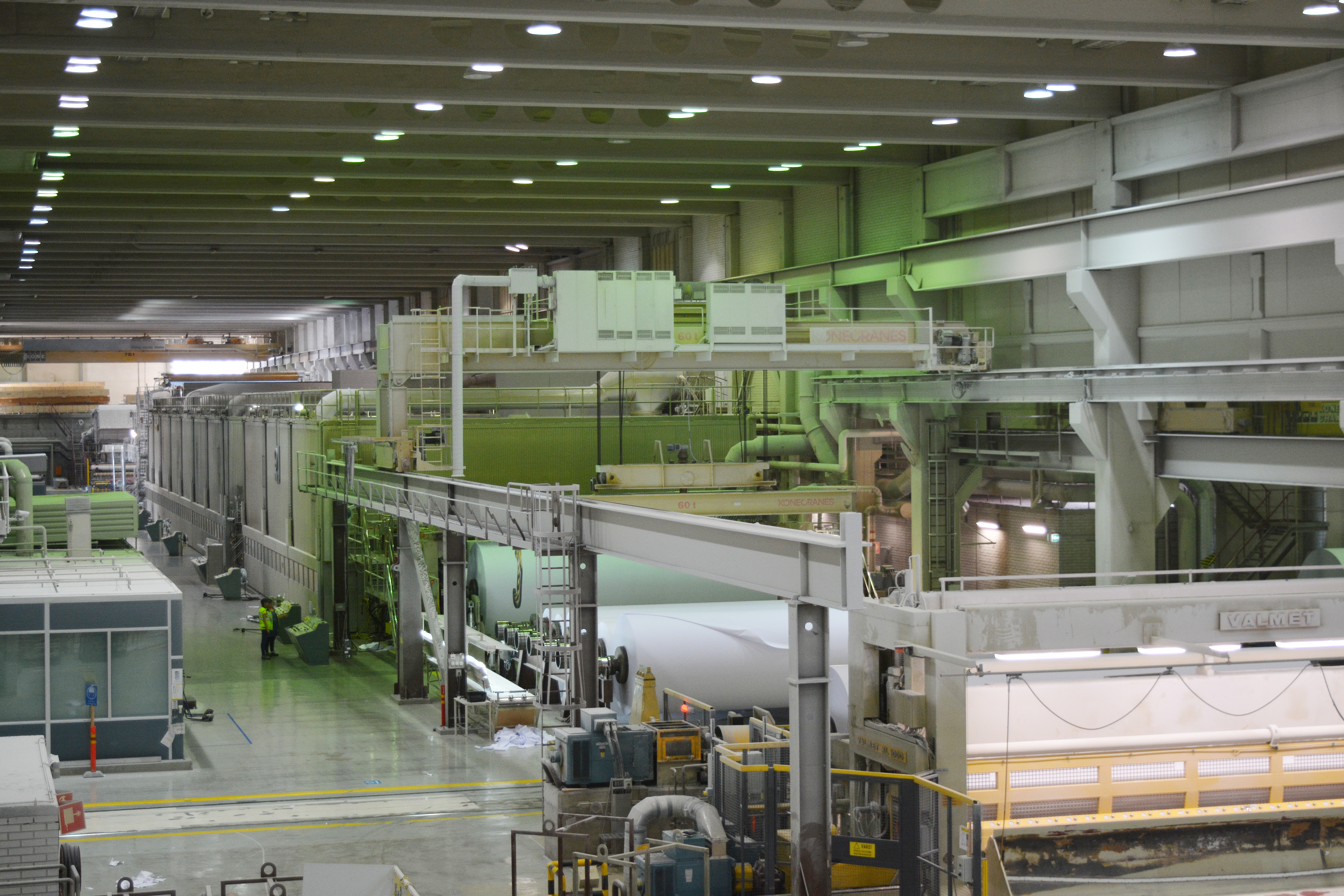
A photo of Kymi PM 9 taken from the dry end.

In 1999, Valmet merged with Rauma Oyj to form Metso. Following the merger, Valmet's operations became part of Metso's Paper business unit. During this period, Valmet's legacy technologies continued to evolve within Metso's pulp, paper, and power division, while Metso also expanded into minerals and mining technologies. At the end of 2009, Metso acquired Tamfelt, a supplier of technical textiles.

=== Valmet 2013– ===
In 2013, Metso completed a demerger that separated its pulp, paper, and power business into an independent company under the Valmet name. The newly independent Valmet Oyj began trading on Nasdaq Helsinki in January 2014. In the years following the spin-off, Valmet focused on strengthening its core technologies, expanding service operations, and increasing its automation capabilities. In 2015 Valmet acquired Metso's Process Automation Systems business to form its own Automation business unit, which significantly expanded its digital and control system portfolio.

In early 2019, Valmet expanded its North American footprint and service portfolio through two acquisitions. The company first acquired GL&V, a technology and services supplier for the pulp and paper industry that employed approximately 650 people. GL&V focused on supplying new chemical pulping and paper production technologies, upgrading existing machinery, and providing aftermarket spare parts. This was followed in May 2019 by the purchase of J&L Fiber Services, a Wisconsin-based manufacturer of refiner segments used in pulp and paper refining processes, which brought roughly 100 employees into the organization. Both companies were subsequently integrated into Valmet's Services business line.

At the end of June 2020, Neles was separated from Metso. The State of Finland sold its share of 15 per cent to Valmet. In mid-July, the Swedish company Alfa Laval made an offer to buy Neles. Also Valmet started buying Neles stock. By the autumn, Valmet owned nearly 30 per cent of the stock. Alfa Laval only received the support of a third of Neles owners for its takeover bid, and withdrew from the competition in November. In July 2021, Valmet and Neles agreed to merge. Neles owners obtained 18.8 per cent of the merging company. The companies' synergies were described as substantial at the time of the transaction. Neles was expected to contribute to Valmet's automation systems sales, with its products also intended for the paper industry. Neles merged into Valmet in April 2022, becoming Valmet's fifth business line, Flow Control. After the merger, the company had 17,000 employees, 3,000 of whom came from Neles.

Additional acquisitions included tissue converting technologies, Demuth (equipment suppliers for the wood handling to the pulp industry), and Siemens' Process Gas Chromatography business.

In January 2021, Valmet reported that it would supply the mills of the Swedish company Renewcell with equipment to produce dissolving pulp from recycled clothes and textiles. In May, Valmet announced that it would deliver drying technology to Spinnova, which produces textile fiber from cellulose. Demand for Valmet equipment in the textile recycling sector has been linked to an EU requirement to organize the collection of discarded textiles for recycling by 2025. Valmet had been developing recycling technology with Renewcell for years, and the companies constructed a pilot plant and a factory in Sundsvall together.

In February 2024, it was announced that President and CEO Pasi Laine would be retiring at the end of September 2024. Danish CEO of Mediq, Thomas Hinnerskov, was chosen by Valmet's board of directors to lead the company as the new president and CEO.

In October 2024, Valmet announced that is it cutting 112 jobs to improve "profitability and competitiveness of the business operations". Valmet launched a renewed operating model in 2025 to improve efficiency and strengthen lifecycle-based customer service delivery. Effective July 1, 2025, the company eliminated its separate geographical business layers, moving local market operations closer to five newly defined business areas. Valmet created a centralized Global Supply unit to leverage worldwide economies of scale in procurement and production.

The restructuring involved a headcount reduction of approximately 1,150 white-collar roles globally (including 395 in Finland), generating €80 million in annualized cost savings. The first efficiency gains realized from this operating model transition enabled Valmet to achieve record profitability margins by late 2025.

== Organizational structure ==
Valmet's operational architecture is organized into five business areas inside two primary business segments.

=== Process Performance Solutions ===
Process Performance Solutions segment combines software intelligence with precision hardware to regulate and secure industrial processes. It contains two business areas:

- Automation Solutions focuses on distributed control systems (DCS), quality management systems, and industrial internet applications. Its primary platform (Valmet DNA) integrates process monitoring with machine learning tools to perform predictive maintenance. In 2025, the company expanded this lineup with Valmet DNAe, marking the industry's first fully web-based DCS to achieve ISASecure SSA cybersecurity certification.
- Flow Control incorporates the combined operations of the acquired Neles and Flowrox brands. This unit develops and manufactures automated control valves, emergency shutdown (ESD) valves, industrial pumps, and positioners engineered to withstand high-pressure and highly corrosive environments.

=== Biomaterial Solutions and Services ===
Biomaterial Solutions and Services segment focuses on engineering projects and technologies aligned with the circular bioeconomy, converting renewable or recycled raw fibers into commercial products. It contains three business areas:

- Pulp, Energy and Circularity delivers complete chemical and mechanical pulping lines, chemical recovery systems, and bio-based energy technologies. Its energy portfolio specializes in Circulating Fluidized Bed (CFB) biomass boilers and large-scale waste-to-energy systems designed to comply with strict global emission limits, alongside gasification platforms that convert biomass into industrial syngas.
- Packaging and Paper supplies modular, high-speed production lines engineered for containerboard, cartonboard, and specialty papers.
- Tissue provides customized production lines and components for consumer tissue manufacturing. This unit leverages specialized through-air drying technology to maximize product bulk and softness while utilizing closed-loop water systems.

=== Global Supply and support functions ===
Valmet operates a centralized Global Supply unit that leverages the company's scale in procurement and production logistics. Internal management is divided among multiple corporate support functions: People, Communications and Culture; Finance; Strategy and Transformation; and Legal.

== See also ==
- Valmet Automotive
