= Cream separation =

Separating milk into cream and skimmed milk

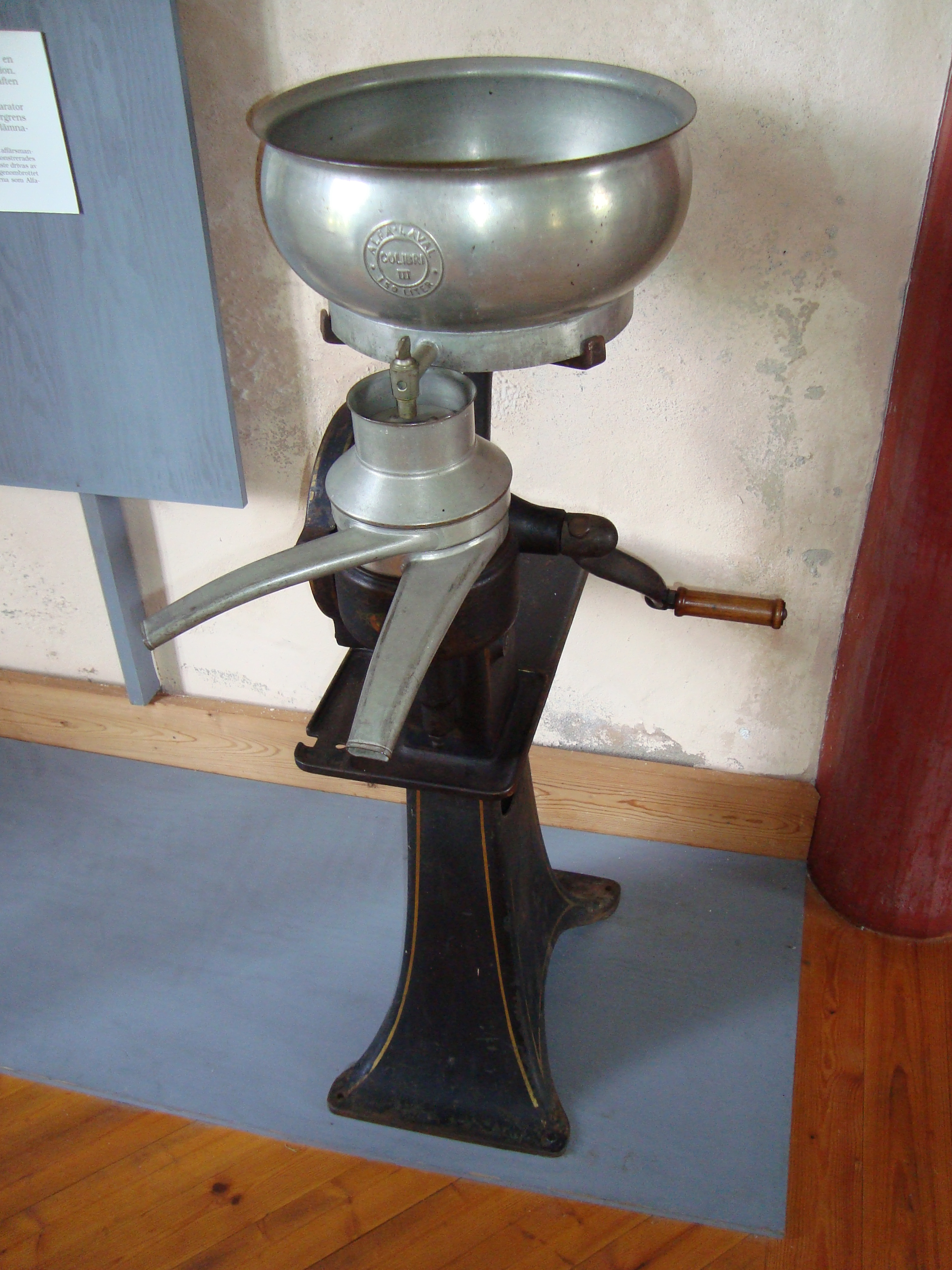
Manual separator in a Swedish museum

Cream separation, milk separation, milk skimming, or milk creaming is the separation of whole milk into cream and skimmed milk.

When left to stand for 12 to 24 hours, fresh milk separates into a cream layer, high in butterfat, over a larger, low-fat milk layer, because water is denser than fat. The cream can then be skimmed off.

Since the late 19th century, the process has been performed more efficiently using a centrifugal cream separator.

In the past, separation was commonly performed on farms. Some of the skimmed milk was consumed, while the rest was used to feed calves and pigs. Enough cream was saved to make butter, and the excess was sold. Today, milk is usually separated in industrial dairies.

In modern dairy production, full-fat and reduced-fat milks are produced by mixing and homogenizing skimmed milk and cream, in order to standardize fat content.

Clotted cream and kaymak are produced by heating whole milk, letting the cream rise, then skimming the semi-solid cream off the top after it cools.

== History ==
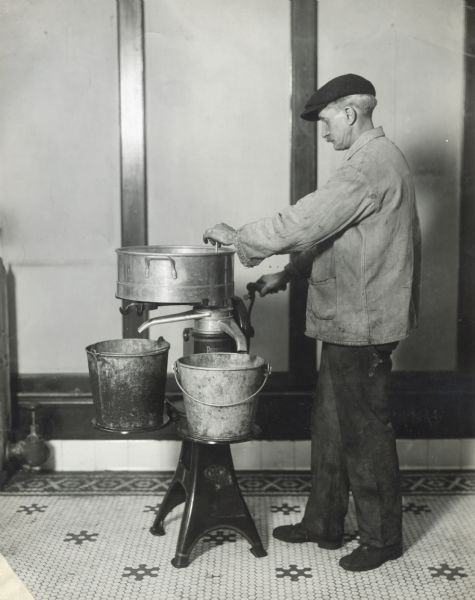
A man operating a manual separator in 1925

Before the advent of centrifugal separators, separation was performed by letting milk sit in a container until the cream floated to the top and could be skimmed off by hand. A variant container-separator had a nozzle at the bottom which was opened to allow the milk to drain off. A window in the side, near the nozzle at the bottom, allowed the operator to observe when the milk was drained.

The centrifugal separator was first manufactured by Gustaf de Laval, making it possible to separate cream from milk faster and more easily, without having to let the milk sit for a time, and risk it turning sour. Possibly because Gustaf de Laval manufactured the first cream separators, many people credit the invention to de Laval. However, many patents appear before his, all of them labelled as 'improvements'. One of the first specifically for cream separation was patented by W. C. L. Lefeldt and C. G. O. Lentsch.

The original centrifugal separators were hand-cranked, as illustrated.

== Mechanism ==
Manual rotation of the separator handle turns a worm gear mechanism which causes the separator bowl to spin.

When the separator is spun, the heavier milk is pulled outward against its walls and the cream, which is lighter, collects in the middle. The cream and milk then flow out separate spouts. After separation, the cream and skimmed milk are mixed together in a certain ratio until the favoured fat content has been set. The ratio is dependent upon the product which is to be produced (low-fat milk, full-fat milk or cream). Some floor model separators were built with a swinging platform attached to the stand. The bucket for collecting the cream was put on the platform, and a much larger bucket was set on the floor to collect the milk. Some floor model separators had two swinging platforms. Smaller versions of separators were called table-top models, for small dairies with only a few cows or goats.

Gustaf de Laval's construction made it possible to start the largest separator factory in the world, Alfa Laval AB. The milk separator represented a significant industrial breakthrough in Sweden. Within the first decade of the 1900s, there were over twenty separator manufacturers in Stockholm. Separators in modified form are also used on ships to purify oil, which may have been their original use, because in its original form de Laval proposed the separator for use in his steam turbine. De Laval's turbine used mechanically lubricated journal bearings which were not insulated from the inside of the turbine. When the steam condensed into water it contaminated the oil. To purify the oil a centrifugal separator was used, which was later adapted to the dairy industry.

The original design had a manual bowl that required manual cleaning. Most modern separators use a self-ejecting centrifuge bowl that can automatically discharge any sedimentary solids that may be present, thus allowing clean-in-place (CIP).

A distinction is made between warm milk skimming and cold milk skimming:

- Warm milk skimming separator: At first the raw milk is heated and then skimmed warm. There is a significant difference in density between cream and skimmed milk, because of the higher temperature.
- Cold milk skimming separator: Because of the lower energy which is used, the production cost will be reduced. Also at cold temperatures, the growth of microorganisms is significantly reduced. In the US, Mexico, Australia and New Zealand, cold milk skimming is on the rise.

== See also ==
- Creaming (chemistry), the separation of emulsions in general

== Bibliography ==
- Green, Don W.; Perry, Robert H. Perry's Chemical Engineers' Handbook (8th Edition). McGraw-Hill Professional, 2007. ISBN 978-0-07-142294-9
