= FGZ =

FGZ may refer to:

- FGZ, grade of the F-series Daihatsu Terios in Indonesia
- FGZ, code for the Flagstaff, Arizona, National Weather Service Weather Forecast Office
- Free Guard Zone, area of a curling ice rink
- Fakultet graditeljskih znanosti, part of the University of Rijeka, publisher of a work by Boris Magaš
