= Haludovo Palace Hotel =

Abandoned modernist resort hotel on Krk, Croatia

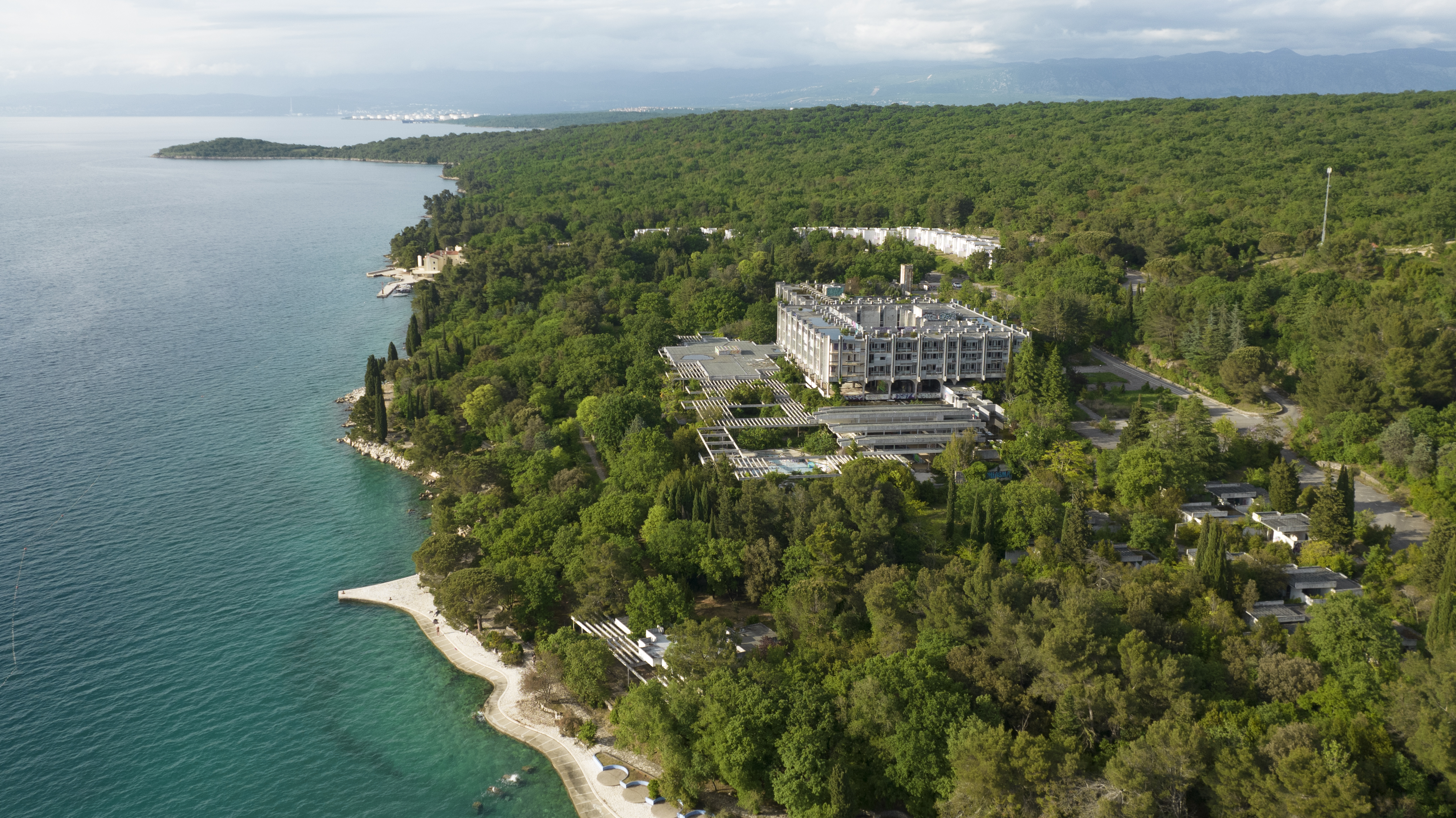
- Hotel Palace in 2026

General information
- Status: Abandoned
- Type: Resort hotel
- Architectural style: Modernist
- Location: Malinska, Krk, Croatia
- Coordinates: 45°07′52″N 14°31′40″E
- Year built: 1969–1972
- Opened: 1972
- Closed: 2002

Design and construction
- Architect: Boris Magaš

The Haludovo Palace Hotel is an abandoned resort hotel near Malinska on the island of Krk, Croatia. It formed the architectural and social centre of Haludovo, a large tourist resort designed by Croatian architect Boris Magaš and constructed between 1969 and 1972 during the rapid expansion of tourism on the Yugoslav Adriatic.

Covering approximately 25 hectares (62 acres), Haludovo was conceived as a self-contained tourist settlement rather than a single hotel. In addition to the Palace, it included Hotel Tamaris, groups of atrium and two-storey villas, the coastal Fishermen's Village, and extensive sports, leisure and service facilities. The first phase was designed for approximately 1,650 guests, while the original planning concept envisaged an eventual capacity of about 5,000 beds.

Haludovo gained international attention in 1972 through a short-lived partnership between the Rijeka-based Yugoslav trading company Brodokomerc and American publisher Bob Guccione, founder of Penthouse. Guccione established the Penthouse Adriatic Club within the Palace, including a casino intended primarily for foreign visitors. The partnership ended the following year amid financial difficulties, but Haludovo continued operating as a conventional holiday resort throughout the 1970s and 1980s.

After the outbreak of the Croatian War of Independence in 1991, the resort lost much of its tourist market and was temporarily used to accommodate refugees. It was privatised during the 1990s and subsequently passed through several ownership structures. The Palace ceased hotel operations around New Year 2002 and has since remained abandoned.

Architectural historians regard Haludovo as one of Magaš's most significant works and an important example of Yugoslav tourist architecture. Although fundamentally modernist, its use of historical urban analogies, varied architectural typologies and expressive forms has been interpreted as anticipating elements of postmodern architecture in Croatia.

== History ==
=== Development and construction ===
Tourism in Malinska had developed on a relatively modest scale before the Second World War, but the expansion of Yugoslavia's tourism industry during the 1960s produced much larger and more complex developments along the Adriatic coast. In 1967, the local hotel enterprise in Malinska became associated with Brodokomerc, a large trading organisation based in Rijeka. Construction of Haludovo began in 1969.

Magaš had previously designed the Solaris tourist complex near Šibenik, where he explored the concept of a large resort conceived as an urban and landscape ensemble. At Haludovo he developed this approach into what architectural historians have described as a hotel city, combining accommodation, recreation, services and landscaping within a single spatial composition.

The resort occupied wooded terrain north of Malinska which slopes gradually towards the Adriatic coast. Instead of concentrating accommodation in a single structure, Magaš distributed different building types through the existing vegetation and linked them by pedestrian routes, terraces and landscaped open spaces.

The principal accommodation consisted of the Hotel Palace, the lower-category Hotel Tamaris, groups of single-storey atrium villas, rows of two-storey villas and the Fishermen's Village on the coast. Together the completed first phase provided approximately 1,650 beds.

=== Penthouse Adriatic Club ===
American publisher Bob Guccione first visited Yugoslavia in 1970 while considering investment in the country's developing tourist industry. After withdrawing from an earlier project in Umag, he came into contact with representatives of Brodokomerc in Rijeka and was shown the Haludovo development on Krk. Negotiations continued for approximately eighteen months and resulted in the creation of the Penthouse Adriatic Club.

The club opened in 1972 and combined the resort's hotel facilities with a casino aimed primarily at foreign guests. Guccione recruited American staff and promoted Haludovo internationally as a luxury gambling, convention and entertainment destination. Organised groups of visitors were brought to nearby Rijeka Airport, including by charter flights, and transported to the resort.

The project attracted attention because it brought American private capital and the commercial culture associated with Penthouse into Yugoslavia's system of socialist self-management. Guccione publicly presented tourism as a means of increasing communication between East and West during the Cold War, while Yugoslav economic policy increasingly regarded international tourism as an important source of foreign currency and economic development.

The Palace's casino and associated entertainment programme had not formed part of Magaš's original architectural concept. Writing about Haludovo in 1972, Magaš noted that he had designed the central garden and communal spaces before knowing who Guccione was or that they would subsequently accommodate the Penthouse operation.

The partnership lasted only about a year. Brodokomerc encountered severe financial difficulties in 1973 and Penthouse withdrew from the project. Haludovo nevertheless continued to operate, shifting away from exclusive gambling tourism towards domestic and international middle-class holidaymakers.

Despite the exclusive image promoted during the Penthouse period, the resort's beaches, promenades and much of its outdoor infrastructure remained accessible to residents and visitors who were not staying at Haludovo. Architectural historian Maroje Mrduljaš has identified this coexistence of commercial tourist facilities and publicly accessible coastal space as an important feature of the resort.

=== Later operation, war and privatisation ===
Following the end of the Penthouse partnership, Haludovo continued operating throughout the 1970s and 1980s as a large conventional resort.

Its circumstances changed substantially at the beginning of the 1990s. Following the outbreak of war in Croatia in 1991, Haludovo lost much of its established tourist clientele and parts of the complex were temporarily used to accommodate refugees from war-affected areas.

Haludovo was privatised in 1995 during Croatia's transition from social ownership to a market economy. The hotel enterprise became Hoteli Haludovo Malinska d.d. and subsequently underwent a series of ownership changes and sales of individual properties.

Around 2000, a company associated with Armenian-Russian businessman Ara Abramyan acquired control of the resort. In 2007, a large shareholding was transferred to the British-registered company Bismass Limited, although Abramyan remained associated with the management and redevelopment proposals for Haludovo.

=== Closure, deterioration and redevelopment ===
The Hotel Palace received its final hotel guests around New Year 2002. Around the same period, most of Hotel Tamaris and several of the atrium villas were demolished. The central Palace complex was left without regular maintenance and progressively lost its glazing, interior fittings, furniture and building services.

Deterioration continued during the following decades. Windows and roof glazing were broken, water penetration damaged parts of the building, and portions of the upper accommodation levels were affected by fire. Vegetation spread across paths and abandoned villas, while graffiti and vandalism became widespread within the Palace.

Despite the extensive damage, studies undertaken in the 2020s found that much of the principal reinforced-concrete structure remained standing and that the original spatial organisation of the Palace was still identifiable.

Numerous redevelopment proposals have been made since the early 2000s. Magaš himself prepared proposals for Haludovo during the 2000s which attempted to adapt the resort to contemporary hotel standards while retaining elements of the original spatial organisation.

A persistent point of dispute concerned the relationship between redevelopment and the coastal zone. Proposals associated with the majority owner sought greater control over the waterfront and maritime domain, while the Municipality of Malinska-Dubašnica maintained that public access to the shoreline and promenade should be preserved.

In September 2022, the Municipal Council of Malinska-Dubašnica initiated a procedure to repeal the existing detailed development plan for Haludovo. The municipality stated that future planning documents would establish new conditions for reconstruction and development within the tourist zone.

In 2024, Zagreb-based Futura Inženjering entered into an arrangement with Hoteli Haludovo Malinska to prepare and coordinate redevelopment activities. Initial work concentrated on the Fishermen's Village and neighbouring bungalows rather than the abandoned Palace.

As of 2026, the Hotel Palace remained abandoned and severely deteriorated, while some other accommodation within the wider Haludovo area had been renovated or returned to tourist use.

== Architecture ==
=== Planning and urban concept ===
Magaš conceived Haludovo as an integrated architectural and landscape composition rather than a collection of independent hotel buildings. Its spatial organisation made metaphorical reference to a historical city. The Palace occupied the dominant position of a palace or castle, while linear accommodation buildings at the perimeter suggested city walls and groups of smaller atrium villas formed an interior settlement.

The main reception structure marked an entrance to this notional city, while the Fishermen's Village created a separate coastal environment derived more explicitly from the scale and spatial character of traditional Adriatic settlements.

Mrduljaš and Turato have characterised the overall composition as a collage of different architectural and urban typologies. Rather than following a strictly functionalist approach, the resort employed historical and regional references within a modern construction and planning framework. In this respect, Haludovo has been interpreted as marking a transition towards the more eclectic and representational approaches associated with postmodernism.

The relatively low density of construction allowed substantial areas of existing vegetation to remain between buildings. The resort was organised around pedestrian movement through wooded areas and sequences of enclosed, covered and open spaces descending towards the coast.

=== Hotel Palace ===
The Hotel Palace was the visual and functional centre of the resort. Its principal entrance was positioned on the higher eastern side of the building, from which a central route continued through the interior towards terraces, swimming pools and the sea.

The main communal area was organised around a large double-height internal atrium surrounded by a gallery. Reception areas, restaurants, bars, shops and entertainment spaces were grouped around this central volume, while the building stepped down with the natural slope of the terrain.

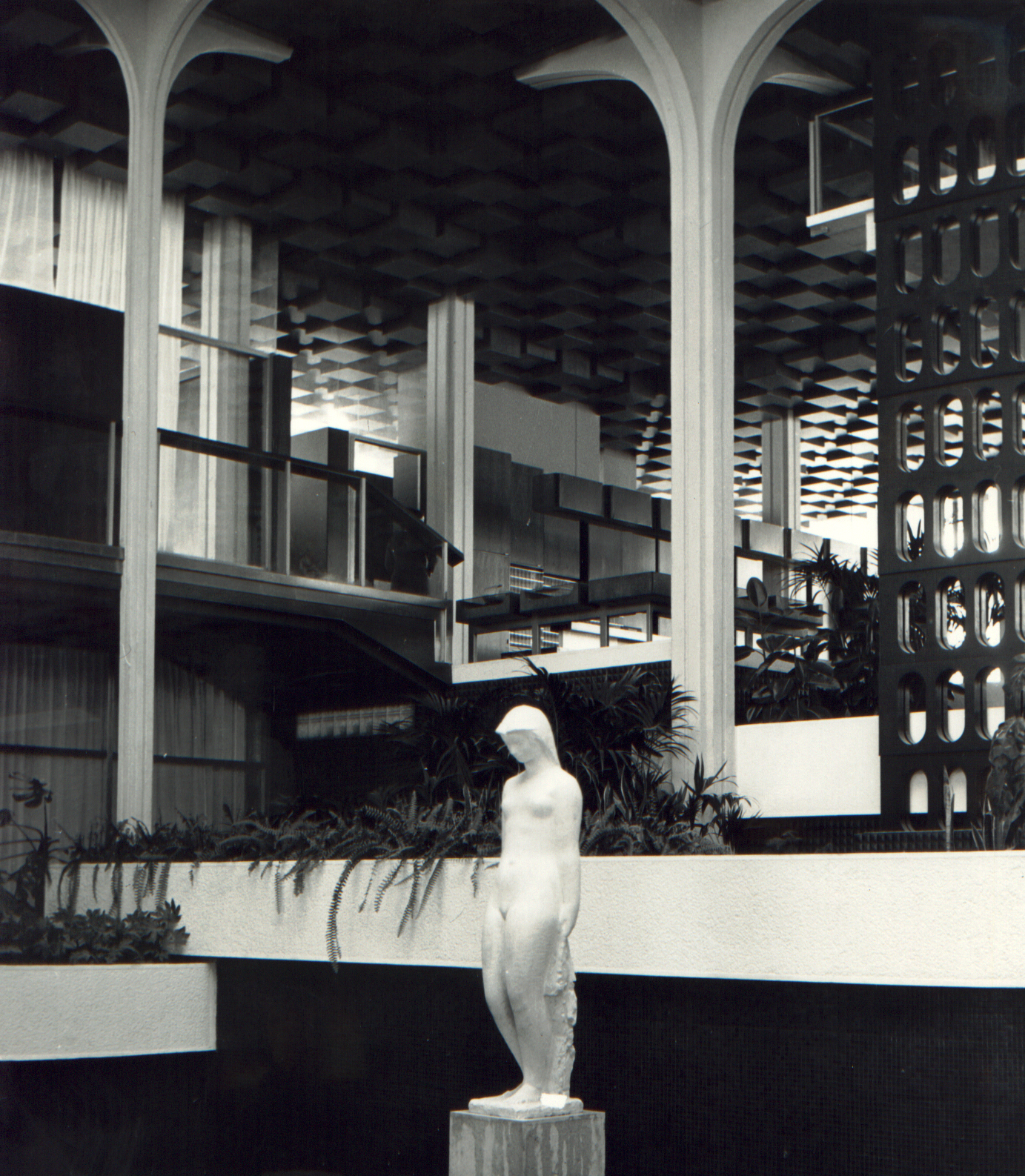
The central hall of the Palace in 1972

One of the most distinctive elements of the atrium was a system of tall, slender reinforced-concrete columns whose upper sections branched into arches. Together with large areas of glazing and roof lighting, these elements allowed the central space to remain visually open. Magaš sought to reduce the distinction between interior rooms, covered terraces and the landscape outside.

The indoor and outdoor swimming pools formed another prominent part of the composition. Their roofs incorporated large trough-shaped reinforced-concrete elements projecting above the water. Related concrete forms were repeated throughout the complex as pergolas, sun-shading structures and roof elements, creating a recurring architectural motif.

Guest rooms occupied the upper levels and adjoining accommodation pavilions. Their façades used balconies, extensive glazing and movable brise-soleil elements to regulate sunlight and create a changing rhythm across the elevations.

The Palace contained an unusually extensive range of communal facilities for the period, including restaurants and bars, banquet and conference spaces, a nightclub, casino, bowling alley, indoor and outdoor swimming pools, saunas and other recreational and service areas.

Service circulation was largely separated from guest movement. Kitchens, storage rooms and other back-of-house facilities were connected through a dedicated service system intended to supply the principal public spaces without disrupting guest circulation.

=== Accommodation and peripheral buildings ===
Groups of single-storey atrium villas extended along the slopes around the Palace. They were organised around private patios, with the principal living spaces facing the internal courtyard rather than surrounding circulation routes.

The patios were partially shaded by the same trough-shaped concrete roof form used elsewhere in Haludovo. The element provided shade while allowing air and daylight into the courtyard. The villas were originally predominantly white, with white timber shutters, and their arrangement allowed existing vegetation to extend through and between the buildings.

Although the villas provided greater privacy than the Palace, a network of pedestrian paths connected them with the central hotel, recreational facilities, coast and other accommodation areas.

Hotel Tamaris formed the south-eastern edge of the resort. Its curved plan followed the terrain and was articulated by repeating accommodation modules and loggias, producing a rhythmic façade. Designed to a lower category than the Palace, it formed part of the perimeter of the overall hotel city composition. Most of the building was demolished in the early 2000s.

A separate group of two-storey villas formed the north-eastern boundary of the complex. Their architecture repeated elements employed elsewhere at Haludovo, including white façades, shutters and projecting vertical wall elements.

The Fishermen's Village (Ribarsko selo) deliberately departed from the architectural language of the central resort. Arranged around a small coastal inlet and harbour, it used a picturesque composition of smaller buildings, passages, terraces and public spaces intended to evoke the spatial character of an Adriatic fishing settlement.

Rather than reproducing a specific historic village, the design combined recognisable features of coastal vernacular architecture into a purpose-built tourist environment. It therefore formed part of Haludovo's broader strategy of providing several distinct architectural atmospheres within a single resort.

=== Landscape and coast ===
Landscape design formed an integral part of Haludovo. Much of the existing woodland was retained and the rocky shoreline was incorporated into a system of promenades, beaches, sunbathing areas and smaller outdoor spaces.

Stone walls and curved coastal structures followed the natural form of the shore. The pedestrian routes linked the individual accommodation groups with the Palace and the coast and created a gradual transition between architecture, vegetation and the sea.

Unlike a completely enclosed resort enclave, Haludovo's coastal promenade and beaches were also used by residents of Malinska and visitors who were not staying at the resort. The relationship between commercial tourist facilities and publicly accessible coastal space subsequently became an important issue in proposals for redevelopment.

== Architectural reception and significance ==
Haludovo attracted considerable attention in Yugoslav architectural writing soon after its completion. Vanda Ekl's 1972 study emphasised the complexity of its spatial composition and the relationship between architecture, landscape and recreational functions. Magaš himself described tourist architecture as an architecture of spaces and forms intended for psychological relaxation and emphasised the continuity between interiors, terraces, vegetation and the coastal landscape.

Critical reception was not uniformly positive. Some Croatian critics regarded the Palace's monumentality, decorative expression and association with luxury tourism as a departure from the more restrained regional modernism of the preceding period. Duško Kečkemet criticised its perceived American decorative character, while Ivo Maroević later compared it unfavourably with Magaš's earlier work at Solaris. Željka Čorak criticised the social differentiation embodied in the resort's hierarchy of accommodation types.

Later scholarship has reassessed many of these qualities as historically significant. Mrduljaš and Turato interpret Haludovo's simulation of elements of a historical city, mixture of accommodation typologies and deliberately expressive forms as evidence of a shift away from orthodox modernism. The resort has consequently been described as anticipating postmodern architectural tendencies in Croatia.

At the same time, Haludovo retained fundamental modernist principles: the buildings formed parts of a comprehensive plan, pedestrian and service circulation were carefully organised, landscape was treated as a component of the architectural composition, and the complex was designed as a large integrated system rather than a collection of independent structures.

Haludovo is generally regarded as one of Magaš's major works and as one of the most significant examples of Yugoslav tourist architecture of the period.

The surviving complex is not individually listed in the Register of Cultural Goods of Croatia. Architectural and conservation studies have nevertheless argued that its most significant surviving elements, particularly the Palace, central atrium and swimming-pool complex, possess substantial architectural and heritage value and merit protection.

== Cultural legacy ==
Haludovo has become a recurring case study in scholarship on Yugoslav modernism, tourism and the post-socialist transformation of the Adriatic coast. Its history encompasses several broader themes in post-war Yugoslav society, including large-scale tourism development, socialist self-management, economic exchange with the West, public use of tourist infrastructure and the consequences of post-socialist privatisation.

The resort was the subject of the first episode of the Croatian documentary series Betonski spavači (Slumbering Concrete) in 2016. Entitled Socijalizam susreće kapitalizam ("Socialism Meets Capitalism"), the episode used archival material and interviews to examine the architecture of Haludovo, its Penthouse period and its subsequent decline.

Haludovo has also been documented in architectural exhibitions, publications and photography concerning the architecture of socialist Yugoslavia. The Palace's abandoned interiors have become particularly prominent in visual representations of post-socialist architectural decay, while academic studies have emphasised that the significance of Haludovo also derives from its original relationship between architecture, landscape, tourism and public space.

== Gallery ==
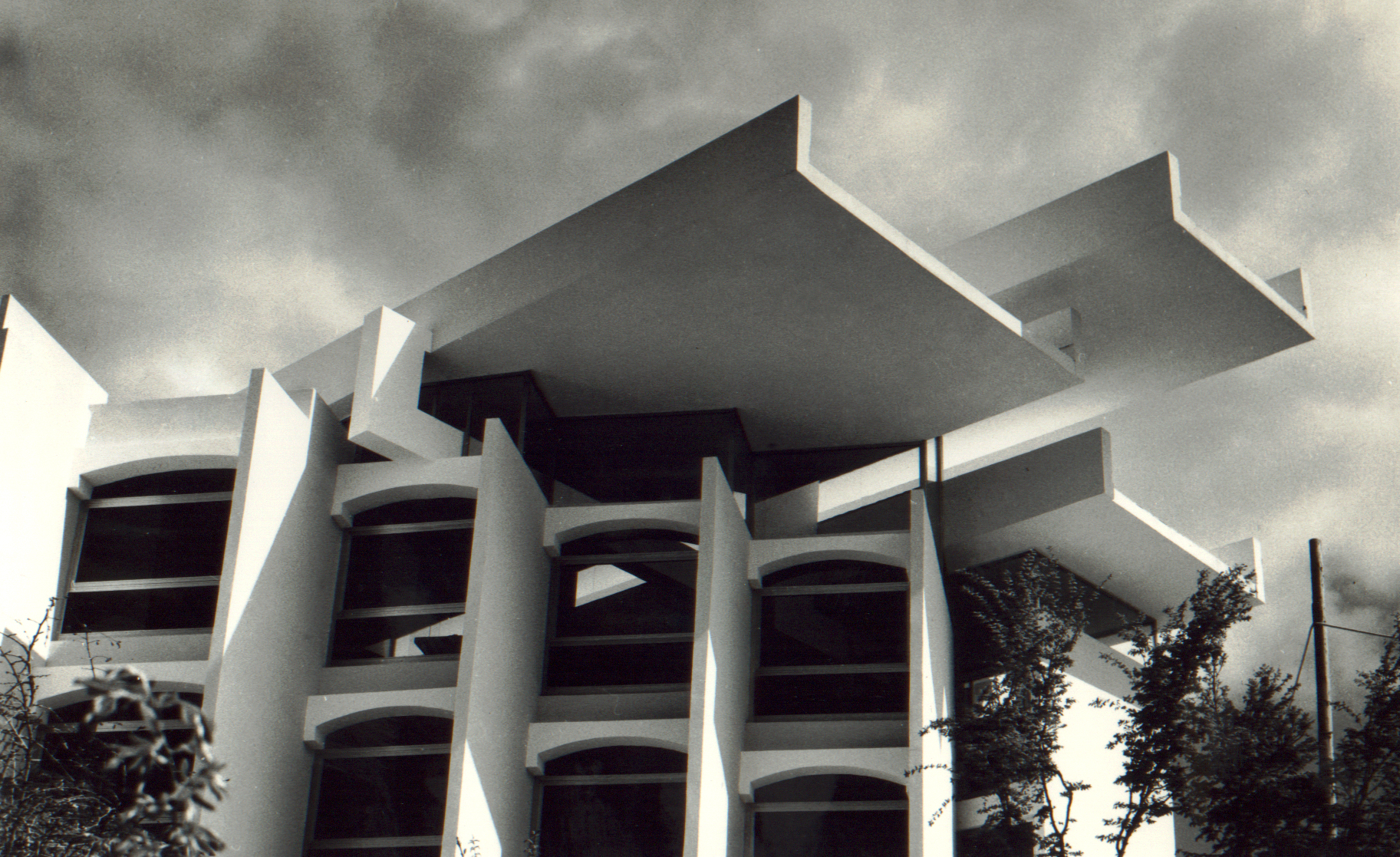
The Haludovo resort in 1972

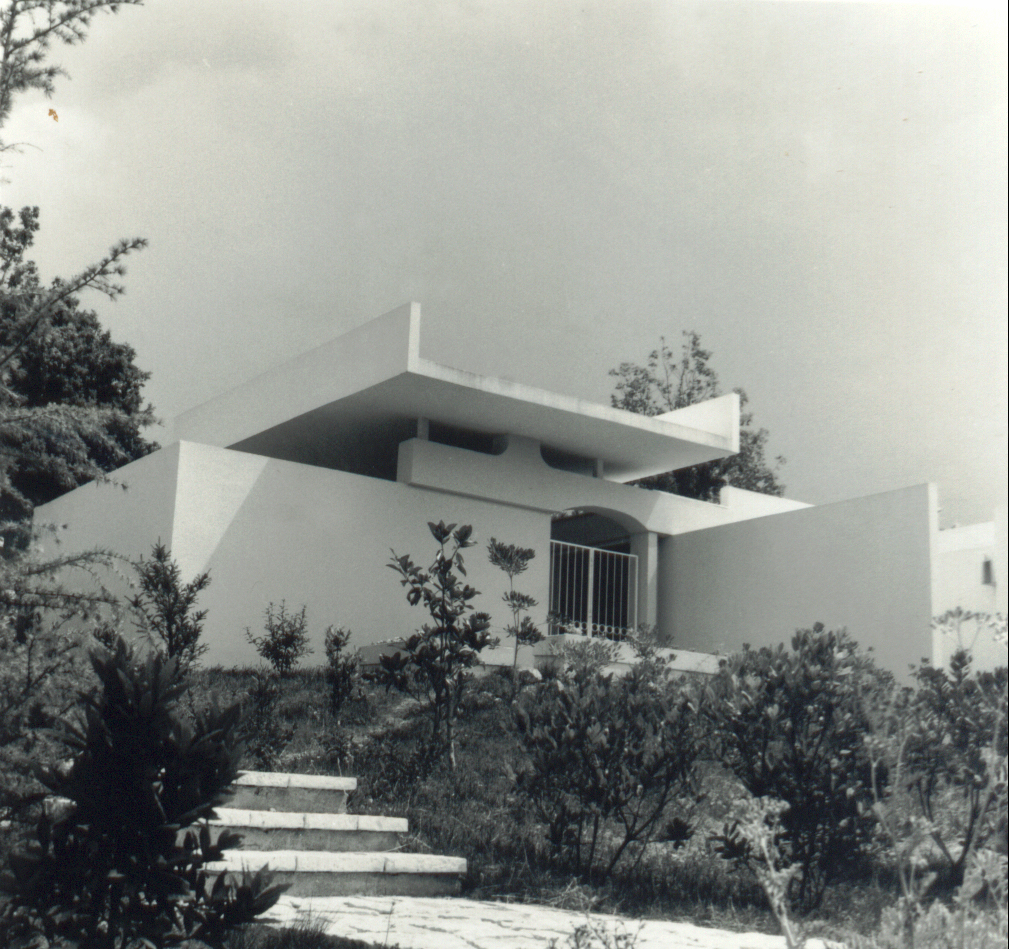
One of the original villas, 1972

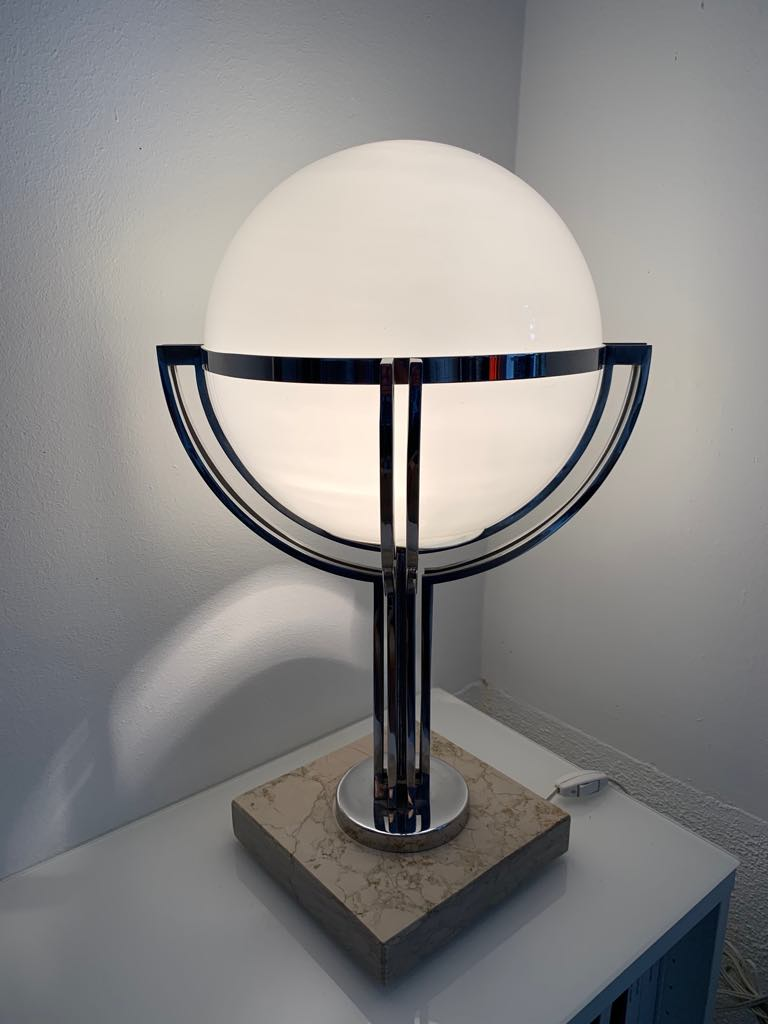
Interior lighting design in the Palace, 1972

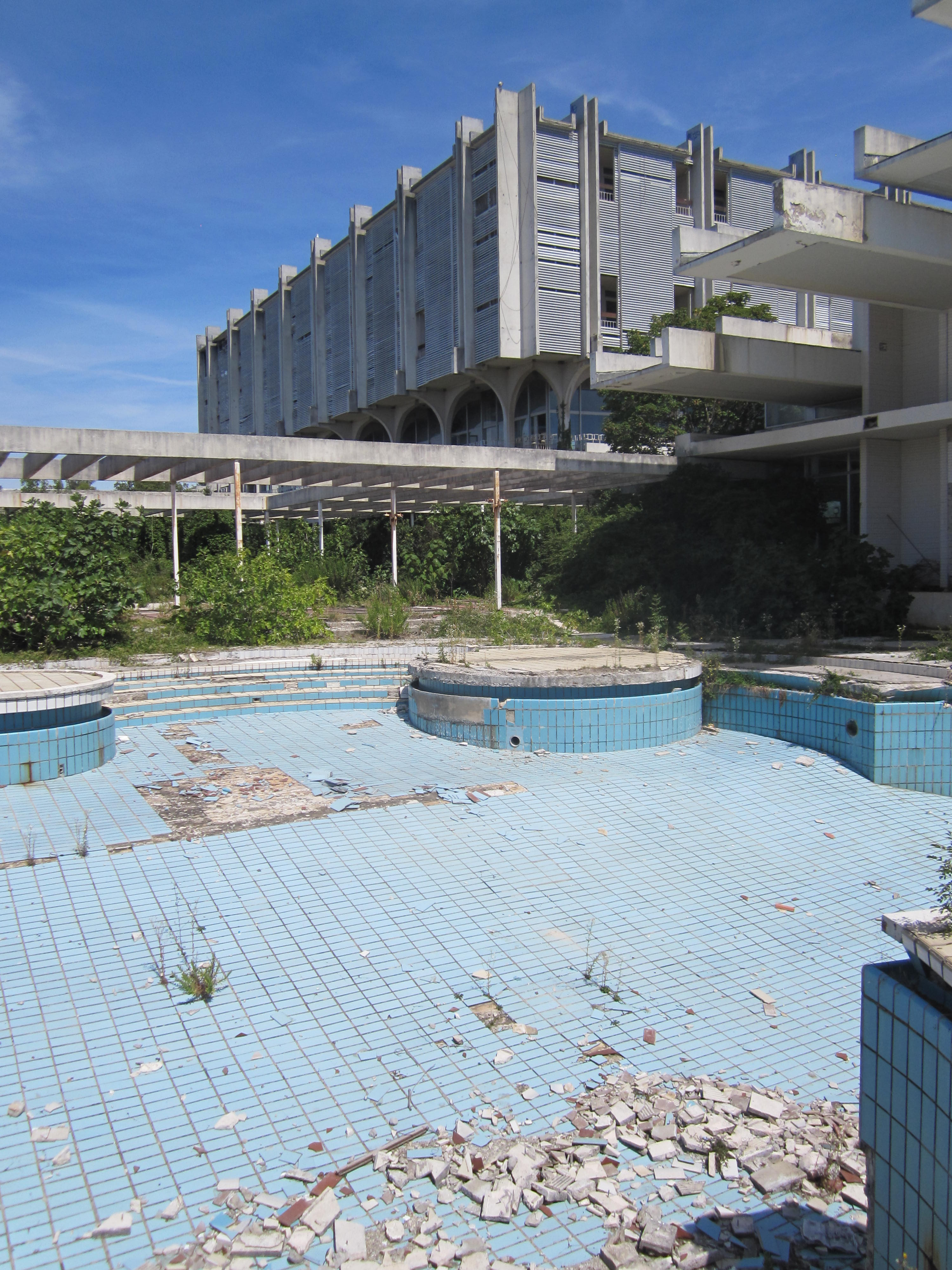
The abandoned Palace seen from the former pool area in 2011

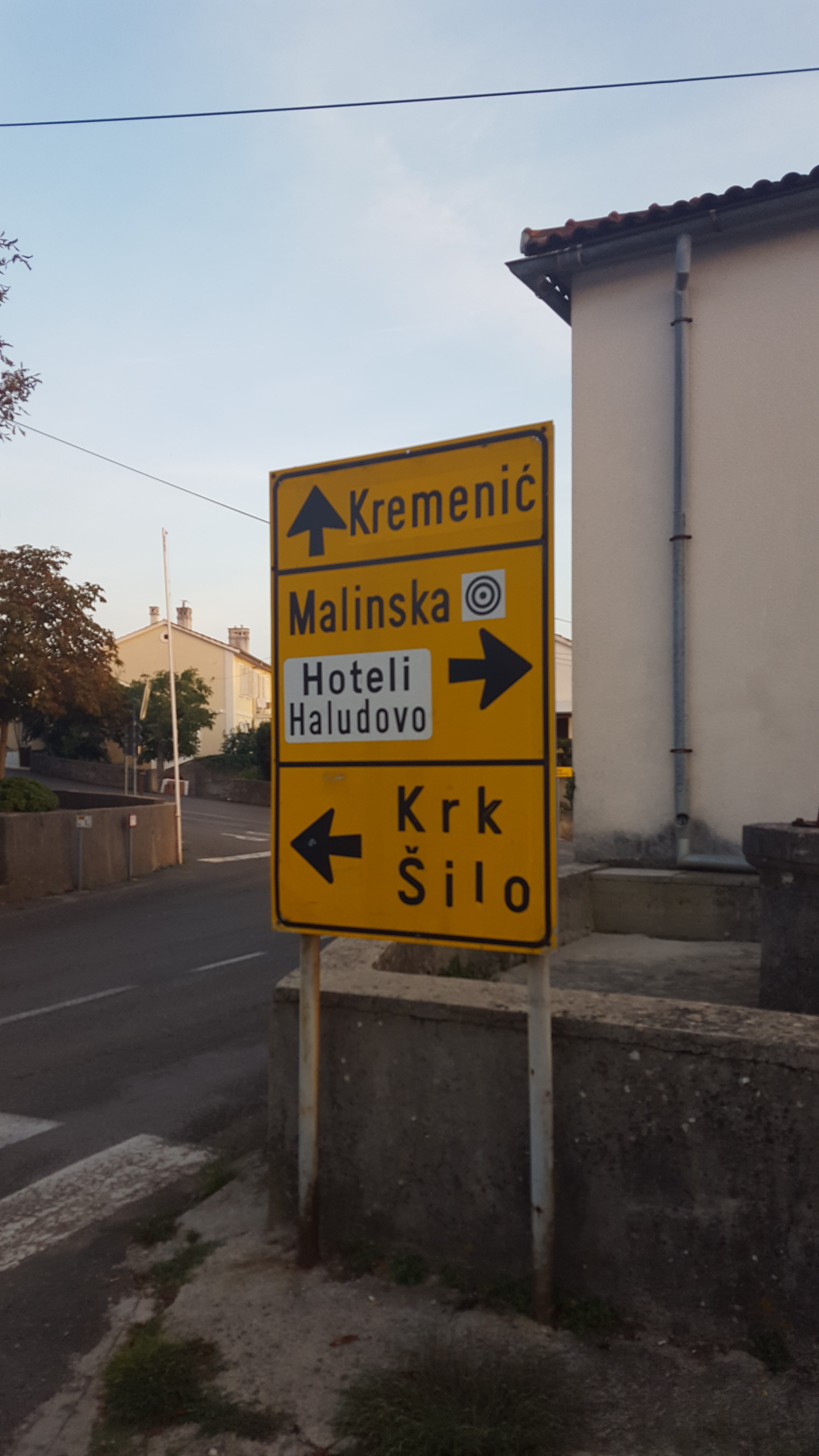
Road sign pointing towards Haludovo in 2018

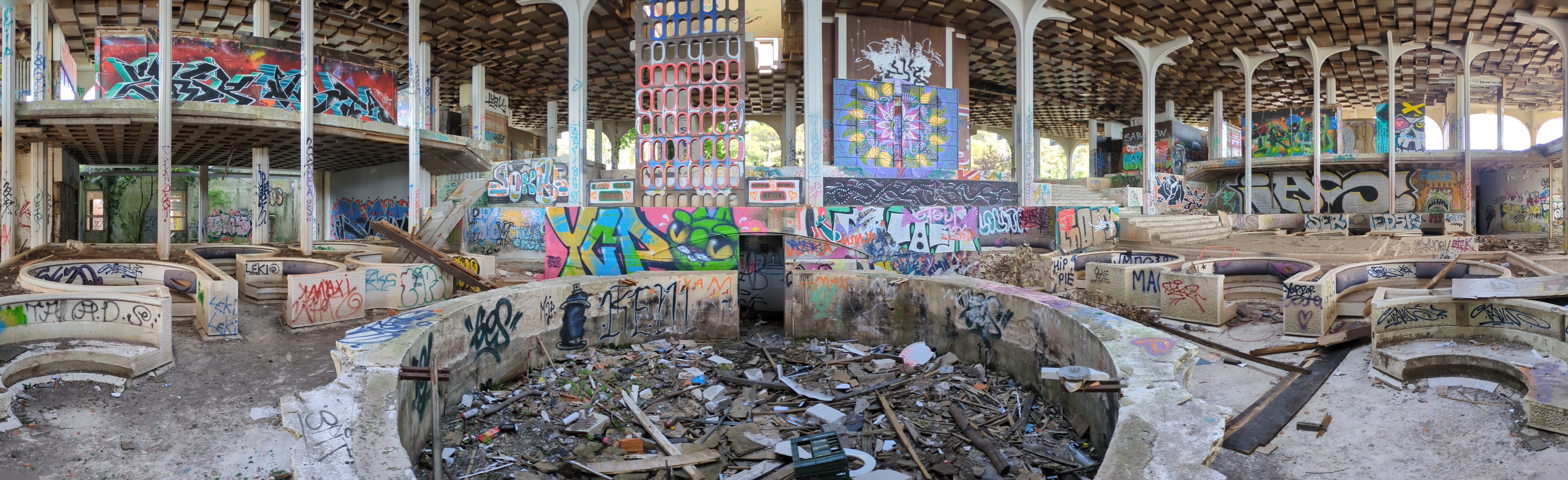
The derelict Palace lobby in 2025

== See also ==
- Boris Magaš
- Architecture of Yugoslavia
- Modern architecture
- Postmodern architecture
