= Historical Museum of Bosnia and Herzegovina =

Museum in Sarajevo

Coordinates: 43°51′18″N 18°24′16″E

- Historijski muzej Bosne i Hercegovine
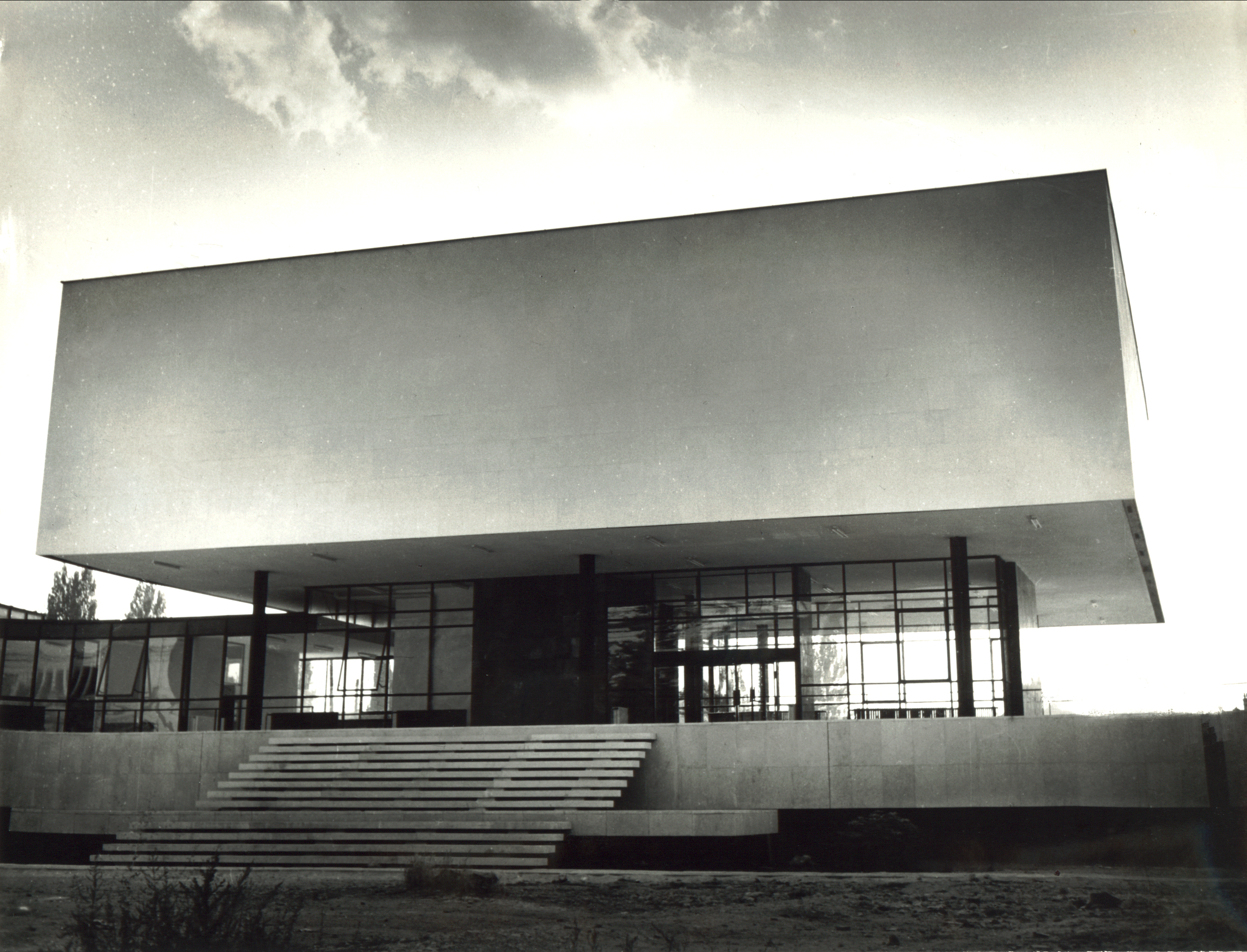
- Former name: Museum of the Revolution of Bosnia and Herzegovina
- Established: 13 November 1945; 80 years ago
- Location: Zmaja od Bosne 5, 71 000, Sarajevo, Bosnia and Herzegovina
- Collection size: >400,000
- Website: muzej.ba

The Historical Museum of Bosnia and Herzegovina (Bosnian: Historijski muzej Bosne i Hercegovine) is a museum in Sarajevo, Bosnia and Herzegovina, dedicated to the history of Bosnia and Herzegovina, and Sarajevo from the Middle Ages to the present day. The museum was founded in 1945.

== History ==
The museum was founded on 13 November 1945 as the Museum of the Liberation of Sarajevo. The museum has had several names during its life, adopting the name Museum of National Revolution of Bosnia and Herzegovina in 1949, before changing to Museum of Revolution of Bosnia and Herzegovina in 1963. It adopted the current name of Historical Museum of Bosnia and Herzegovina in 1993. The museum moved into its current, purpose built building at Zmaja od Bosne 5 street in 1963.

=== Building ===
The building was designed by Boris Magaš, Radovan Horvat, and Edo Šmidihen. It was the architect's Boris Magaš first notable work. The design received the National Award "Viktor Kovačić" in 1963. The design is an abstract composition of simple, clean forms. The solid, protruding cubic volume of the upper floor appears to float above the transparent glass and metal supporting structure. On November 8, 2012, the building was officially declared a National Monument of Bosnia and Herzegovina. In 2018 the Getty Foundation awarded a grant for the conservation of the building as part of its "Keeping it Modern" initiative.

The building was damaged by shelling during the Siege of Sarajevo in 1994.

== Collections ==
The museum holds more than 400,000 historical artifacts, with the largest part of the collection referring to the Second World War and the struggle for liberation from fascism. Prior to 1993, the museum's sole focus was the War period, however upon changing name, the museum started to cover the country's history more broadly. Now, the collection holds items covering a number of time periods, with permanent exhibitions looking at the Yugoslav Wars and a photographic history of Sarajevo.

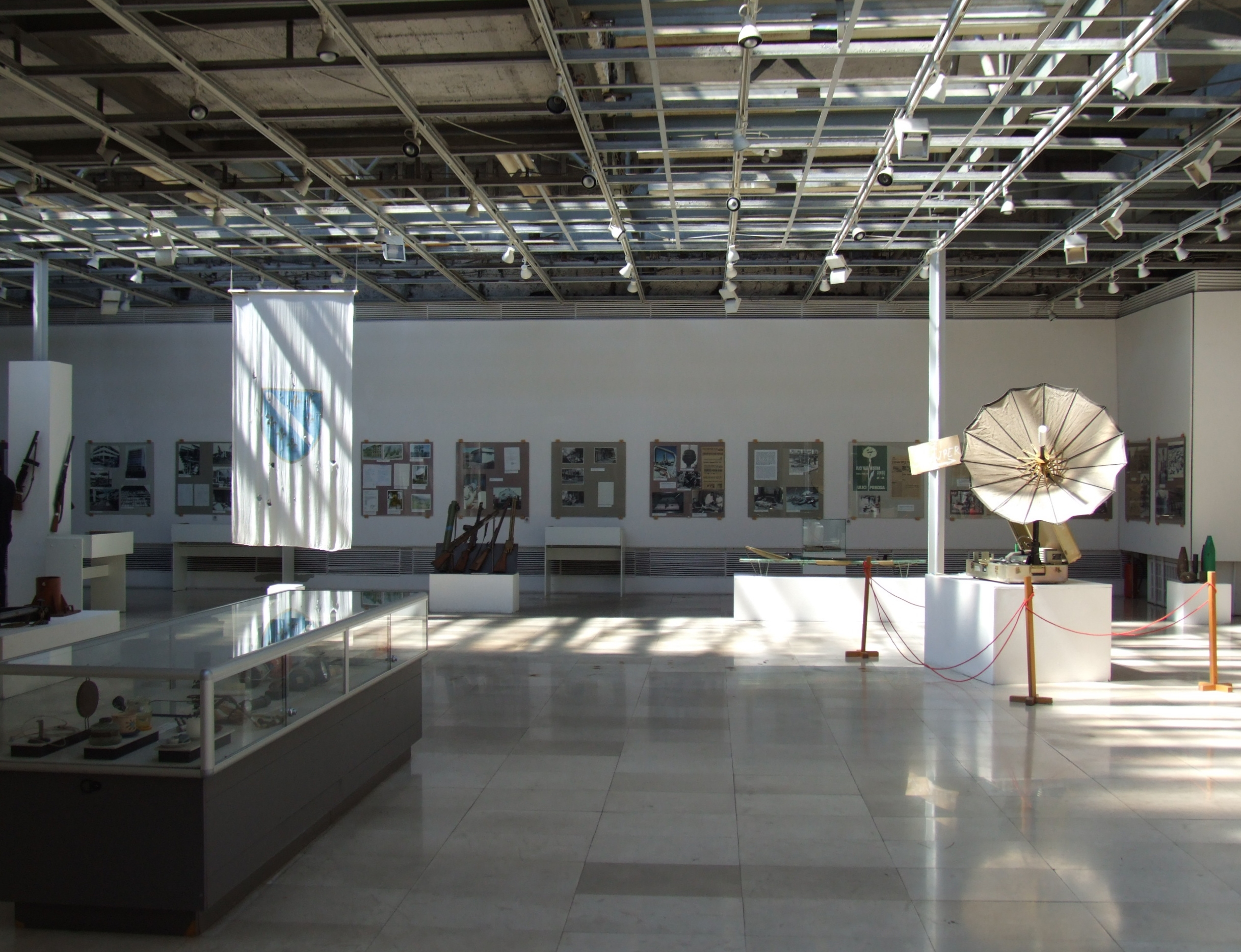
The interior in 2012

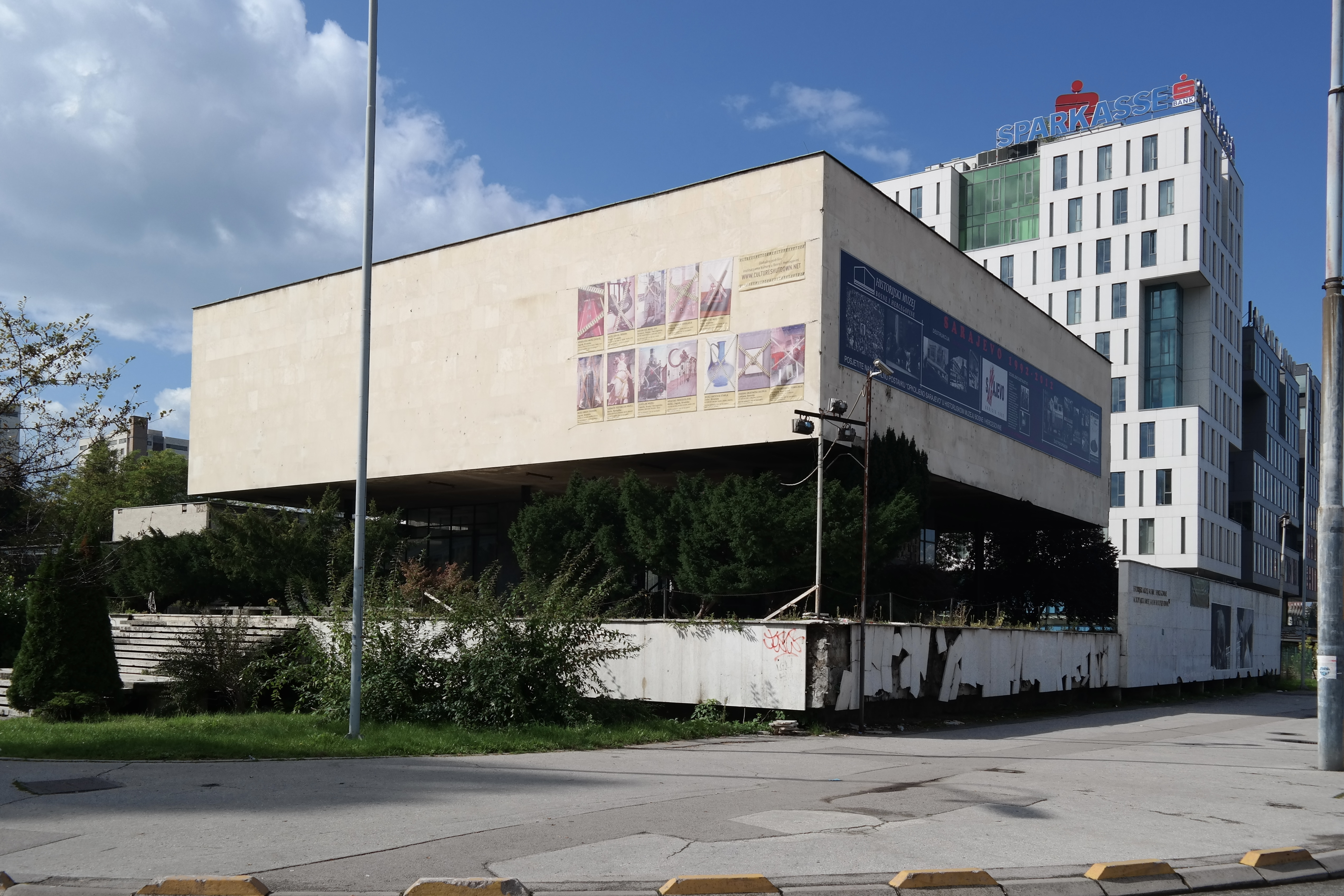
The building in 2014

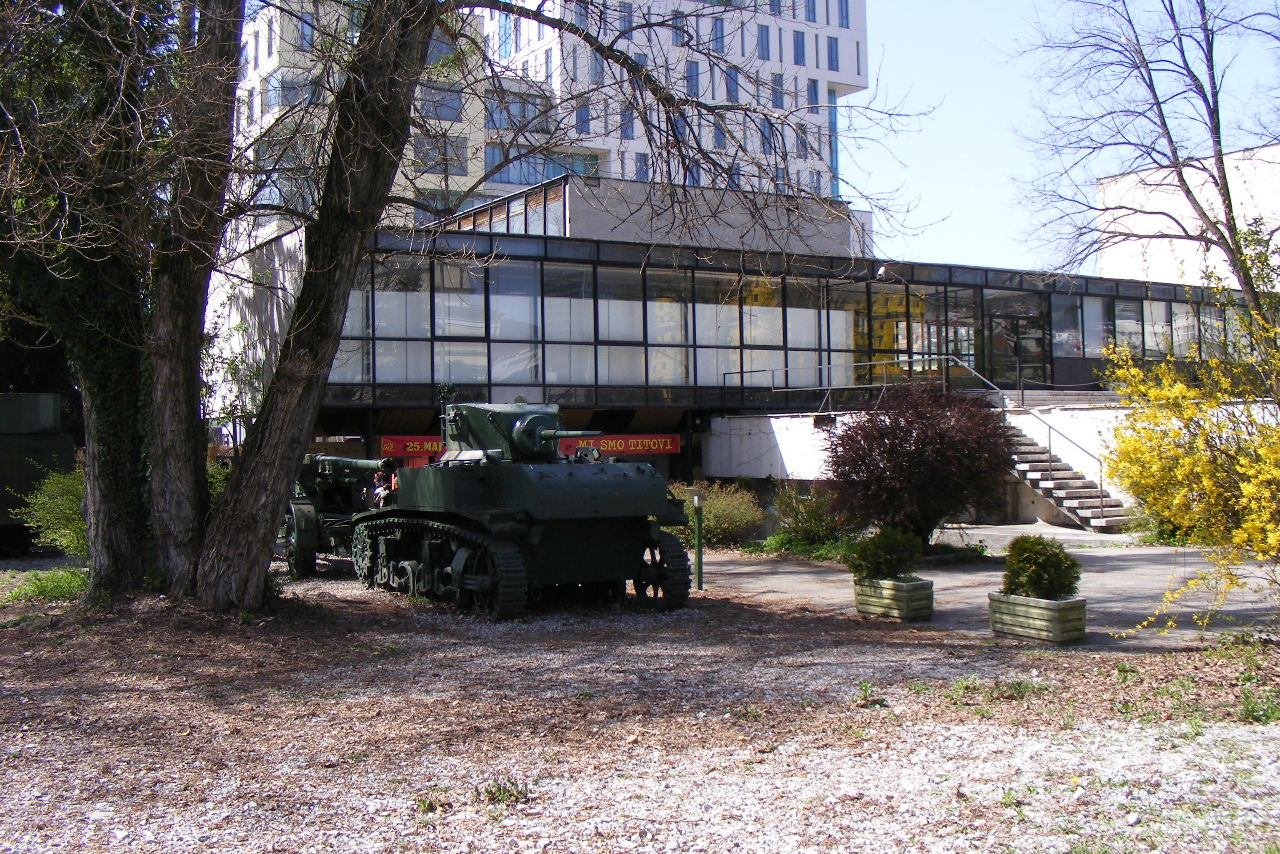
Museum garden with old military equipment

== See also ==
- List of museums in Bosnia and Herzegovina
- Museums in Sarajevo
