= Stadion Poljud =

Stadium in Croatia

- "The Poljud beauty" (Croatian: Poljudska ljepotica)
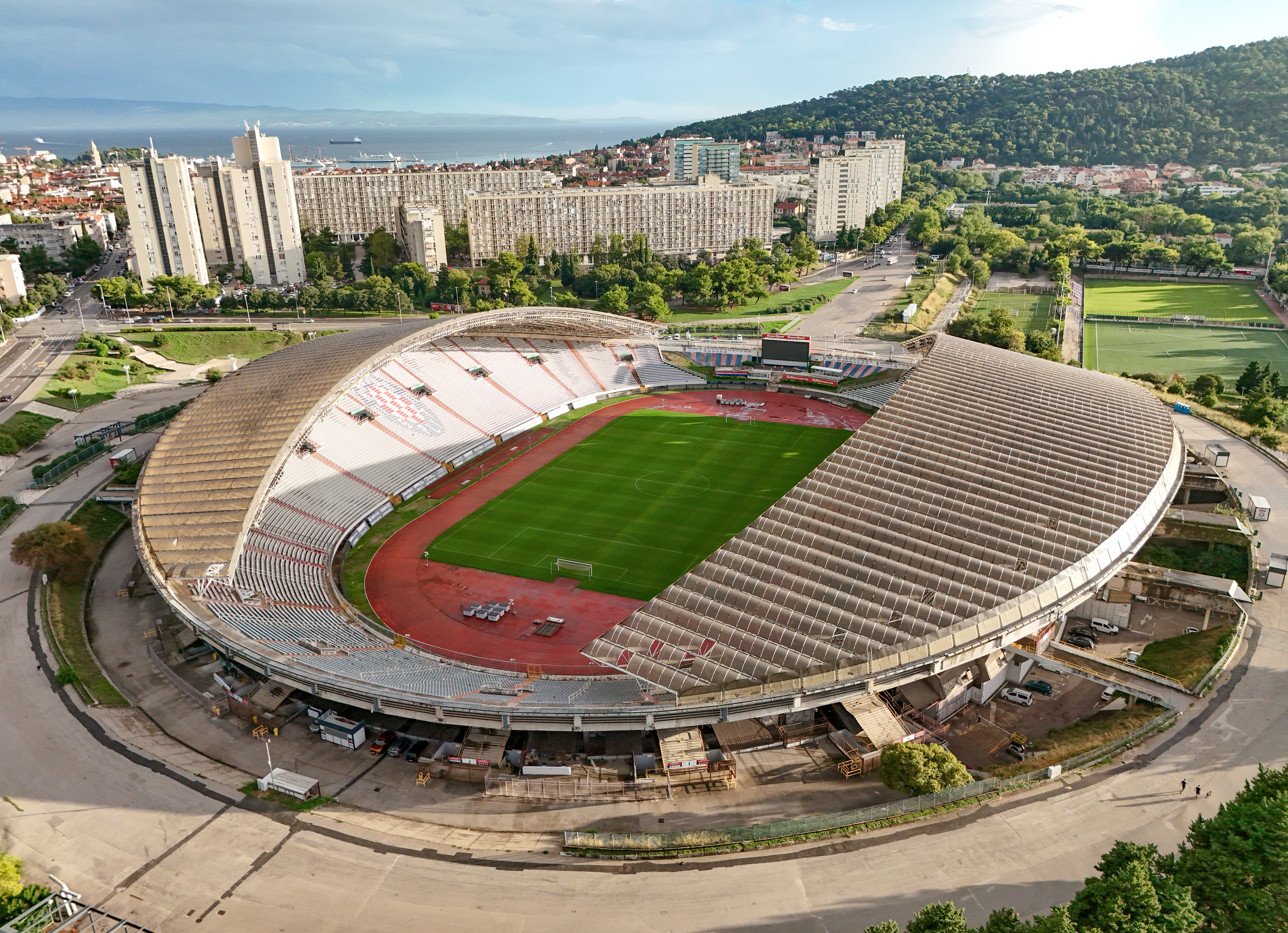
- Panoramic view of the stadium in 2024
- Interactive map of Stadion Poljud
- Full name: Gradski stadion u Poljudu
- Location: Spinut, Split, Croatia
- Coordinates: 43°31′10″N 16°25′54″E
- Owner: City of Split
- Operator: Hajduk Split
- Capacity: 33,987
- Surface: Grass
- Field size: 105 m × 68 m (115 yd × 74 yd)

Construction
- Built: 1977–1979
- Opened: 12 September 1979; 47 years ago
- Architect: Boris Magaš
- Structural engineer: Boženko Jelić

Tenants
- Hajduk Split (1979–present); ŽNK Hajduk (selected matches); Croatia national football team (selected matches); Ultra Europe (2013–2018)

Cultural Good of Croatia
- Type: Protected cultural good
- Reference no.: Z-6644

Gradski stadion u Poljudu (English: City Stadium in Poljud), better known as Stadion Poljud (English: Poljud Stadium) or simply Poljud, is a multi-use stadium in Split, Croatia, which has been the home ground of Hajduk Split football club since 1979. The stadium is located in the neighbourhood of Poljud, which belongs to city district of Spinut. It was opened in September 1979, and has a seating capacity of 33,987.

It had an original capacity of 55,000, increased to 62,000 in the 1980s, before being equipped with seats in the 1990s, thus reducing the capacity to 33,987.

Poljud Stadium was the venue for the 1990 European Athletics Championships and 2010 IAAF Continental Cup. Electronic music festival Ultra Europe, an expansion of the Ultra Music Festival, was held at Stadium Poljud from 2013 until 2019 when it moved to Park Mladeži. The city of Split holds the multi-day festival annually, drawing more than 150,000 people each year.

== Design ==
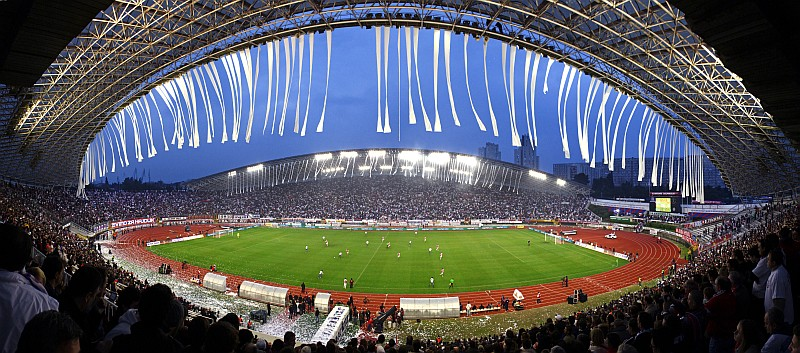
Poljud Stadium during the celebration of Hajduk Split's 100th birthday

The author of the winning project in the original 1975 competition for the Split stadium was architect Ivan Piteša. He designed a fully covered, shell-shaped stadium without an athletics track, drawing his main inspiration from the Parc des Princes in Paris. Despite winning first place, the project was taken from him under controversial circumstances and awarded to Boris Magaš. In that same competition, Magaš's original proposal, which bore no resemblance to the stadium built today, had only placed third.

The seashell-like design by Croatian architect Boris Magaš has a roof structure spanning at 206×47 meters. Its design offers views of nearby hills and forests from the stands, modelled after ancient Greek theaters. Suspended on the west roof "shell" are 19 cabins. Seven of them are used by TV reporters, with the others occupied by cameras, central referee station, photo finish, scoreboard, and audio control. They are all interconnected via a catwalk that runs through a structure spanning the entire roof giving access to the cabins, as well as to the 630 Philips lights, placed along the brim and inner side of the roof.

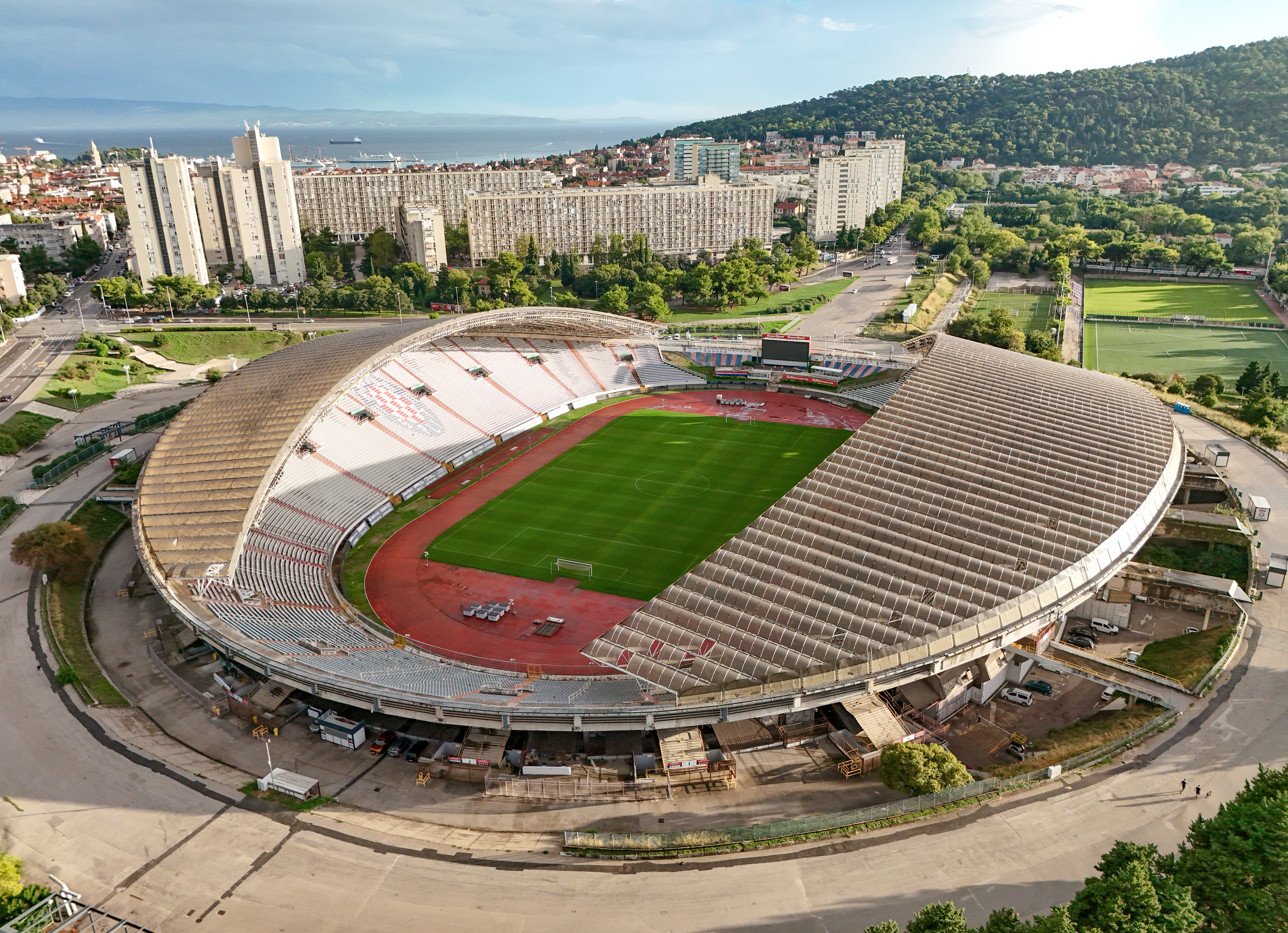
Exterior in 2024

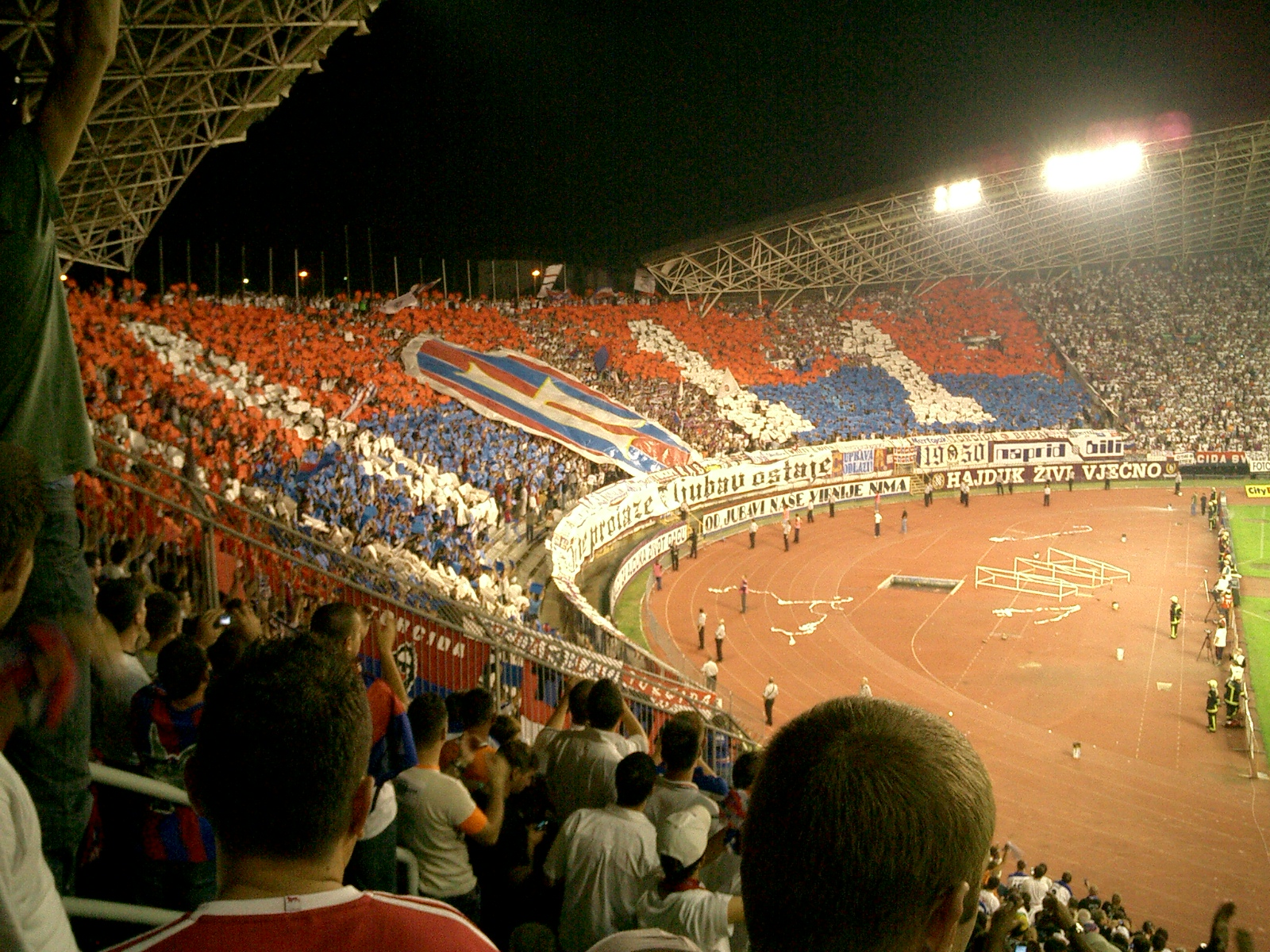
Northern stand

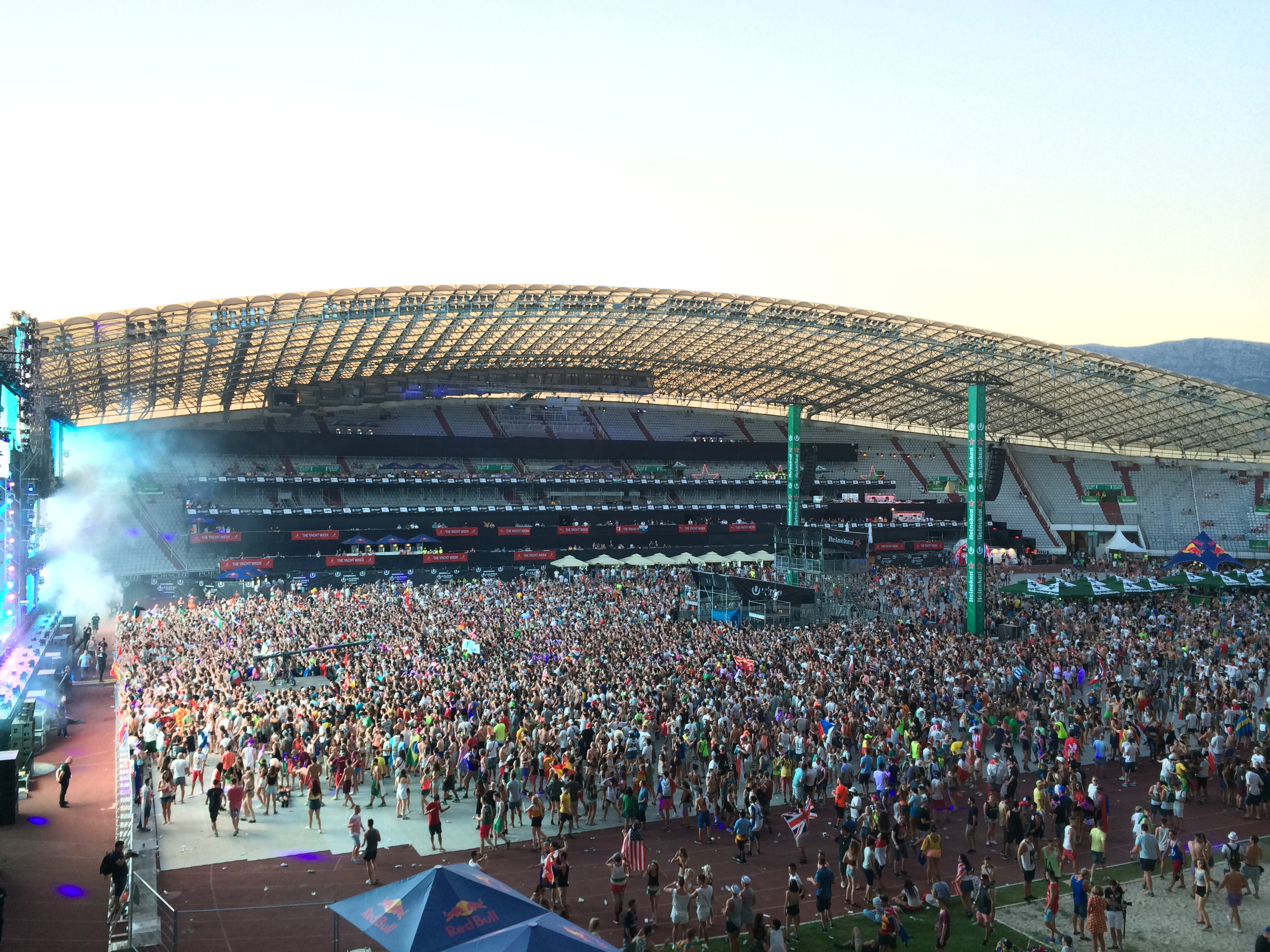
Ultra Europe at Poljud Stadium

Stands are supported by a construction of reinforced concrete with entrances via 12 bridges placed 30–40 meters apart around the entire stadium as well as eight staircases. Underneath them is a trench holding office areas. The area around the stadium is composed of 60,000 square meters of designed landscape with greenery designated for pedestrians, with the stadium slightly beneath the grade level of surrounding roads. Under the western stands are 11,000 square meters of sports facilities (three gyms, pool, sauna), official club offices and restaurants, while the eastern stands cover 9,100 square meters of business areas. The inner stadium ground is composed of a 105x68 meters football pitch and eight running tracks surrounding it.

The stadium was refurbished before hosting the 2010 IAAF Continental Cup athletics competition. A new tartan track was constructed, including the introduction of new VIP boxes and seats. In October 2014, following heavy damage from Ultra Europe, a new pitch and drainage system were constructed, replacing the original ones that lasted for 35 years.

In November 2015 the stadium was officially recognized as culture heritage.

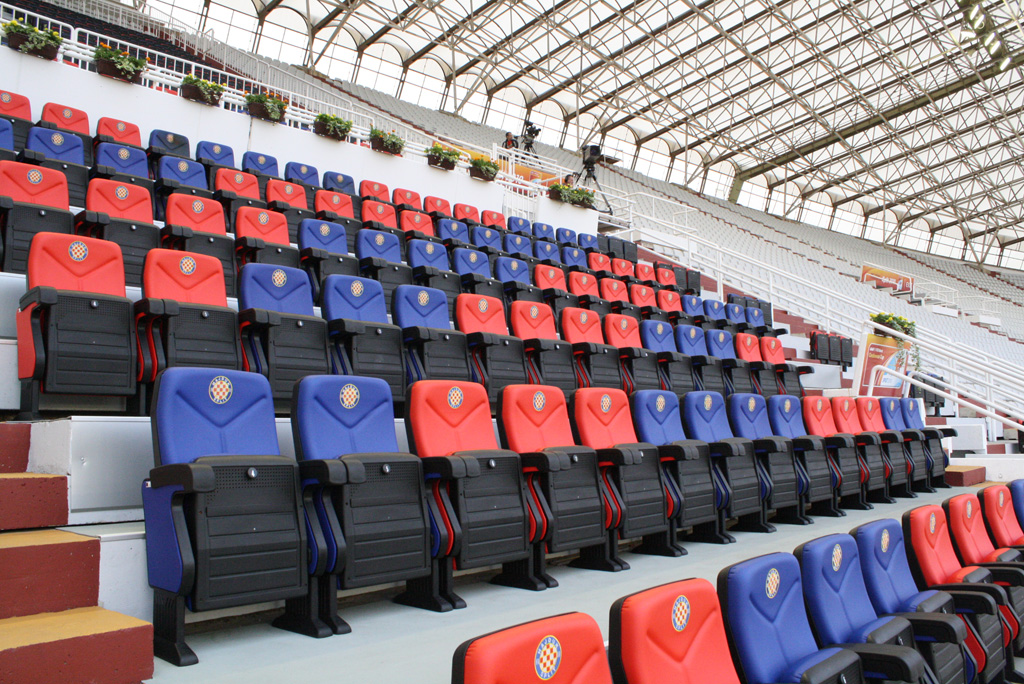
VIP stands

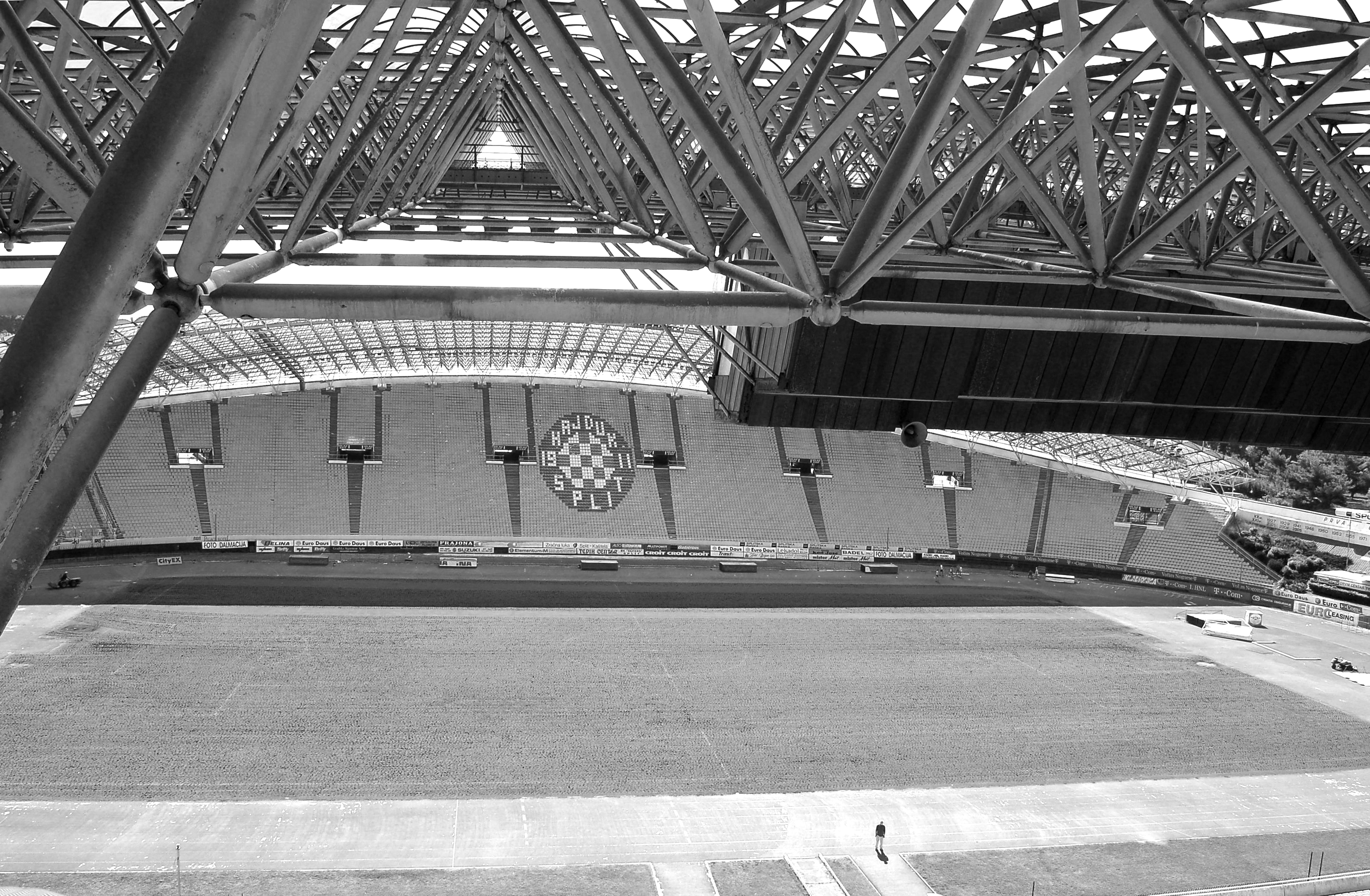
Poljud Stadium, showing the Mero roof structure and the figure of stadium architect Boris Magaš at the bottom right

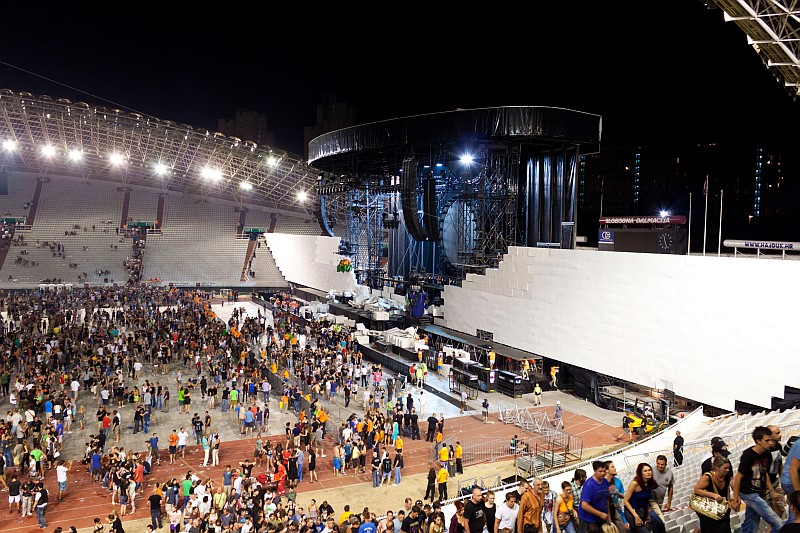
Roger Waters on his The Wall Live Tour in 2013

== Renovation ==
In October 2024, it was announced that the Poljud Stadium would undergo reconstruction. The roof of the stadium will be adapted, along with its reinforced concrete structure and electrical installations. The Split stadium will also receive a new video and audio system, as well as updated fire protection measures. The Government of Croatia has approved funds for all the necessary project documentation. Work on the stadium was expected to begin in the spring of 2025, at the end of the current competitive season. The funds have been secured, and the project will be implemented in several stages.

The first section to be renovated includes the southwest stand, where the visiting fans will be seated, and part of the west stand extending toward the south. In the second phase, reconstruction is planned for the southeast stand and part of the east stand extending southward, followed by the sections to the north. The plan initially involved using alpinists; however, scaffolding will still need to be utilized. The chairs will remain in place, and the entire concrete structure will be renovated. While the work is ongoing, some parts of Poljud will be closed, but Hajduk will still be able to play at the stadium.

== International fixtures ==
Date	Competition	Opponent	Score	Att.	Ref
Yugoslavia (1979–1991)
29 September 1979	1979 Mediterranean Games	France B	3–0	50,000	
29 April 1981	1982 FIFA World Cup qualification	Greece	5–1	45,000	
21 December 1983	UEFA Euro 1984 qualifying	Bulgaria	3–2	29,331	
29 October 1986	UEFA Euro 1988 qualifying	Turkey	4–0	12,270	
31 March 1988	Friendly	Italy	1–1	12,000	
Croatia (1991–present)
8 October 1995	UEFA Euro 1996 qualifying	Italy	1–1	35,000	
29 March 1997	1998 FIFA World Cup qualification	Denmark	1–1	35,000	
2 April 1997	1998 FIFA World Cup qualification	Slovenia	3–3	20,000	
10 February 1999	Friendly	Denmark	0–1	7,000	
23 February 2000	Friendly	Spain	0–0	10,000	
12 February 2003	2003 Marjan Trophy	Poland	0–0	1,000	
18 February 2004	Friendly	Germany	1–2	9,212	
17 August 2005	Friendly	Brazil	1–1	27,256	
6 February 2008	Friendly	Netherlands	0–3	30,000	
4 June 2011	UEFA Euro 2012 qualifying	Georgia	2–1	28,000	
15 August 2012	Friendly	Switzerland	2–4	10,000	
12 June 2015	UEFA Euro 2016 qualifying	Italy	1–1	0	
10 October 2019	UEFA Euro 2020 qualifying	Hungary	3–0	32,110	
17 November 2020	2020–21 UEFA Nations League	Portugal	2–3	0	
7 September 2021	2022 FIFA World Cup qualification	Slovenia	3–0	16,237	
14 November 2021	2022 FIFA World Cup qualification	Russia	1–0	30,257	
6 June 2022	2022–23 UEFA Nations League	France	1–1	30,000	
25 March 2023	UEFA Euro 2024 qualifying	Wales	1–1	33,474	
18 November 2024	2024–25 UEFA Nations League	Portugal	1–1	33,386	
20 March 2025	2024–25 UEFA Nations League quarter-finals	France	2–0	30,551	
6 October 2026	2026–27 UEFA Nations League	Spain	1–2	32,690	

== Events ==
This is a list of events, concerts and other public gatherings at Poljud Stadium.

Date	Headlining artist	Concert or tour	Attendance
28 September 1985	Various performers	Omladinski mirodrom	50,000
25 September 1993	Mišo Kovač	Noć Svijeća	50,000
15 September 2002	Marko Perković Thompson	E, moj narode	40,000
03 September 2006	Various performers	Ne damo te pismo naša	15,000
09 September 2007	Various performers	Ne damo te pismo naša	30,000
10 August 2008	Iron Maiden	Somewhere Back in Time World Tour	30,000
31 August 2008	Vinko Coce i prijatelji	Ne damo te pismo naša	30,000
21 September 2010	Various performers	Ne damo te pismo naša	30,000
30 June 2013	Marko Perković Thompson	Ora et Labora	50,000
12 July 2013	Ultra Europe	Electronic music festival	103,000
13 July 2013	Ultra Europe	Electronic music festival	103,000
23 July 2013	Roger Waters	The Wall Live	50,000
11 July 2014	Ultra Europe	Electronic music festival	150,000
12 July 2014	Ultra Europe	Electronic music festival	150,000
13 July 2014	Ultra Europe	Electronic music festival	150,000
10 July 2015	Ultra Europe	Electronic music festival	160,000
11 July 2015	Ultra Europe	Electronic music festival	160,000
12 July 2015	Ultra Europe	Electronic music festival	160,000
15 July 2016	Ultra Europe	Electronic music festival	150,000
16 July 2016	Ultra Europe	Electronic music festival	150,000
17 July 2016	Ultra Europe	Electronic music festival	150,000
14 July 2017	Ultra Europe	Electronic music festival	120,000
15 July 2017	Ultra Europe	Electronic music festival	120,000
16 July 2017	Ultra Europe	Electronic music festival	120,000
06 July 2018	Ultra Europe	Electronic music festival	150,000
07 July 2018	Ultra Europe	Electronic music festival	150,000
08 July 2018	Ultra Europe	Electronic music festival	150,000
09 June 2019	Various performers	To je moja zemlja	50,000

Preceded by Neckarstadion; Stuttgart	European Athletics Championships; Main Venue; 1990	Succeeded by Helsingin olympiastadion Helsinki
