= Boris Magaš =

Croatian architect

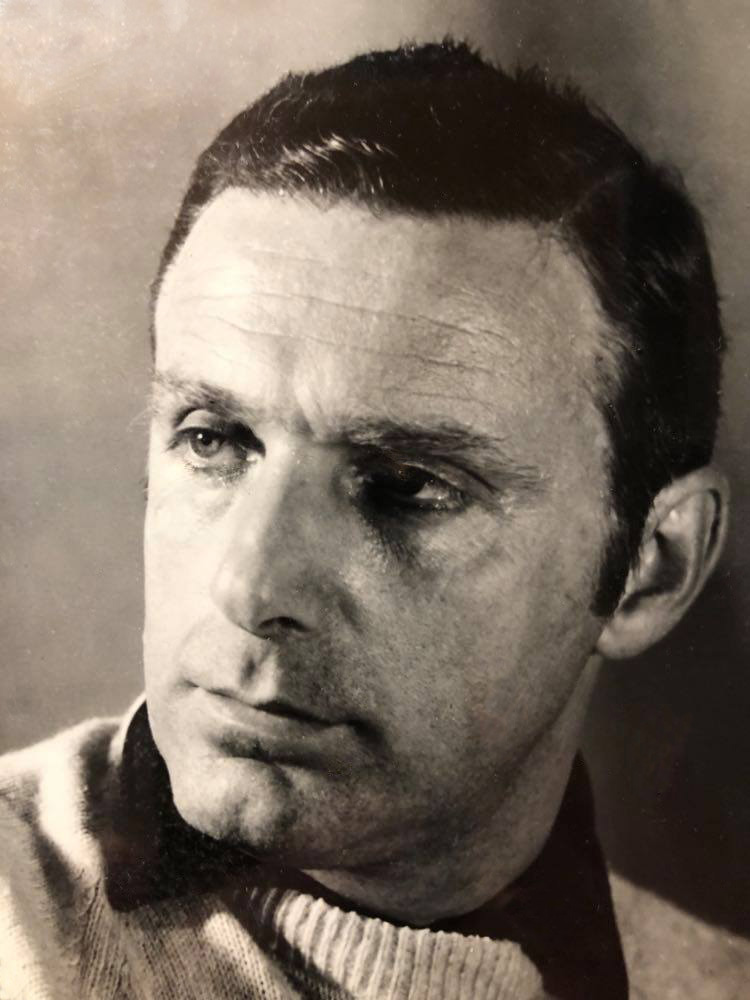
- Born: August 22, 1930
- Died: October 24, 2013
- Occupation: Architect
- Children: Michela Magas
- Awards: Order of Danica Hrvatska (1997)
- Website: borismagas.com

Boris Magaš (Karlovac, August 22, 1930 – Rijeka, October 24, 2013) was a Croatian architect and architectural theorist, former Secretary of the Croatian Academy of Sciences and Arts and recipient of the Croatian National order of chivalry Order of Danica Hrvatska "Marko Marulić" for culture. He is best known for the Poljud stadium in Split and the Historical Museum of Bosnia and Herzegovina in Sarajevo.

His daughter is the designer and entrepreneur, Michela Magas.

== Academic and professional career ==
Boris Magaš graduated in 1955 from the Department of Architecture at the Technical Faculty of the University of Zagreb. He was Assistant at the Department of Architectural Design from 1956 to 1961, and at the Department of Theory of Architecture from 1961 to 1966. He was the Project Group Leader of the Architectural Office "Interinženjering" in Zagreb from 1967 to 1969, and the Design Director of the Construction Design Institute in Rijeka from 1969 to 1978. He was elected Associate Professor in the course "Elements of Building Construction" at the Technical Faculty of the University of Rijeka in 1974. He defended his doctorate in architecture and urbanism in 1977. In 1978 he was elected Associate Professor, and in 1980 as a Full Professor of "Elements of Building Construction" and "Building"at the Faculty of Civil Engineering in Rijeka. He was elected Full Professor of "Theory of Architecture" and "Architectural Design VIII and IX" at the Faculty of Architecture, University of Zagreb in 1983, Buildings for Culture (1984–87), Buildings for Tourism and Leisure (1984–94), Design VIII (1983-90), Design IX / Final / Integral thesis (1983–90), Graduation thesis (1985–95), He was President of the Graduate Committee (1986–89) and Head of the Department of History and Theory of Architecture (1986–92). He was elected Professor Emeritus of the University of Zagreb in 2001.

== Policy advisory and public office ==
He was elected Associate Member of the Yugoslav Academy of Sciences and Arts in 1988 and full member of the Croatian Academy of Sciences and Arts in 1991. He was an Advisor for Architecture and Urbanism to the President of the Republic of Croatia in 1991-1992. He was elected Member of the Presidency of the Croatian Academy of Sciences and Arts in 2004, Secretary of the Department of Fine Arts of the Croatian Academy of Sciences and Arts in 2011, and member of the Council for Architecture and Planning Of the Republic of Croatia in 2008.

He has been a scientific advisor since 1981. He is the main researcher on the scientific project "Development of the theory of architecture in the Croatian ethnic area" 1991-1994 and associate on the scientific project "Analysis of architectural and spatial models in tourism in Croatia". He worked in the Arts Council of the Association of Architects of Yugoslavia and the Croatian Association of Architects (CAA), the Board of the Society of Architects of Zagreb, the Commission for International Relations of the CAA, the Court of Honour of the CAA, the editorial board of the magazine "Architecture", on the Commission of the Regional Institute for Cultural Monuments, and on the Commission for Social Security.

== Architectural works ==
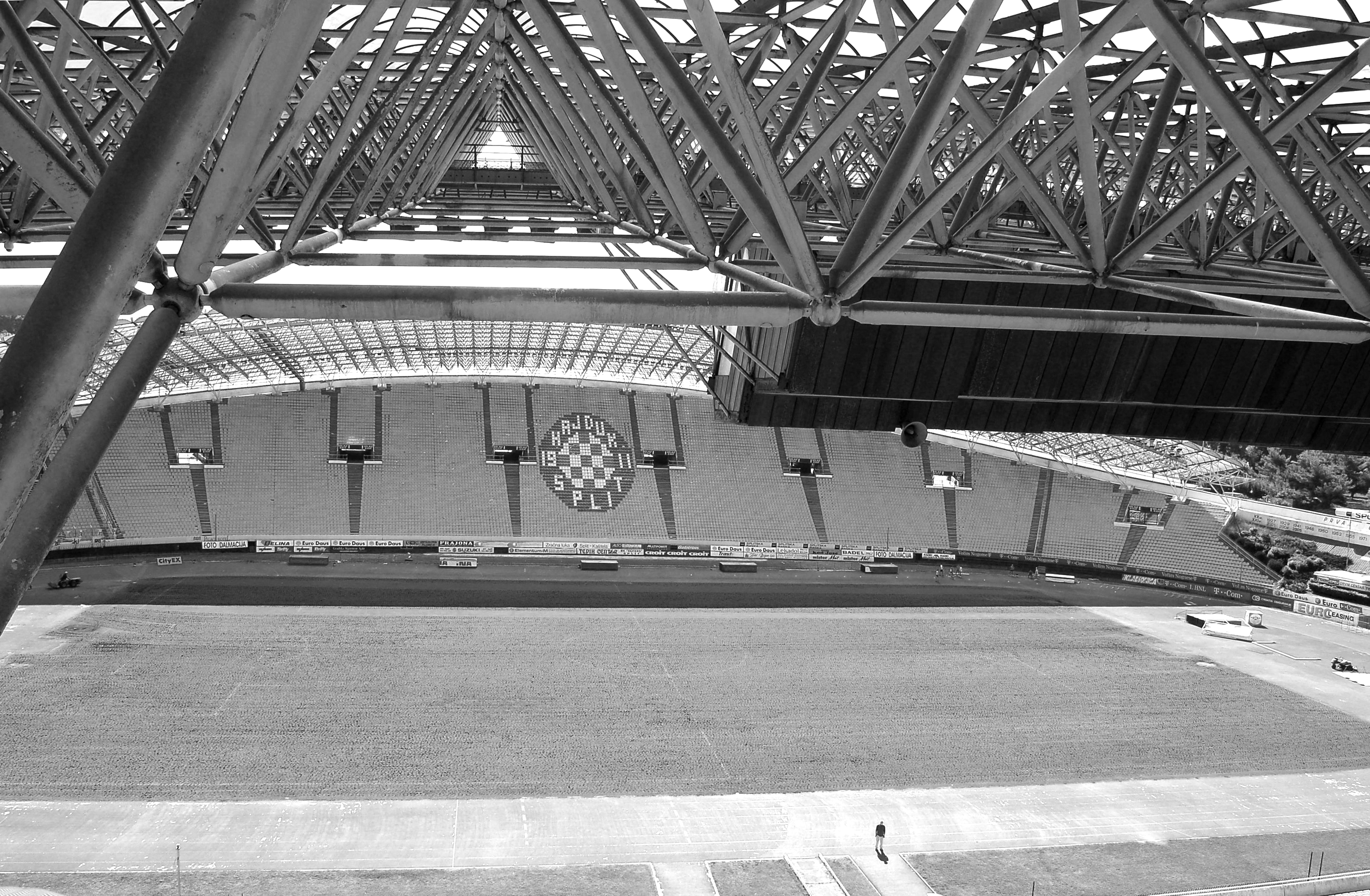
Poljud stadium in Split, Croatia, showing the Mero roof structure, and the figure of the stadium's architect Boris Magas seen to the bottom right.

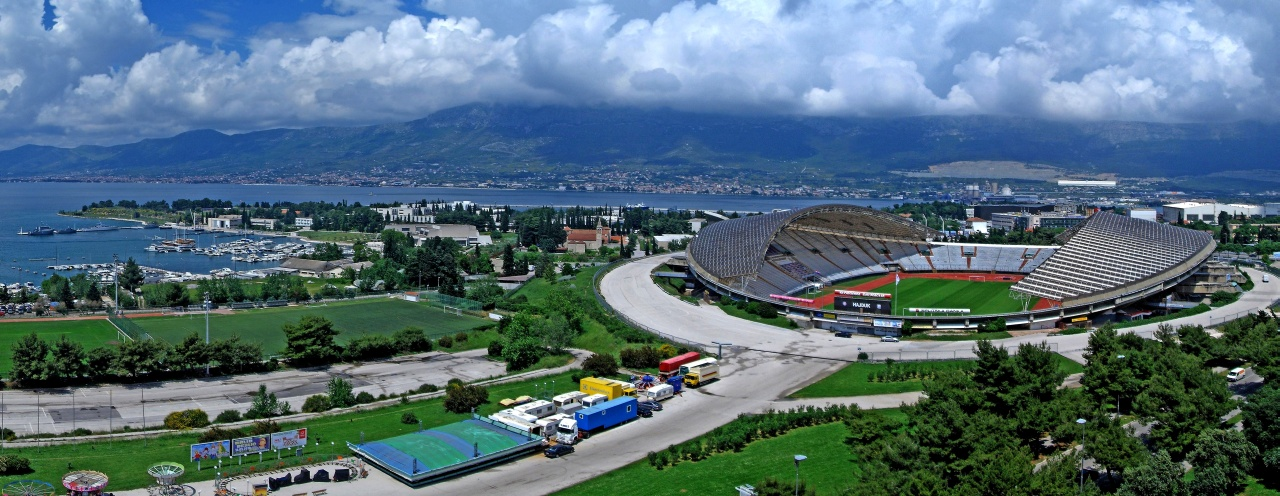
Poljud stadium, 1979

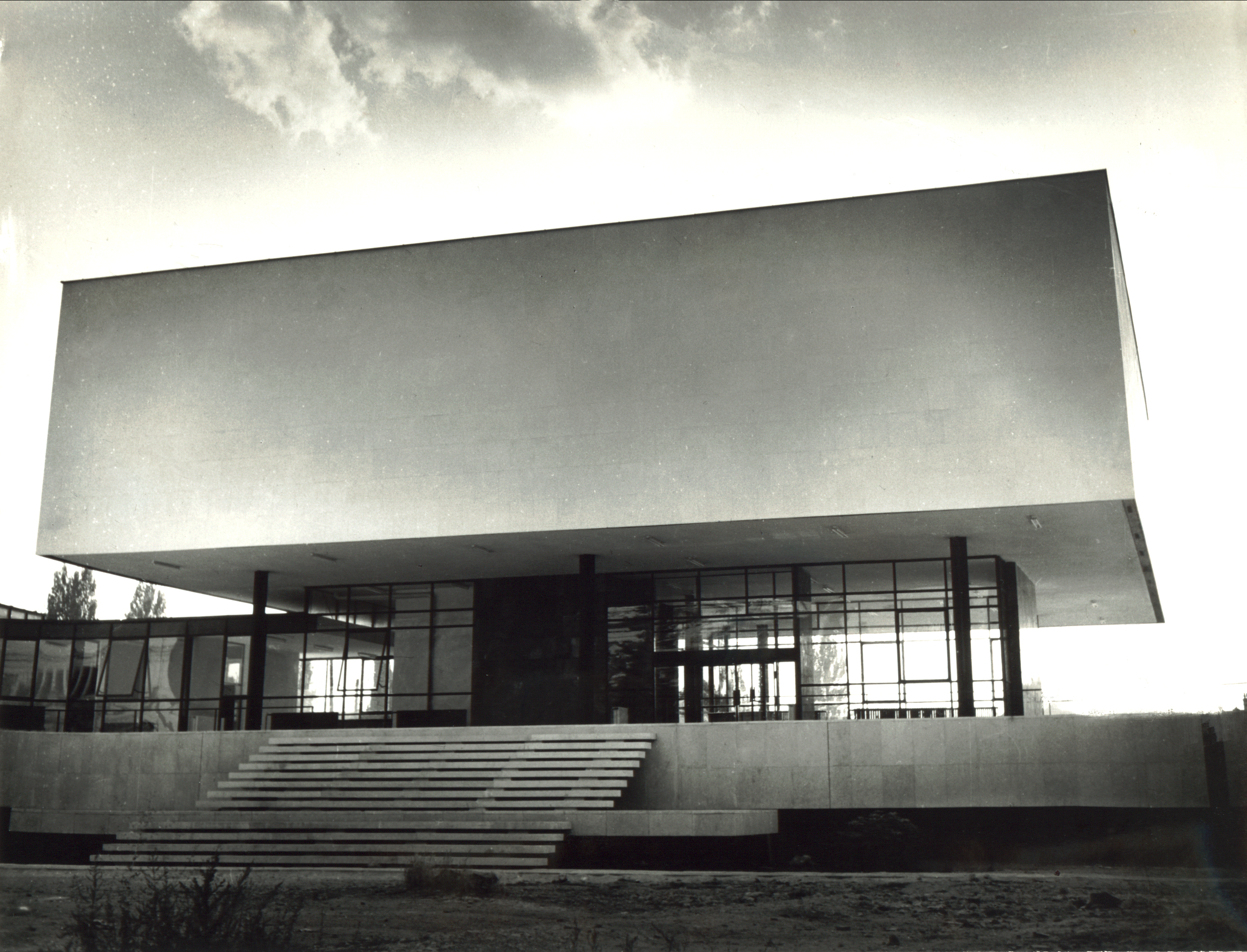
The Historical Museum of Bosnia and Herzegovina by architect Boris Magaš, 1963.

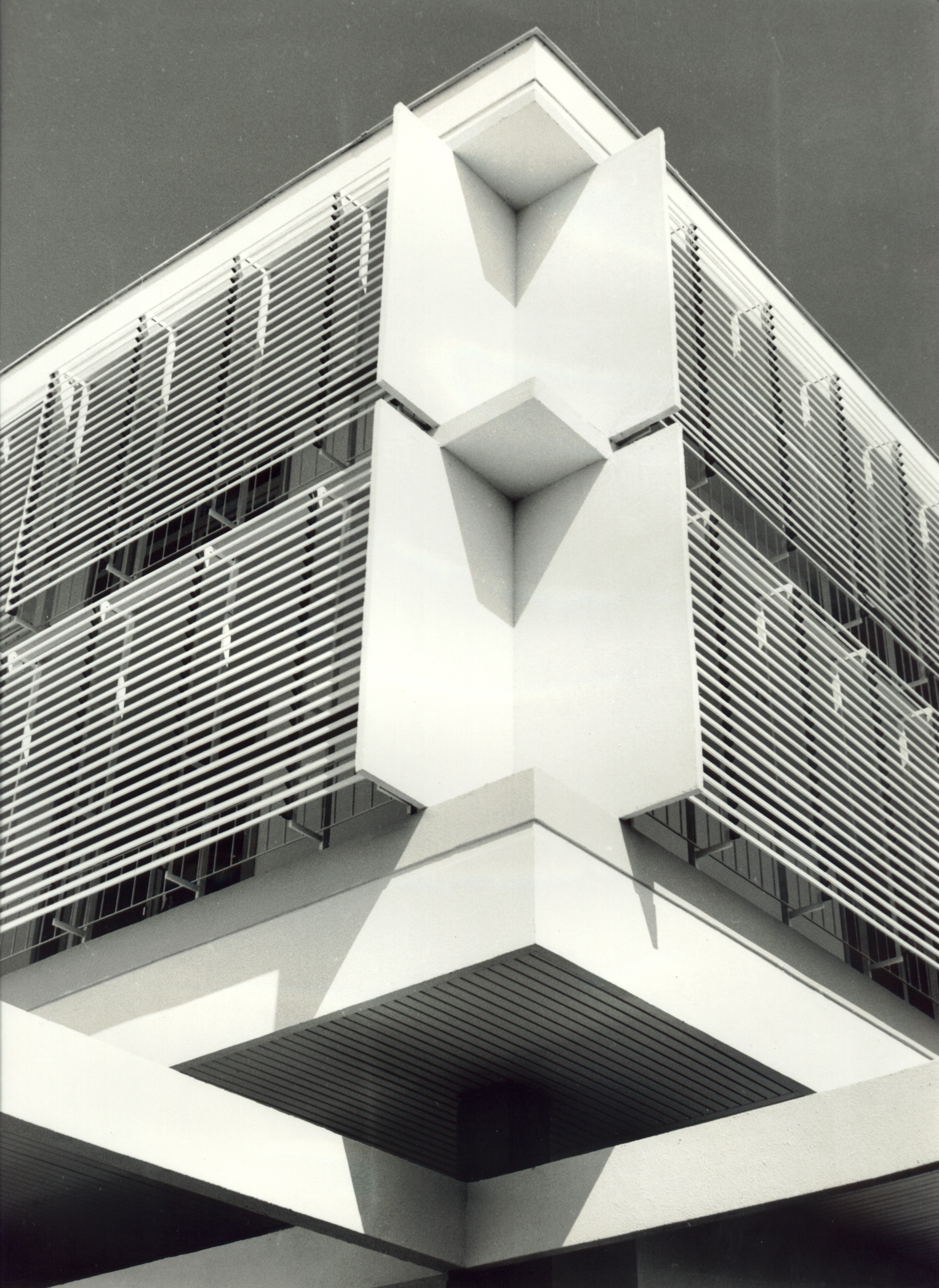
Solaris Hotels corner detail by architect Boris Magaš, 1967-1968

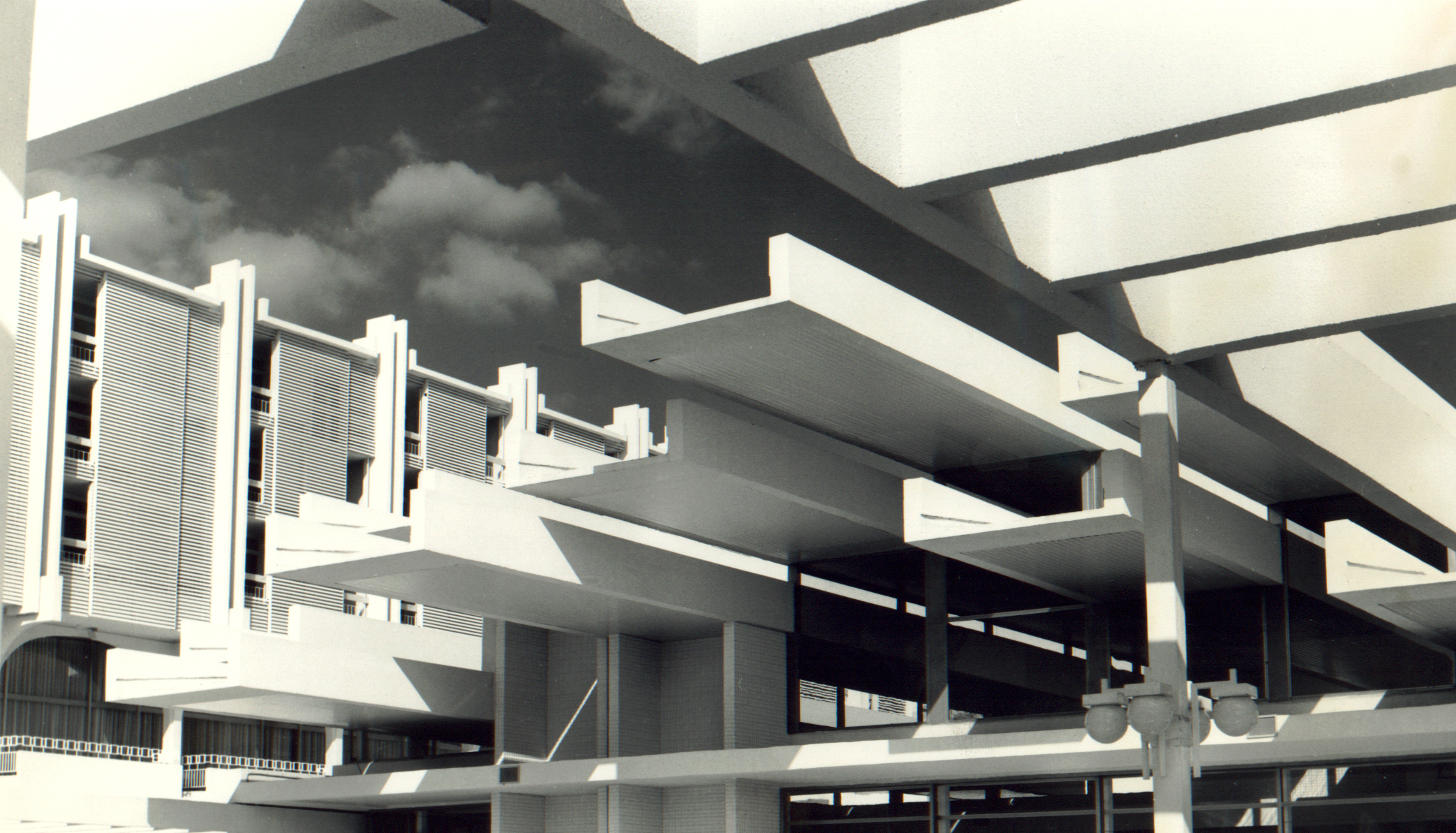
Haludovo Hotel Palace by architect Boris Magaš, 1969-1972

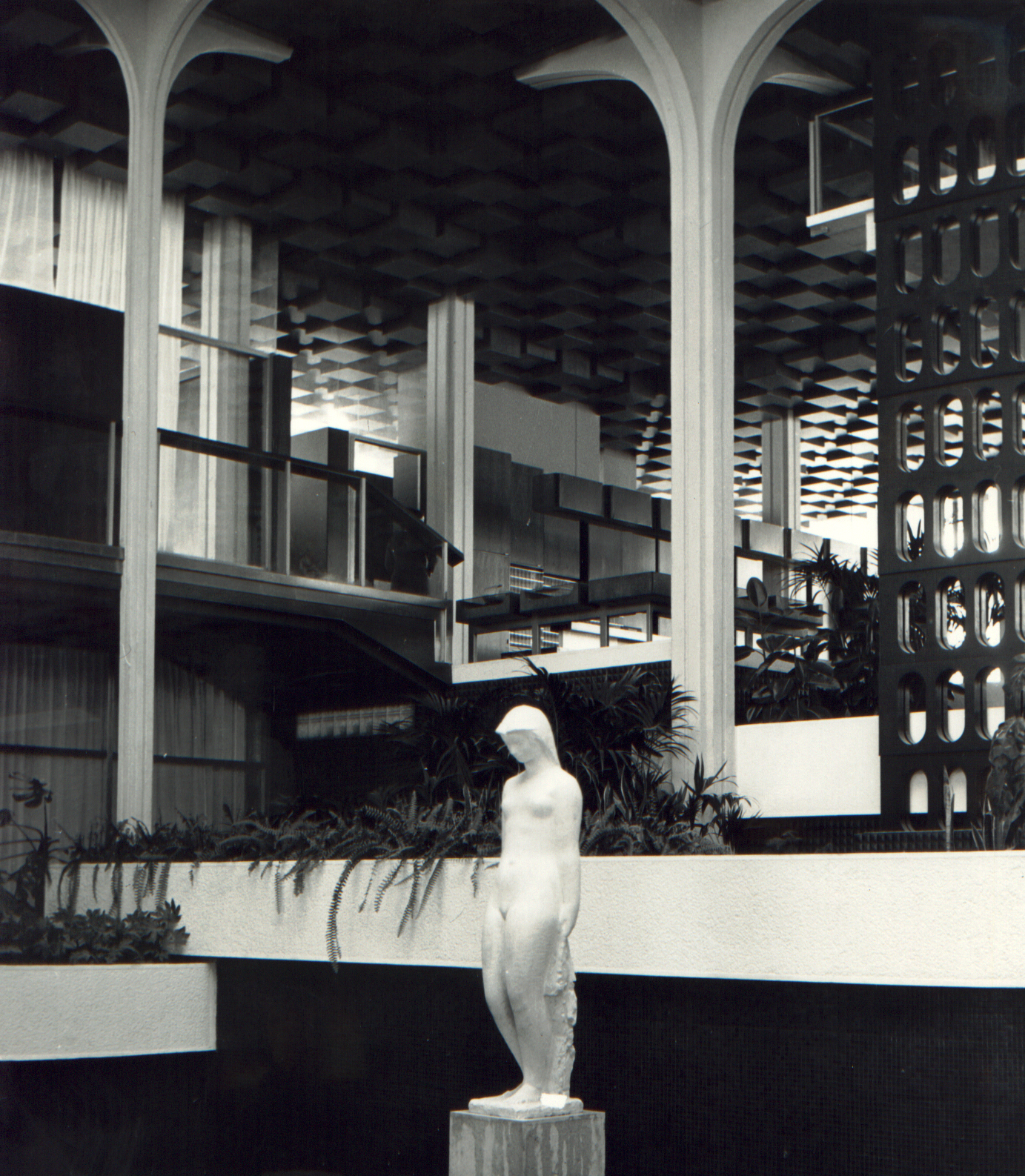
Haludovo Palace Hotel Main Hall by architect Boris Magaš

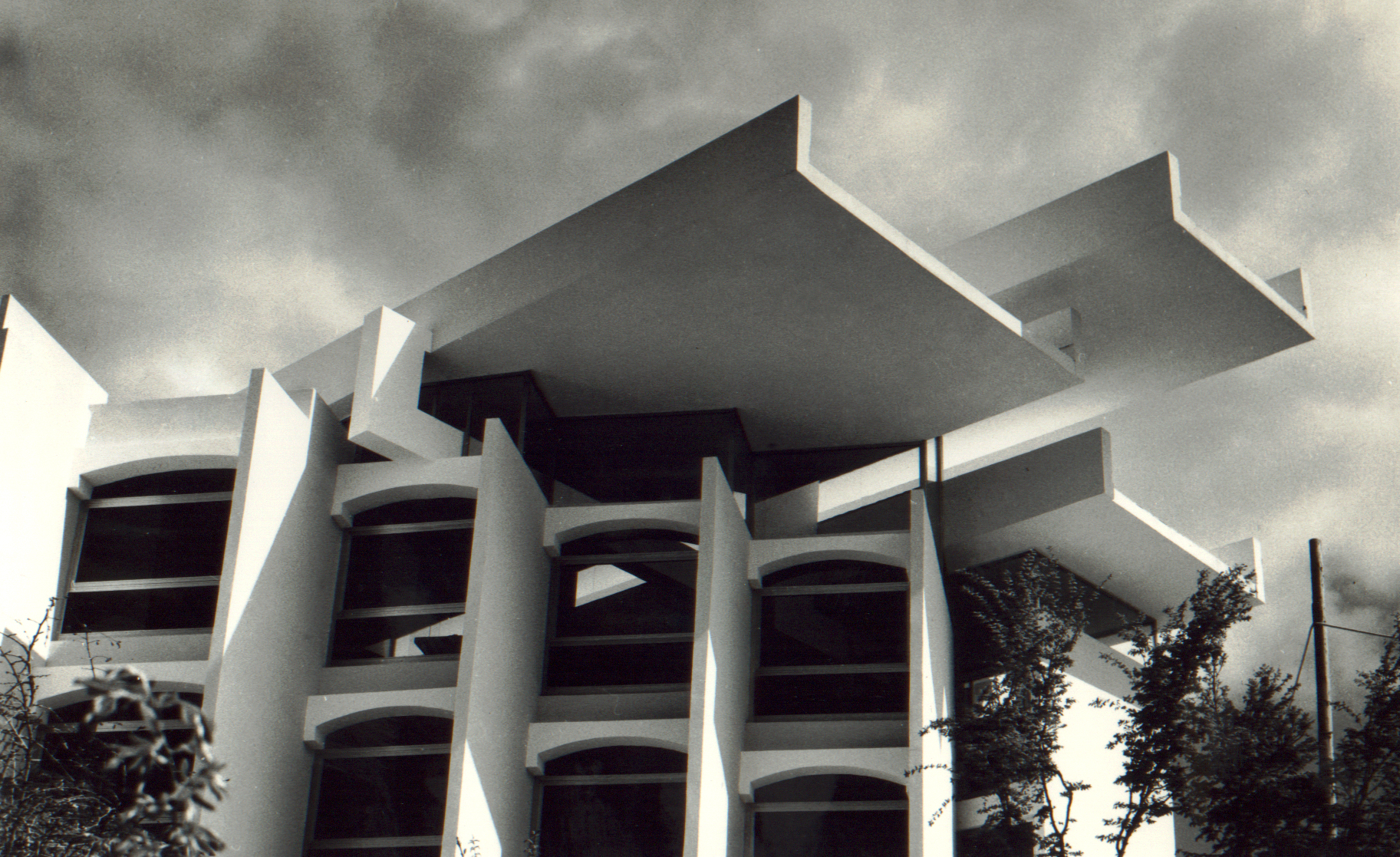
Haludovo Hotels by architect Boris Magaš

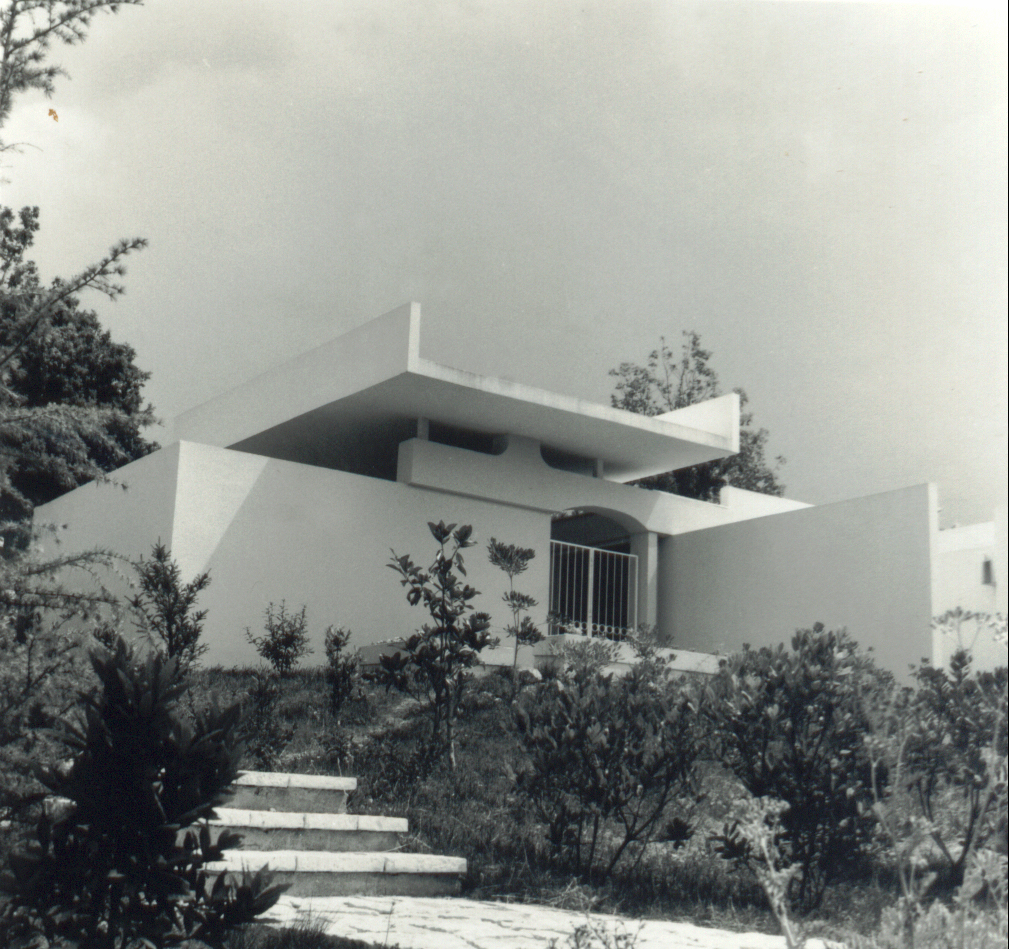
Haludovo Hotels Villa by architect Boris Magaš

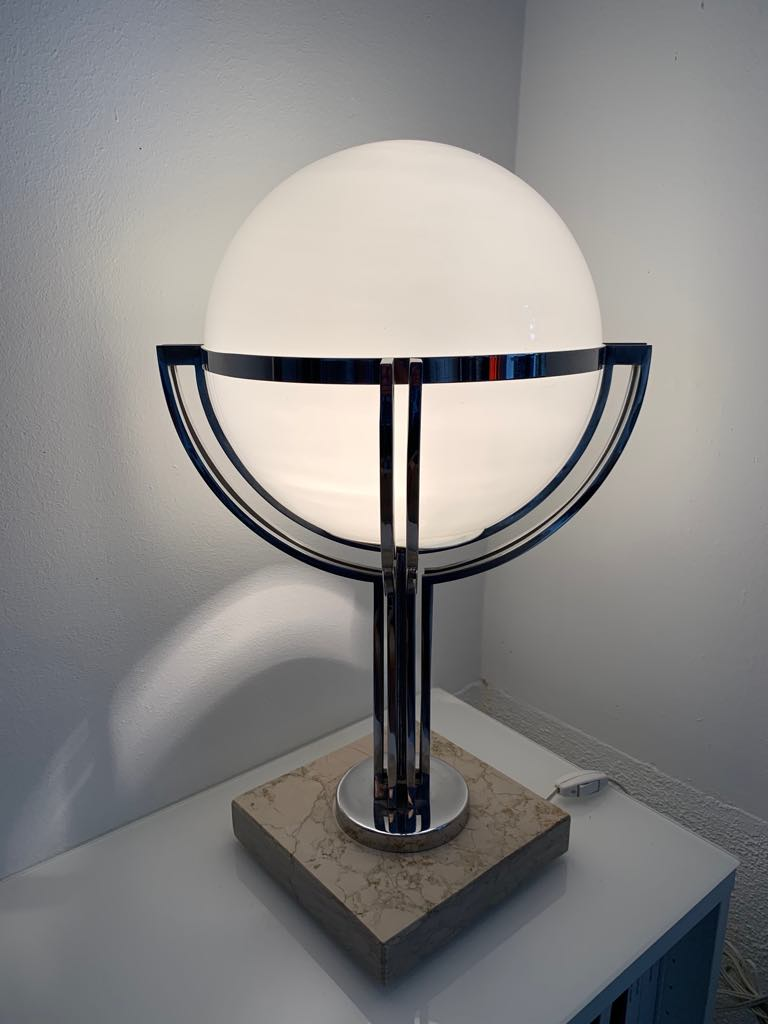
Haludovo Hotels lighting design by architect Boris Magaš

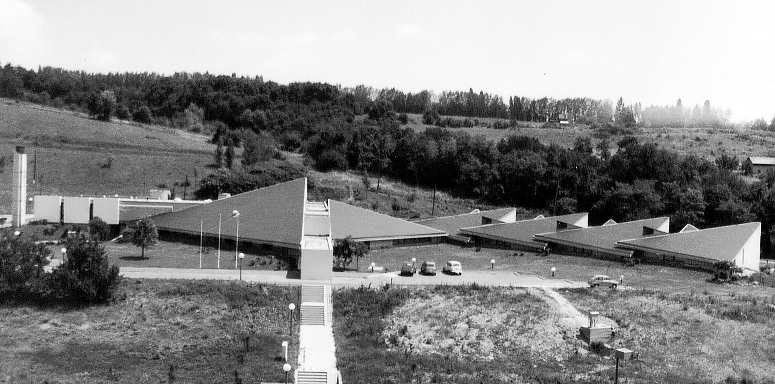
The Vjeverica kindergarten and nursery in the Mihaljevac park in Zagreb designed in 1973-1975 by architect Boris Magaš

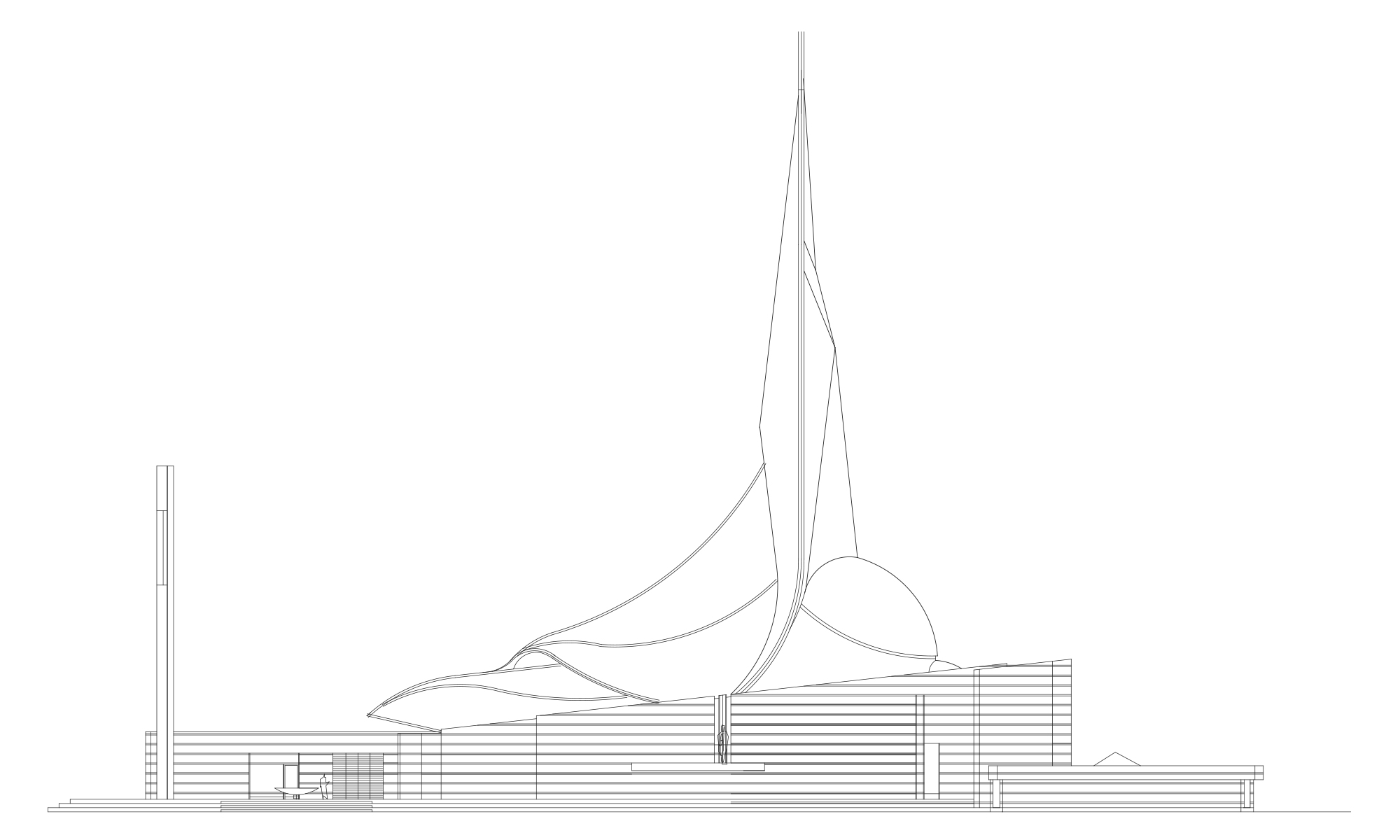
Church of the Bl. Augustine Kažotić in Zagreb by architect Boris Magaš

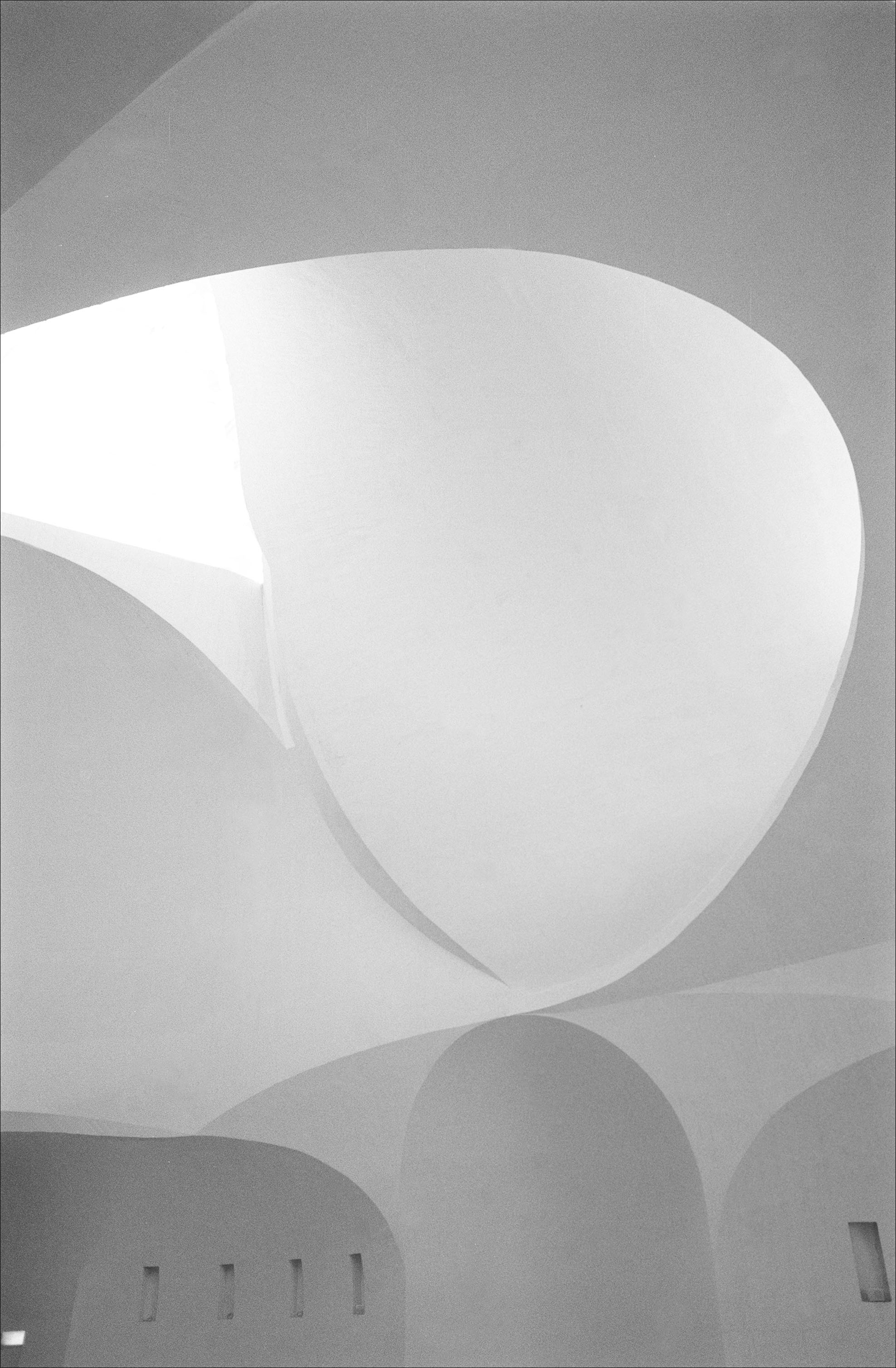
Interior of the Church of the Blessed Augustine Kažotić in Zagreb by architect Boris Magaš

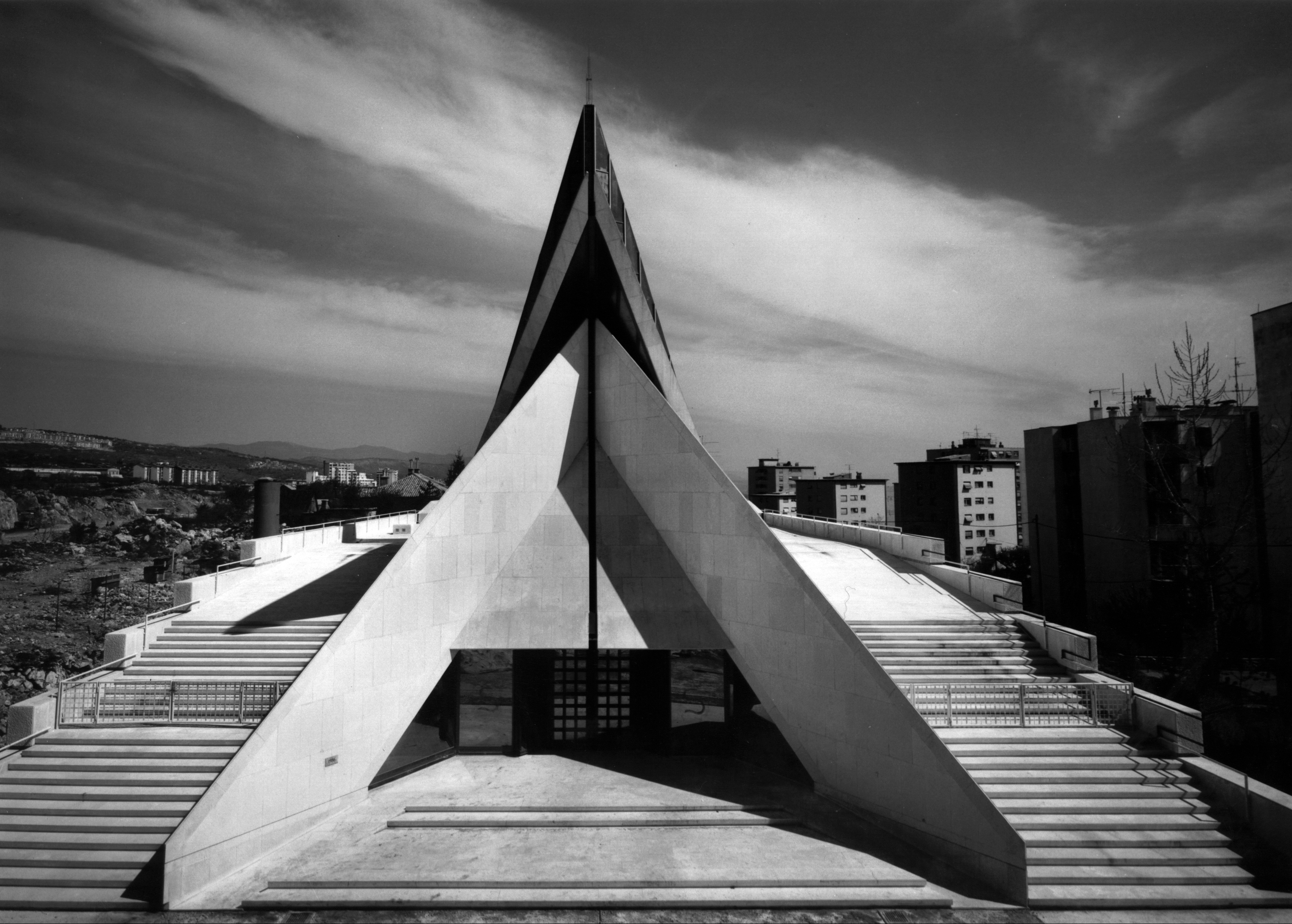
The church of St. Nicholas Tavelić in Rijeka by architect Boris Magaš, 1981–88

He is responsible for several canonical works of Croatian architecture of the second half of the 20th century - a series of unique buildings that resonated in the wider national and international context. German cultural historian Udo Kultermann devoted a chapter to the Boris Magaš oeuvre in "Contemporary Architecture in Eastern Europe" (1985). In 2019 five of his completed works featured in "Towards a Concrete Utopia: Architecture in Yugoslavia 1948-1980" at the Museum of Modern Art in New York, including the Poljud stadium, the Museum of Liberation in Sarajevo, the Solaris hotel complex, the Haludovo hotel complex, and the Vjeverica kindergarten and nursery.

=== Poljud stadium ===
The impressive football stadium building Stadion Poljud was designed in 1976 and built for the Mediterranean Games in Split in 1979. The stadium was published in a range of global architectural magazines and received three National Awards in 1979, "Borba", "Vladimir Nazor" and "Nikola Tesla", as well as the Zagreb Salon Grand Prize in 1980. The design is considered a work of exceptional artistic expression and suggestiveness, which combines the elemental power of the ambience and conceptual simplicity. The stadium is designed as a maximally clean form, a massive elegant shell, covered with an airy roof with a lacy steel construction by the German construction system Mero. The 206 meter roof span was the largest of its kind at the time of the construction. On November 23, 2015, the Poljud stadium was declared a National Heritage Listed Building of the Republic of Croatia.

=== Historical Museum of Bosnia and Herzegovina ===
Following the aesthetics of the International Style, in 1958 he designed his first notable work, the Museum of the Liberation in Sarajevo, now the Historical Museum of Bosnia and Herzegovina, with E. Šmidihen and R. Horvat. The design received the National Award "Viktor Kovačić" in 1963. The design is an abstract composition of simple, clean forms. The solid, protruding cubic volume of the upper floor appears to float above the transparent glass and metal supporting structure. On November 8, 2012, the building was officially declared a National Monument of Bosnia and Herzegovina. In 2018 the Getty Foundation awarded a grant for the conservation of the building as part of its "Keeping it Modern" initiative.

=== The Solaris hotel complex ===
During the 1960s he developed a distinct style for tourist architecture primarily as the architecture of space and ambience, expanding the range of modernist forms and their functions. In 1967-1968 he designed the hotels "Jure" and "Niko" as part of the hotel complex Solaris near Šibenik. The design received the National Award "Borba" in 1968 for the originality of the approach and the high level of architectural design introducing associative and symbolic elements that interpret the regional tradition of the Croatian coastal area.

=== The Haludovo hotel complex ===
In 1969-1972 he designed the Haludovo hotel complex in Malinska, a luxury resort including the Haludovo Palace Hotel, a series of villas, and the Fisherman's Village which reinterpreted the coastal vernacular architecture, in an early anticipation of the postmodern in Croatian architecture. The hotel complex was initially launched in partnership with Bob Guccione of Penthouse (magazine), and attracted international media attention. Despite being declared a work of national importance by the Croatian Society of Architects, the hotel was largely destroyed after it fell into ownership of the Armenian Ara Abramyan and became a place of pilgrimage for students of architecture. In 2016 it featured in the popular television series "Slumbering Concrete", and in 2018 it was the focus of the exhibition "Haludizam/Haluddism" by Croatian photographer Damir Fabijanić.

=== Vjeverica kindergarten and nursery ===
In 1973-1975 he designed the Vjeverica kindergarten and nursery in the Mihaljevac park in Zagreb. The design received the National Award "Borba" in 1975. The horizontally articulated design with an interplay of triangular roof elements had a significant influence on the construction of kindergartens in Croatia.

=== Other works ===
The designs of the kindergartens "Trnsko" and "Knežija" in Zagreb (1975) and the Faculty of Law in Rijeka, rational forms in which strong horizontals prevail (1980, with his wife Olga Magaš) also stand out. He also built several sacral buildings: the complex of the monastery and the church of St. Nikola Tavelić on Turnić (1981–88), a prominent example of Rijeka's modern architecture and in Zagreb's Volovčica the complex of the monastery and church of the Blessed Augustine Kažotić (1995–2004), in which light floods the interior from the top tower and illuminates the congregation spreading from the pulpit.

Among the unrealized projects are the National Theater in Zenica (1962, shortlisted competition, with V. Turina), the first-prize winning competition projects Residential Building in Šibenik (1955, with Šmidihen and Horvat), Kindergarten (1962), Multi-use building for Children (1968), Hidroelektra Headquarters (1986), Jarun Stadium (1998) in Zagreb, Health Center in Labin (1963, with M. Vodičko), Hotel complex "Pical" in Poreč (1971), Hotel in Ulcinj (1974), winning proposal for the Faculty of Civil Engineering in Rijeka (1978, 1979 with Olga Magaš), Central Cemetery of St. Lucija in Kostrena (1997) and Bridge in Padova (2000).

=== Awards ===
As well as numerous awards for individual works, he received two lifetime achievement awards for architecture: "Vladimir Nazor" in 1991 and "Viktor Kovačić" in 1993. In 1997 he was awarded the "Fran Bošnjaković" Award for contribution to academic work. The same year he received the Croatian National order of chivalry Order of Danica Hrvatska "Marko Marulić" for culture.

== Architectural theory ==
In his theoretical and design work, he seeks to establish correlations between the paths of ownership and the general international values of the existing architectural moment by developing his own approach within the contemporary movements of architectural thought.

=== Books on architectural theory ===
Based on his lectures, he wrote his magnum opus Architecture: Approach to Architectural Work (2012), which, by presenting a critical history of world architecture and its thoughts, and a guide to design considerations, provides a synthesis of his own theoretical thoughts and design experience. A collection of selected texts was published posthumously in "Reflections on Architecture" (2014), edited by Alen Žunić, and extended texts in "Thoughts on Architecture" (2018).

=== Articles on architectural theory ===
Key to the development of his theoretical thought were his participation in conservation research during 1953–66 (he wrote about architectural interventions in historical units in Hvar in the Bulletin JAZU, 1964), his studies in historical heritage, and his awareness of local values and the context of Croatian space. He published works in which he often criticized modernism in architecture, while distancing himself from the extremes of postmodernism (Arhitektura, 1984–86; Bulletin HAZU, 1994; collection The Cultural Dimension of Scientific and Technological Development. Zagreb 1994; Čovjek i prostor, 1996). He returned to historical themes with a synthesis of Croatian architecture of the 19th century in the edition Croatia and Europe (4th Zagreb 2009).

=== Journal articles ===
His articles in periodicals focus on specific projects and broader contextual reflections. He wrote about the architecture of theaters (Zenica Theater Project in Arhitektura, 1962), kindergartens (Arhitektura, 1962; Mihaljevac Kindergarten in Čovjek i prostor, 1976) and museums (the museum in Sarajevo in the Parisian magazine L'Architecture d'aujourd'hui, 1964), construction of tourist architecture in a natural environment (Hotelska kuća, 1972; macropedic article Buildings, hotels in the Technical Encyclopedia 13, 1997; on Solaris and Haludovo in Arhitektura, 1969, 1972), sports architecture (Proceedings of the Faculty of Civil Engineering, University of Rijeka, 1981; on the stadium in Poljud in the journals Čovjek i prostor, 1979, Architektura, 1980, Domus (magazine), Milan 1980, and Deutsche Bauzeitschrift, Gütersloh 1981) and on the challenges of contemporary sacral architecture (Zbornik Bogoslužni prostor, Zadar 1996; Rijeka Theological Journal, 2009; Art Bulletin, 2014).

=== Forewords and editorials ===
He published texts in the exhibition catalogues of D. Kovačić (Split 2000) and R. Nikšić (Zagreb 2005), wrote about the theoretical thought of V. Kovačić (collection Architect Viktor Kovačić. Zagreb 2003) and Mohorovičić (Prostor, 2005). He is the author of the foreword in the books of Z. Pađan (Predarhitektura. Zagreb 2007; Origin of Architecture. Zagreb 2011) and in the first volume of the edition Architectural Dialogues (Discourse on Croatian Architectural Theory. Zagreb 2013) and associate and editor of architecture and urbanism in the Technical Lexicon LZ (2007) .

== Completed works (selection) ==
- 1963 Museum of the Liberation, now the Historical Museum of Bosnia and Herzegovina in Sarajevo (with: E. Šmidihen, R. Horvat)
- 1968-1969 Hotel complex "Solaris", Šibenik.
- 1969-1972 Hotel complex "Haludovo", including Haludovo Palace Hotel in Malinska on the island of Krk.
- 1975 Vjeverica Kindergarten and nursery "Mihaljevac", Zagreb
- 1975 Kindergarten and nursery "Trnsko", Zagreb
- 1975 Kindergarten "Knežija", Zagreb
- 1976-1979 City Stadium Stadion Poljud in Split
- 1980 Faculty of Law, Rijeka (with Olga Magaš)
- 1981 Church of St. Nikola, Rijeka.
- 1998 Church of Augustin Kažotić, Zagreb

== First prize-winning competition works ==
- 1955 Residential building, Šibenik (with: E. Šmidihen, R. Horvat)
- 1958 Museum of the Liberation (with: E. Šmidihen, R. Horvat)
- 1962 Kindergarten (module), Zagreb
- 1963 Sanatorium, Labin (with: M. Vodička)
- 1966 Hotel complex "Solaris", Šibenik
- 1968 Combined children's institution (typical), Zagreb
- 1971 Hotel complex "Pical", Porec
- 1974 Hotel, Ulcinj
- 1976 Stadium of the Mediterranean Games Split (City Stadium, Poljud)
- 1978 Faculty of Civil Engineering, Rijeka
- 1979 Faculty of Civil Engineering, Rijeka (with: Olga Magaš)
- 1980 Faculty of Law, Rijeka (with: Olga Magaš)
- 1986 Administrative building of "Hidroelektra", Zagreb
- 1998 “Jarun” Stadium, Zagreb

== Projects (selection) ==
- 1963 Reconstruction and adaptation of the Hektorović Palace, Hvar
- 1964 Theatre, Zenica (with V. Turin)
- 1997 Central Cemetery of St. Lucija, Kostrena
- 1998 Church with monastery Bl. Augustine Kazotica, Zagreb
- 2000 Bridge in Padua, Italy

== Published papers (selection) ==
- 1965 Contribution to solving the problem of architectural interventions within historical units, "Bulletin JAZU", no. 3, p. 44.
- 1981 Elements of the spatial function of large sports facilities, Proceedings of the FGZ (fakultet graditeljskih znanosti), 6, Rijeka
- 1981 Draft of a theory of architecture, RTV Zagreb, III. program
- 1985 Traces of Movement, “Architecture”, 37-38. (189-195): 62, Zagreb
- 1986 Knowledge and Possibilities of Theoretical Thought, “Architecture”, 39 (196-199): 27, Zagreb
- 1993 Vernacular Culture and Architecture, “Cultural Dimension of Scientific and Technological Development”, Scientific Conference of the Croatian Academy of Sciences and Arts, UNESCO, University of Zagreb and European Academy of Sciences, Arts and Literature, October 1–3, 1993.
- 1994 Paths of Property in Architectural Theoretical Thought at the Turn of the Century, Bulletin of the Croatian Academy of Sciences and Arts, 42 (1): 25.
- 1994 Viktor Kovačić's Theoretical Thought, Scientific Conference "Viktor Kovačić 1874-1924", October 20–23, 1994.

== Awards ==
- 1963 Annual "Viktor Kovačić" Award (with: E. Šmidihen, R. Horvat)
- 1968 National Award "Borba"
- 1968 Medal of the Faculty of Architecture, University of Zagreb
- 1969 Medal of the City of Šibenik
- 1972 Plaque of the Federal Chamber of Commerce of Yugoslavia
- 1975 National Award "Borba"
- 1979 National Award "Borba"
- 1979 Annual Vladimir Nazor Award
- 1979 Award for scientific work "Nikola Tesla"
- 1979 Golden Coat of Arms of the City of Split
- 1980 Grand Prize of the 15th Zagreb Salon
- 1991 Vladimir Nazor Award for Lifetime Achievement
- 1993 "Viktor Kovačić" Lifetime Achievement Award
- 1997 Award "Fran Bošnjaković" for contribution to academic work
- 1997 National order of chivalry Order of Danica Hrvatska "Marko Marulić" for culture

== Exhibitions and symposia (selected) ==
- 2019 Towards a Concrete Utopia: Architecture in Yugoslavia 1948-1980, Museum of Modern Art (MoMA), New York.
- 2014 Croatian Pavilion, Venice Biennale of Architecture
- 2014 Scientific Symposium on the Architect Boris Magaš, The Association for the Protection and Development of Cultural and Natural Heritage of Karlovac, Faculty of Architecture in Zagreb and Faculty of Civil Engineering in Rijeka.
- 2014 Palaces and Ruins of Third Way Modernisation. The Legacy of Socialist Architecture and Urbanism in Yugoslavia. Austrian Cultural Forum

== Bibliography ==
- Architecture: Approach to Architectural Work (2012). 576 pp, 24x30cm. ISBN 978-953-0316-92-8
- Reflections on architecture (2014) Alen Žunić (editor) ISBN 978-953-7703-26-4
- Thoughts on architecture - extended edition (2018) Alen Žunić (editor) ISBN 978-953-7703-53-0

== Media (selected) ==
- 2012 Documentary "Portrait of Boris Magaš" (Renata Margaretić Urlić editor), Croatian national television Hrvatska radiotelevizija (HRT).
- 2016 The Haludovo Hotel Complex is the subject of the opening episode of the "Slumbering Concrete" series, produced for Croatian national television Hrvatska radiotelevizija (HRT).
- 2020 "Slumbering Concrete" featured as part of "Concrete Utopia: Focus on Croatian Cinema and Architecture" at BOZAR, Centre for Fine Arts, Brussels, co-organised with the Croatian Presidency of the European Union.
