= MTF Labs =

Series of music festivals

MTF Labs / Music Tech Fest
- Organisation logo
- Dates: 2012-present
- Locations: Aveiro, Berlin, Boston, Frankfurt, Genoa, Helsinki, Karlsruhe, Liège, Ljubljana, London, Örebro, Paris, Pula, Stockholm, Umeå and Wellington
- Founders: Michela Magas
- Website: MTF Labs official site

MTF Labs is a series of festivals and events encouraging innovation through creative work, particularly music.

Since the first Music Tech Fest in 2012, a community has formed around the festival with over 7,500 members from fields such as medicine, aviation, product design, AI, music composition, microcomputing, traditional crafts, neuroscience, ecology and economics.

The first MTF Labs took place at Music Tech Fest Berlin in 2016. In 2018, MTF Labs superseded Music Tech Fest to become the main activity. The festival was run by a UK design company until 2018, when the Swedish company MTF Labs AB was established specifically in order to organise MTF Labs events and promote the activities of its community.

It has been hosted worldwide by partners including IRCAM, The London Symphony Orchestra, SoundCloud, Mixcloud, The BBC, EMI, RCA Records, Shazam, Last.fm, and a number of others.

== History ==
Music Tech Fest began as result of the Roadmap for Music Information Research (MIReS), a European FP7 project run by seven European research centers: Music Technology Group at the Universitat Pompeu Fabra in Barcelona; OFAI, Austrian Research Institute for Artificial Intelligence, Vienna, Austria; Instituto de Engenharia de Sistemas e Computadores, Porto, Portugal; IRCAM at the Centre Pompidou in Paris; Centre for Digital Music (C4DM), Queen Mary, University of London, UK; and Barcelona Music and Audio Technology (BMAT), Barcelona, Spain.

The project's Scientific Director Michela Magas of Stromatolite launched the first Music Tech Fest event in London 2012 as a way to bring academics and practitioners together. The first festival included contributions from EMI, BBC, Spotify, SoundCloud and Shazam as well as academic researchers, makers, developers and artists. MTF London 2012 featured 54 performers and presenters, 70 hackers and 70 creatives.

In May 2013 the festival ran again in London with the additional involvement of all of the major record labels. In September of that year, Professor Andrew Dubber from Birmingham City University joined as festival director. In 2014, the festival went on tour with events in Wellington, Boston, London, Berlin and Paris. In 2015 festival organisers scheduled larger regional events, rather than focusing on individual cities: MTF Scandinavia in Umeå and MTF Central Europe in Ljubljana. In September 2018, MTF took part in Stockholm, Sweden. It had more than 500 participants and some prominent artists as guests, including Imogen Heap.

Starting with 2015, the Music Tech Fest is supported by the EU Horizon 2020 project MusicBricks.

== Hack Camp ==
Music Tech Fest supports the growing hack culture, and promotes it as an important source of creativity. The festival frequently contains its own hackathon, MTF Hack Camp, which runs for 24 hours from Saturday afternoon to Sunday. Like Music Hack Day events, the MTF hack camp focuses on music-related hack challenges, but with a particular focus on performance with tangible objects, physical concepts and new integrations between software and hardware. There are competitions held at each MTF hack camp where individuals and groups work in response to particular challenges that reflect the themes of each festival. MTF hack camp challenges have engaged with ideas of accessibility (London 2014), fashion and wearables (Paris 2014), and creative spaces (Berlin 2014).

The festivals in London and Umeå also involve a Kids Hack which Andrew Dubber discussed in an interview for WebTVspot as an 'opportunity for families and young people to get involved'. The MTF website and YouTube pages show performances from the Kids Hack, of participants presenting simple gestural controllers and instruments. Some of the older 'hackers' showed some more complex projects including a remote controlled Tricopter with a camera which was connected to some video goggles to navigate and film the Tricopters flight.

== Trackathon ==
Similar to a hackathon but for music producers, Music Tech Fest's trackathon gives musicians 24 hours, audio tools and samples with which to make a piece of music adhering to a unique challenge or brief set by the festival. For example, remixing a song by English indie rock band Everything Everything (London 2013) or making a 'sad banger' (Stockholm 2018). At MTF Stockholm the winning tracks were released as an album, the proceeds of which went to the charity Musicians Without Borders.

== MTF Umeå 2015 (MTF Scandi) ==
MTF Scandi took place in Umeå Sweden from the 29–31 May 2015. The festival included presentations and performances from Jon Eades from Abbey Road Red, Abbey Road's new technology and innovation incubator, electronic artist Scanner, Robin Rimbaud and founder of English electronic group 808 State, Graham Massey.

The 24hr Hack Camp had four hack challenges of which there were seven winning teams. Each challenge reflected the values and ideas spread by MTF; the 'Music Things for Music Ecosystems' and 'The Sound Objects in Smart Homes' challenge connected with ideas of collaboration and the Internet of Things, IoT. The Cymatics Challenge aimed to explore the relationships between sonic and visual art through this interdisciplinary medium. The final challenge from MTF Scandi was the 'Music as Communication' which focused on music tools that were communicative and accessible. Four winning teams used the #MusicBricks technologies which, led to the funding and incubation of their projects to develop them further. Incubation was also awarded to the two winning hacks from the 'Music Things for Music Ecosystems' and 'Music as Communication' prizes from Umeå based incubators eXpression, and the final winning Cymatics team were awarded the materials to help with future endeavours.

The Volvo Kids Hack ran on Sunday, led by Siobhan Ramsey of Sandbox Education, with presentations on stage. Young Hackers, aged between 8-12 used tools from Arduino and Bare Conductive to create interactive instruments and musical interfaces.

MTF Scandi also included two new editions, a Jam Camp which lasted the duration of the festival and a Trackathon which ran for a week. The Jam Camp, led by Obi Blanche, was a space for people to try out music technology and play together. This culminated in a Jam performance on stage on the final night of the festival. The trackathon was sponsored by Toontrack and was a competition to create a track using the company's drum software. The two winners of the challenge, CJ Carr and Matan Berkowitz had their tracks mastered and released on Bandcamp by members of the judging panel including Vince Lynch, Pascal Guyon and Phonat (Michele Balduzzi). All money raised went to a charity supporting artists suffering from depression.

MTF Scandi was held at Sliperiet - a co-creative space in Umeå Arts Campus where MTF is based, alongside many other creative enterprises. Throughout the weekend, organisations from Sliperiet put on sound installations around the upper floors of the building. These included ‘The Voice Harvester’ by Swedish ICT Interactive, ‘Audification of Absence’ by Willem Zwagers, and ‘Bubble Room Instrument’, ‘Bridging Realities Collaborative’, ‘Untitled 5:22mins’ and ‘Silent Forest’ by JAQ. There were also two installations on the ground floor from outside of Sliperiet; James Brewster's Electro Acoustic Cafe, and ‘The Worlds Biggest Midi Controller’ by Hakan Lidbo.

There was also a gamification workshop on Saturday, which led to the development of the CreaCity platform for the city of Umeå, Sweden. CreaCity was released as part of the European SPECIFI project to develop tools for engagement with city culture and local businesses.

Sponsors and partners of MTF Scandinavia include; 4Sound, Bare Conductive, Beer Studio, Costas of Sweden, Electronic Sound, Drake Music, Guitars – the Museum, Hansson & Hammar, HUMlab Umeå, Kulturverket, Jays, Kitmonsters, Laser Unicorns, Musikanten, Sliperiet Umeå Universitet, Sonos, Soundation, SoundCloud, Spendrups, Swedbank, Teenage Engineering, Tiljan, Toontrack, U & Me Hotel, Umeå University, Umeå kommun, Umenet, Uminova Innovation, Uminova eXpression, Visit Umeå, Volvo, Warner Music Group, topi, YNK Produktion, Ninja Tune.

== MTF Ljubljana 2015 (MTF Central) ==
From the 18–21 September 2015 MTF held #MTFCentral at Cankarjev Dom and +MSUM, the Museum of Modern Art (Ljubljana), in Ljubljana Slovenia. The festival ran in partnership with Earzoom Sonic Arts Festival, IRZU. The festival included performances from producers and musicians Graham Massey, Håkan Lidbo, composer and musician Nitin Sawhney, composer and beatboxer Reeps One, composer and professor Rolf Gehlhaar and more.

The festival included a 24hr Hack Camp combining light and sound technologies, art and performances.

There was also a Jam Camp at #MTFCentral led by the founder of the Ninja Tune record label, Matt Black.

On the last day there was held a #MTFResearch symposium.

== MTF Berlin 2016 ==
The 10th festival by Music Tech Fest was MTF Berlin which took place in Berlin Germany from the 27–30 May 2016. The event was held in a large broadcasting hall called Funkhaus Berlin at the Rundfunk der DDR. There were many performances held during this festival by various artists including Eska (singer), Emika, Mechanical Techno Graham Dunning, the bionic pop artist Viktoria Modesta, the Swedish composer and instrument maker Martin Molin, the robot lego band TOA Mata Band and more.

The festival followed the launch of the first week-long MTF Labs that focused on Transhumanism, Blockchain, Vocal Tech and Hack the Audience.

As previous festivals, MTF Berlin also included a 24hr Hack Camp. Farnell element14 supplied the camp with components and Benjamin Heckendorn joined the event and recorded an episode of the Ben Heck Show on site. The themes of the hack camp were Music as an Extension of the Human Body, Mod Devices Linux Challenge, Giant Steps and Hack the Bus. The winner was Electronic Jungles who paired the #MTFBricks R-IoT board with components to make a performance using fashion wearable technologies, animal masks, gesture-driven music and reactive visuals.

MTF Berlin also included a Trackathon led by Ian Wallman, a nominee of the Ivor Novello Awards and remixer of Beyoncé, Lady Gaga and others, coached a group of 12 electronic producers to create a dance track in 24 hours.

== MTF Stockholm 2018 ==
MTF Stockholm took place in Stockholm Sweden from the 7–9 September 2018. The showcase was held at KTH Royal Institute of Technology with performances from musicians and record producers Håkan Lidbo, Jan Bang, Graham Massey and more.

MTF Stockholm had a 24hr Hack Camp led by technologist, TV presenter, sound designer, inventor and NASA datanaut LJ Rich.

Tekla, a techfestival founded by Swedish artist Robyn and KTH, held a dancing robotics workshop for young teenage girls at MTF Stockholm.

The British artist and polymath Imogen Heap participated in many areas of MTF Stockholm. Heap led a Mycelia Blockchain Labs during the week-long #MTFLabs leading up to the festival and at the festival a Creative passport exhibition with Mycelia experience. Heap also led a Mini.Mu session at the festival directed to families which involved making your own Mi.Mu glove.

MTF Stockholm ran a 24hr Trackathon led by the English producer Laura Bettinson (also known as FEMME). The task was to create a 'sad banger' were the winning track was 'Cold' by Ruben Svensson (producer) and Nina Butler. The best tracks were selected and released as an EP were all the profits gained were donated to the charity Musicians Without Borders by the winners choice.

== Festival contributors ==
Contributors to the festival have included: IRCAM, The London Symphony Orchestra, SoundCloud, Mixcloud, The BBC, EMI, RCA Records, Shazam, Last.fm, Ableton, Native Instruments, Izotope, FXpansion, RS Components, RjDj, WIRED, MTV, Microsoft Research, Cisco, Stephen Fry/Penguin, EU Commission, DMIC, British Council, Sound and Music, MTG, Fraunhofer Society, BCU, MIT Media Lab, Berklee College of Music, McGill, Goldsmiths, Royal College of Art, Ninja Tune, Warp, The Echo Nest, MusicBrainz, Reactable, Jamie Cullum, Tim Exile, Leafcutter John.

== Media coverage ==
- TNW (website) covered MTF London 2012
- Sandbox Education covered Kids Hacks in London

== See also ==
- Hackathon
- Music Hack Day
