= Music Hack Day =

Music Hack Day is a Hack Day specifically for the music industry. The first was organised by Dave Haynes and James Darling and held at the London offices of The Guardian newspaper over the weekend 11/12 July 2009.

The event was attended by around 200 developers who had 24 hours to build new hacks or web applications using the API's or tools of 10 participating companies. These companies were 7digital, BBC Music, The Echo Nest, Gigulate, Last.fm, PeoplesMusicStore, Songkick, SoundCloud. The weekend also included workshops from companies like RjDj and Tinker.it and anyone else who wished to arrange one. Many developers stayed overnight at the venue and over 35 hacks were built, submitted and demo'ed by the end of the weekend.

Since that first event, more than 50 Music Hack Day events have taken place around the world, with over 3500 participants who have built over 1300 innovative hacks.

The events are attended by a diverse range of music and technology enthusiasts. A related event, that includes a music hack component, but with a broader focus on performance and research, is the Music Tech Fest, a festival of music ideas that brings musicians, artists, hackers, academics and industry together.
