= Eva-Maria Westbroek =

Dutch soprano opera singer (born 1970)

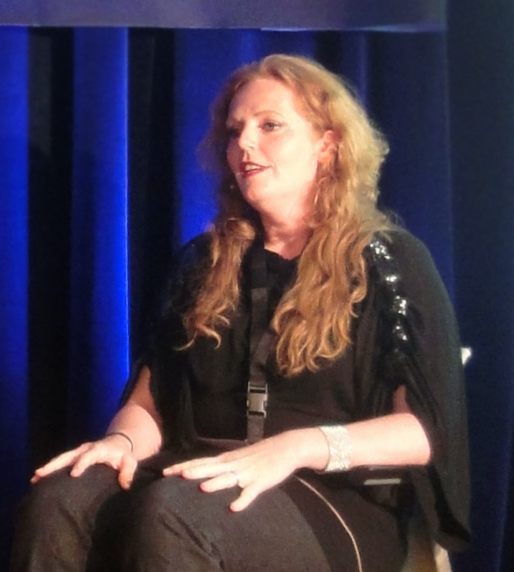
Eva-Maria Westbroek at TEDxTheHague

Eva-Maria Westbroek (born 26 April 1970) is a Dutch soprano.

== Biography ==
Westbroek is one of three daughters of the geology researcher and professor Peter Westbroek. Westbroek studied at the Royal Conservatory of The Hague from 1988 to 1995. Her vocal teachers included Iris Adami Corradetti and the American tenor James McCray.

== Career ==
=== 1990s ===
Westbroek made her operatic debut at the Aldeburgh Festival in 1994 as Mère Marie in Poulenc's Dialogues des Carmélites. She was a prize winner at an international competition in Rome, which allowed her to sing the role of Tosca at age 25. She also was a laureate at the Angelica Catalani Concours and the Santa Maria Ligure Concours. A subsequent slow spell in her career followed, during which time her mother died. Westbroek also worked as a singing waitress during that period.

=== 2000s ===
In 2001, Westbroek secured a five-year contract as a company member of the Staatsoper Stuttgart. Her roles in Stuttgart included Carlotta (Schreker, Die Gezeichneten), Tosca, Emilia Marty (Janáček, Věc Makropulos), Desdemona (Verdi, Otello), Donna Anna (Mozart, Don Giovanni), Giulietta (Offenbach, Les Contes d'Hoffmann), Marie (Smetana, The Bartered Bride) and The Duchess of Parma (Busoni, Doktor Faust). In 2006, at the end of her work in Stuttgart, she was given the title of Kammersängerin der Staatsoper Stuttgart.

In 2003, Westbroek debuted at the Salzburger Festspiele as Agave in a concert performance of Egon Wellesz' Die Bakchantinnen. In 2004, she debuted at the Opéra Bastille as Madame Lidoine in Poulenc's Dialogues des Carmélites. Her debut at De Nederlandse Opera was as Katerina Izmailova in Shostakovich's Lady Macbeth of Mtsensk. This performance was commercially recorded for DVD release, and Westbroek won first prize from the Dutch VSCD Classical Music in the category "most impressive individual artistic achievement" for this performance. She repeated this role in her debut at the Royal Opera House, Covent Garden in London in October 2006. In 2008, she won the Grand Prix Antoine Livio of the Presse Musicale Internationale.

Her debut at the Bayreuth Festival came in 2008, as Sieglinde. She reprised the role there in 2009.

Westbroek made her debut at the Staatsoper in München in 2008 as Chrysothemis in Elektra. She has returned to München as Jenůfa (title role), Ariadne (Ariadne auf Naxos) and Georgetta (Il Tabarro).

=== 2010s ===
In her first world premiere production, Westbroek created the role of Anna Nicole Smith in the February 2011 Royal Opera premiere of Mark-Anthony Turnage's opera Anna Nicole at Covent Garden. Other roles she performed at the ROH include Giorgetta (Il Tabarro), Dido (Les Troyens), Maddalena (Andrea Chénier), Santuzza (Cavalleria Rusticana), Katarina (Lady Macbeth of Mtsensk), Minnie (La Fanciulla del West) Sieglinde (Die Walküre) and Elisabeth (Tannhäuser).

Westbroek made her Metropolitan Opera debut on April 22, 2011, singing the role of Sieglinde in the premiere of a new production of Wagner's Die Walküre directed by Robert Lepage. Unfortunately, she had to withdraw mid-performance after the first act due to illness. Mezzo-soprano Margaret Jane Wray stepped in to complete the evening's performance. Westbroek finally sang the entire opera the following week on April 25, 2011. She became a Met regular, and returned to New York to sing the title role in Francesca di Rimini, Katarina (Lady Macbeth of Mtsensk), Elisabeth (Tannhäuser) and Santuzza in (Cavalleria Rusticana). In the 2018/2019 season she sang Minnie in La Fanciulla del West and Sieglinde in Die Walküre, both of which were screened in cinemas worldwide.

Westbroek's commercial recordings include Bohuslav Martinů's Julietta, in the title role, for VMS Music Treasures, and two recorded productions of Wagner's Die Walküre as Sieglinde, on DVD and on CD. She is also featured in a DVD recording (Opus Arte) of Puccini's La fanciulla del West as Minnie, her own acknowledged favourite role, and in DVD recording of Giordano's Andrea Chenier, in the role of Maddalena (Warner Classics), with Jonas Kaufmann in the title role.

== Personal life ==
Westbroek is married to the tenor Frank van Aken. She does charity work for the organization Musicians without Borders.

Westbroek experienced increasing frequency of vocal problems in 2022. In August 2025, she announced the curtailment of her professional singing career, with a shift in musical focus to giving vocal masterclasses. Westbroek has developed an alternative career in organic farming. She is the subject of the 2026 documentary Eva-Maria Westbroek, terug naar de aarde ('Eva-Maria Westbroek, back to the earth').
