= European Prize for Women Innovators =

European Prize for Women Innovators (formerly European Woman Innovator of the Year) is a prize awarded by the European Union.

== Laureates ==
=== 2022 ===
Women Innovators

- Rocío Arroyo, Spain
- Ciara Clancy, Ireland
- Ninna Granucci, France

Rising Innovators

- Niamh Donnelly, Ireland
- Iva Gumnishka, Bulgaria
- Mehak Mumtaz, Portugal

=== 2021 ===
- Merel Boers, Netherlands
- Mathilde Jakobsen, Denmark
- Daphne Haim Langford, Israel
- youth prize: Ailbhe Keane and Isabel Keane, Ireland
- Special mention prize for their achievements:
  - In the main category: Asude Altıntaş, Turkey
  - In the Rising Innovator category: Livia Ng, UK

=== 2020 ===
- Madiha Derouazi, Switzerland
- Maria Fatima Lucas, Portugal
- Arancha Martinez, Spain
- youth prize: Josefien Groot, Netherlands
- Special mention prize for their achievements:
  - In the main category: Cécile Real (France)
  - In the Rising Innovator category:
    - Ailbhe Keane (Ireland)
    - Rebecca Saive (Germany),

=== 2019 ===
- Irina Borodina, Lithuania
- Martine Caroff, France
- Shimrit Perkol-Finkel, Israel
- youth prize: Michela Puddu, Italy

=== 2018 ===
- 1st: Gabriella Colucci, Italy
- 2nd: Alicia Asín Pérez, Spain
- 3rd: Walburga Fröhlich, Austria
- youth prize: Karen Dolva, Norway

=== 2017 ===
- 1st: Michela Magas, Croatia/ UK
- 2nd: Petra Wadström, Sweden
- 3rd: Claudia Gärtner, Germany
- youth prize: Kristina Tsvetanova, Bulgaria.

=== 2016 ===
- 1st: Susana Sargento, Portugal
- 2nd:Sirpa Jalkanen, Finland
- 3rd: Sarah Bourke, Ireland

=== 2014 ===
- 1st: Saskia Biskup, Germany
- 2nd: Laura van 't Veer Netherlands
- 3rd: Ana Maiques

=== 2011 ===
- 1st: Gitte Neubauer, Germany
- 2nd: Fabienne Hermitte, France
- 3rd: Ilaria Rosso, Italy
