= Gabriella Colucci =

Italian research chemist

- Born: 1960s Naples
- Known for: Agricultural science

Gabriella Colucci (born 1960s) is an Italian researcher who identifies plant based chemicals for industrial use. She won the EU Women Innovators Award in 2018.

== Career ==
Colucci was born in Naples in the 1960s. She specialized in agricultural science.

In 1994, she went on an exchange to work for a year in Nigeria. Afterwards, she started research at the University of California, San Diego and at Arena Pharmaceuticals. After ten years, she returned to Italy, where she started her own company.

In June 2018, she won the European Woman Innovator of the Year award in recognition of the 35 chemicals she had identified that have potential applications in cosmetics or agrochemicals. Her Italian company was able to identify these chemicals by interpreting the messages that are sent between cells. She took the 100,000 euro prize. The second place went to Spaniard Alicia Asín Pére whose work relates to the Internet of Things and the third to Austrian Walburga Fröhlich. The young award went to Norwegian Karen Dolva, who had devised a robot for socially inactive people. The prizes were awarded by European Commissioner Carlos Moedas and Eva Kaili MEP, who chairs the European Parliament’s Science and Technology Options Assessment body.
