= Michela Magas =

Croatian-British designer and entrepreneur

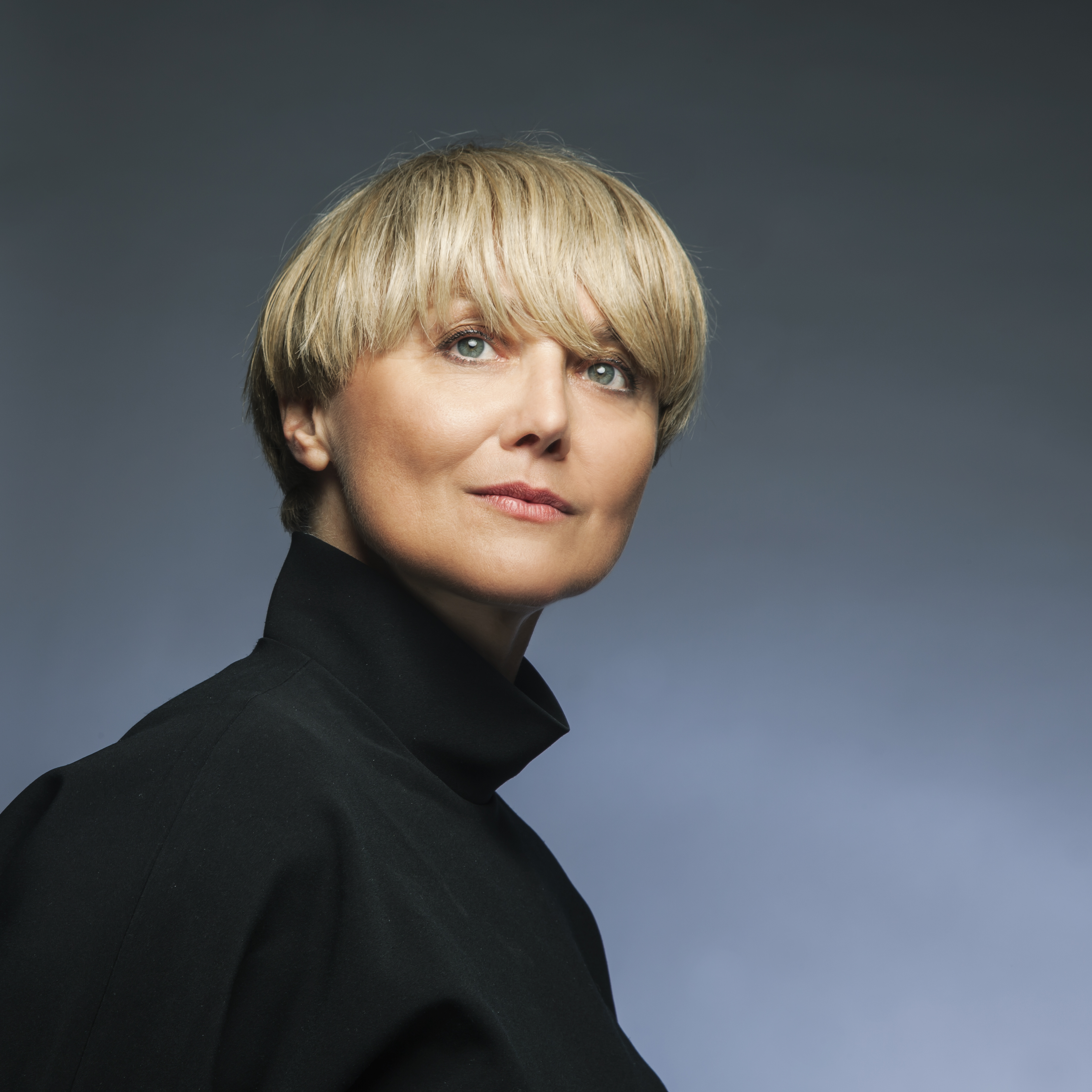
- Alma mater: Royal College of Art; Goldsmiths, University of London
- Employer: Financial Times (1995–2000)
- Parent(s): Boris Magaš
- Awards: European Prize for Women Innovators (2017)
- Website: michelamagas.com

Michela Magas is a designer, entrepreneur and innovation specialist, of Croatian-British nationality, and is the first woman from the Creative Industries to receive the European Woman Innovator of the Year award by the European Commission.

== Family and education ==
She is the daughter of the architects Olga and Boris Magaš, and was raised in Rijeka, Croatia, where she was educated at Italian elementary and secondary schools, before graduating in design from the Royal College of Art in London.

== Career ==
From 1995 until the end of 2000 she worked at the Financial Times, as a designer, becoming Art Editor.

She is the co-founder, with Peter Russell-Clarke, of the London-based design innovation lab Stromatolite, whose clients include Nike, Nokia and Apple.

She is the founder of Music Tech Fest, and chairs the Industry Commons Foundation.

In December 2019 she was recognised as an "Outstanding Peer Reviewer" by Leonardo, the International Society for the Arts, Sciences and Technology.

In 2016 she was awarded Innovation Luminary for Creative Innovation by the European Commission.

Since about 2015, she has lived in Umeå, Sweden, and works nomadically.

== Publications ==
- Dubber, A., Magas, M., 2024. Regional Innovation Model Handbook. Industry Commons Foundation. Link
- Emanuilov, I., Magas, M., 2024. White Paper on Data Documentation for JUST Data Practices. Zenodo. Link
- Magas, M., Kiritsis, D., Poveda-Villalón, M., Yang, L., Björling, S.-E., Rudenå, A., 2024. Ecosystem integration: the use of ontologies in integrating knowledge across manufacturing value networks. Frontiers in Manufacturing Technology. 4. Link
- Magas, M., 2024 contribution to Lindvall, J., Nilsson, A.G., Danielsson, P., Svensberg, L. et al, Vinnova Policy Paper for Commons for Development of More Efficient Innovation Ecosystems. Link
- Magas, M., 2023. You Are Not Normal: how design innovation collapses myths of gender and disability, in Formia, E., Gianfrate, V., & Succini, L. (eds), Design for Responsible Innovation, FrancoAngeli. Link
- Magas, M., Radziwon, A., Altosaar, A., Wretblad, L., Emanuilov, I., Bertels, N., 2022. White Paper: IP and Industry Agreements towards Industry Commons. Link
- Magas, M., 2022 contribution to European Commission, Directorate-General for Communications Networks, Content and Technology, Izsak, K., Terrier, A., Kreutzer, S., et al. Opportunities and challenges of artificial intelligence technologies for the cultural and creative sectors. Publications Office of the European Union. Link
- Magas, M., Dubber, A. and Marsden, R., 2022. Intellectual Property and the Industry Commons: Unlocking the Renaissance, in European Crew, 2022, The Next Renaissance Culture and Creativity Shaping Europe, Odile Jacob Link
- Magas, M. (contributor) in Martin, C. et al, 2022. Backing Visionary Entrepreneurs: Realising the Deep-Tech Entrepreneurial Talent of Europe (Report of the EIC Expert Group on Design of the EIC Marketplace and Tech to Market Activities), European Innovation Council
- Michela Magas & Dimitris Kiritsis, 2021. Industry Commons: an ecosystem approach to horizontal enablers for sustainable cross-domain industrial innovation (a positioning paper), International Journal of Production Research, DOI: 10.1080/00207543.2021.1989514 Link
- Magas, M. et al, 2021. New European Bauhaus: Concept paper by the High-Level Roundtable, European Commission. Link
- Magas, M., 2020. Green Paper: CCI Innovation to Lead Beyond the Pandemic, presented at Framing Creative Futures – The 10th European Creative Industries Summit (ECIS 2020). Link
- Magas, M, and Dubber, A., 2020. Expanding EOSC: Engagement of the wider public and private sectors in EOSC, Study funded by the European Union’s Horizon Programme call H2020-INFRAEOSC-2018-4, Grant Agreement number 831644, EOSCsecretariat.eu 2020. Link
- Magas, M. in Taisch, M., Casidsid, M.L., May, G., Morin, T.R., Padelli, V., Pinzone, M., Wuest, T. (eds)., 2020. World Manufacturing Report 2020: Manufacturing in the Age of Artificial Intelligence. Link
- Magas, M., 2018. 7 Ingredients for the Industry Commons. Link
- Magas, M. and Koek, A., Lerhman-Madsen, O., Beetz, K., Curley, M., de Waele, W., Herlitschka, S., 2016. CAF Innovation Recommendations, H2020 Work Programme 2018–2020. DG Connect Advisory Forum, European Commission.
- Magas, M., Fledderus, E. and Herlitschka, S., et al. 2016. CAF's recommendations for H2020's work program 2018–2020. DG Connect Advisory Forum, European Commission.
- Magas, M. and Dubber, A. 2016. Final Public Report. #MusicBricks European Commission H2020 project report.
- Magas, M., van der Klauw, K. et al., 2015. Report on Analysis and Recommendations for Innovation Ecosystems: The Alliance for Internet of Things Innovation (AIOTI). Published by the European Commission in October 2015.
- Magas, M., Lidy, T., and Schindler, A., 2015. MusicBricks: Connecting digital Creators to the Internet of Music Things. ERCIM NEWS, 101, pp.39–40.
- Magas, M., Laurier, C., 2014. Audio analysis system and method using audio segment characterisation. UK Intellectual Property Office Patent No. GB2523973B.Link
- Magas, M., Dubber, A., Sterne, J., Baym, N., et al., 2014. Manifesto for Music Technologists. Published by Microsoft Research Link
- Magas, M., Serra, X., Benetos, E., Chudy, M., Dixon, S., Flexer, A., Paytuvi, O., 2013. Roadmap for music information research. EU FP7.Link
- Magas, M. and Proutskova, P., 2013. A location-tracking interface for ethnomusicological collections. Journal of New Music Research, 42(2), pp.151–160.
- Magas, M., and Rea, C. 2012. Synaesthesia: Innovative music components for collaborating and creating music with objects in real space. Proceedings of the NEM Summit, Istanbul.
- Magas, M. and Proutskova, P., 2009. A location-tracking interface for ethnomusicological collections. In Workshop on Exploring Musical Information Spaces.
- Magas, M., Stewart, R. and Fields, B., 2009, August. decibel 151. In ACM SIGGRAPH 2009 Art Gallery (p. 21). ACM.
- Magas, M. and Proutskova, P. 2009. Beyond the metadata, new intelligent audio content search for large music collections. Unlocking Audio 2, British Library, London, UK.
- Magas, M. and Proutskova, P., 2009. A location-tracking interface for ethnomusicological collections. Proceedings of ECDL. Corfu, Greece.
- Magas, M., Casey, M.A. and Rhodes, C., 2008, August. mHashup: fast visual music discovery via locality sensitive hashing. In SIGGRAPH New Tech Demos (p. 26).
- Magas, M., Rhodes, C., Casey, M., d’Inverno, M., Knopke, I., and Slaney, M. 2008. Dark Media Navigation With the AudioDB Search System. International Conference on Music Information Retrieval (ISMIR)

== Media coverage ==
- Nomad Magazine covered Collaborative Innovator Michela Magas
- JN.pt covered Aveiro Tech week 2022
- TOUCHIT.sk covered Festival Art & Tech Days 2021
- Fraunhofer ISC on EIT Kultur & Kreativität - eine wegweisende Partnerschaft für ein erfolgreiches Europa
- OAGi (Open Applications Group): Industrial Ontologies Foundry Releases Core Ontology Beta
- Royal College of Art interview with Michela Magas
- Ara.cat on Michela Magas
- Forbes on Michela Magas and MTF
- Market insider on Music Tech Fest Hosts MTF Labs Together With Infobip in Croatia
- Leonardo.info on Recognition of outstanding peer reviewers
- Dagens industri covers Michela Magas
- BBC The Next Web on How the first Music Tech Fest explored the future of sound
- Bergenna.no covered Gründer-gatefest på OPPNÅ
- Financial Times Michela Magas' nomadic working life
- Yle Finland on Music Tech Fest -ryhmälle musiikki on sosiaalista liimaa: "Me emme ennusta tulevaisuutta, vaan luomme sitä"
- Poslovni.hr on Michela Magaš
- Vecernhi list on Živjela sam u Caritasu, jela tost. Slomila sam se kad je tata imao infarkt, no tad su me profesori ‘prošvercali’ pod studenta iz EU
- Dnevni avaz on Svjetski inovatori i studenti zajedničkim snagama pokreću inovativnu BiH
- VIDI on Michela Magaš
- Radio MOF: Interview with Michela Magas
- 24SATA on Michela Magaš
- BBC on Michela Magaš
- BBC European Prize for Women Innovators
- Women in Adria Što treba da bi se bilo najinovativnija europska poduzetnica Michela Magaš?
- Telegram Media Group: Michela Magaš europska je inovatorica godine, a ovo je njezin prvi životni intervju za naše medije
- Novi list Michela Magaš osvojila nagradu EU za inovatoricu godine: Riječanka tražilicom glazbe osvaja Europu
- Jutarnji List: Michela magaš, ona je vjerojatno najpoznatija hrvatica za koju niste čuli Svojim je inovacijama nevjerojatno utjecala na vaše živote i učinila ih lagodnijima
- Telegram Media Group: Donosimo veliku vijest; Michela Magaš jučer je u Bruxellesu proglašena inovatoricom godine
- Jutarnji List: Hrvatica Michela Magaš osvojila je prvu nagradu za EU inovatoricu godine i 100.000 eura, ali njen laboratorij za inovacije u dizajnu je u Britaniji
- Poslovni dnevnik: Michela Magaš dobitnica Nagrade Europske unije za inovatorice 2017
- The Calvert Journal: Croatian-British entrepreneur wins EU Prize for Women Innovators
- MTF Labs: Interview at Swedish Ambassador’s residence in Croatia
- WIRED Magazine (guest edited by Barack Obama): Bionic Artist Viktoria Modesta Transcends the Human Body
- Open Innovation 2.0 Conference 2016: Innovation Luminary Awards Ceremony Interview
- Collective Awareness Platforms for Sustainability and Social Innovation: Interview for CAPS 2015
- #OI2Conf Dublin: interview with Michela Magas, Stromatolite
- Digital Music trends: Michela Magas of Stromatolite and Music Tech Fest
- NEM Summit 2010: Interview with Michela Magas
