= Die Bakchantinnen =

1931 opera by Egon Wellesz

- Opera by Egon Wellesz
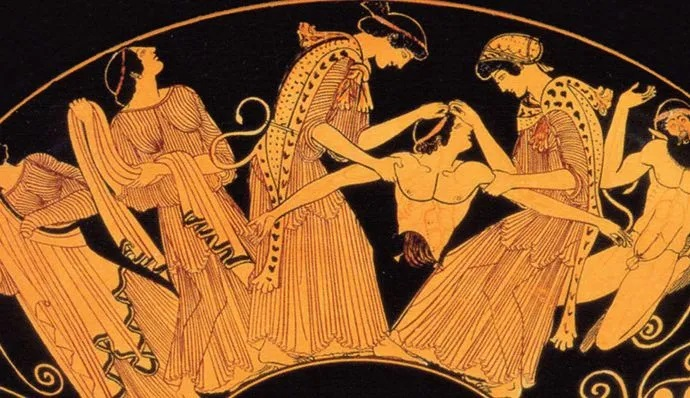
- Maenads tearing Pentheus apart
- Language: German
- Based on: The Bacchae of Euripides
- Premiere: 20 June 1931; Vienna State Opera

Die Bakchantinnen, Op. 44, is a 1931 German-language opera by Egon Wellesz to a libretto by the composer after Euripides' play The Bacchae as adapted by Hugo von Hofmannsthal.

Wellesz explicitly saw the figure of Dionysos, who gathers the people behind him with "illusion" and drives them to madness, as a parallel to the political seducers of his time. His opera was a clear warning against the delusion and seduction by Hitler and his followers.

== Subject ==
Euripides' drama of the punishment of Pentheus by the followers of Dionysos, the maenads, has been put into music several times during the 20th century – by composers from Poland, Italy, Germany, Sweden, the UK and the USA: Karol Szymanowski's wrote his cantata Agawe in 1917, Giorgio Federico Ghedini his opera in 1947. Most probably most often performed in this category was the opera Die Bassariden, composed by Hans Werner Henze, first performed at the Salzburg Festival in 1966. Finally, also John Buller (1992) and Daniel Börtz (1999) realized operas based on the Euripides plot.

== Roles ==
Roles, voice types, premiere cast
Role	Voice type	Premiere cast, 20 June 1931 Conductor: Clemens Krauss
Dionysos	baritone	Alfred Jerger
Teiresias	bass	Josef von Manowarda
Kadmos, king of Thebes	bass	Franz Markhoff
Königin Agave, daughter of Kadmos	soprano	Rose Pauly
Ino, daughter of Kadmos	soprano	Eva Hadrabova
Panthea, daughter of Kadmos	soprano	Dora With
Pentheus, son of Agave	tenor	Josef Kalenberg
Diener des Pentheus	baritone	Viktor Madin

The production was directed by Lothar Wallerstein, with sets and costumes by Alfred Roller. Including the premiere, there were four performances at the Vienna State Opera. The last one was on 17 June 1932.

== Performance history ==
In 1985, a concert version was produced at the Konzerthaus, Vienna, with the Vienna Radio Symphony Orchestra and the Slovak Philharmonic Chorus, conducted by Peter Gülke. The singers were Heinz Jürgen Demitz (Dionysos), Brenda Roberts (Königin Agave), László Polgár (Teiresias), Rudolf Mazzola (Kadmos), Magdalena Schuchter (Ino), Gabriele Sima (Panthea), Wolfgang Müller-Lorenz (Pentheus) and Rudolf Katzböck (Diener des Pentheus).

In 2003, a concert version was produced by the Salzburg Festival with the Vienna Radio Symphony Orchestra and the Slovak Philharmonic Chorus, conducted by Marc Albrecht. The singers were Roman Trekel (Dionysos), Georg Zeppenfeld (Teiresias), László Polgár (Kadmos), Eva-Maria Westbroek (Königin Agave), Alexandra Reinprecht (Ino), Márta Rozsa (Panthea) and Raymond Very (Pentheus).

In 2005, another concert version was produced at the Concertgebouw, Amsterdam with the Radio Filharmonisch Orkest and the Groot Omroepkoor, conducted by Edo de Waart. The singers were Elizabeth Byrne, Claudia Barainsky, Abbie Furmansky, Martin Gantner, Henk Neven, Henk van Heijnsbergen, Gerd Grochowski and Burkhard Fritz. Live transmission: Radio 4 (AVRO / NPS / TROS)

== Recording ==
- Thomas Mohr (Dionysos), Michael Burt (Teiresias), Harald Stamm (Kadmos), Roberta Alexander (Königin Agave), Claudia Barainsky (Ino), Michelle Breedt (Panthea), Hans Aschenbach (Pentheus), Jörg Gottschick (Diener des Pentheus); Rundfunkchor Berlin, Deutsches Symphonie-Orchester Berlin, conducted by Gerd Albrecht, January 2001. Orfeo – Musica Rediviva (C136002H)
