= Die Prinzessin Girnara =

Opera by Egon Wellesz, 1921

- Opera by Egon Wellesz
- Librettist: Jakob Wassermann
- Language: German
- Based on: Wassermann's Die Prinzessin Girnara: Weltspiel und Legende
- Premiere: 14 May 1921: Oper Frankfurt; Opernhaus Hannover

Die Prinzessin Girnara (The Princess Girnara), Op. 27, is an opera in two acts by Egon Wellesz to a libretto by Jakob Wassermann which he based on his own text. It was the composer's first opera. The world premiere was performed on 14 May 1921 simultaneously at the Oper Frankfurt and the Opernhaus Hannover. A revised version was first performed at the Nationaltheater Mannheim in 1928.

== History ==
Egon Wellesz was prompted to compose his first opera by listening to a reading by Jakob Wassermann from his then unpublished Die Prinzessin Girnara: Weltspiel und Legende in summer 1918. Based on an Indian legend, it was a play not intended for the stage, but to be read. It was published by Ed. Strache in Warnsdorf in 1919, as the conclusion of his novel Christian Wahnschaffe.

Wassermann supplied a libretto, which Wellesz described as two scenes to be played in parallel: a Weltspiel (world play) and a legend. The work was conceived as undramatic. Wellesz worked on the composition from 1918 to 1919. The opera was called a Mysterium in 2 Akten, a mystery play in two acts.

The opera was published by Universal Edition in 1920. The duration is given as 120 minutes. The world premiere was on 14 May 1921 simultaneously at the Oper Frankfurt, conducted by Eugen Szenkar, and at the Opernhaus Hannover. A revised version was first performed at the Nationaltheater Mannheim in 1928.

== Roles ==
The leading roles and voice types are as follows, with performers of the Hannover premiere, conducted by Richard Lert, and of a revised version at the Nationaltheater Mannheim in 1928.

Roles, voive types, premiere casts
Role	Voice type	Performers Hannover	Performers Mannheim
Buddha	baritone		
The King	bass		
Princess Girnara	soprano	Luise Schmidt	Gertrud Bindernagel
Prince Siho	tenor		Adolf Loeltgen
Magier	bass		
Three demons	tenor, baritone, bass		
several small roles and chorus	Boys' choir, SATB		
