= Only You (Viktoria Modesta song) =

Single by Viktoria Modesta
- Released: 13 May 2012
- Length: 3:56
- Label: Independent
- Songwriter(s): Viktoria Modesta; Nik Hodges
- Producer(s): Mr Jones

Viktoria Modesta singles chronology
"Only You" (2012)	"Prototype" (2014)

"Only You" is a song by British singer Viktoria Modesta. The song was written by Modesta and Nik Hodges and was produced Mr Jones. It was released on 13 May 2012 as the debut single. A music video was directed by Thomas Knights.

== Track listings and formats ==
Digital download

1. "Only You" – 3:56

== Music video ==
The video for "Only You" was shot at the 33 Portland Place, directed by Thomas Knights and styled by Karl Willet.

== Critical reception ==
"Only You" received generally positive reviews from music critics. "The voice and raw sexual chemistry of the most seductive of sirens emerging from London's undercurrent of musical genius." - QX Magazine. "Slick production led pop fronted by an artist already boasting a healthy following." - Music Week.
