= Die Opferung des Gefangenen =

1926 opera-ballet by Egon Wellesz

Die Opferung des Gefangenen (The Sacrifice of the Prisoner) is a 1926 opera-ballet by Egon Wellesz based on a scenario by Eduard Stucken after the Mayan play Rabinal Achi which relates through drama and dance the story of conflict between Quiché and Rabinal in the early fifteenth century. The premiere was 2 April 1926, Cologne under the baton of Eugen Szenkar.

== Recording ==
- The field commander - Wolfgang Koch, Prince's shield bearer - Robert Brooks, head of the council - Ivan Urbas, Hoe-Seung Hwang, Patricia Dewey, Wiener Konzertchor, ORF Radio-Symphonieorchester Wien, Friedrich Cerha Live recording 1995, issued Capriccio 2020
