= Rose Pauly (singer) =

Rose Pauly (sometimes Pauly-Dresden, born Rose Pollak; 15 March 1894 – 14 December 1975) was a Hungarian dramatic soprano.

== Life and career ==
A native of Allodial Ellgoth, Pauly studied in Vienna with Rosa Papier-Paumgartner, and during the 1917–18 season made her debut in Hamburg in a minor role in Martha. She next went to Gera and Karlsruhe before singing the title role in the German premiere of Káťa Kabanová in Cologne in 1922.

1923 saw her appear at the Vienna Staatsoper, where she would go on to sing Sieglinde, the Empress, and Rachel, and where in 1931 she created the role of Agave in Die Bakchantinnen by Egon Wellesz.

From 1927-31 she was on the roster of the Kroll Oper, and she won acclaim for her performances at the Berlin Staatsoper in the roles of Marie in Wozzeck and the title roles in Jenůfa and Elektra. In 1933 she appeared in Salzburg as the Dyer's Wife; the following year she returned in Elektra in the title role, which she would debut at the Royal Opera House, in 1938, and at the Metropolitan Opera. Pauly made few recordings during her career.

== Death ==
Rose Pauly died in Kfar Shmaryahu, near Tel Aviv, aged 81.
