= Michael Breidenbruecker =

Austrian entrepreneur (born 1972)

Michael Breidenbrücker
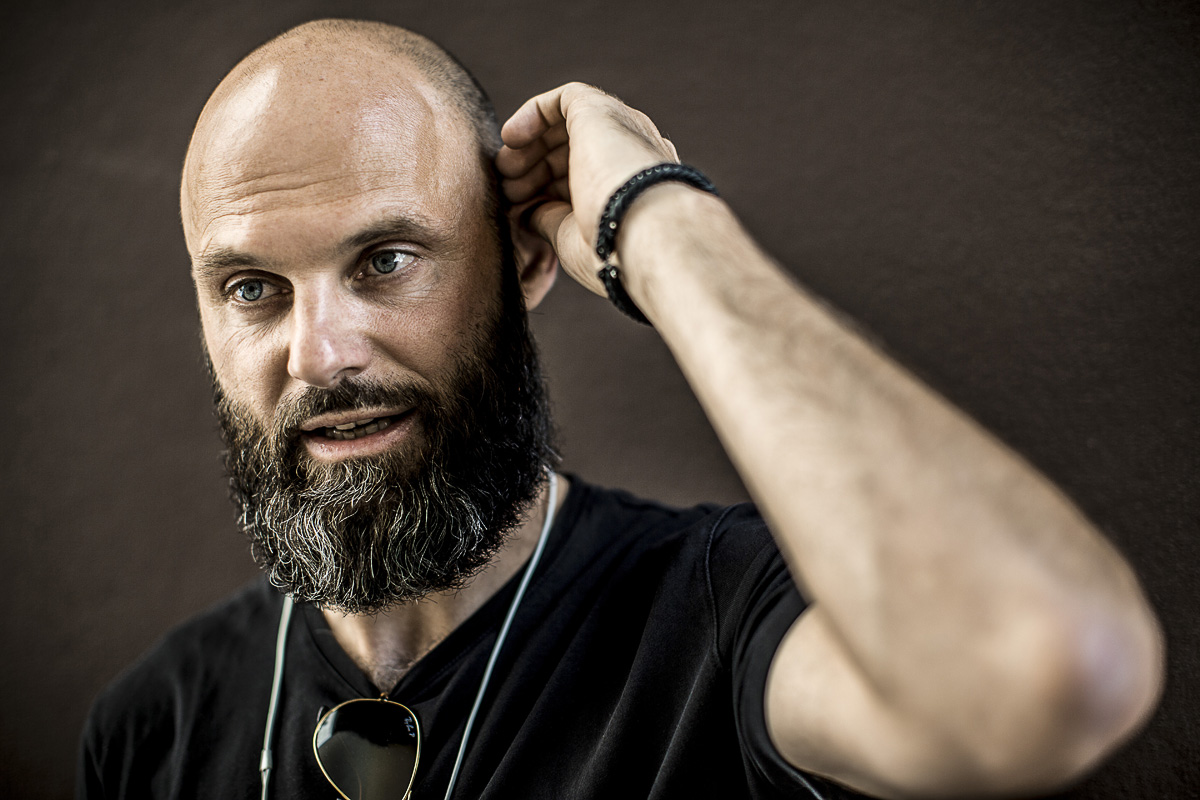
- Breidenbrücker in 2014
- Born: 6 January 1972 (age 54); Vorarlberg, Austria
- Education: University of Applied Arts Vienna
- Occupation: Entrepreneur

Michael Breidenbrücker (born 6 January 1972) is an Austrian entrepreneur, technologist and artist whose work has spanned three technology cycles from the late 1990s. He is best known as co-founder of Last.fm, founder of RjDj, Founding General Partner of 3-A.vc, and co-founder of Raidical.one. He has worked with musical artists such as Hans Zimmer, Imogen Heap, Air and Booka Shade. In 2011 he produced Inception The App with Christopher Nolan and Hans Zimmer, which reached number 5 in the US App Store charts.

== Business ventures ==
=== Last.fm ===
In 2002, Breidenbrücker co-founded the Internet radio site for streaming music Last.fm Ltd. and managed it as CEO from 2002 until 2005. Using a recommend system called Audioscrobbler, Last.fm records users' different musical tastes and makes recommendations. The site also offers different social networking features, allowing users to share their tastes. In May 2007, the company was acquired by CBS Interactive for US$280 million (UK£140 million). In 2003, Last.fm received an Honorary Mention in the Prix Ars Electronica in the category Net vision.

=== RjDj ===
In 2008, he founded RjDj (Reality Jockey Ltd.), a London-based music technology startup pioneering augmented sound and reactive music. RjDj produced and distributed a network of mobile applications that composed real-time ambient soundtracks based on the listener's environment. Writing for Wired in 2009, author and futurist Bruce Sterling described RjDj as "augmented sound design, under-rated", adding: "Maybe someday 'silent augmentation' will be classified like silent cinema."

Mobile applications created with RjDj:

- RjDj App
- Trippy Replay
- Rj Voyager
- Inception The App
- Dimensions The Game
- Situ
- The Dark Knight Rises Z+

RjDj ceased trading in 2013. In 2016, a revised edition of the RjDj App was released under the name "Hear", which reached the top 10 in the App Store Health & Fitness charts.

=== Speedinvest ===
In 2011, Breidenbrücker joined the founding team of the Vienna-based venture firm Speedinvest, initially serving on the investment committee. In 2015, he became General Partner and founded Speedinvest Studio, a company builder based in Dornbirn, Austria, developing digital startups in partnership with corporate partners across traditional industries. The studio operated until 2025.

=== 3-A and Raidical ===
In 2026, Breidenbrücker co-founded 3-A.vc, an early-stage venture fund based in London, and Raidical.one, pioneering the concept of lean exits, which also operates Raidical.academy.

== Life ==
Breidenbrücker was born in Vorarlberg, Austria. After high school he studied engineering in Austria and worked on microgravity experiments in Sweden with Saab Space. He then studied digital art at the University of Applied Arts Vienna under Peter Weibel. He subsequently moved to London, where between 2000 and 2002 he headed the masters programme in interactive digital media at Ravensbourne College of Design and Communication.
