= Shimrit Perkol-Finkel =

Israeli marine biologist

- שמרית פרקול-פינקל
- Born: 12 April 1975; Tel Aviv, Israel
- Died: 7 March 2021 (aged 45); Tel Aviv, Israel
- Education: Tel Aviv University; University of Bologna
- Children: 3
- Scientific career
- Fields: Marine Biology • Ecology
- Doctoral advisor: Professor Yehuda (Hudi) Benayahu

Shimrit Perkol-Finkel (Hebrew: שמרית פרקול-פינקל; 12 April 1975 – 7 March 2021) was an Israeli marine biologist. She researched artificial coral reefs and developed ecological concrete products, green construction and CleanTech. She was a co-founder of two companies in the field of marine ecology, and also served as the CEO of one of them, "ECOncrete". Perkol-Finkel authored over 20 scientific articles. Her work was awarded prizes by the United Nations and the European Union. In 2019 she was chosen by "Forbes" as one of the top 50 women-led Startups that are crushing tech. In the same year, the patent she developed, together with her partner Ido Sella, was chosen as one of the 100 best inventions in the world by Time magazine.

== Early life ==
Perkol-Finkel was born and raised in Tel Aviv, to Rachel, a preschool teacher and artist, and to Dov, a bus driver and tour guide. She was the youngest of four daughters, including the translator Sarit Perkol. In her youth she discovered her fondness for the sea, and used to surf and dive at Hilton Beach, and even did her biotope (an Israeli high-school biology program) work there. After graduating from high school, she joined the IDF.

== Education ==
Upon her release from the IDF, she began studying for a bachelor's degree in life sciences at Tel Aviv University. She received her bachelor's degree in 1998 with honors. As part of her master's degree at Tel Aviv University, which she completed with honors in 2001, when she researched artificial coral reefs. The results of her research were published in the international scientific press. She conducted her doctoral thesis "Biological and ecological aspects of artificial reefs" among other places in the southern Sinai Peninsula and the Gulf of Suez, in a project funded by National Geographic. During her doctoral studies at the university, she met a fellow student, Ido Sella, with whom she would in the future establish startup companies.

In 2008, she completed her post-doctorate at the University of Bologna in Italy, which was fully funded by post-doctoral fellowships, as a "Marie Curie Fellow".

== Career ==
=== Research ===
Perkol-Finkel authored over 20 scientific articles and joined marine research expeditions around the world.

In November 1998, she participated in a survey of soft corals (alcyonacea) in Taiwan. In December 1998, she was a research assistant in coral mass spawning experiments in the Orpheus Islands, James Cook University, Australia. In January 1999, she served as a research assistant at the Leigh Marine Laboratory, at the University of Auckland, New Zealand. Between the years 2000-2004 she participated in annual coral reef surveys in Kenya. In September 2000, she participated in a survey of artificial reefs in the south of the Sinai Peninsula, funded by National Geographic. In July 2002 she participated in a tropical marine biology field course in Jamaica. In January 2003 she completed the "Primer v5" training course, in Plymouth, UK. In July 2004 she participated in a soft coral survey in Okinawa, Japan. In December 2004 and February 2005, she participated in a survey of marine invertebrates in the reefs of Tanzania and Eritrea.

=== SeArc ===
In 2010 Perkol-Finkel returned to Israel from Italy and founded "SeArc", a marine ecological consulting company with her colleague and friend, the marine biologist Dr. Ado Sella. "SeArc" is derived from "Seascape Architecture." The company performed marine biological surveys for gas and oil companies.

In 2011, the company initiated a project in which it collaborated with the Biotechnology department of the Faculty of Marine Sciences at the Ruppin Academic Center. The project, which was supported by Nesher Cement Works Israel, and the APK company, tested modern concrete infrastructures that support the environment, and included an experiment in the anchorage of the city Mikhmoret. In the same year, SeArc was chosen to be among the ten candidates for the finals of the international competition "Savannah's Ocean Challenge". The company's solution was the development of environmentally supportive coastal infrastructures, combining scientific knowledge with applicable concrete technologies.

=== ECOncrete ===
In 2012, together with Sella, she founded the "ECOncrete" company, which developed a new concrete technology for building marine infrastructure that provides ecological benefits to the marine environment. Perkol-Finkel, who specialized in the sustainable management of urban marine habitats, served as the company's CEO. After hurricane Sandy that hit the East Coast of the United States, the company developed significantly. It was commissioned to restore the beach and build ecological breakwaters in Staten Island for the amount of 60 million dollars. The company designed the breakwaters and produced models for choosing their location. The development was done using an ecological method that supports the natural environment and protects the habitats of animal populations that exist on the coast. This is, among other things, through the company's ecological concrete, which encourages the restoration of the natural oyster population, which reinforces the breakwaters. In 2021, ECOncrete doubled its income for the third year in a row, raised capital and won grants from EU Horizon 2020, the BIRD Foundation and the United States Department of Energy.

The company achieved worldwide recognition. In 2015 Perkol-Finkel won first place in a global competition for innovation and young entrepreneurship in science and technology organized by the "Pudong Committee for Young Innovation" in Shanghai. In 2015, the Israeli "8200 Alumni Association" awarded it the title "Startup of the Year". In 2019, the business magazine "Fast Company" named it among the 50 most innovative companies in the world. Its development won the Biomimicry Institute's Hope Fund Award for 2020.

=== Additional projects ===
During the last decade of her life, Perkol-Finkel led several large-scale, long-term projects, such as the EU-funded MarUrbe project in Italy, and a waterfront improvement program in Brooklyn Bridge Park, New York. She was one of the consultants for Waterfront Alliance's Waterfront Edge Design Guidelines program and involved in the ecological design of the SCAPE federally funded project of Living Breakwaters, the winning rebuilding project by design competition. In 2018, she was part of a policy formulation team for Israel's maritime space in the Mediterranean on behalf of the Israeli Planning Administration.

== Awards and recognition ==
- Marie Curie Fellow Postdoctoral Scholarship in Europe for her studies at the University of Bologna
- The We Empower award from the United Nations (2018) after her inventions fulfilled the Sustainable Development Goals.
- The Innovation Award for Women from the European Union (2019).
- The "Forward Actor of the Year" award of the GreenTec Awards for 2019, for her contribution to the promotion of environmental leadership and innovative solutions to address climate change.
- A patent she developed was chosen by Time magazine as one of the 100 best inventions in the world in 2019.
- Included in the Vital Voices book about the 100 women using their power to empower.
- Chosen as one of the 100 most creative people in business by Fast Company for 2019.
- Won the "Pitch to Rich" award at the Virgin and Calcalist innovation conference chaired by Richard Branson.
- Chosen as one of the top 50 women-led startups that are crushing tech by "Forbes" (2019).

On the Forbes website it was written about her: "Shimrit Perkol-Finkel Was The Inspiring Woman Eco-Engineering Needed". An article by Emanuela Barbiroglio states: "Not only was Perkol-Finkel defying the norm of being a leader within a male-dominated industry, but she also was at the forefront of positive environmental change. With 20 years of experience in the field of marine biology and ecology in over 30 counties, Perkol-Finkel specialized in sustainable management of urban marine habitats and her company is the expression of this effort".

After her death, she was selected with her partner Ido Sella, for the final stage of the European Inventor Award for the year 2022 on behalf of the European Patent Office.

== Personal life ==
In 2003 she married Kobe Finkel, a civil engineer. The center of their lives was in Tel Aviv, although they moved to Mexico for work purposes, and to Italy for study purposes. They had three children.

The field of sustainability was very important to Shimrit in her private life as well. She avoided using single-use utensils, traveled by bicycle and electric scooter to reduce fuel use, and volunteered to clean up tar from the Tel Aviv Promenade.

== Her death ==
Perkol-Finkel was killed on March 7, 2021, when she was hit by a truck while riding an electric scooter in Tel Aviv. The news of her death was broadcast on television channels in Israel and covered in the press around the world, among other things as part of the International Women's Day that followed a day later. After her death, a mass cleaning event was dedicated to her memory of the beaches of Tel Aviv from tar, as part of the Israeli Day of Good Deeds. Her widower, Jacob, participated in the campaign of the State Comptroller of Israel and the Public Complaints Commission Office for the road traffic safety of electric bicycles and electric scooters.

The "Creative Destruction Lab" association has dedicated a scholarship fund in Perkol-Finkel's memory, which supports undergraduate students in science, technology, engineering and mathematics studies at Dalhousie University in Canada.

At the Morris Kahn Marine Research Station of the University of Haifa they named the leek they caught and broadcast "Shimrit", in memory of Perkol-Finkel.

== Selected papers ==
- Perkol-Finkel S. and Benayahu Y. (2004) Community structure of stony and soft corals on vertical unplanned artificial reefs in Eilat ( Red Sea ): comparison to natural reefs. Coral Reefs 23: 195–205.
- Perkol-Finkel S. and Benayahu Y. (2005) Recruitment of benthic organisms onto a planned artificial reef: shifts in community structure one decade post deployment. Marine Environmental Research 59: 79–99.
- Perkol-Finkel S., Shashar N., Barnea O., Ben David-Zaslaw R., Oren U., Reichart T., Yacobovich T., Yahel G., Yahel R., Benayahu Y. (2005) Fouling coral communities of artificial reefs: does age matter? Biofouling 21: 127–140.
- Perkol-Finkel S., Shashar N., Benayahu Y. (2006) Can artificial reefs mimic natural reef communities? The roles of structural features and age. Mar Environ Res 61: 121–135.
- Perkol-Finkel S., Miloh T., Zilman G., Sella I., Benayahu Y. (2006) Floating and fixed artificial reefs: the effect of substratum motion on benthic communities. Mar Ecol Prog Ser 317: 9-20.
- Perkol-Finkel S. and Benayahu Y. (2007) Differential recruitment of corals onto artificial and natural reefs. J Exp Mar Biol Ecol 340: 25–39.
- Perkol-Finkel S., Miloh T., Zilman G., Sella I., Benayahu Y. (2008). Floating and fixed artificial habitats: spatial and temporal patterns of benthic communities in a coral reef environment. Coast Estuar Sci 77: 491–500.
- Perkol-Finkel S. and Benayahu Y. (2009) Differential survivorship of two coral species on artificial and natural reefs. J Exp Mar Biol Ecol 369: 1–7.
