= Guitars – the Museum =

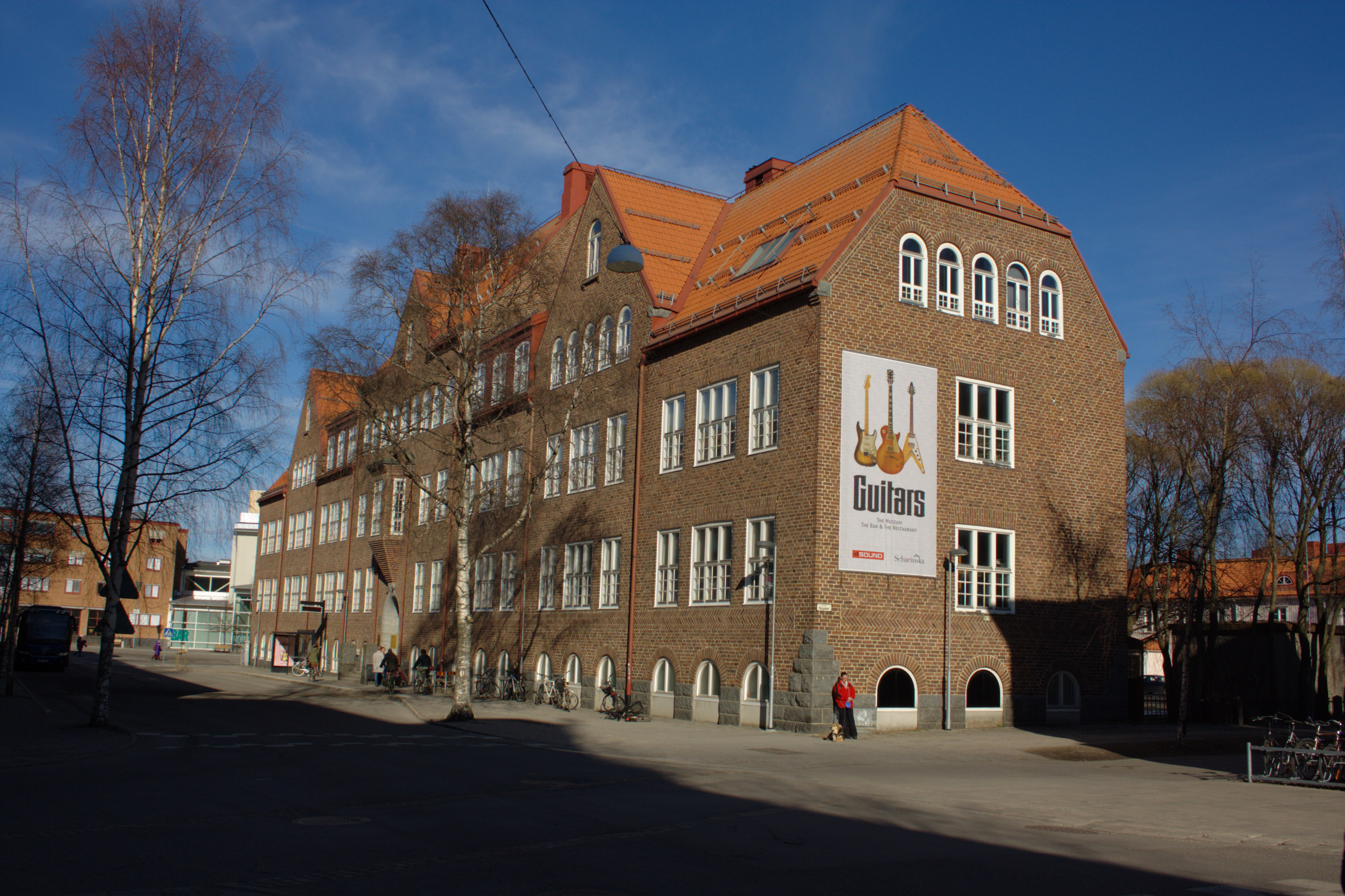
- The museum photographed from Vasagatan in March 2014.
- Established: 2014
- Location: Umeå, Sweden
- Coordinates: 63°49′38″N 20°16′5″E
- Type: Music museum
- Director: Jonas Svedin
- Website: guitarsthemuseum.com

Guitars – the Museum is a museum located in downtown Umeå, Sweden. The museum is located in a brick building that previously hosted the school Vasaskolan. The building dates from 1904. It shares the venue with a rock club, a restaurant, a music store and a record shop. The museum opened in late January 2014, in connection with the inauguration of the European Capital of Culture in Umeå.

The museum is run as a joint venture led by the people behind the music store, 4Sound, and the rock club, Scharinska, (which has retained the name even after the move from Scharinska villan to Vasaskolan), whom also are behind the investments in the guitar museum. Umeå municipality has supported the museum enterprise both through renovation and adaptation of the premises, and with an annual co-funding of 2.4 million Swedish crowns during 2014 and 2015.

== The Collections ==
The museum's collections consist primarily of electric guitars from the 1950s and 1960s, as well as a smaller collection of electric bass guitars, amplifiers and other paraphernalia related to the history of electric guitars. The collection has been gathered by brothers Mikael and Samuel Åhdén, since the 1970s; however, the collection as a whole has not been on public display until the museum was opened.

Among the more exclusive guitars in the collection, there is a 1958 Gibson Flying V, a 1960 Les Paul and a 1950 Fender Broadcaster. With a total of over 500 guitars, the museum has attracted international attention, and has been described as the largest of its kind in the world.

In addition to the museum's own collections there is also room for temporary exhibitions. To mark the opening, the exhibition Umeå - The European capital of hardcore 1989-2000 by Folkrörelsearkivet (the archive of popular movement) was displayed in the museum.

== See also ==
- List of music museums
