= Egon Wellesz =

Austrian-British composer (1885–1974)

Egon Wellesz CBE
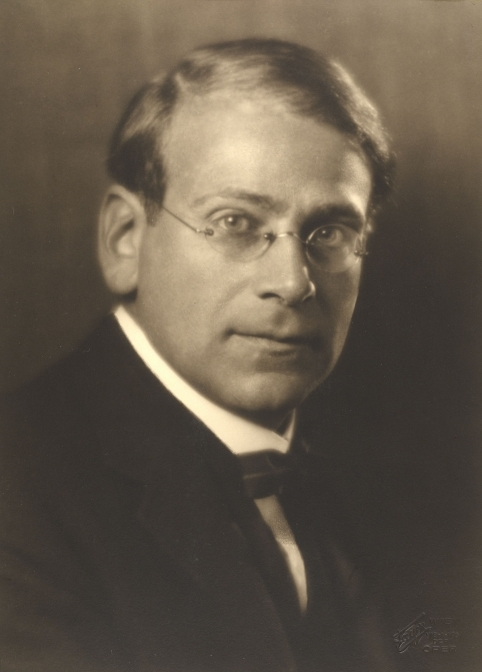
- Born: 21 October 1885; Vienna, Austria-Hungary
- Died: 9 November 1974 (aged 89); Oxford, England, UK
- Education: University of Vienna
- Occupations: Musicologist; composer; professor
- Organization: Lincoln College, Oxford

Egon Joseph Wellesz, CBE, FBA (21 October 1885 – 9 November 1974) was an Austrian, later British composer, teacher and musicologist, notable particularly in the field of Byzantine music.

== Early life and education in Vienna ==
Egon Joseph Wellesz was born on 21 October 1885 in the Schottengasse district of Vienna to Samu Wellesz and Ilona Wellesz (née Lövényi). Although his parents met and married in Vienna, they both originated from Hungary and were Jewish. Egon Wellesz formally left the Jewish community on October 4, 1917 and converted to Protestantism in 10 days, on October 14, 1917 (his wife Emmy did so a year earlier), and in 1933 both he and his wife converted to Catholicism. As a boy he attended the Franz-Joseph-Gymnasium on Hegel Street where he received a classical education in Greek and Latin.

Wellesz's father worked in the textile business and his parents initially intended Wellesz to join him in his work, or pursue a career as a civil servant. In order to achieve that aim, his parents were intent upon Wellesz pursuing an education in law. Accordingly, Wellesz entered the University of Vienna as a law student following the completion of his studies at the Franz-Joseph-Gymnasium. However, Wellesz's own career ambitions had been bent towards music for several years prior to his entrance to the University of Vienna. This desire to pursue a music career had been formed after attending a performance of Carl Maria von Weber's Der Freischütz under the baton of Gustav Mahler at the Vienna State Opera on October 21, 1898; a present from his parents on his 13th birthday. This opera so moved Wellesz that he decided he wanted to become a composer. Prior to this experience, Wellesz had already had some excellent music education as a boy, as his mother was a music enthusiast and amateur pianist who encouraged music studies as a hobby. He began his initial music training at a young age studying the piano with his mother's teacher, Carl Frühling.

In 1905, at the age of 19, Wellesz began studying harmony and counterpoint at Eugenie Schwarzwald's school with Arnold Schoenberg while simultaneously attending law classes at the university. Schwarzwald's school became an important part of not only his musical development but also his social life. There he became the conductor of a school choir and he met and befriended the poet Rainer Maria Rilke, the architect Adolf Loos, and the painter Oskar Kokoschka; the latter of whom painted his portrait in 1911. He also met his future wife, Emmy Stross, who was a student at that school. Wellesz's lessons with Schoenberg took place at Schoenberg's Liechtensteinstrasse apartment where he received a thorough and rigorous training in the fundamentals of music. These lessons, however, lasted only a matter of months, and ended when he began studies in musicology with Guido Adler at the University of Vienna later in 1905. Adler had founded the Musicological Institute at the University of Vienna and was a leading editor of the Austrian Denkmäler der Tonkunst in Österreich. He and Schoenberg's dual influences shaped much of Wellesz's musical and scholarly thought. His 1921 book on Schoenberg is still a standard source on Schoenberg's early period.

== Work as a scholar, lecturer, and composer in Vienna ==
The main focus of Wellesz's early musicological research was Baroque opera; particularly those by composer Giuseppe Bonno who was the subject of his dissertation at the University of Vienna. He also edited Johann Joseph Fux's 1723 opera Costanza e fortezza for publication in Adler's Denkmäler. Many years later Wellesz published a monograph on Fux in 1965. He graduated from the University of Vienna with a degree in musicology in 1908, and his dissertation on Bonno was published the following year. He married Emmy Stross in 1908, and had a very long and happy marriage.

In 1913 Wellesz joined the faculty of the University of Vienna as a lecturer in music history. That same year he embarked upon what would become a lifelong interest in the musical achievements of Byzantium. This interest initially arose from dialogues and debates with the Austrian art historian Josef Strzygowski who at this time was putting forward a new theory that many of the elements of Early Christian architecture, such as the rounded dome, originated not in the West but in the East; ideas published in his Orient oder Rom. Wellesz had plenty of opportunity to discuss these theories directly with Strzygowski as his wife Emmy was an art historian who specialized in the art of India and was a disciple and close friend of Strzygowski. These discussions awoke an interest in him to study the early roots of Christianity and compare the development of chant in the East and the West.

1913 was also the first year one of Wellesz's compositions was publicly performed. The five-movement String Quartet No. 1, Op. 14, received its premiere on 31 October, showing the clear influence of Mahler and Schoenberg. Wellesz was the first pupil of Schoenberg to gain independent success as a composer, receiving a contract from Universal Edition before Berg or Webern. Three further string quartets followed during the war years, establishing his preference for linear chromaticism, and some of them explicitly categorised as atonal. However, it was with dramatic music that Wellesz really made his mark, starting with the ballet Das Wunder der Diana in 1914. In the following 12 years he completed five operas and three ballets, many of the libretti and ballet scenarios written by the important literary figures Hugo von Hofmannsthal and Jakob Wassermann. Operas such as Alkestis (1924) and Die Bakchantinnen (1931) take their subject matter from ancient mythology and, in contrast to the Wagnerian tradition, use techniques such as dance pantomime and coloratura singing derived from Claudio Monteverdi and Christoph Willibald Gluck.

In 1922 Wellesz, along with Rudolph Reti and others, founded the Internationale Gesellschaft für Neue Musik (IGNM) following the Internationale Kammermusikaufführungen Salzburg, a festival of modern chamber music held as part of the Salzburg Festival. This soon evolved into the International Society for Contemporary Music, founded in 1923 with its headquarters in London. The Cambridge academic Edward J. Dent, whom Wellesz had met on his first trip to London in 1906, was elected as its president.

In 1929 Wellesz was promoted from lecturer to professor at the University of Vienna; succeeding Adler in his position at the university. He remained in that post until the events of the Anschluss on 13 March 1938 made it no longer safe for him to reside in Austria.

== Life in England ==
In 1938 Wellesz was forced to leave Austria in the wake of the Anschluss (annexation by Nazi Germany). By good fortune he was in Amsterdam on 12 March 1938 to hear his orchestral suite Prosperos Beschwörungen ("Prospero's Invocation", after The Tempest) conducted by Bruno Walter. Once in England he worked for a time on Grove's Dictionary of Music, but in July 1940 he was interned as an enemy alien, ultimately in Hutchinson Camp in the Isle of Man. He gained his release later that year, on 13 October, thanks to intercessions by Ralph Vaughan Williams and H. C. Colles, the long-standing chief music critic of The Times. Following his internment in 1940 Wellesz found himself unable to compose, a creative block eventually broken by the composition of the String Quartet No. 5 (1943–44), the first important work of his English period. His response to the great English poet Gerard Manley Hopkins also helped re-kindle his urge to compose, resulting in his setting of The Leaden and the Golden Echo in 1944.

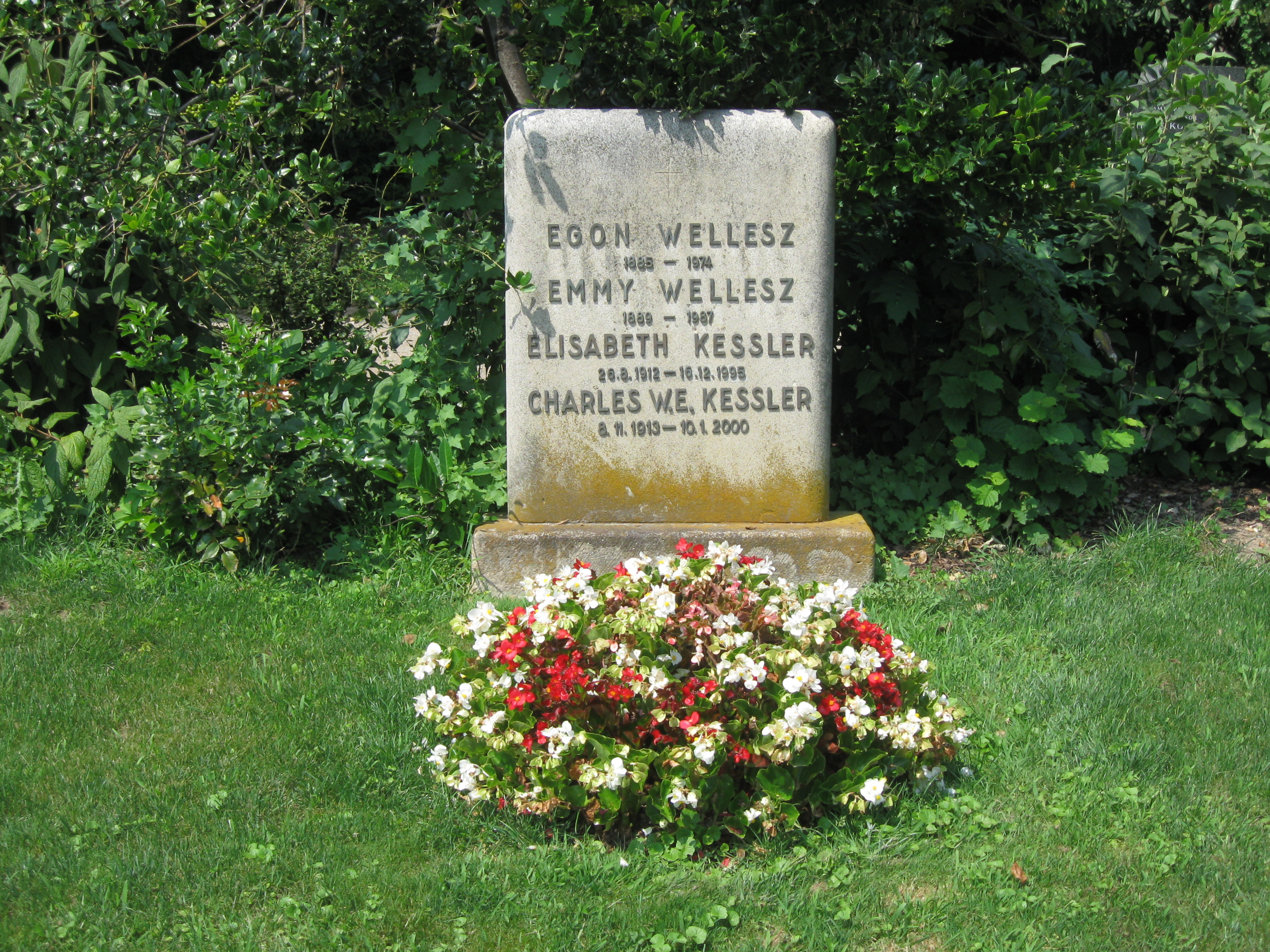
Grave of Egon Wellesz, his wife and other family members at the Zentralfriedhof in Vienna

Despite his composing, Wellesz remains best known as an academic and teacher, and for his extensive scholarly contributions to the study of Byzantine music and opera in the 17th century. These contributions brought for him an honorary doctorate from Oxford University in 1932 and later a fellowship at Lincoln College, Oxford, where he remained until his death. His pupils there included Herbert Chappell, Martin Cooper, Kunihiko Hashimoto, Spike Hughes, Frederick May, Wilfrid Mellers, Nigel Osborne and Peter Sculthorpe. He was elected a Fellow of the British Academy in 1953.

A portrait was made of Wellesz by Jean Cooke, who had been commissioned for the work by Lincoln College. (There is also an early portrait, painted in 1911 by Oskar Kokoschka). Wellesz continued composing until he suffered a stroke in 1972. He died two years later and was buried in the Zentralfriedhof in Vienna. His widow Emmy Stross, whom he married in 1908, returned to live in Vienna until her own death in 1987.

== Music ==
Wellesz composed at least 112 works with opus numbers as well as some 20 without numbers. His large scale dramatic works (including six operas) were mostly completed during his Vienna period (the main exception being the comic opera Incognita, written with the Oxford poet Elizabeth Mackenzie and first staged there in 1952). Robert Layton said Alkestis was "probably his most remarkable achievement for the stage. Its invention is marvellously sustained and organically conceived".

He wrote nine symphonies and nine numbered string quartets, the former starting in 1945 and the latter throughout his life, spanning from 1912 to 1966. Several of his symphonies have titles, including the second (the English), fourth (the Austriaca) and seventh (Contra torrentem). They were generally well received in Austria, Germany and England, but even so the Third Symphony (1950–51) was only published posthumously and only received its world premiere in Vienna in 2000. Other compositions included the Octet, Op. 67 (using Schubert's combination); a piano concerto, Op. 49, a violin concerto, Op. 84; and a number of vocal works with orchestral or chamber accompaniment.

Stylistically his earliest music, somewhat like that of Ernst Krenek, is in a dissonant but recognisably tonal style; there is a definite second period of sorts around the time of the first two symphonies (1940s) in which his music has a somewhat Brucknerian sound – in the symphonies sometimes an equal breadth.

Rather than follow his teacher Schoenberg's Expressionist style, Wellesz found inspiration in music from the pre-modern era (with the exception of Mahler), becoming a forerunner to the anti-Romantic currents of the twenties. As well as the dramatic works, the chamber and orchestral pieces with voice often use these "baroque" elements. An example is the cantata Amor Timido (1933), a favourite of Wilfrid Mellers. Elsewhere, the neo-classical spirit of Hindemith is evident, as in the Piano Concerto (1931) and (still there much later) in the Divertimento (1969).

He wrote:

In place of the infinite melody, the finite must return, in the place of dissolved, amorphous structures, clear, clearly outlined forms. The opera of the future must tie in with the traditions of Baroque opera. This is the natural form, the innermost essence of opera.

=== Recordings ===
A complete recording set of his nine symphonies by the Vienna Radio Symphony Orchestra conducted by Gottfried Rabl is available, and there are recordings of six of the quartets, choral works including the Mass, the violin and piano concertos, and other orchestral works including Prosperos Beschwörungen, Vorfrühling and the Symphonic Epilogue.

- Chamber music: Clarinet Quintet, Op. 81, String Trio, Op. 86, Four Pieces for String Quartet, Op. 103, and Four Pieces for String Trio, Op. 105. Veles Ensemble, Toccata TOCC0617 (2023)
- Choral music and song: Mass in F, Op. 61; Missa Brevis, Op. 89, To Sleep Op. 94. Choir of Christ Church Cathedral, Oxford. Nimbus NI5852 (2011)
- Piano Concerto: with Triptychon, Op. 98; Divertimento, Op. 107; Drei Skizzen, Op. 6; Eklogen, Op. 11. Karl-Andreas Kolly (piano), Luzerner Sinfonieorchester/Howard Griffiths, Pan Classics 510104 (1999)
- Sonata for solo violin, Op. 72. Siân Philipps. Claudio CC6035-2 (2024)
- String quartets: No. 3, 4 and 6. Artis-Quartett Vienna. Nimbus NI 5821 (2008)
- String quartets: No. 2, 5 and 7. aron quartet Vienna. CPO 555617-2 (2025)
- Symphonies No. 1–9 (4-CD Set). Radio Symphonieorchester Wien/Gottfried Rabl, CPO 777183-2 (2009), reissued 2026 as CPO 555 739-2
- 20th Century Portraits': The Dawn of Spring; Sonnets from the Portuguese Op. 52; Song of the World, Op. 54; Life, dream and death Op. 55; Ode to Music, Op. 92; Vision, Op. 99; Symphonic Epilogue, Op. 108. Deutsches Symphonie-Orchester Berlin/Roger Epple, Capriccio 67 077 (2004)
- Violin Concerto: with Prosperos Beschwörungen, Op. 53. Andrea Duka Lowenstein (violin), Radio Symphonie Orchester Wien/Gerd Albrecht, ORFEO C 478 981 (1999)

== Works ==
=== Stage ===
- Das Wunder der Diana, Op. 18 (1914–1917), ballet after Béla Balázs
- Die Prinzessin Girnara, Op. 27 (1919–1920), libretto by Jakob Wassermann
- Persisches Ballett, Op. 30 (1920), ballet after Ellen Tels
- Achilles auf Skyros, Op. 33 (1921), ballet after Hugo von Hofmannsthal
- Alkestis, Op. 35 (1924), libretto by Hugo von Hofmannsthal after Euripides
- Die Nächtlichen: Tanzsinfonien, Op. 37 (1924), Ballet scene after Max Terpis
- Die Opferung des Gefangenen, Op. 40 (1924–1925), Stage drama after Eduard Stucken
- Scherz, List und Rache, Op. 41 (1927), libretto after Johann Wolfgang von Goethe
- Die Bakchantinnen, Op. 44 (1931), libretto by the composer after Euripides, opera in 2 Acts
  - Hymne der Agave aus Die Bakchantinnen, Op. 44, concert edition by Wellesz
- Incognita, Op. 69 (1950), libretto Elizabeth MacKenzie, based on the novel by William Congreve

=== Choral ===
- Drei gemischte Chöre, Op. 43 (1930), text: Angelus Silesius
- Fünf kleine Männerchöre, Op. 46 (1932) from Der fränkische Koran by Ludwig Derleth
- Drei geistliche Chöre, Op. 47 (1932) for men's chorus based on poems from Mitte des Lebens by Rudolf Alexander Schröder
- Zwei Gesänge, Op. 48 (1932) based on poems from Mitte des Lebens by Rudolf Alexander Schröder
- Mass in F minor, Op. 51 (1934). Recorded by the choir of Christ Church, Oxford, 2010
- Quant'è bella Giovinezza, Op. 59 (1937), for women's choir
- Carol, Op. 62a (1944) for women's choir
- Proprium Missae, Laetare, Op. 71 (1953) for choir and organ
- Kleine Messe in G major, Op. 80a (1958) for three similar voices a capella
- Alleluia, Op. 80b (1958) for soprano or tenor solo
- Laus Nocturna, Op. 88 (1962)
- Missa brevis, Op. 89 (1963). Recorded by the choir of Christ Church, Oxford, 2010
- To Sleep, Op. 94 (1965). Recorded by the choir of Christ Church, Oxford, 2010
- Offertorium in Ascensione Domini (1965). Recorded by the choir of Christ Church, Oxford, 2010
- Festliches Präludium, Op. 100 (1966) on a Byzantinium Magnificat for choir and organ

=== Orchestral ===
- Heldensang, Op. 2 (1905), symphonic prologue for large orchestra
- Vorfrühling ('The Dawn of Spring'), Op. 12 (1912), symphonic poem. Recorded by Deutsches Symphonie-Orchester Berlin, 2004
- Suite, Op. 16 (1913), for orchestra
- Mitte des Lebens, Op. 45 (1931–32), cantata for soprano, choir, and orchestra
- Piano Concerto, Op. 49 (1933). Recorded by Berlin Radio Symphony Orchestra, soloist Margarete Babinsky, 2010
- Amor Timido, Op. 50 (1933), aria for soprano and small orchestra, text: Pietro Metastasio
- Prosperos Beschwörungen, Op. 53 (1934–36), five symphonic movements for orchestra after The Tempest. Recorded by Radio Symphonie Orchester Wien/Gerd Albrecht.
- Lied der Welt, Op. 54 (1936–38), for soprano and orchestra. Text: Hugo von Hofmannsthal. Recorded by Deutsches Symphonie-Orchester Berlin, 2004
- Leben, Traum und Tod, Op. 55 (1936–37), for alto and orchestra. Text: Hugo von Hofmannsthal. Recorded by Deutsches Symphonie-Orchester Berlin, 2004
- Schönbüheler Messe in C major, Op. 58 (1937), for choir, orchestra, and organ
- Symphony No. 1, Op. 62 (1945)
- Symphony No. 2, Op. 65 (1947–48), The English
- Symphony No. 3, Op. 68 (1949–51)
- Symphony No. 4, Op. 70 (1951–53), Austriaca
- Symphony No. 5, Op. 75 (1955–56)
- Violin concerto, Op. 84 (1961), dedicated to the violinist Eduard Melkus. Recorded by Andrea Duka Lowenstein in 1999 and David Frühwirth in 2010.
- Four Songs of Return, Op. 85 (1961), for soprano and chamber orchestra, after texts by Elizabeth Mackenzie
- Duineser Elegie, Op. 90 (1963) for soprano, choir, and orchestra after Rainer Maria Rilke
- Ode an die Musik, Op. 92 (1965) for baritone or alto and chamber orchestra, text: Pindar, adapted from Friedrich Hölderlin. Recorded by Deutsches Symphonie-Orchester Berlin, 2004
- Symphony No. 6, Op. 95 (1965)
- Vision for soprano and orchester, Op. 99 (1966), text: Georg Trakl. Recorded by Deutsches Symphonie-Orchester Berlin, 2004
- Mirabile Mysterium, Op. 101 (1967) for soloist, choir, and Orchester
- Symphony No. 7, Op. 102 (1967–68), Contra torrentem
- Canticum Sapientiae, Op. 104 (1968) for baritone, choir, and orchestra after texts from the Old Testament
- Divertimento, Op. 107 (1969), for small orchestra. Recorded by Luzerner Sinfonieorchester/Howard Griffiths, 1999
- Symphonic Epilogue, Op. 108 (1969). Recorded by Deutsches Symphonie-Orchester Berlin, 2004
- Symphony No. 8, Op. 110 (1970)
- Symphony No. 9, Op. 111 (1970–71)

=== Chamber and instrumental ===
- Der Abend, Op. 4 (1909–10), four pieces for piano
- Drei Skizzen, Op. 6 (1911), for piano. Recorded by Karl-Andreas Kolly, 1999
- Eklogen, Op. 11, four pieces for piano. Recorded by Karl-Andreas Kolly, 1999
- String Quartet No. 1, Op. 14 (1912)
- String Quartet No. 2, Op. 20 (1915–16)
- Idyllen, Op. 21 (1917), five pieces for piano after poems by Stefan George
- Geistliches Lied, Op. 23 (1918–19) for singing voice, violin, viola, and piano
- String Quartet No. 3, Op. 25 (1918). Recorded by Artis-Quartett Vienna, 2008
- String Quartet No. 4, Op. 28 (1920). Recorded by Artis-Quartett Vienna, 2008
- Sonata for violoncello solo, Op. 31 (1920)
- Zwei Stücke for clarinet and piano, Op. 34 (1922)
- Sonata for violin solo, Op. 36 (1923)
- Suite for violin and chamber orchestra, Op. 38 (1924)
- Sonnets from the Portuguese for soprano and string quartet or string ensemble, Op. 52 (1934). Recorded by Deutsches Symphonie-Orchester Berlin, 2004
- Suite for violoncello solo, Op. 39 (1924)
- Suite for violin and piano, Op. 56 (1937/1957)
- Suite for flute solo, Op. 57 (1937)
- String quartet No. 5, Op. 60 (1943)
- The Leaden Echo and the Golden Echo, cantata for soprano, clarinet, violoncello, piano, Op. 61 (1944), text: Gerard Manley Hopkins
- String Quartet No. 6, Op. 64 (1946). Recorded by Artis-Quartett Vienna, 2008
- String Quartet No. 7, Op. 66 (1948)
- Octet, Op. 67 (1948–49) for clarinet, bassoon, horn, two violins, viola, violoncello, and contrabass
- Sonata for violin solo, Op. 72 (1953/59)
- Suite, Op. 73 (1954) for flute, oboe, clarinet, horn, and bassoon
- Suite for solo clarinet, Op. 74 (1956)
- Suite for solo oboe, Op. 76 (1956)
- Suite for solo bassoon, Op. 77 (1957)
- Fanfare for solo horn, Op. 78 (1957)
- String Quartet No. 8, Op. 79 (1957). Recorded by Artis-Quartett Vienna, 2008
- Quintet, Op. 81 (1959) for clarinet, 2 violins, viola, and violoncello
- String trio, Op. 86 (1962)
- Rhapsody for viola solo, Op. 87 (1962)
- Musik for string orchestra in one movement, Op. 91 (1964)
- Fünf Miniaturen for violins and piano, Op. 93 (1965)
- Partita in Honor of Johann Sebastian Bach, Op. 96 (1965) for organ
- String Quartet No. 9, Op. 97 (1966)
- Triptychon, Op. 98, three pieces for piano (1966). Recorded by Karl-Andreas Kolly, 1999
- Four Pieces for string quartet, Op. 103 (1968)
- Four Pieces for string trio, Op. 105 (1969, second version 1971)
- Five Studies in Grey, Op. 106, for piano (1969)
- Four Pieces for string quintet, Op. 109 (1970)
- Prelude for viola solo, Op. 112 (1971)

== Decorations and awards ==
- 1953: City of Vienna Prize for Music
- 1957: Commander of the Order of the British Empire
- 1957: Great Silver Medal of the City of Paris
- 1959: Grand Decoration of Honour in Gold for Services to the Republic of Austria
- 1961: Grand Austrian State Prize for Music
- 1961: Order of St. Gregory the Great (Vatican)
- 1971: Foreign Member of the Serbian Academy of Sciences and Arts
- 1971: Austrian Decoration for Science and Art
- 1973: Honorary Member of the Society of Friends of Music in Vienna

== Bibliography ==
- Wellesz, Egon (1925). Arnold Schönberg. Translated by Kerridge, W. H. London: J. M. Dent & Sons. OCLC 23799320.
- — (1960). New Oxford History of Music 1. Ancient and Oriental Music. Oxford: Oxford University Press. OCLC 174194430.
- — (1980) [1949]. A History of Byzantine Music and Hymnography (2nd, reprint ed.). Clarendon Press. ISBN 978-0-19-816111-0. OCLC 3309386.
- — (1965). Fux. London; New York: Oxford University Press. OCLC 302872.
- with Conomos, Dmitri; Velimirović, Miloš (1966). Studies in Eastern Chant. London; New York: Oxford University Press. ISBN 978-0-913836-79-8. OCLC 1126942.

== See also ==
- List of Austrians in music
- List of émigré musicians from Nazi Europe who settled in Britain
