= RjDj =

- Type: Private
- Industry: Video games Computer software
- Founded: London, U.K. (2008)
- Founder: Michael Breidenbruecker
- Headquarters: London, U.K.
- Area served: Worldwide
- Key people: Michael Breidenbruecker (CEO and founder); Robert Thomas (Chief Creative Officer); Christian Haudum (CTO)
- Products: "Inception The App"; "Dark Knight Rises Z+"; "Dimensions The Game"; "Rj Voyager"
- Number of employees: 4
- Website: rjdj.me

RjDj (Reality Jockey Ltd.) was a startup founded in late 2008 by last.fm co-founder Michael Breidenbruecker. The company was based in London and was run by a small team of four employees. Its mission was to create sonic experiences specifically designed for the latest generation of personal music players. RjDj produced and distributed a network of mobile applications and sold additional musical content within this network.

RjDj developed a new genre of music that it called reactive music, a non-linear form of music that was able to react to the listener and their environment in real-time. Reactive music is closely connected to generative music, interactive music, and augmented reality. Similar to music in video games, that is changed by specific events happening in the game, reactive music is affected by events occurring in the real life of the listener. Reactive music adapts to a listener and their environment by using built-in sensors (e.g. camera, microphone, accelerometer, touch-screen and GPS) in mobile media players. The main difference to generative music is that listener's are part of the creative process, co-creating the music with the composer. Reactive music is also able to augment and manipulate the listeners real-world auditory environment.

What is distributed in reactive music is not the music itself, but software that generates the music. Applications made by RjDj were available on Apple’s iOS platform. The technology behind it was based on the Pure Data (or Pd) digital signal processing framework. Reactive music pieces, so called Scenes, could be made using rjlib, which is an open source library of useful software building blocks to construct reactive music.

RjDj closed its website and removed its apps from circulation in 2013.

== Apps Developed ==
- RjDj
- RjDj Shake
- Love by Air
- Inception – The App
- Kids on DSP – reactive minimal techno
- Little Boots – Reactive Remixer
- Dimensions – The Game
- Rj Voyager
- MusicZones
- Trippy
- Dark Night Rises Z+
- The app formerly known as H _ _ r

== Artists who have released music as RjDj apps ==
- ookoi
- Carl Craig
- Little Boots
- Air
- Acid Pauli
- Booka Shade
- Jimmy Edgar
- Chiddy Bang
- Son of Dave
- Kirsty Hawkshaw
- Venus Hum
- Easy Star Allstars
- Sophie Barker
- Kids on DSP
- Hans Zimmer
- Netsky

== YouTube videos ==
- – Dimensions – from the makers of Inception The App
- – Hans Zimmer about Inception The App
- – Inception The App – Sleep Dream Review
- – RjDj Rj Voyager featuring Booka Shade
- – Little Boots Reactive Remixer iPhone app tutorial
