= Jakob Wassermann =

German writer (1873–1934)

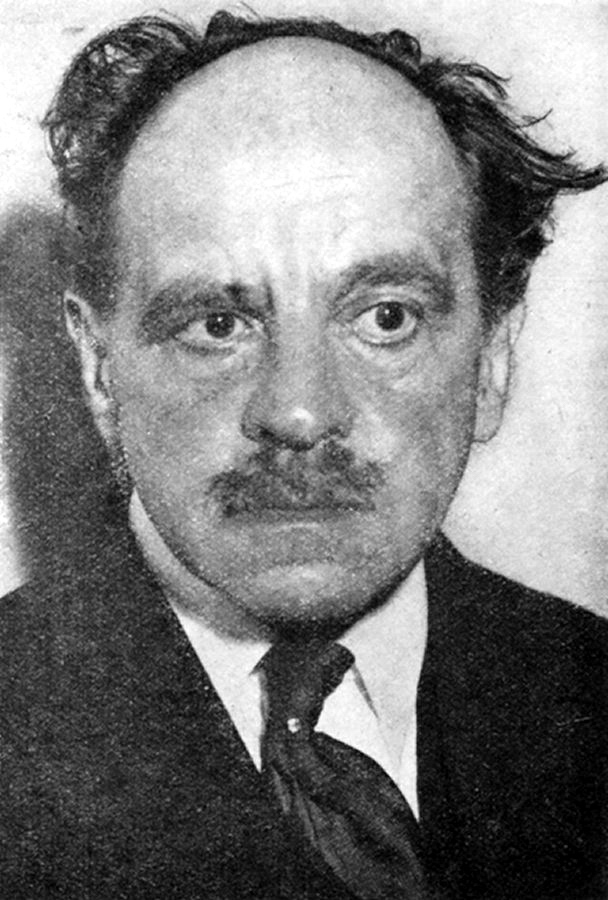
- Born: 10 March 1873; Fürth, Bavaria, German Empire
- Died: 1 January 1934 (aged 60); Altaussee, Austria

Jakob Wassermann (German: [ˈvasɐman]; 10 March 1873 – 1 January 1934) was a German writer and novelist.

Though he was one of the best-selling German-language writers in the early 20th century, his books were banned in Germany following the Nazi seizure of power. Since then, his oeuvre has faded into relative obscurity.

== Life ==
Born into a Jewish family in Fürth (Bavaria), Wassermann was the son of a shopkeeper and lost his mother at an early age. He showed literary interest early and published various pieces in small newspapers. Because his father was reluctant to support his literary ambitions, he began a short-lived apprenticeship with a businessman in Vienna after graduation.

He completed his military service in Würzburg. Afterward, he stayed in southern Germany and in Zürich. In 1894, he moved to Munich where he worked as a secretary and later as a copy editor at the paper Simplicissimus. Around this time he also became acquainted with other writers such as Rainer Maria Rilke, Hugo von Hofmannsthal, and Thomas Mann.

In 1896, he released his first novel, Melusine (his surname means "water-man" in German, while a "Melusine" (or "Melusina") is a figure of European legends and folklore, a feminine spirit of fresh waters in sacred springs and rivers).

From 1898 on he was a theater critic in Vienna. In 1901, he married Julie Speyer, whom he divorced in 1915. Three years later, he married again and wedded Marta Karlweis.

After 1906, he alternated between Vienna and Altaussee in Styria.

In 1926, he was elected to the Prussian Academy of Arts. He resigned in 1933, narrowly avoiding expulsion by the Nazis. In the same year, his books were banned in Germany owing to his Jewish ancestry.

He died on 1 January 1934 at his home in Altaussee of a heart attack.

Wassermann's work includes poetry, essays, novels, and short stories. His most important works are considered the novel The Maurizius Case (Der Fall Maurizius, 1928) and the autobiography, My Life as German and Jew (Mein Weg als Deutscher und Jude, 1921), in which he discussed the tense relationship between his German and Jewish identities.

His 1934 novel originally titled Ganna oder die Wahnwelt (Ganna, or the Mad World), which was part of Joseph Kerkovens dritte Existenz, was translated as My Marriage by Michael Hofmann, who wrote in the afterword to the New York Review Books edition that it "is the true account of Jakob Wassermann's marriage to Julie Speyer of Vienna, with almost nothing omitted or changed". Hofmann adds:

What seems overwhelmingly likely to have been the case is that Wassermann, knowing that he was dying and wanting to put out what was quite obviously the major story of his adult life, but — for reasons of pride [and for other reasons Hofmann suggests] ... 'gave' it to the character of Alexander Herzog.

== Works ==
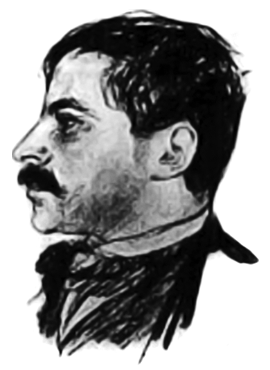
Jakob Wassermann in 1899; drawing by Emil Orlik

- Melusine (Novel, 1896)
- Die Juden von Zirndorf (English title: The Dark Pilgrimage) (Novel, 1897)
- Schläfst du, Mutter? (Novella, 1897)
- Die Geschichte der jungen Renate Fuchs (Novel, 1900)
- Der Moloch (Novel, 1902)
- Der niegeküsste Mund (Stories, 1903)
- Die Kunst der Erzählung (Essay, 1904)
- Alexander von Babylon (Novel, 1905)
- Donna Johanna von Castilien (Narrative, 1906)
- Die Schwestern (Novellas - Donna Johanna von Castilien, Sara Malcolm, Clarissa Mirabel - 1906)
- Caspar Hauser oder Die Trägheit des Herzens (Novel, 1908)
- Die Gefangenen auf der Plassenburg (Narrative, 1909)
- Die Masken Erwin Reiners (1910)
- Der goldene Spiegel (Novella, 1911)
- Geronimo de Aguilar (Story, 1911)
- Faustina (Narrative, 1912)
- Der Mann von vierzig Jahren (Novel, 1913)
- Das Gänsemännchen (Novel, 1915)
- Christian Wahnschaffe (Novel, 1919) (English translation under the title: The World's Illusion)
- Die Prinzessin Girnara, Weltspiel und Legende (Play, 1919, libretto for the Wellesz opera Die Prinzessin Girnara)
- "Golowin" (Novel, 1920)
- Mein Weg als Deutscher und Jude (Autobiography, 1921)
- Imaginäre Brücken (Studies and Essays, 1921)
- Sturreganz (Narrative, 1922)
- Ulrike Woytich (Novel, 1923)
- Faber, oder die verlorenen Jahre (Novel, 1924)
- Laudin und die Seinen (Novel, 1925)
- Das Amulett (Novella, 1926)
- Der Aufruhr um den Junker Ernst (Novella, 1926)
- Das Gold von Caxamalca (Stories, 1928)
- Columbus: Don Quixote of the Seas (Biography, 1929)
- Selbstbetrachtungen (Reflections, 1931)
- Novel trilogy:
  - Der Fall Maurizius (1928).
  - Etzel Andergast (1931).
  - Joseph Kerkhovens dritte Existenz (1934).

== Filmography ==
- Christian Wahnschaffe, directed by Urban Gad (1920, based on the novel Christian Wahnschaffe)
- The Masks of the Devil, directed by Victor Sjöström (1928, based on the novel Die Masken Erwin Reiners)
- On Trial (L'affaire Maurizius), directed by Julien Duvivier (1954, based on the novel Der Fall Maurizius)
- Il caso Maurizius, directed by Anton Giulio Majano (1961, TV miniseries, based on the novel Der Fall Maurizius)
- Der Fall Maurizius, directed by Theodor Kotulla (1981, TV miniseries, based on the novel Der Fall Maurizius)
