= Viktoria Modesta =

British musical artist

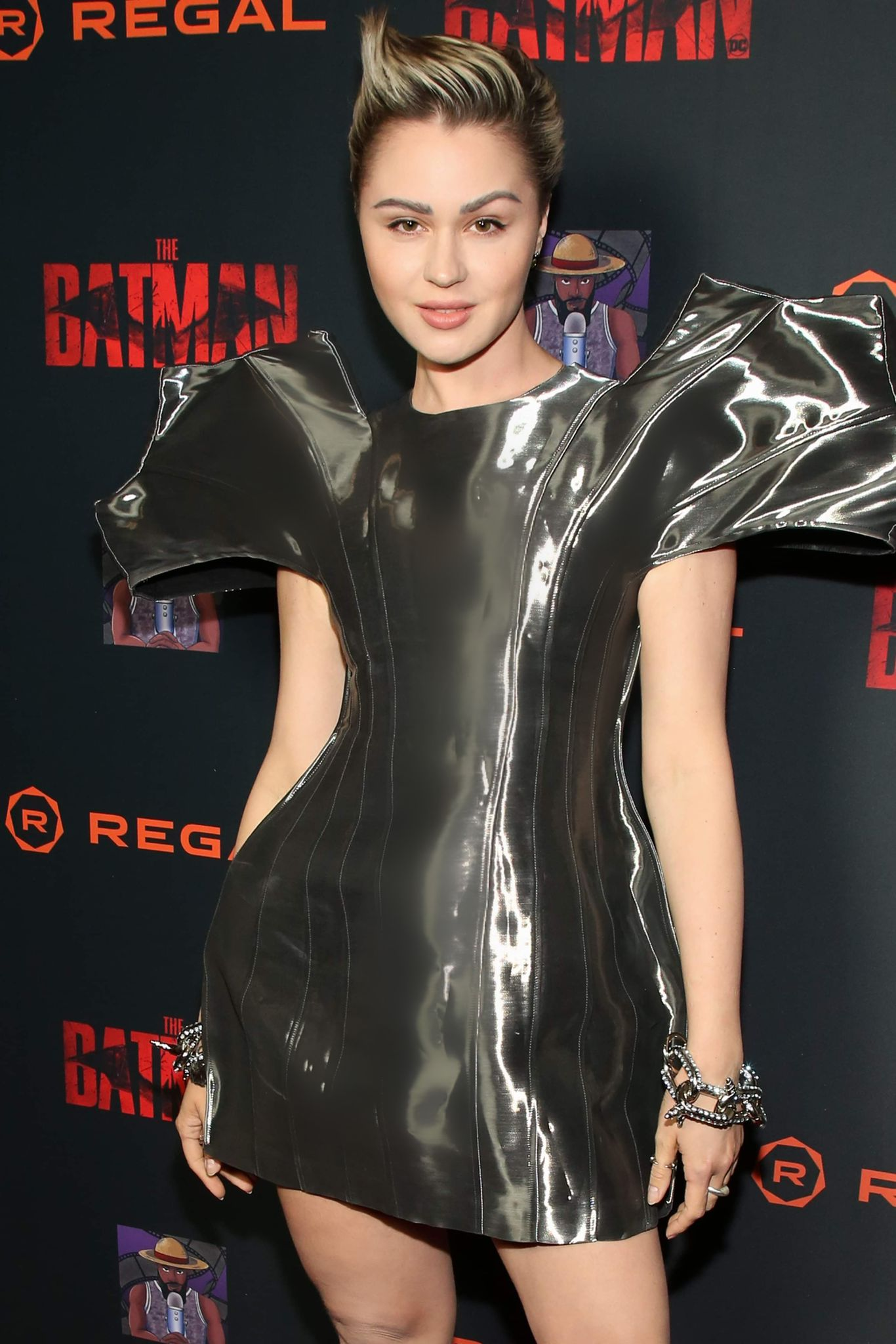
- Modesta in 2022

Background information
- Born: Viktorija Moskaļova; 25 February 1987 (age 39); Daugavpils, Latvian SSR, Soviet Union
- Origin: United Kingdom
- Genres: Electronic, pop, dance
- Occupations: Singer-songwriter, performance artist, model, actress
- Website: www.viktoriamodesta.com

Viktorija Moskaļova (Russian: Виктория Москалёва, romanized: Viktoriya Moskalyova; born 25 February 1987), better known as Viktoria Modesta, is a Latvian-born British singer-songwriter, performance artist, creative director, and model. Modesta's leg was injured during her birth. She had it voluntarily amputated in 2007. She was signed to IMG Models as a model, and as a musician she is also known as a "Bionic Pop Artist". Her music video "Prototype" received a Silver Lion Award at the Cannes Film Festival. She also performed at the 2012 Summer Paralympics closing ceremony and was a guest star at the Crazy Horse in Paris in 2019.

== Early life ==
Viktorija Moskaļova was born in 1987 in Daugapvils, Soviet-occupied Latvia, where she learned singing aged six at a local music school. Moskaļova moved with her family from Latvia to the United Kingdom when she was 12 years old. Due to a doctor's negligence during her birth she was born with problems in her left leg. Her teenage mother was then pressured to send her to an orphanage. She refused and raised Modesta, who spent most of her childhood in and out of hospitals.

== Career ==
=== Modeling ===
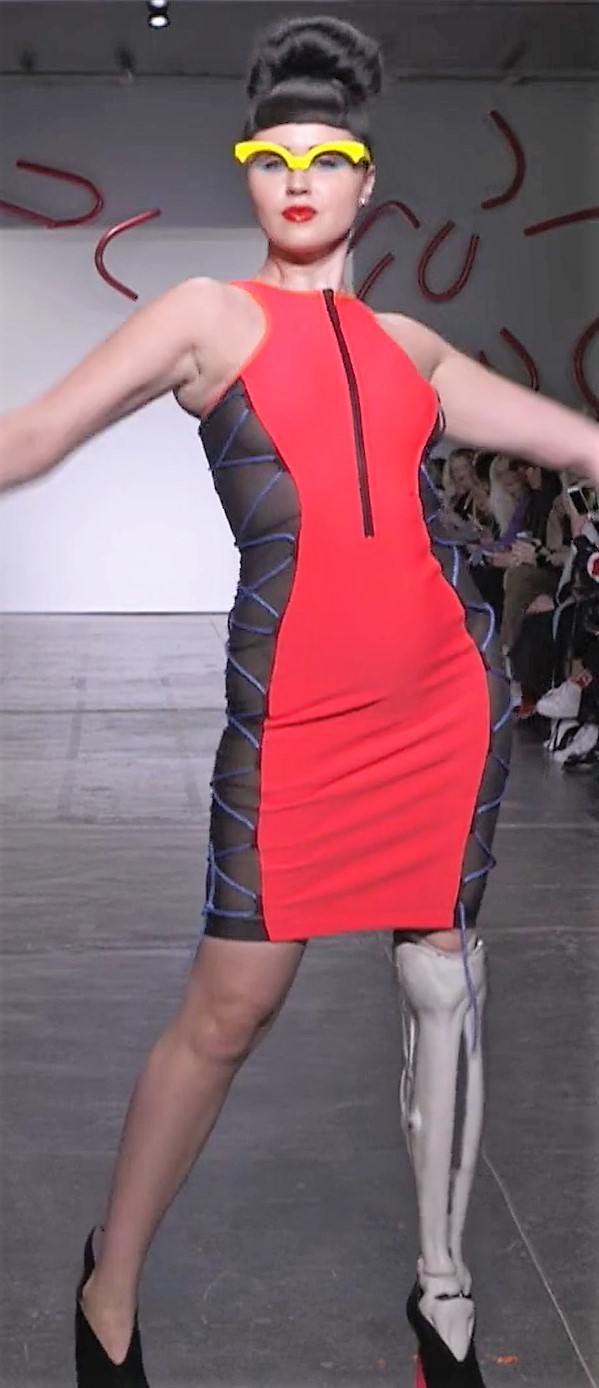
Modesta walks the runway for Chromat Autumn/Winter 2018

Moskaļova began modeling at the age of fifteen. She has appeared on subculture magazine covers such as Bizarre, Skin Two, in addition to appearing in mainstream magazines such as Elle, Vogue, and Harper's Bazaar. As a runway model, she has worked at fashion shows in Milan, London and New York. On 10 January 2015, Moskaļova signed with IMG Models worldwide.

=== Music ===
Moskaļova attended a performance art school from the age of 6 in Daugavpils, Latvia studying piano, vocal performance and sheet music. In 2009, she launched her first musical writing collaborative project with musician/producer Nik Hodges. Her first written track "Jane Bond" was featured in Music Week Playlist. In May 2010, Moskaļova was selected as one of the six best unsigned artists in the UK by Evo Music Rooms presented by Edith Bowman. The show was broadcast on Channel 4. On 19 March 2010, Moskaļova released her first EP titled EP1. On 28 May 2012, Moskaļova put out a digital, independent release of her debut single "Only You". which was featured by i-D, Wonderland and Notion magazines.

On 12 December 2014, she launched a collaboration with Channel 4 for the campaign Born Risky, branding her as the world's first "Bionic Pop Artist" supported by the track "Prototype" released on Spotify for streaming. The video for the campaign was directed by Saam Farahmand. The video has received global attention, with over 12 million views on YouTube as of June 2019 and over 16 million on Channel 4's Facebook page. The story was publicised worldwide throughout news networks publications such as i-D Magazine, Upworthy, Forbes and Elle Magazine USA. The video for "Prototype" received a Silver Lion Award at the Cannes Film Festival. She has also performed at the Music Tech Fest in Berlin in 2016, and the Art Basel Miami in 2017. She also collaborated with the British Council for a performance of Midsummer Night's Dream.

She is a European Young Leader (EYL40) alumni and joined the MIT Media Lab as a Director's Fellow.

=== 2012 Summer Paralympics closing ceremony ===
Moskaļova performed as the 'Snow Queen' to a live performance of "42" by Coldplay at the 2012 Summer Paralympics closing ceremony in London directed by Kim Gavin in a 'Winter' section together with 6 warrior skaters from Dancing On Ice. Her performance wearing a Swarovski crystal-covered prosthetic leg was written about in The Times, Grazia and Look magazines.

=== Crazy Horse Paris ===
In June 2019, Moskaļova starred as "the Bionic Showgirl" in cabaret at the Crazy Horse in Paris. She wore three custom ordered prosthetics for the performance: including a white pinnacle spike and a pinnacle that lit up in different neon colors from the interior. The show was created in tandem with Crazy Horse creative director Andrée Deissenberg and music producer Madeaux. Her show was described as, "Challenging female stereotypes in her powerful performance," adding that she, "literally transforms the human body into art."

=== Collaborations ===
She has collaborated with companies on multi-media projects, including Rolls-Royce in her Black Badge video art film in 2019, and the MIT Media Lab's Hugh Herr. She has also partnered with United Nude for the creation of a high heeled shoe that could house the supporting electronics for Viktoria's prosthetic fitted with tesla coils worn in the Rolls-Royce Art Film, Dutch designer Anouk Wipprecht, designer Sophie de Oliveira Barata, and director Jora Frantzis. In 2016 she collaborated on the Alternative Limb Project, shown at the Boston Museum of Fine Art.

=== Acting ===
In 2017, Moskaļova appeared in the second episode of the third season of the SyFy Network's "Killjoys" as a "Hackmod" named Niko, featuring several of her iconic prosthetic legs. The soundtrack for the episode featured multiple occurrences of Moskaļova's "Prototype" single.

== Personal life ==
In 2007, she had a voluntary below-the-knee leg amputation to improve her mobility and safeguard her future health. She had made the decision at the age of 15, however it took her five years to convince a surgeon to go through with the procedure. Her physicality has become known for challenging the modern perception of altered beauty, and has acted as an advocate for changing public views on the use of augmented body parts.

== Recognition ==
She was recognized as one of the BBC's 100 women of 2016.

== Discography ==
Extended plays

- EP1 (2010)
- Counterflow (2016)
- MOKSHA (2021)

Singles

- "Only You" (2012)
- "Prototype" (2014)
