= Karen Dolva =

Norwegian interaction designer and entrepreneur

Karen Dolva (born 1990) is a Norwegian interaction designer and founder of No Isolation. She was named to the BBC's 100 Women in 2020. She previously studied computer science at the University of Oslo.
