= Musicians without Borders =

International music education organization

Musicians Without Borders
- Founded: 1999
- Founder: Laura Hassler
- Purpose: Conflict Resolution, Peacebuilding; Social Change
- Location: Amsterdam, Netherlands
- Region served: Bosnia-Herzegovina; Palestine; Kosovo; Rwanda; Democratic Republic of the Congo; Jordan; Netherlands
- Website: Official website

Musicians Without Borders (MWB) is an umbrella organization working with local organizations and musicians to bring social change and peaceful, liveable conditions to their own communities. It was founded in 1999 by Laura Hassler, an American peace activist and musician. From their projects and programs, MWB has developed its training program, sharing skills and knowledge with musicians around the world, in support of their continuing work in their local communities.

== History ==
Musicians Without Borders began with music. On May 4, 1999, Laura Hassler conducted a memorial concert in her hometown in the Netherlands. At the height of the Kosovo war, Laura had decided to extend the traditional Dutch remembrance of the second world war to those suffering and dying in the wars raging in Europe at that very moment. The performers dedicated their program of traditional Balkan songs– lullabies, love songs, songs of hope and mourning– to ordinary people everywhere, longing for the same things yet always caught between the firing lines.

Moved by the concert's message, the musicians began talking about using the connecting power of music not only to express the tragedy of war, but also to do something about it. That summer, they visited Kosovo refugees in the Netherlands, singing and playing songs people knew and loved, making music with the children, providing musicians who had lost their instruments with replacements. A few months later, the group was in Sarajevo, Bosnia, performing and running music workshops with children in a refugee camp. In January 2000, they registered as a charitable foundation under the name Musicians Without Borders. Laura coordinated a small office, gradually reaching out to peace and human rights organizations and building a network of musicians, while raising funds and support for a new, innovative approach to peace building through music.

The organization first began organizing exchanges between groups of musicians based in the Netherlands, and later, sending groups to the Balkans to perform music and lead workshops for children. Eventually, the organization moved its focus towards training local people to lead music workshops, gradually expanding to new regions.

MWB has collaborated with musicians and human rights organizations in the Balkans, sending groups of singers and players to perform in festivals, and offering music and dance workshops in schools, cultural centers and refugee camps in Macedonia, Kosovo and Bosnia. As the network grew, MWB organized conferences in Sarajevo and in Utrecht, bringing musicians from eastern and western Europe, the Middle East and Cyprus together to explore their common desire to use their music for peace and social change.

Out of those early contacts grew MWB's first long-term project: the Music Bus, a music project for children in the war-destroyed Srebrenica region in eastern Bosnia. From 2002 to 2011, the Music Bus brought music, dance and theater to children in Srebrenica and the towns and refugee camps in the wide region, while MWB trained local singers and dancers in its growing methodology of inclusive music making.

Gradually, MWB moved from tours and festivals toward long-term, locally based programs. An MWB team, invited to organize a festival in Mitrovica, Kosovo, responded to appeals from local rock musicians, and the Mitrovica Rock School opened in 2008. An invitation to a conference on nonviolence in Bethlehem, Palestine brought MWB to the Middle East. This led to the development of Palestine Community Music, training young Palestinians as community music leaders for children. 2010 saw an expansion to Central Eastern Africa, with the start of Rwanda Youth Music, and in 2013, a collaboration in Northern Ireland led to, Music Bridge. In 2015, MWB launched Welcome Notes, supporting musicians in Europe wanting to respond to the arrival in Europe of people fleeing war. In 2017, a new collaboration brought MWB to El Salvador to work with musicians and educators to help protect children from violence in partnership with UNICEF.

== Programs ==
=== Mitrovica Rock School ===
In post-war Kosovo, Musicians Without Borders created a platform where aspiring young rock stars meet across divides. The Mitrovica Rock School aims to restore the city's shared rock music tradition and to stimulate a culture of respect among youth through music. The school offers daily music lessons and training weeks with students and teachers from both sides of Mitrovica as well as the ‘Remix Band Program’ for ethnically mixed bands. In 2013, the Rock School became an independent organization with its own management.

=== Palestine Community Music ===
Musicians Without Borders offers music-based activities to thousands of marginalized young people in towns and refugee camps located in the West Bank, Palestine, who lack other social or cultural opportunities. Their programs include Music and Nonviolence Leadership training, Rap for Social Change, music workshops for the hearing-impaired and children with special needs. In one such activity, the Musical Playground, MwB organizes musical workshops including dancing, singing, rapping and body percussion. Such activities are aimed to engage and empower children, school staff and families in a festive celebration. MWB works closely with the organization Sounds of Palestine, a community music project inspired and based on the concept of El Sistema in Venezuela., using music education as a medium to achieve long-term social change for the children and families involved as achieved successfully in over 60 countries worldwide.

=== Rwanda Youth Music ===
In Rwanda, MWB works in partnership with the medical organization WE-ACTx For Hope (Women's Equity in Access to Care & Treatment), providing high quality clinical care, psycho-social support, poverty-mitigation, capacity-building and self-advocacy to women and children affected by HIV as a result of the Rwandan genocide. MWB trains WE-ACT youth leaders to use music as a tool for social change, community building, and healing.

Since 2012, international and Rwandan trainers have facilitated the training of 80 Community Music Leaders in Rwanda, each receiving 116 hours of professional training. Rwandan trainers provide on-going support, and ensure local culture is embedded in the training. The most appropriate and effective musical approaches are embedded in WE-ACTx for Hope's clinical support structure, providing young patients with opportunities for positive creative expression and social empowerment through musical interaction.

=== Music Bridge - Northern Ireland ===
The Music Bridge program is run in cooperation with Culturlann Ui Chanain, an Irish language, arts and cultural organization in Derry. MWB provides music workshop leadership training for community workers and musicians interested in developing meaningful projects in their communities with a focus on children and youth from fragile environments, aimed at strengthening self-identity, peer relationships, and creative potential. The project also builds the capacity of local organizations to facilitate cross-community work, making a substantive contribution towards peace-building and reconciliation efforts in the region.

=== Welcome Notes - Europe ===
As refugees arrive in increasing numbers in the Netherlands, Musicians Without Borders is building a program of support and solidarity. Its trainers and workshop leaders use the power of music to engage people living in emergency reception centers, building trust and connection among refugees and local communities.MWB has trained musicians in the Netherlands, Italy and Germany to implement workshops in local refugee centers.

=== Soy Musica (I Am Music) - El Salvador ===
El Salvador is a country that suffered a brutal civil war from 1980 to 1992. Today in El Salvador, many years after ‘peace’ was declared, inequality, fear and violence still prevail. Musicians Without Borders has partnered with UNICEF and the Ministry of Education of El Salvador, as part of a national program to build capacities for teachers in peacebuilding.

== Training ==
MWB trains musicians with experience in community work and/or social activism who are interested in expanding their skills based on their working principles developed from years of working in current and post-conflict regions. They offer an annual 6-day Training of Trainers in The Netherlands, focusing on training musicians to use music for social change and peace-building.

In partnership with various organizations and academic institutes, MWB offers advanced training that cover various aspects of their community music training curriculum:

- MWB offers an annual elective as part of the three-week course “Conflict Transformation Across Cultures” at SIT Graduate Institute, to train musicians and peacebuilders how to integrate music into social outreach for communities affected by war and other forms of violence.

- At the annual SOAS summer music school, MWB runs a training and seminar program open to musicians and music researchers.

== Results ==
Researchers who have studied MWB's work have implied that such intercultural creative music practices can be adapted to further social justice engagement. Today, MWB engages with universities, social activists and artists worldwide: sharing expertise as they work to inspire and enable musicians around the globe to be advocates, activists, teachers, trainers, researchers and performers, together carrying the message: "war divides, music connects."
