= Last.fm =

Music database and statistics website

- Screenshot of the website homepage in June 2026
- Website type: Online music database, music recommendation, events, statistics, social networking service
- Founded: United Kingdom
- Owners: Independent (2002–2007; 2026–present); CBS Interactive (2007–2021); Paramount Streaming (2021–2025); Paramount Skydance (2025–2026)
- Creators: Felix Miller, Martin Stiksel, Michael Breidenbruecker, Thomas Willomitzer, Richard Jones
- Website: last.fm
- Commercial: Yes
- Registration: Free, with optional subscription
- Launched: 20 March 2002; 24 years ago
- Current status: Active

Last.fm is a music website founded in the United Kingdom in 2002. Utilising a music recommender system known as "Audioscrobbler", Last.fm creates a detailed profile of each user's musical preferences by recording the details of the tracks they listen to, whether from Internet radio stations or from the user's computer or portable music devices. This information is transferred ("scrobbled") to Last.fm's database via the music player (such as Spotify and Apple Music) or through a plug-in installed in the user's music player. The data is then displayed on the user's profile page and compiled to create reference pages for individual artists.

On 30 May 2007, it was acquired by CBS Corporation through its streaming division CBS Interactive, which is now part of Skydance Corporation, for £140 million (US$280 million, equivalent to $418,200,000 in 2025). In May 2026, Last.fm announced that it had become an independent company again.

== History ==
=== Audioscrobbler and Last.fm (2002–2006) ===
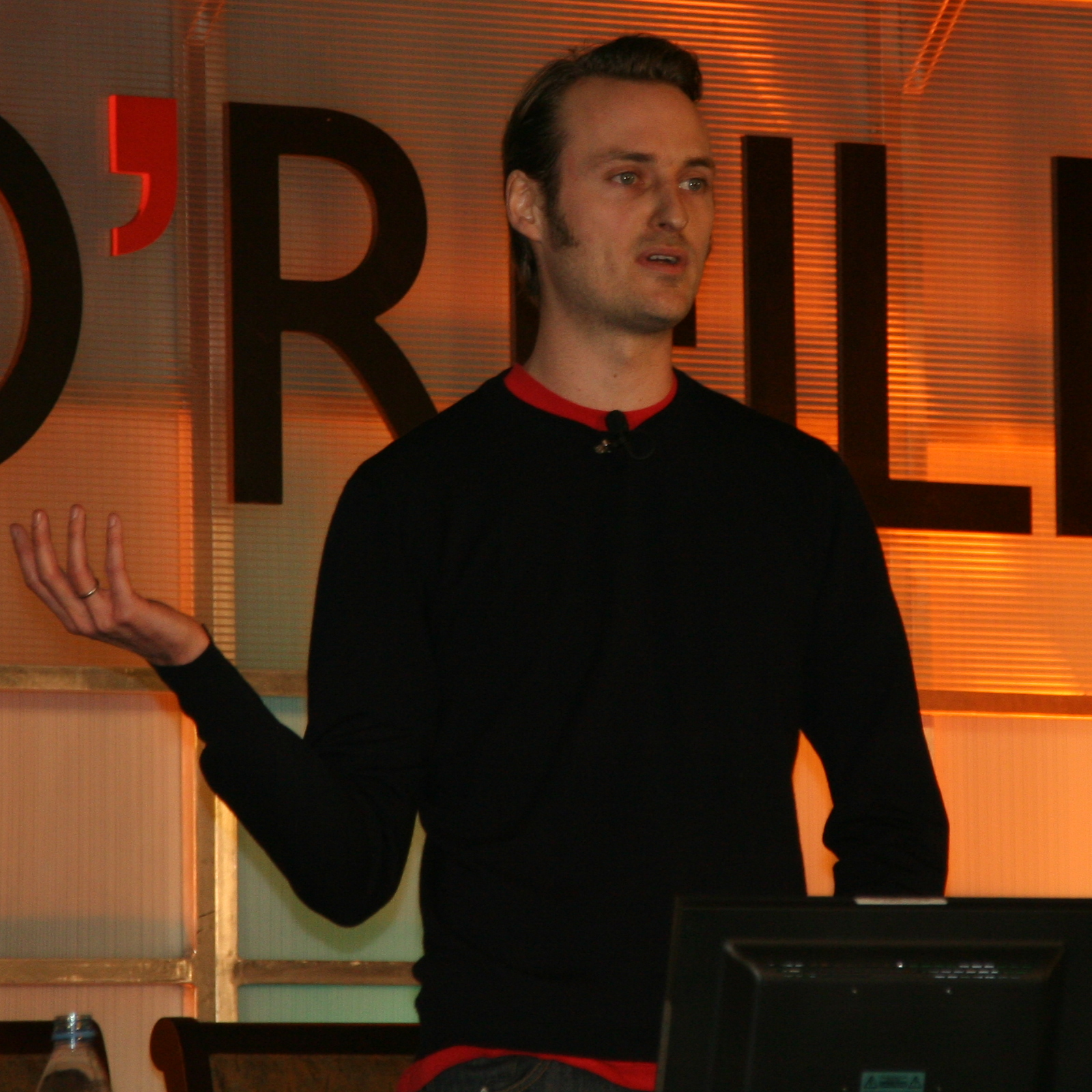
Felix Miller, one of the Last.fm founders

Audioscrobbler began as a computer science project by Richard Jones while he was attending the University of Southampton School of Electronics and Computer Science in the United Kingdom. The website was originally developed as two separate sources: Last.fm and Audioscrobbler, that later merged in 2005. The term scrobbling is defined as the process of finding, processing, and distributing information related to people, music, and other data. Jones developed the first plugins and opened an API to the community, which led to support for many music players across different operating system platforms. Audioscrobbler was initially limited to tracking which songs its users played on registered computers, enabling charting and collaborative filtering.

Last.fm was founded in 2002 by Felix Miller, Martin Stiksel, Michael Breidenbruecker, and Thomas Willomitzer. Initially established as an Internet radio station and music community site, it utilised similar music profiles to generate dynamic playlists. The site's name employs a domain hack using .fm, the top level domain of Micronesia, which is popular among FM radio-related sites. The "love" and "ban" buttons enabled users to gradually customise their profiles. Last.fm won the Europrix in 2002 and was nominated for the Prix Ars Electronica in 2003.

The Audioscrobbler and Last.fm teams began collaborating closely, moving into the same offices in Whitechapel, London. By 2003, Last.fm was fully integrated with Audioscrobbler profiles, allowing input through either an Audioscrobbler plugin or a Last.fm station. The sites also shared numerous community forums, although some were unique to each site. The original Audioscrobbler site at the audioscrobbler.com domain name was entirely merged into the new Last.fm site on 9 August 2005. Audioscrobbler.net was launched as a separate development-oriented site on 5 September 2005.

In 2004, the company received its first round of angel money from Peter Gardner, an investment banker who was introduced to the founders as early as 2002. A second round was led by Stefan Glaenzer, joined by Joi Ito and Reid Hoffman, who also purchased shares from Michael Breidenbruecker. In 2006, the company secured its first round of venture capital funding from European investors Index Ventures, whose General Partners Neil Rimer and Danny Rimer joined Last.fm's board of directors, which included Felix Miller, Martin Stiksel, and Stefan Glaenzer (chair).

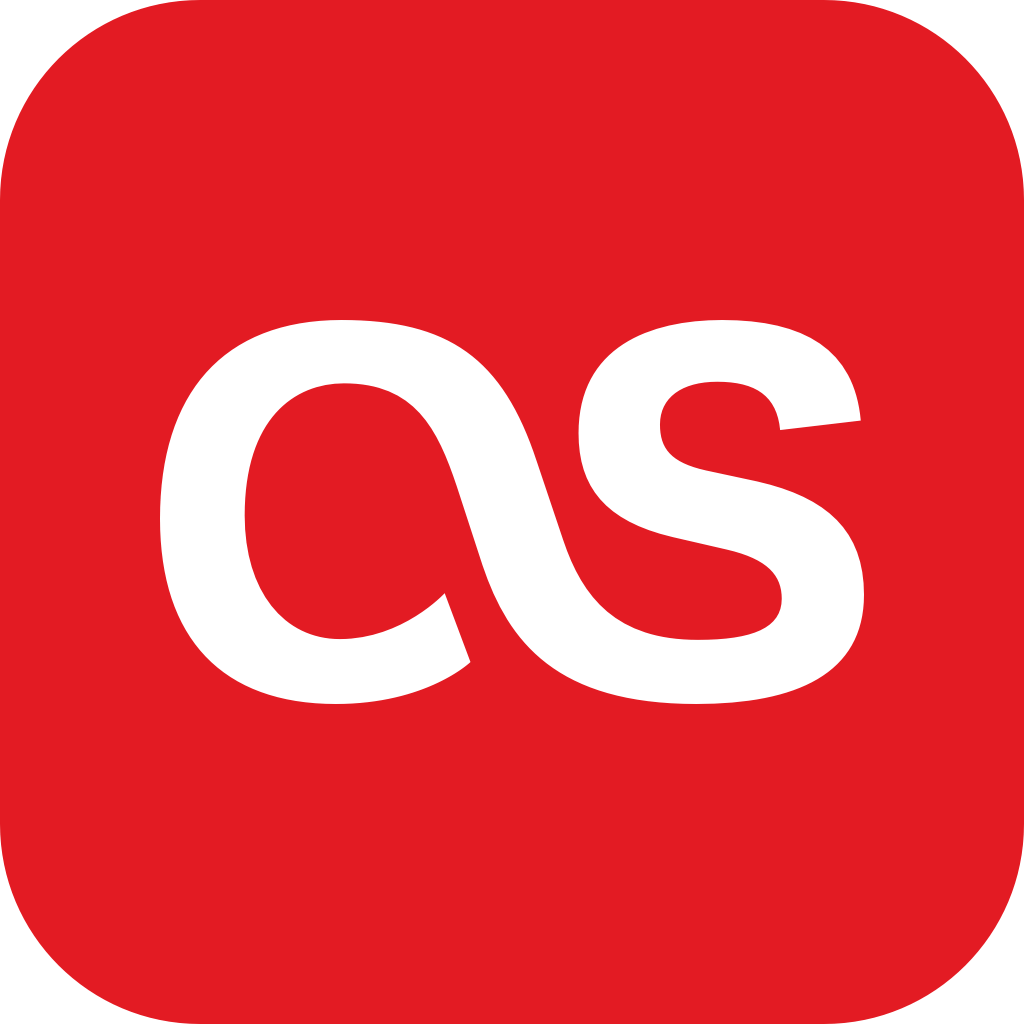
The Last.fm icon

An update to the site was implemented on 14 July 2006, which introduced a new software application for playing Last.fm radio streams and logging tracks played with other media players. Other changes included improvements to the friends system, requiring a two-way friendship, and the addition of the last.fm "Dashboard" where users can view relevant information for their profiles on a single page, expanded options for purchasing music from online retailers, and a new visual design for the website (including an optional black colour scheme).

In late 2006, Last.fm won the award for Best Community Music Site at the BT Digital Music Awards held in October. Last.fm also partnered with EMI on the Tuneglue-Audiomap project. In January 2007, Last.fm was nominated for Best Website at the NME Awards.

=== CBS acquisition and redesign (2007–2009) ===
At the end of April 2007, rumours surfaced regarding negotiations between CBS and Last.fm, indicating that CBS intended to acquire Last.fm for approximately £225 million ($449 million equivalent to $670,700,000 in 2025). In May 2007, it was announced that Channel 4 Radio would broadcast a weekly show called "Worldwide Chart," reflecting the listening habits of Last.fm users worldwide. On 30 May 2007, it was revealed that Last.fm had been acquired by CBS for £140 million, with Last.fm's current management team remaining in place. In July 2008, the "new generation" Last.fm was launched, featuring a completely new layout, color scheme, and several new features, alongside the removal of some old ones. However, this redesign was met with dissatisfaction among some users, who complained about the "unappealing and non-user-friendly layout," bugs, and slow performance. A CBS press release credited the redesign with generating a 20% increase in the site's traffic.

Last.fm debuted Portishead's album Third on 21 April 2008, a week before its release. It was made available for free streaming on the website, attracting 327,000 listeners in 24 hours. It was the first time Last.fm made an album available before its release.

On 22 February 2009, TechCrunch reported that "[the] RIAA asked social music service Last.fm for data about its users' listening habits to find individuals with unreleased tracks on their computers. And Last.fm, which is owned by CBS, allegedly handed the data over to the RIAA." This led to several public statements from both Last.fm and TechCrunch, with Last.fm denying that it had shared any personal data with the RIAA. The request was reportedly prompted by the leak of U2's then-unreleased album No Line on the Horizon and its subsequent widespread distribution through peer-to-peer file sharing services such as BitTorrent.

Three months later, on 22 May 2009, TechCrunch reported that CBS, the parent company of Last.fm, had handed over the data. Last.fm once again denied this allegation, asserting that CBS could not have provided the data without Last.fm's knowledge.

=== Changes to streaming and access on other platforms (2009–2011) ===
On 24 March 2009, Last.fm announced a change in its free streaming policy. According to the blog post, "[...] In the United States, United Kingdom, and Germany, nothing will change. In all other countries, listening to Last.fm Radio will soon require a subscription of €3.00 per month." This change took effect on 22 April 2009. The announcement sparked a wave of disappointment among users, leading to a decline in data submissions, refusal to update signatures or avatars, and even account deletions.

The original founders, Felix Miller, Martin Stiksel, and Richard Jones, left the company in the summer of 2009.

On 11 September 2009, CBS Radio announced that Last.fm programming would be available for the first time on four major-market FM stations via their HD Radio multicasts. This included KCBS-HD2 in Los Angeles, KITS-HD3 in San Francisco, WWFS-HD2 in New York City, and WXRT-HD3 in Chicago. The programming featured music aggregated from Last.fm's user-generated weekly music charts, as well as live performances and interviews from Last.fm studios in New York City, and debuted on 5 October.

In May 2010, Last.fm launched a personalised guide to music festivals, which made recommendations based on a user's listening history. In July 2011, they launched dedicated festival mobile apps for iOS and Android.

The ability to listen to custom radio stations, such as "personal tag radio" and "loved tracks radio," was withdrawn on 17 November 2010. This change provoked an angry response among users. Last.fm stated that the move was due to licensing reasons. The change meant that a tag radio stream would now include all music tagged as such, rather than just that tagged by individual users, effectively broadening the number of tracks that could be streamed under any one tag set.

=== Website and desktop application redesigns (2012–2013) ===
In March 2012, Last.fm was breached by hackers, resulting in the compromise of more than 43 million user accounts. The full extent of the breach, along with its connection to similar attacks against Tumblr, LinkedIn, and Myspace during the same timeframe, was not confirmed until August 2016. The passwords were protected using an outdated, unsalted MD5 hash. Last.fm informed users of the attack in June 2012.

On 14 February 2012, Last.fm announced the launch of a new beta desktop client for public testing. The new scrobbler was subsequently released for all users on 15 January 2013.

On 12 July 2012, Last.fm announced a new website redesign in public beta, inviting user feedback from participants in the testing phase. The redesign officially went live for all users on 2 August 2012.

While technology websites received the redesign positively, many users expressed dissatisfaction with the changes on the website's forum.

On 19 June 2012, Last.fm launched Last.fm Originals, a new website featuring exclusive performances and interviews with various musical artists.

On 13 December 2012, it was announced that Last.fm would discontinue its radio service after January 2013 for subscribers in all countries except the United States, United Kingdom, Germany, Canada, Ireland, Australia, New Zealand, and Brazil. Additionally, radio in the desktop client would require a subscription in the US, UK, and Germany, although the website radio would remain free in those countries.

=== End of radio streaming and redesign (2014–2026) ===
In January 2014, the website announced on-demand integration with Spotify and introduced a new YouTube-powered radio player. With the introduction of the YouTube player, the standard radio service became a subscriber-only feature.

On 26 March 2014, Last.fm announced that it would discontinue its streaming radio service on 28 April 2014. In a statement, the site indicated that the decision was made to "focus on improving scrobbling and recommendations".

On 15 April 2015, Last.fm released a subscriber-exclusive beta version of a new website redesign. Digital Spy described user reactions on the site's forums during the week of the redesign as "universally negative".

In 2016, Music Manager was discontinued, and music uploaded to the site by musicians and record labels became inaccessible. After the integration with Spotify, these tracks could still be played and downloaded where the option was available; however, following the change, artists themselves were unable to access their songs in the Last.fm catalog.

The website experienced a slight revival during the COVID-19 pandemic, beginning in 2020, linked to its popularity within music communities on the communication platform Discord. Last.fm celebrated its twentieth anniversary in 2022. Third-party developers have created programs that integrate users' listening statistical data with Discord, including a popular bot from the Netherlands that has over 400,000 total users.

=== Independence (2026–present) ===
On 27 May 2026, Last.fm announced on its support forum that it was now an independent company, and would keep its same team. The announcement stated that no changes would be made to user accounts or data.

On 25 June 2026, Last.fm implemented a change in daily limit on scrobbles allowed, following complaints of botted listening by accounts. This was criticized by fans of the K-pop group BTS.

== Features ==
=== User accounts ===
The free user account provides access to all the main features listed below. Registered users are also able to send and receive private messages. The newly launched Last.fm Pro user account adds additional features to the free tier, the most notable being the ability to change usernames, edit scrobbles and gain early access to new features.

==== Profile ====
A Last.fm user can build a musical profile using any or all of several methods: by listening to their personal music collection on a music player application on a computer or an iPod with an Audioscrobbler plugin, or by listening to the Last.fm Internet radio service, either through the Last.fm client or the embedded player. All songs played are added to a log from which personal top artist/track bar charts and musical recommendations are calculated.

Last.fm automatically generates a profile page for every user, which includes basic information such as their username, avatar, date of registration, and the total number of tracks played. There is also a Shoutbox for public messages. Profile pages are visible to all, along with a list of top artists and tracks, and the 10 most recently played tracks (which can be expanded). Each user's profile features a 'Taste-o-Meter' that provides a rating of how compatible the user's music taste is.

==== Recommendations ====
Last.fm includes a personal recommendations page that is only visible to the user and lists suggested new music and events, all tailored to the user's preferences. Recommendations are calculated using a collaborative filtering algorithm, allowing users to browse and hear previews of a list of artists not featured on their own profiles but present on those of others with similar musical tastes.

==== Premium features ====
Users can pay £4.99 per month or £49.99 per year to join Last.fm Pro, unlocking features such as monthly and annual reports, browsing past reports, early access to upcoming features, the blast from the past feature, the ability to edit scrobbles, new formatting features, and the ability to edit their username.

== Artist pages ==
Once an artist has had at least one track "scrobbled" by a user, Last.fm automatically generates a main artist page. This page displays details such as the total number of plays, the total number of listeners, the most popular weekly and overall tracks, the top weekly listeners, a list of similar artists, the most popular tags, and a shoutbox for messages. Additionally, there are links to events, albums, and individual track pages, and a similar artists radio. Official music videos and other videos imported from YouTube may also be viewed on the relevant artist and track pages.

Users may contribute relevant biographical details and other information to any artist's main page via a wiki. Edits are regularly moderated to prevent vandalism. A photograph of the artist may also be added. If more than one photograph is submitted, the most popular one is chosen by public vote. User-submitted content is licensed for use under the Creative Commons Attribution Share-Alike License and the GNU Free Documentation License.

Last.fm cannot disambiguate artists with the same name; a single artist profile is shared between valid artists with identical names. Additionally, Last.fm and its users do not differentiate between the composer and the artist of music, which can lead to confusion in classical music genres.

== Charts ==
One notable feature of Last.fm is the semi-automatic weekly generation and archiving of detailed personal music charts and statistics, which contribute to profile building. Users can access several charts, including Top Artists, Top Tracks, and Top Albums. Each of these charts is based on the actual number of listeners for the track, album, or artist, recorded through an Audioscrobbler plugin or Last.fm radio stream.

Additionally, charts are available for the top tracks by each artist in the Last.fm system, as well as the top tracks for individual albums (when the tagging information of the audio file is available). Artist profiles also keep track of a short list of Top Fans, calculated using a formula that reflects an artist's importance in a fan's profile, balancing users who listen to hundreds of tracks with those who listen to only a few.

As the information is largely compiled from ID3 metadata in audio files "scrobbled" from users' own computers, inaccuracies and misspellings can lead to numerous errors in the listings. Tracks with ambiguous punctuation are particularly prone to separate listings, which can dilute the apparent popularity of a track. Artists or bands with the same name are not always differentiated. The system attempts to consolidate different artist tags into a single artist profile and has recently made efforts to harmonise track names.

=== Global charts ===
Last.fm generates weekly "global" charts of the top 400 artists and tracks listened to by all Last.fm users.

The Global Tag Chart displays the 100 most popular tags used to describe artists, albums, and tracks. This is based on the total number of times the tag has been applied by Last.fm users since the tagging system was first introduced and does not necessarily reflect the number of users currently listening to any of the related "global tag radio" stations.

== Radio stations ==
Last.fm previously offered customised virtual "radio stations" consisting of uninterrupted audio streams of individual tracks selected from the music library. This service was discontinued on 28 April 2014.

Stations could be based on the user's personal profile, musical neighbours, or their friends. Additionally, stations could be created based on tags, provided enough music was associated with the same tag. Users could also create stations on the fly, and each artist page allowed the selection of a "similar artists" or "artist fan" radio station. In May 2009, Last.fm introduced Visual Radio, an enhanced version of Last.fm radio. This update brought features such as an artist slideshow and combo stations, which allowed users to listen to stations consisting of common similar artists or up to three artists or three tags.

Under the terms of the station's "radio" license, listeners may not select specific tracks (except as previews) or choose the order in which they are played. However, any track played may be skipped or banned entirely. The appropriate royalties are paid to the copyright holders of all streamed audio tracks in accordance with UK law. The radio stream uses the MP3 format at 128 kbit/s and 44.1 kHz, which can be played using the in-page Flash player or the downloaded Last.fm client. Community-supported players are also available, along with a proxy that lets users use a media player of their choice.

On 24 March 2009, Last.fm announced that access to Last.fm Radio would require a subscription of €3.00 per month for users residing outside the US, UK, and Germany. This change was initially set to take effect on 30 March, but was postponed until 22 April. This decision resulted in over 1,000 comments on the Last.fm blog, most of which were negative.

Last. fm discontinued streaming and radio services on 28 April 2014, allowing the platform to "focus on its core product, the scrobbling experience." Despite the discontinuation of streaming, the website still generates recommendations based on a user's existing library.

=== Player ===
Last.fm Player
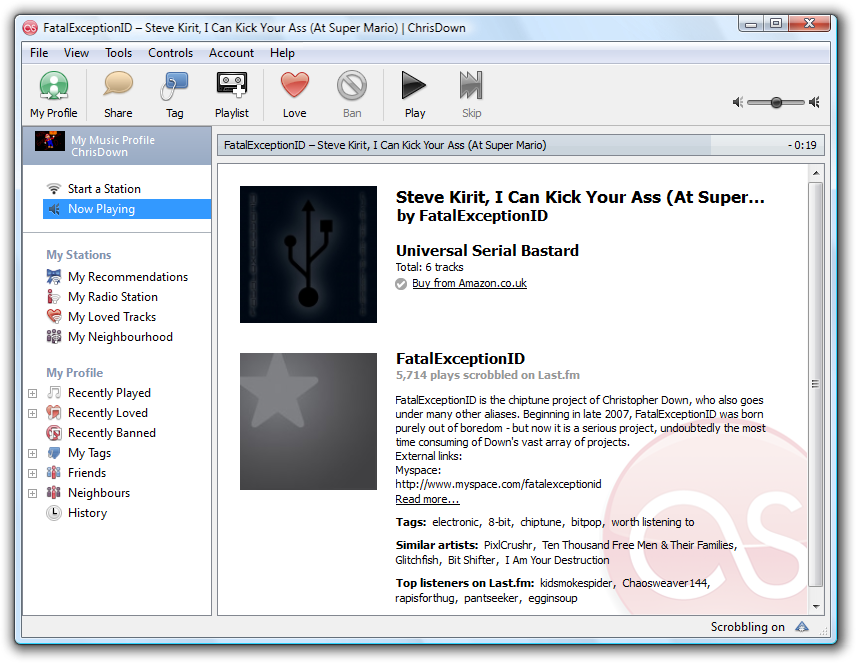
- Screenshot of the Windows client from version 1.4.2.58893 (early 2008)
- Developer: Last.fm
- Stable release: 2.1.37 / 22 March 2016; 10 years ago
- Preview release: 2.1.35 / 6 March 2013; 13 years ago
- Operating system: Microsoft Windows, macOS, Linux, Unix
- Type: Media player
- License: GNU General Public License
- Website: https://www.last.fm/about/trackmymusic

An "in-page" player is automatically provided for all listeners using an HTML5-enabled browser or with Adobe Flash installed on their computers. However, users must download and install the Last.fm client if they wish to include information about tracks played from their own digital music collection in their personal music profile.

Prior to August 2005, Last.fm provided an open stream that could be played in the user's music player of choice, along with a browser-based player control panel. This approach proved challenging to support and has been officially discontinued. The Last.fm client is currently the only officially supported music player for streaming customised Last.fm radio on desktop computers. The current version integrates the music player functions with the plugin that transmits all track data to the Last.fm server, effectively replacing the separate Last.fm Player and standalone track submission plugins. It is also free software licensed under the GNU General Public License and available for Linux, Mac OS X, and Microsoft Windows.

The player allows users to enter the name of any artist or tag, presenting a choice of several similar artist stations or global tag stations. Alternatively, users can play Recommendation radio or any of their personal radio stations without visiting the website.

The player displays the name of the currently playing station and track, the song's artist, title, and track length, as well as album details, the artist's photo and biographical information, album cover art when available, lists of similar artists, the most popular tags, and top fans. Several buttons allow users to love, skip, or ban a song. The love button adds the song to the user's loved tracks list, while the ban button prevents the song from being played again. Both features affect the user's profile, whereas the skip button does not. Other buttons enable users to tag or recommend the currently playing track. Additional features offered by the application include minor editing of the user's profile, such as removing recently played artists and songs from the loved, banned, or previously played track lists; lists of friends and neighbors; lists of tags; and a list of previously played radio stations. Users can also open their full Last.fm profile page directly from the player.

The client also allows users to install player plugins that integrate with various standalone media players, enabling the submission of tracks played in those programs.

In the latest version of the Last.fm Player application, users can choose to utilise an external player. When this option is selected, the Last.fm Player provides a local URL through which the Last.fm music stream is proxied. Users can then open this URL in their preferred media player.

A new version of the desktop client, which had been in beta since early 2012, was released on 15 January 2013. This version disabled the radio feature for free users; a paid subscription is required to access it.

Last.fm has also developed client software for mobile phones running the iPhone OS, BlackBerry OS, and the Android OS. These apps have been released only in the United States, the United Kingdom, and Germany, and the company has claimed for four years that it is negotiating licenses to make streaming available in other countries.

Last.fm experienced an outage lasting more than 22 hours on 10 June 2014, marking one of the longest interruptions the company has faced. However, the company remained in contact with visitors through a status page.

== See also ==
- List of Internet radio stations
- List of online music databases
