= StartupBus =

Annual technological startup competition

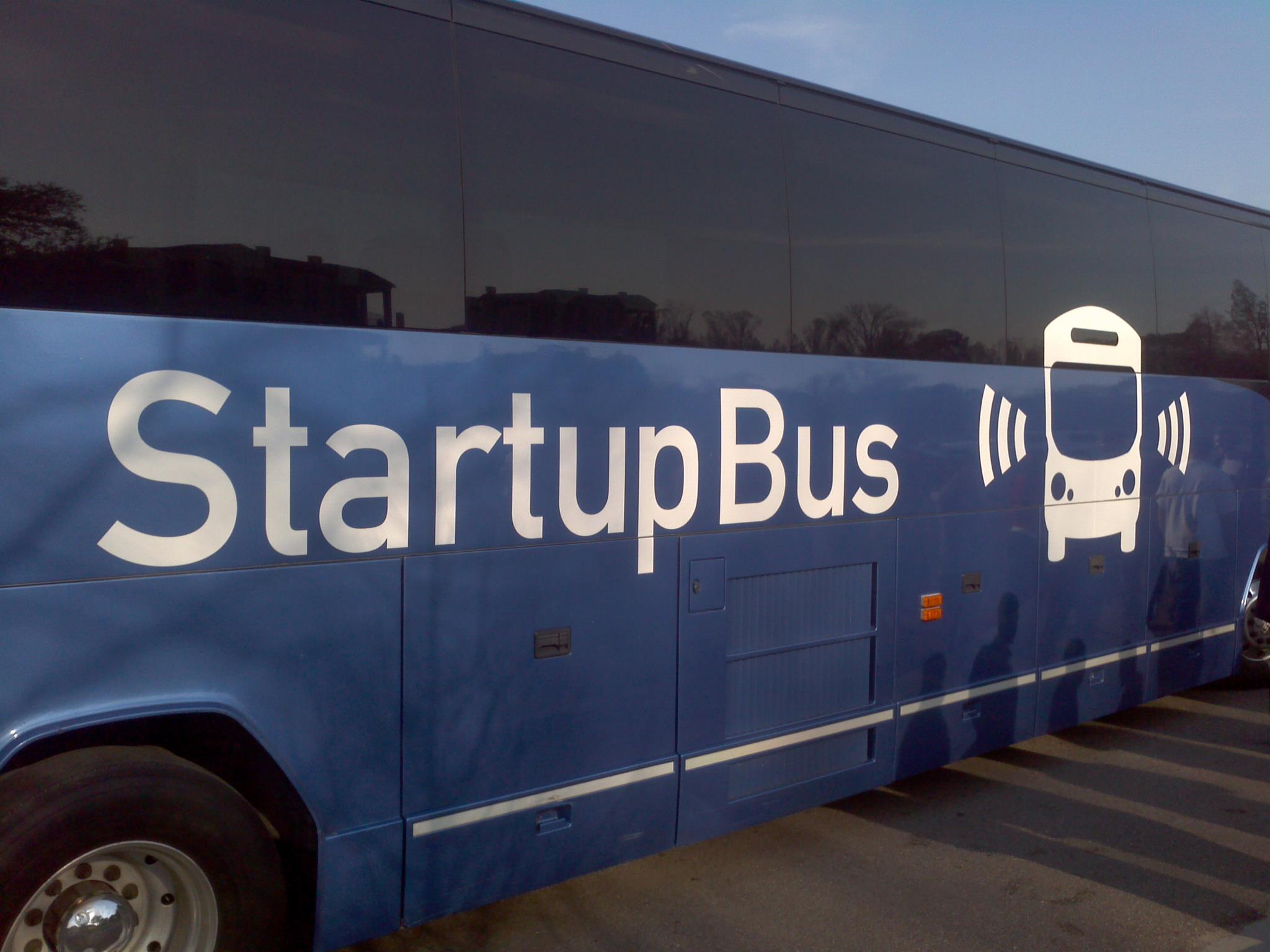
- Industry: Hackathon Business incubator
- Founded: February 1, 2010; 16 years ago
- Founder: Elias Bizannes
- Key people: Madelena Mak, Colleen Wong, William Yaworsky, Laura Horak, Keit Kollo, Steven Beeckman, Jonathan Gottfried, Sebastian Sielmann, Justin Isaf, Jonas Templestein, Brandon Leonardo
- Website: startupbus.com

StartupBus is an annual technological startup competition and entrepreneurship boot camp, described as a Hackathon, created by Elias Bizannes in February 2010.

The competition is held across a 3-day bus ride where contestants or "buspreneurs" compete to conceive the best technology startup. The competition seeks to attract young top talents to compete, to search for the most innovative startup conceived by the groups, where the winners are determined by a panel of judges. Starting from February 2011, it has gone through many iterations in various continents from 2011 to the present day, with the first in Austin, Texas and subsequently in North America, Europe and Africa.

StartupBus receives an extensive online media coverage through platforms such as BBC News, CNN and technology blogs and news sites such as The Next Web, VentureBeat, WIRED and TechCrunch. Live coverage of the competition was also broadcast through StartupBus.TV via Livestream.

== History ==
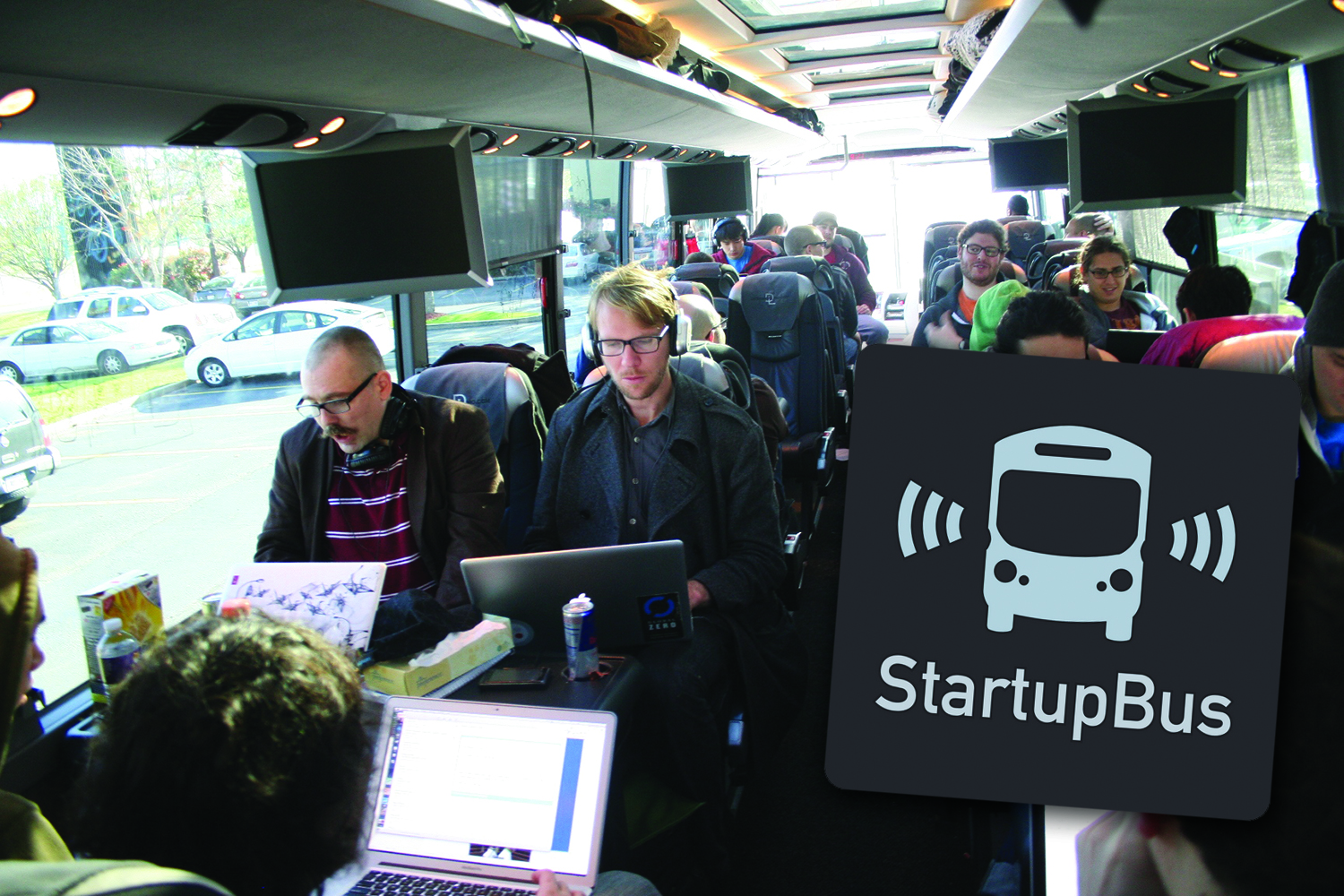
Inside of the StartupBus

StartupBus started off as a joke by Elias Bizannes and Bart Jellema on 1 July 2009 to start a hackathon on bus trip from San Francisco to Austin for the SXSW Conference. Eventually, the first bus launched on 1 February 2010, which consisted of 25 strangers on the way to Austin for the SXSW Conference, during which a total of 6 startups were conceived from the time in the bus.

Starting from February 2011, StartupBus was officially an annual technological startup competition and has run each year since then.

== Format ==
=== Prior to competition ===
StartupBus' start off location is determined through voting via Facebook and Twitter since 2012, after its evident success. Buspreneurs are selected based on an invite-only basis after indicating their interest through submission of an application and proposal with an interview there after, if shortlisted. Application are only open to those who specializes in the field of coding, designing and business. Pre-events are organised before the competition to bond buspreneurs with the objective to create a network of like-minded people.

=== Competition ===
The competition starts off with a 72-hour bus ride from the determined start-off location to its destination, voted through Facebook and Twitter. Each bus consists of 24 buspreneurs, which comes equipped with Wi-Fi, charging points and tables among the seats with no other luxuries.

Through the 72-hour bus ride, buspreneurs are to form teams of 3-4 members of their choosing and work on their final product which comes in the form of viable web applications to be presented to a panel of judges for submission on the end of the competition day. Winners will get funding to kick-start their idea with prior winners of StartupBus being able to expand their creations and creating new ones.

Power on board the StartupBus is however short in supply and with Wi-Fi that is unstable at times, making the competition even tougher for the buspreneurs. Experienced mentors from previous competitions are also present onboard the StartupBuses to render help to the teams where needed. Pit stops are made where buspreneurs gather feedback on their products, learn about business environments and to rest for the night.

=== Sponsors ===
Activities on board the StartupBus competition and application fee upon acceptance are subjected to the amount of funding they receive each year. As much as possible, StartupBus tries to minimise application fees to allow college students to have the ability to participate in the competition. If sponsorship is low, busprenuers may also have to pay for their own night lodging.

== Bus Routes ==
StartupBus competitions cover 4 continents - North America, Europe, Africa and Australasia - and 26 countries. 15 major events had been held since its debut in 2010.

=== North America ===
Eight StartupBus North America competitions had been held in North America annually since its debut in 2010.

Year	Date	Destination	Description	Buses
StartupBus	February 1, 2010	SXSW Conference, Austin, Texas	The first ever StartupBus. 25 strangers met on the way to Austin for the SXSW Conference. 6 startups were conceived from the time on the bus.	1 Bus: San Francisco
StartupBus 2011	March 1 to March 4, 2011	Austin, Texas	The first official StartupBus competition was held with 160 people on-board six buses which traveled across the United States and eventually converging at its final destination in Austin. The 3 day bus ride, conceived a total of 38 startups in the span of time, of which seven of the startup caught the eye of the judges.	5 Buses: Chicago, Cleveland, Miami, New York City and Silicon Valley
StartupBus Americas 2012	March 1 to March 4, 2012	Austin, Texas	This year, StartupBus departed from 11 regions with 12 buses before converging at its final destination in Austin. After 4 days, eight teams advanced to the finals, namely Bumper Crop, Curious City, Adventeur, Gourmair, Happstr, Scoringo, Spott and Cerealize.	10 Buses: San Francisco, Boston, Cincinnati, Las Vegas, Los Angeles, Louisiana, Mexico, New York City, Stanford University and Washington, D.C.
StartupBus Americas 2013	March 1 to March 4, 2013	SXSW Conference, Austin, Texas	StartupBus Americas 2013 once again headed to Austin, Texas for the SXSW Conference. There was also an addition of an alumni bus, inclusive of the 6 buses, which will compete against the winners. The alumni bus was the subject of a reality show web series published by Relativity Media for their Coin channel on YouTube	6 Buses: New York City, Mexico, Chicago, Tampa, San Francisco and the alumni bus.
StartupBus North America 2014	March 2 to March 5, 2014	Rackspace Castle, San Antonio, Texas	There were 3 judging rounds this year, where the original 30 startups are narrowed down to 16 semi-finalists selected in Rackspace's headquarters in Rackspace Castle before heading for the SXSW Conference.	7 Buses: Mexico City, Kansas City, Tampa Bay, Nashville, New York City, Seattle and San Francisco.
StartupBus North America 2015	June 4 to 8, 2015	36/86 Conference, Nashville, Tennessee	The founding team and directors of StartupBus decided that it was time to move the competition away from Austin, due to timing and value concerns, to Nashville, as the city had welcomed StartupBus with open arms.	5 Buses: Florida, Mexico, Midwest, New York City, and San Francisco.
StartupBus North America 2016	May 15 to 19, 2016	Boulder Startup Week, Boulder, Colorado	The North American competition of 2016 changed destination again. This time the buses rode to Boulder Startup Week. Each bus came with a theme, such as Food & Beverage, Emerging Markets, and IoT.	7 Buses: Cleveland, Mexico City, New York City, San Francisco, St. Louis, Tampa, and Vancouver.
StartupBus North America 2017	July 31 to August 4, 2017	New Orleans, Louisiana	The Akron bus was the "MakerBus", where teams were required to build physical prototypes of their products on the road. Due to long distances, the San Francisco bus is flown to Cleveland to merge with the Akron bus, and is lovingly nicknamed the "Saffron" bus. The New York City bus was the subject of the StartupBus mini-series created by Eric Mennel, as part of the StartUp podcast produced by Gimlet Media.	7 Buses: New York City, San Francisco, St. Louis, Mexico City, Tampa FL, New Orleans and Akron, Ohio.
StartupBus North America 2018	April 27 to May 1, 2018	New Orleans, Louisiana	The buses headed to New Orleans in Spring, coinciding with New Orleans Jazz & Heritage Festivals as well as Collision Conference. This year introduced the first buses from Detroit and Texas, as well as the diversity-focused Women+TGNC in Blockchain bus. A new Diversity Fellowship Program was introduced to encourage applicants from under-represented demographics to become entrepreneurs.	9 Buses: New York, Florida, Ohio, Detroit, St. Louis, Texas, Mexico, Silicon Valley, and Women+TGNC in Blockchain.
StartupBus North America 2019	July 24–29, 2019	New Orleans, Louisiana	For the 10th annual competition in North America, the buses will head to New Orleans again in 2019. A new Advancing Black Entrepreneurs bus was presented by JPMorgan Chase Advancing Black Pathways and Chase for Business, was designed for self-identifying Black tech talents with a custom route to travel to historically Black cities.	8 Buses: New York, Florida, Ohio, Toronto, Mexico, Silicon Valley, Washington D.C., and Advancing Black Entrepreneurs.

=== Europe ===
Six StartupBus Europe competitions had been held in Europe since 2012.

Year	Date	Destination	Description	Buses
StartupBus Europe	December 4 to 7, 2011	LeWeb, Paris, France	With the help of Dutch entrepreneur Arne Hulstein, who was leading the StartupBus Europe effort along with business partner Timan Rebel, founder Bizannes hoped to repeat the success of the North American StartupBus in Europe. Bringing together 26 riders across Europe, the multi-day journey had traversed the cities of Amsterdam, Copenhagen, Berlin, Zurich and finally Paris. Notably, the bus went on a boat in order to reach Copenhagen.	1 Bus: Amsterdam
StartupBus Europe 2012	December 3 to 6, 2012	LeWeb, Paris, France	The first European bus was a joint venture between StartupBus and FounderBus, where FounderBus ran the route from Germany, France and the United Kingdom and StartupBus ran the route from London, Spain and a wildcard location, later revealed to be the "Viking" bus from Copenhagen. The winning team from StartupBus Europe 2012 then proceeded onto the LeWeb Startup Competition as a finalist.	France, Germany, London, Spain and United Kingdom.
StartupBus Europe 2013	October 27 to 30, 2013	Pioneer's Festival, Vienna, Austria	StartupBus Europe 2013 saw a total of 150 buspreneurs, where buses departed for the 3 day road trip on 27 October 2013 from 6 regions.	Paris, Berlin, Rome, Barcelona, Amsterdam and London.
StartupBus Europe 2014	October 25 to 28, 2014	Pioneer's Festival, Vienna, Austria	StartupBus Europe 2014 is the first year for the Greek and Estonian bus which starts its journey from Athens to Vienna. Next to the buses from these new countries, there were a total of 5 more buses from Germany, France, Italy and the United Kingdom. A total of around 170 buspreneurs were on board for the 72-hour journey to Pioneer Festival in Vienna. 6 startups were conceived through the Greek journey, they are Trisleep which is a GPS based alarm, GoTrick which is an Uber for long-distance travel, HealthRate that finds and rates healthcare providers, Xplory which Gamifies cultural visits, Mezo and Zumo.	Estonia, France, Germany, Greece, Italy, United Kingdom.
StartupBus Europe 2015	August 29 to September 3, 2015	Pirate Summit, Cologne, Germany	StartupBus Europe 2015 changed its destination from Pioneers to Pirate Summit in Cologne. For the first time a Belgian bus participated in the competition.	Belgium, Estonia, Germany, Italy and United Kingdom.
StartupBus Europe 2016	September 2 to 7, 2016	Pirate Summit, Cologne, Germany	This competition was held on 2–7 September 2016, and had its demo day on 5 September 2016 at the Corda INCubator in Hasselt. Its final event at Pirate Summit in Cologne.	Belgium, France, Switzerland and United Kingdom.

=== Africa ===
StartupBus Africa 2013's first bus into Africa with a total of 30 buspreneurs started their journey from 17 November to 21 November 2013. The bus started out from the Capital of Zimbabwe, Harare and its final destination was South Africa, Cape Town for the Global Entrepreneurship Week.

=== Pacific ===
StartupBus' first time in Australia since its debut 5 years ago was done in partnership with SydStart. StartupBus Pacific 2014 started from 29 August 2014 to 2 September 2014 with 25 buspreneurs. StartupBus Pacific 2014 departed from Sydney and on to Melbourne and Canberra before arriving at its destination in Sydstart's Main Day 2014 in Sydney, Australia. Products that successfully caught the attention of judges and the public were Dinner Companion which links business people who are looking for company over the meal for dinner, Spexy.me which allows people to design and print their own 3-D glasses and order them, and FailPage which converts error pages into useful computer metrics for companies.

== Winners ==
After three rounds of judging, i.e. qualification, semi-final and final rounds, one winner is chosen by the judges.

=== North America ===
Year	Semi-Finalists	Finalists	Winners
2010			DateBrowsr and DormDorm were the winners of the inaugural StartupBus.
2011	Push Baby Push, SpeakerMeter, FlyByMiles, FriendStream.TV, Answer in 30, Battlefield Hunger, Connekt.me, Profile.IO.		Team TripMedi (New York) and WalkIN (Silicon Valley) both were announced winners of the 2011 StartupBus Competition as the panel of judges deemed both teams as outstanding service oriented startups.
2012		Bumper Crop, Curious City, Adventeur, Gourmair, Happstr, Scoringo, Spott, Cerealize	Winner of StartupBus Americas 2012 was presented to Cerealize (Silicon Valley) with their creation of a Website which allows for the customization of a cereal set which is shipped directly to homes upon purchase.
2013		For the Buspreneurs track: CareerMob (NYC), Cloudspotting (Mexico), Exversion (NYC), ghostPOST (San Francisco), grassroots.io (NYC), nextchapter (Chicago), USupply.me (Mexico). For the Alumni Masters track: Rep Check (Alumni), Yaank (Alumni)	CareerMob (New York) won StartupBus Americas 2013. CareerMob is an online platform that enables job-seeking military veterans to search for jobs.
2014	Beander, BelleLush, Bridgefy, Collecto, CropRate Wellness, MiniMap, Nutfund, On the List, Plumer, Roll, RV Envy, Sallie Will.com, Smart Host, Taste Buddy, Ticket Slip and Trustmll.io.	BelleLush (Tampa), Bridgefy (Mexico City), MiniMap (New York City), Smart Host (New York City) and more.	StartupBus North America 2014's winner was presented to Smart Host (New York), a Website that provides market intelligence and pricing for vacation rental managers. Runner up, Bridgefy, created a messaging app that works without Internet or SMS.
2015			StartupBus North America 2015 was won by Pizzafy (New York), an app that calculates exactly the amount of pizza one needs for a party, led by Meredith Broussard.
2016			Winner was Tub (San Francisco), built on Uber APIs, was an app that resurfaces saved articles and suggests audio/video content based on mood and the length of your Uber ride.
2017	Yetigram (Tampa), Del Campo (Mexico City), See Searcher (SF/Akron), Drop In Pedals (Tampa), Daisy (New York City), Course Align (Tampa), Lemo (Mexico City), Titan (SF/Akron), Money Expert (Mexico City), Initiate Today (St. Louis)	Daisy (New York City), Drop In Pedals (Tampa), Del Campo (Mexico City), Course Align (Tampa), Initiate Today (St. Louis)	Daisy (New York City) is the winner of the competition. It is a web app that simplifies funeral planning by guiding users through each step of the funeral process. It offers an interactive checklist, connects users with vendor services and creates a shareable events website.
2018		StoryBook.ink (Silicon Valley-Texas), Petfolio (Women+TGNC in Blockchain), DadSak (Florida), Nahua (Mexico), Digitalon (Northeast Ohio), Bundle (Silicon Valley-Texas)	The 2018 winner StoryBook.ink (Silicon Valley-Texas) is an online story book retailer that tackles the representation problem in children's books by enabling users to fully customize the main character and insert them into any story sold on the site.

=== Europe ===
Year	Winner
2012	StartupBus Europe 2012 Finalist was awarded to Haystack from Germany. Haystack is a dating application turning friends into match-makers by utilizing social media.
2013	StartupBus Europe 2013's winner was Aiden, a mood tracking mobile application which detect possible depression of an individual.
2014	Zumo, an on-demand engagement using WebRTC, was announced the winner of StartupBus Europe 2014.
2015	Warm Hands (Germany – www.warm-hands.org, @warmhandsorg) was the winner of the 2015 StartupBus Europe competition. Runners-up are Power Couple (UK – www.powercouple.eu, @PowerCoupleApp) and BetOn (Estonia – justbeton.com).
2016	Winner of this year's competition is Trustful.

=== Africa ===
StartupBus Africa 2013's winner was Workforce, a mobile-powered planning application connection employees and employers to simplify workforce planning in construction sites. The platform links unskilled worker teams with potential employers through an SMS-based communication system. Runners-up to StartupBus Africa 2013 were Funeral.ly, a funeral management application, and Bribed, an application to tackle bribery issues across Africa. A notable alum of this bus was Sterio.me, which later was accepted to the Start Up Chile accelerator and featured on BBC Africa and the Guardian. Other notable companies launched from the competition include grocery delivery service Instacart and the audio technology company LISNR.

=== Pacific ===
People of the Sun, a solar startup, was announced the winner of StartupBus Pacific 2014.

== Judges ==
=== North America ===
Year	Semi-Finals	Finals
2011	Philip Fierlinger - Co-founder and Head of Design at Xero; Josh Baer - CEO of other Inbox and Director of The Capital Factory; Mike Hirshland - Founder of Dogpatch and partner at Polaris Ventures; Ben Lerer - Founder of Thrillist and partner at Lerer ventures; Peter Flint - Partner at Polaris Ventures	Naval Ravikant - Co-founder of AngelList; Dave McClure - Angel investor and Founder of 500 Startups; Tom Ball of Austin Ventures; Greg Veen of TypeKit; Stephen Anderson of Baseline Ventures; Philip Fierlinger - Co-founder and head of design at Xero.
2012		Michael Schneider - CEO of Mobile Roadie; Tim Park - Tech Evangelist at Microsoft; Om Malik - Co-founder of Gigaom; David Hornik - Partner at August Capital; Olivier Mathiot - CEO of Priceminister.
2013		Mike Caprio - 2012 StartupBus New York conductor and Co-winner of StartupBus North America 2011 (TripMedi); Dave McClure - Angel investor and Founder of 500 Startups; Robert Scoble - Startup Liaison at Rackspace; Dan Walmsley - CTO at NationBuilder
2014	Rocio Paniagua - Co-founder of Ronin Public Relations; Justin Isaf - Veteran Online Community Manager; Kevin Galligan - Lead Developer and President of Touch Lab; Rose Jeantet - Conductor of French Bus 2013 (Europe 2014); Greg Ross-Munro - Founder of Teburu.	Guy Kawasaki - Special advisor to Google's Motorola unit; Robert Scoble - Startup Liaison at Rackspace; Liz Crawford - CTO at Birchbox; Cemre Gungor - Co-winner of StartupBus North America 2011 (TripMedi); Elizabeth McBride - Managing Associate at Orrick Silicon Valley; Alejandro Villanueva - Leader at POSiBLE; Michael Johnstone - Mentor at Techstars Austin and the Sprint Accelerator.
2016	Greg Ross-Munro - CEO and founder of Sourcetoad; Andrew Pinzler - Head of Innovation Labs at NBCUniversal (2014 Director and 2012 Alumni); Chris Bue - Founder of LBKDcorp; Keit Kollo - Product Manager at Weav Music, Director of StartupBus Europe	Chris Messina - Developer Experience Lead at Uber; Jose de Castro - CTO at Tropo
2017	Havilah Malone, Top Selling Author, Motivational Speaker; Noel Sus, Investor; Eduardo Erazo, Data Scientist at Amazon; Paul Reynolds, Developer; Magan Adams, Marketing; Sydney Ray, Marketing/Startup	Hector Carrera - Director of BBVA Bancomer; Jen Medbery - Founder of Kickboard; Raymond Lewis - Cofounder of Wastebits (2015 Alumni); Mitch Neff - Executive Director at StartupBus
2018	Madelena Mak, National Director at StartupBus; Greg Ross-Munro - CEO and Founder at Sourcetoad; Andrew Pinzler - Head of Innovation Labs at NBCUniversal (2014 Director and 2012 Alumni); Carol Tran - CEO and Founder at Chic Meets Geek	Jonathan Gottfried - Co-founder at Major League Hacking (2014 Director and 2012 Alumni); Grace S. Lee - Angel Investor at Pipeline Angels; Bobby Carbonell - Executive Director at Veterans Florida; Angie Scott - COO and Co-Owner at Search Influence

== Community ==
The StartupBus Community is a network of people who have previously participated in the various StartupBus competitions. The StartupBus Community consists of more than 1600 alumni from all around the world who interact to play, work and live together.

== Notable alumni companies ==
Many alumni continued to stay as a team after the hackathon and pursue new startups. Alumni businesses have raised over $400 million in funding, with notable acquisitions by Facebook, Andreessen Horowitz and Microsoft. Notable alumni companies include:

=== Founded on StartupBus ===
- Wastebits
- Smart Host
- Bridgefy

=== Founded by StartupBus teams and alumni ===
- Instacart
- Major League Hacking
- Touchlab
- Sunrise (acquired by Microsoft)
- Branch (acquired by Facebook)
- Mondo
- Keen IO
- Complion
- Airpair
- WeVue
- 1 Second Everyday

== Media reception ==
StartupBus had received generally positive reception from the hackathon community. VentureBeat described StartupBus, according to its riders, "the mother of all hackathons", and WIRED Magazine called "the StartupBus as close to blood sport as Silicon Valley entrepreneurship gets. By compressing the time from concept to prototype, it becomes a pedal-to-the-metal business incubator."
