= Junction (hackathon) =

Collaborative technology event

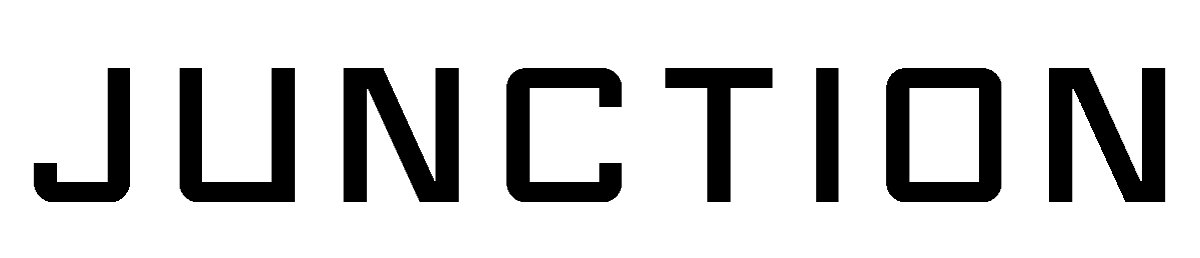
- Formation: 2015
- Type: Student-run non-profit organization
- Purpose: Junction exists to build an ecosystem that pushes the boundaries of technology.
- Location: Espoo, Finland
- Key people: Joel Lahtinen (CEO)
- Website: http://www.hackjunction.com

Junction is a hackathon organizer with headquarters in Espoo, Finland. Started in 2015, Junction grew to be the largest hackathon organizers in Europe. In 2018 it expanded globally with a Junction event at Tsinghua University in China with cooperation from Chinese and South Korean universities bringing high performing students to attend the event in Helsinki.

Over the course of the years Junction introduced various formats of events to its public, the biggest one being their yearly Junction Hackathon. This event brings together developers, designers, and entrepreneurs from around the world and helps them build solutions to real world challenges from local and multinational companies. The organization uses Gravel as its judging platform, though the system has experienced technical difficulties during multiple events that have affected the voting process.

== History ==
=== Junction 2015 ===
Junction was first launched in 2015. The event was held on November 6–8 in Kattilahalli, Helsinki and gathered more than 550 participants and resulted in 145 different projects. Notable partners included Uber, Finnair, Supercell, Reaktor, and others.

The winner Junction 2015 was Slush Smackdown, from the Supercell Unlimited track. The team created a game where the players program their own boxer who then competes against other players' codes in real-time. It also won the whole Slush Hacks -hackathon competition main prize, worth 20 000 EUR.

=== Junction 2016 ===
Junction 2016 was held on November 25–27 in Wanha Satama, in Katajanokka, Helsinki, Finland. About 1300 participants from over 77 nationalities attended the hackathon. Partners included Supercell, Zalando, the European Space Agency, General Electric, Sitra, Tieto, UPM and others.

The teams had 48 hours to develop their ideas and afterwards demo them to other attendants and judges. The main prize for the winning idea of the 2016 event was 20 000 EUR, and many companies offered their own bounties for solving challenges in a specific way or using pre-specified technology. Teams were provided a number of different API's and other emerging technologies to develop their concepts including Oculus Rifts, HTC Vives, Apple Watches, 3D-printers, Microsoft Hololens, and Estimote Beacons among others.

The winner team was suju.online, who created a tool for event organizers and public transportation decision makers that allows them to design dynamic routing for the self-driving bus. The team originated from the local Aalto University and the hack was part of the Future of Mobility track.

=== Junction 2017 ===
Junction 2017 was held on November 24–26 in Dipoli, the main building of the Otaniemi campus of Aalto University. About 1500 participants from over 90 nationalities attended the hackathon. Partners included Spotify, Daimler, Smartly.io, European Space Agency, Microsoft and others.

As always, the teams had 48 hours to work on their projects, with the event ending on Sunday with a demo expo. This year, the winner of the 20 000 EUR main prize was appointed using a new judging process. An open source technology called Gavel was used first to determine the finalists from each track. Then, a panel of expert judges inspected each finalist in delicate detail, even going through the project's code repositories.

The main prize was won by team Glados. The team created Signvision, a tool for maintenance personnel to map out traffic signs that need to be repaired. The hack was part of the Big Data track.

=== Junction 2018 ===
Junction 2018 was held on November 23–25 in Dipoli, Espoo, Finland. About 1300 participants from all over the world attended the hackathon. Partners included Facebook, Daimler, Supercell, McKinsey, Epic Games, Vkontakte, Ericsson and others.

The teams had 48 hours to work on their projects, with the event ending on Sunday with a demo expo. For 2018, the reviewing process for the main-prize winner was improved further to make it more transparent for the participants. Instead of a multi-level process that was unclear to participants, Junction 2018 used a peer reviewing system, where the participants themselves chose the main winner.

The winner project was Oneiro, created by the previous winning team Glados. Oneiro is an application that lets electric vehicle owners rent their EV chargers for others in need.

=== Junction 2019 ===
Junction 2019 was held on November 15–17 in the Väre building, where the Aalto University School of Arts, Design and Architecture and The Aalto University School of Business are located. About 1500 participants from all over the world attended the event. Partners included CGI, Ericsson, Rovio, Microsoft, Valmet, Sitra, Business Finland and many more.

=== Junction 2020 – Connected ===
Junction 2020 – Connected was held on November 6–8. The COVID-19 pandemic opened the doors for a hybrid event, gathering people all over the world to simultaneously hack in both physical locations and online. Partners included Genelec, HKScan, Paulig, OP, Supercell, Aito and Brella.

The winner project was Saavi – healthy finance. The team presented a mobile solution for banks that helps their customers to understand the level of financial health by analyzing spendings and subscriptions with a help of machine learning — and got an entertaining experience of interaction with personal finance in AR.

=== Junction 2021 ===
Junction 2021 was held on November 19–21. The hackathon was once again organized in a hybrid form, participants could attend live from one of the 8 hubs scattered around the world or join the challenge online on Gather. Partners included Huawei, Kone, CGI, Miro, Oras and others.

The main prize was won by team Nice-ify. The team created a solution that replaces hateful language with a "nice-ified" version in voice chat environments.

=== Junction 2025 ===
Junction 2025 was held on November 14–16. The event took place at a brand new venue, Hype Hybridiarena in Espoo, Finland. The hackathon attracted over 1,500 participants, making it the largest Junction Hackathon to date, with 111 nationalities, 291 projects, and 4246 collective hackathons among the participants. The main partner of the hackathon was Sensofusion, which is a Finnish technology company specializing in counter-drone (C-UAS) detection and mitigation systems. Other partners included n8n, Supercell, Figma, Wolt among many more with 40+ in total.

The main prize was won by team WAVELET. Their project is a real-time electromagnetic (radio-wave) simulation built in C++ and OpenGL, using GPU-accelerated compute shaders to model Maxwell's equations on a spatial grid.

=== Junction 2026 ===
Junction 2026 was held from November 13 to 15 at Hype Areena in Espoo. The theme was "European Tech Renaissance" and the prize pool was €100,000.

== Junction Main Prize Winners ==
Year	Project name	Team Members
2015	Slush Smackdown	Tuomas Husu, Kimmo Koivisto, Jaakko Nygren, Timo Lehto
2016	Suju.online	Matti Parkkila, Aleksi Jokela, Jere Vaara, Aleksi Tella, Henri Nurmi
2017	Signvision	Ville Toiviainen, Andreas Urbanski, Teemu Taskula
2018	Oneiro	Ville Toiviainen, Andreas Urbanski, Teemu Taskula
2019	Tassu Passu	Tulika Ganoo, Yevhenii Kalashnyk, Reinis Skorovs, Ronalds Sovas
2020	Saavi – Healthy Finance	Alexander Zimin, Andrey Krylov, Andrey Volodin, Anton Lebedev, Egor Petrov
2021	Nice-ify	Bryce Cronin
2022	Bitter Sweet	Donghoon Jang, Sunghun Kim, Junseong Kim, Chansu Park
2023	Driving Change – In the Blink for Safety	Markus Andersson, David Enberg, Alex Granlund, Johannes Peltola
2024	BREAKDANCE	Frank Sandqvist
2025	WAVELET	Rudrrayan Manna, Arjun Juneja, Keanu Czirjak, Akshith Alluri

== Other events and concepts ==
=== Hel Tech ===
Hel Tech is a non-profit tech meetup organized monthly in Helsinki, Finland. The meetups consist of keynote speeches, demos, research showcases and discussions, all focusing on a current tech topic. Past speakers have included Risto Siilasmaa (Chairman, Nokia & F-Secure), Ilkka Paananen (Founder & CEO, Supercell), Lidia Perovskaya (Project Manager, VKontakte), Kimmo Kanto (Head of Space, Business Finland), Anne Oikarinen (Senior Security Consultant, Nixu) and many more.

=== JunctionX ===
JunctionX is a global hackathon program launched in 2018 through which local teams across the world can organize a hackathon event in their own home city. JunctionX has been organized in various cities around the world including Tokyo (Japan), Hanoi (Vietnam), Budapest (Hungary), Seoul (South Korea), Thuwal (Saudi Arabia) and many more. In 2020 JunctionX will expand to Exeter (United Kingdom), Algiers (Algeria) and Barcelona (Spain).

=== Other events ===
==== Tech Race ====
Tech Race is a series of smaller hackathons where cities across Finland and Europe compete against each other.

==== Terminal ====
Terminal is the official pre-event of Junction. During Terminal participants take part in different activities in the Helsinki area and attend events hosted by partner companies.

==== Stupid Hack ====
A smaller hackathon event where instead of solving companies' real challenges the participants compete on who comes up with the stupidest idea and execution.

== Organization ==
Junction is a volunteer-based, non-profit organization composed mainly of students from different Finnish universities. It is owned by the non-profit foundation Startup Säätiö, but gathers all of its funding from the partnership contracts between its partner companies.

== Other notable hackathon events ==
- HackMIT
- LA Hacks
- MHacks
