= Sonatus =

American automotive software company

Sonatus, Inc.
- Type: Private
- Industry: Automotive software, Artificial intelligence
- Founded: July 3, 2018; 8 years ago
- Founders: Jeffrey Chou, Yu Fang
- Headquarters: Sunnyvale, U.S.
- Area served: Worldwide
- Key people: Jeffrey Chou (CEO & Co-founder); Yu Fang (CTO & Co-founder); John Heinlein (CMO); Philip Hughes (CRO); David Sangster (COO); Mahesh Karanth (CFO); Alexandre Corjon (SVP of Engineering)
- Products: Sonatus Vehicle Platform; Sonatus AI Technician; Sonatus Collector AI; Sonatus AI Director; Sonatus Automator AI; Sonatus Updater
- Services: Software-defined vehicle (SDV) technologies, cloud-enabled automotive platforms
- Number of employees: 280–300 (2026)
- Website: www.sonatus.com

Sonatus, Inc. is a U.S.-based automotive software company focused on tools and platforms for software-defined vehicles (SDVs) with artificial intelligence.

== History ==
Sonatus was incorporated on July 3, 2018, in Sunnyvale, California, by Jeffrey Chou and Yu Fang. Between 2018 and 2020, Sonatus focused on building its initial vehicle software platform and establishing relationships within the automotive technology ecosystem.

In July 2021, Sonatus announced a US$35 million Series A funding round to support product development and commercial expansion. In August 2021, Sonatus announced a partnership with Hyundai Motor Group to collaborate on next‑generation electrical/electronic (E/E) architecture and digital vehicle technologies, including integration of Sonatus software into Genesis, Hyundai, and Kia vehicles.

On February 24, 2022, Sonatus presented the next generation of its Digital Dynamics Vehicle Platform, enabling post-production codeless updates for vehicles.

In April 2022, Sonatus was named an Automotive News 2022 PACE Award finalist and joined the SOAFEE Special Interest Group to accelerate the evolution of software-defined vehicles. On May 3, 2022, Sonatus was recognized on Forbes America's Best Startup Employers list. On August 25, 2022, Sonatus joined the Renesas R-Car Consortium to further advance software-defined vehicle innovation.

In October 2022, Sonatus entered the European market by opening an office in Paris. Later that month, the company was recognized as “Overall Connected Solution of the Year” in the 2022 AutoTech Breakthrough Awards program. On December 7, 2022, Sonatus announced a $75 million corporate funding round to accelerate vehicle software innovation, bringing total disclosed funding to more than US$110 million.

At CES 2023, Sonatus demonstrated its production software technologies used by Hyundai, Kia, and Genesis, and showcased its next‑generation vehicle software built on reference designs from semiconductor and Tier‑1 suppliers.

In March 2023, Sonatus was named by Forbes as one of America's Best Startup Employers and opened an office in Shanghai to strengthen its presence in Asia.

On April 19, 2023, the company expanded into Japan, and on May 19, 2023, Sonatus launched in Taiwan. On June 6, 2023, Sonatus unveiled Sonatus Automator, a software product designed to automate vehicle software workflows.

On September 5, 2023, the company announced a strategic investment by NEC and the Translink Orchestrating Future Fund and showcased its presence at Automotive World 2023. On October 4, 2023, Sonatus Automator was named “Connected Car Innovation of the Year” by the AutoTech Breakthrough Awards.

On January 4, 2024, the company introduced Sonatus Updater, a comprehensive over‑the‑air (OTA) software update management solution designed for complex vehicle software environments. On April 18, 2024, Sonatus announced the expansion of its engineering footprint with the opening of an R&D and engineering center in Dublin, Ireland, aimed at supporting its European operations.

On July 1, 2024, the company appointed Mahesh Karanth as Chief Financial Officer. On November 12, 2024, Sonatus announced the opening of a new engineering design centre in Pune, India.

At CES 2025, Sonatus demonstrated Sonatus AI Technician and introduced generative AI enhancements to its Sonatus Collector AI and Sonatus Automator AI products, focusing on application in vehicle development, diagnostics, and system optimization.

In September 2025, Sonatus unveiled its AI Director platform to enable in‑vehicle edge AI at scale. In October 2025, Sonatus's AI‑based software platform AI Technician received recognition as an innovation of the year in automotive artificial intelligence by AutoTech Breakthrough.

In December 2025, Sonatus's and the Nissan Technical Centre Europe's partnership. Later that month, the company announced that Sonatus SDV technologies were deployed in more than 6 million vehicles on the road.

In January 2026, Sonatus presented a number of AI-powered software-defined vehicle innovations at CES 2026, including demonstrations of edge AI, diagnostics, and fleet applications with major industry partners including Nissan Technical Centre Europe, Bosch, Michelin, NXP, Renesas, MOTER, and others.

In June 2026, Sonatus expanded its product portfolio with the introduction of the Fastlane brand.

In July 2026, Embedded.com published a feature on Sonatus's edge AI technology for software-defined vehicles, describing the company's collaboration with Schaeffler AG on motion-control systems and its use of edge AI for vehicle diagnostics and software optimization.

== Activities ==
Sonatus, Inc. develops software platforms for software-defined vehicles, offering data automation tools, over-the-air update management, and in-vehicle edge AI software. The company collaborates with automotive OEMs, Tier 1 suppliers, and silicon/technology vendors to integrate its software into production vehicles and development workflows.
