= HackYeah =

Annual technology hackathon in Poland

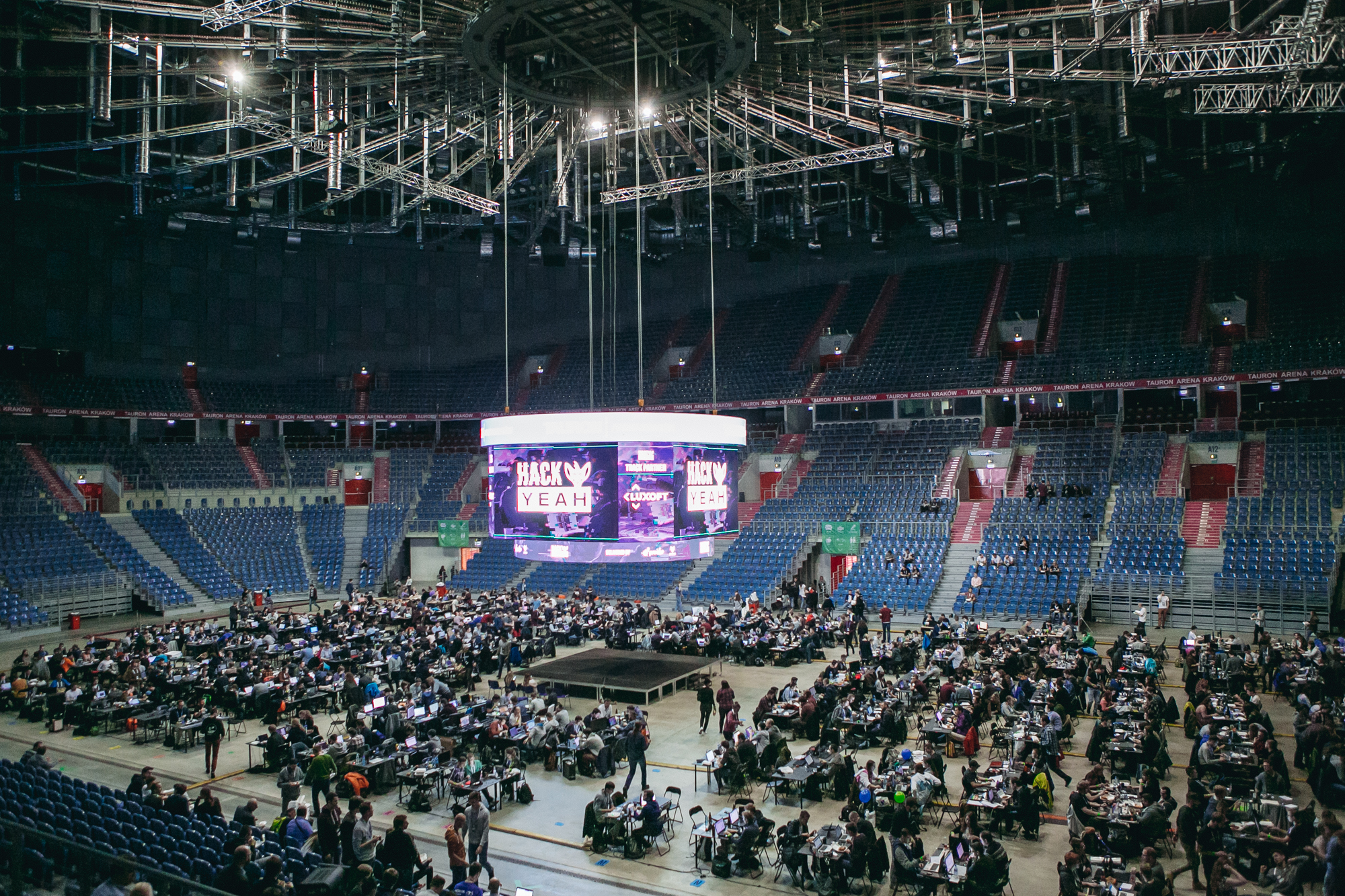
- The beginning of HackYeah 2017 in Tauron Arena Kraków
- Status: Active
- Genre: Hackathon
- Frequency: Annual
- Locations: Poland (Kraków, Warsaw, Katowice)
- Inaugurated: 2017
- Website: hackyeah.pl

HackYeah is an annual hackathon held in Poland. Established in 2017, the event is recognized as one of the largest stationary (in-person) hackathons in Europe.

== History and format ==
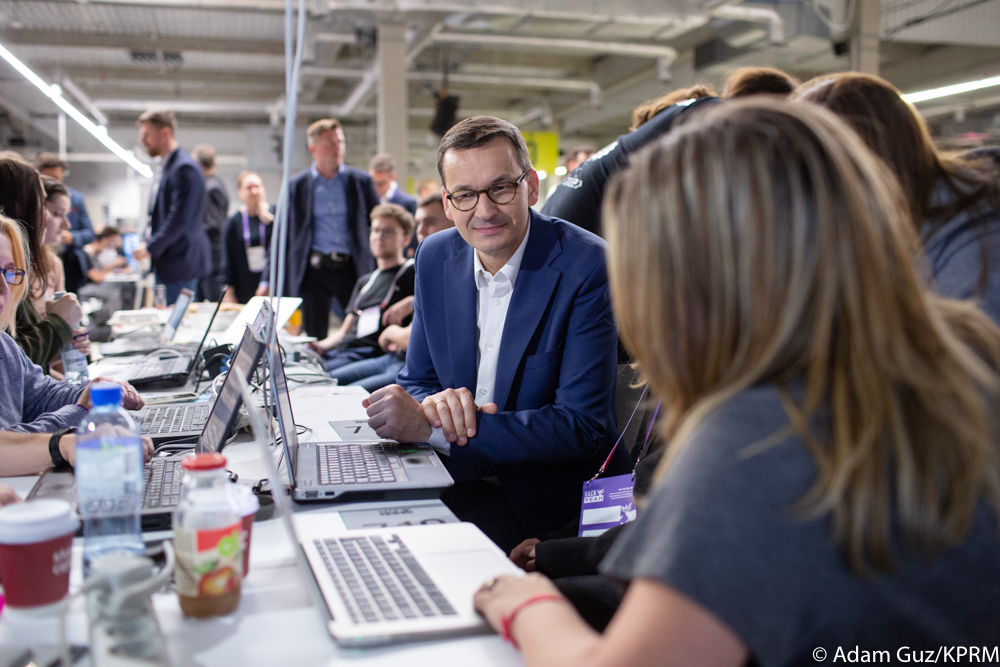
Polish Prime Minister Mateusz Morawiecki visiting the 2019 edition of HackYeah.

The event typically lasts 24 hours, during which participants develop technological solutions across various categories, including artificial intelligence, cybersecurity, fintech, and ecology. Projects are submitted either to open-ended tasks set by the organizers or specialized challenges designed by corporate, institutional, and government partners.

The inaugural event took place in Kraków in 2017. Due to its scale and integration with national technological initiatives, the hackathon has drawn consistent attention from state officials; during both the 2018 and 2019 editions, the event was officially visited by the Prime Minister of Poland, Mateusz Morawiecki.

In 2020, due to the COVID-19 pandemic, the hackathon temporarily transitioned to a virtual format. In 2021, it returned as a hybrid event, combining global remote participation with a limited in-person gathering at the Spodek arena in Katowice.

Since 2022, HackYeah has returned to its large-scale stationary format at the Tauron Arena Kraków. Recent iterations of the event regularly draw thousands of developers, with the 2023 edition seeing nearly 3,000 attendees submit over 300 projects for a combined prize pool exceeding PLN 500,000.

== See also ==
- NASA International Space Apps Challenge
