= AirPair =

Service and eponymous company

- Type: Private
- Founded: March 2013; 13 years ago
- Founder: Jonathon Kresner
- Headquarters: United States
- Website: https://www.airpair.com

AirPair is a service and eponymous company that connects people who need help with programming issues (usually, programmers at small technology companies or at finance companies that use technology products) and people who can help them. Unlike services such as oDesk and Elance, AirPair is not a service for outsourcing programming tasks, but rather a service that facilitates one-off knowledge transfers from people with highly specialized knowledge of particular technology stacks or programming issues to people who are in need of specialized help.

== History ==
AirPair launched in March 2013, with founder Jonathon Kresner, who hails from Australia, working full-time, and it soon hired three other part-time developers to work alongside him. Kresner had previously founded two other startups: Preparty, a social invitation and event-booking service based in Australia, and ClimbFind, an online rock-climbing community that reached a million users. Kresner was inspired to work on AirPair because he saw the need for outside expert assistance with programming issues arise regularly at these startups.

In November 2013, founder Kresner describes the company's initial success at bootstrapping itself to "Ramen profitability" in a blog post. In December 2013, AirPair was accepted into the Winter 2014 Y Combinator batch.

In March 2014, AirPair announced it would launch partnerships with Stripe, Twilio, and other companies that had their own application programming interfaces, allowing developers having trouble with the APIs to seek help over AirPair from experts on the APIs.

AirPair presented at the Y Combinator Winter 2014 Demo Day on March 25, 2014, and successfully raised over $1 million within the next 48 hours.

== Reception ==
A review of AirPair by Will Lam stressed that because payment was based on time rather than results, it was important to use it for clearly thought-out questions where one had high confidence that the session would help.

Dennis Beatty, who met AirPair founder Jonathon Kresner in March 2014, wrote in April 2014 a glowing review of AirPair's vision of connecting people and its business success.

AirPair has been compared with other peer-to-peer coding help sites such as Codementor and HackHands.
