= Codementor =

Online platform

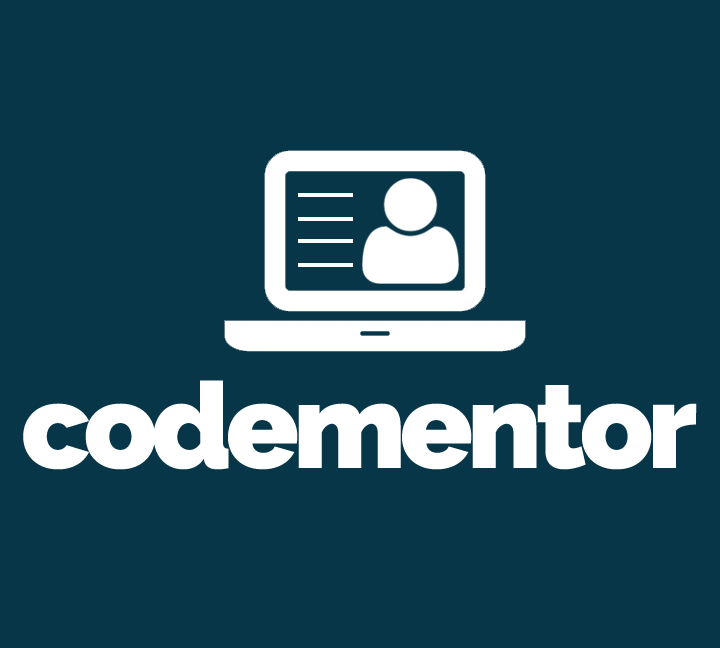
- Industry: Online education; Online outsourcing
- Headquarters: Taipei, Taiwan; San Francisco, California, United States
- Area served: Worldwide
- Products: E-mentoring; Online Programming Crash Course
- Owner: Weiting Liu
- Website: www.codementor.io

Codementor is an online platform for freelance computer programming and coding tutors. The company is based in Taipei, Taiwan, and San Francisco, California.

== History ==
Codementor was founded in 2013 by Weiting Liu. The company received the initial funding from Kai-Fu Lee’s venture capital firm TMI and participated in the Techstars accelerator program in Seattle in 2013. It was officially launched in 2014.

In 2015, Codementor launched Live Group classes.

It was one of the startups chosen by the Taiwanese Government to represent Taiwan in the 2016 TechCrunch Disrupt hackathon in San Francisco. In March 2016, Codementor partnered with Africa-based startup Andela.

In 2016, Codementor raised $1.6 million in a seed funding round.

During the COVID-19 pandemic, Codementor launched an initiative designed to match coders with pandemic-related software projects.
