= Hackathon =

Event in which groups of software developers work at an accelerated pace

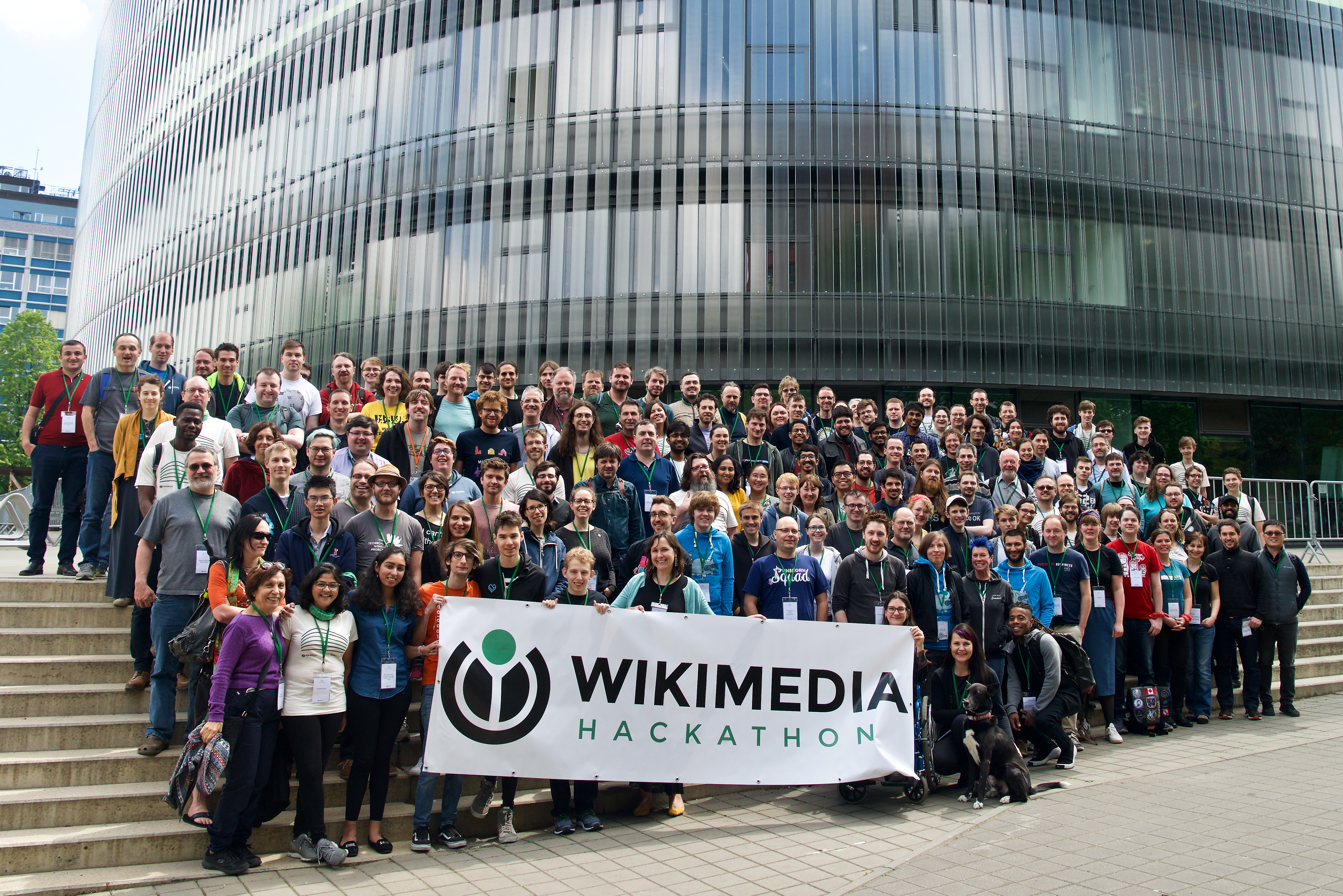
A Wikimedia Hackathon in Prague

A hackathon (also known as a hack day, hackfest, datathon or codefest; a portmanteau of hacking and marathon) is an event where people engage in rapid and collaborative engineering over a relatively short period of time, such as 24 or 48 hours in person or several days online. They are often run using agile software development practices, such as sprint-like design wherein computer programmers and others involved in software development, including graphic designers, interface designers, product managers, domain experts, and others collaborate intensively on engineering projects, such as software engineering.

The goal of a hackathon is to create functioning software or hardware by the end of the event. Hackathons tend to have a specific focus, which can include the programming language used, the operating system, an application, an API, or the subject and the demographic group of the programmers. In other cases, there is no restriction on the type of software being created or the design of the new system.

In addition to creating functional software or hardware, hackathons can help participants develop skills like problem solving, critical thinking, creativity, team work, communication and time management. Hackathons can also lead to formation of new companies, finding innovative solutions to real-world problems, or building a community around a particular technology or cause.

== Etymology ==
The word "hackathon" is a portmanteau of the words "hack" and "marathon", where "hack" is used in the sense of exploratory programming, not its alternate meaning as a reference to breaching computer security.

OpenBSD's apparent first use of the term referred to a cryptographic development event held in Calgary on June 4, 1999, where ten developers came together to avoid legal problems caused due to export regulations of cryptographic software from the United States. Since then, a further three to six events per year have occurred around the world to advance development, generally on university campuses.

For Sun Microsystems, the usage referred to an event at the JavaOne conference from June 15 to June 19, 1999; there John Gage challenged attendees to write a program in Java for the new Palm V using the infrared port to communicate with other people who are using Palm and register it on the Internet.

In the mid to late 2000s, hackathons became more widespread. Companies and venture capitalists saw them as a way to develop new software technologies quickly and target new areas for innovation and funding. Some major companies were born from these hackathons, such as GroupMe, which began as a project at a hackathon at the TechCrunch Disrupt 2010 conference; in 2011 it was acquired by Skype for $85 million. The software PhoneGap began as a project at the iPhoneDevCamp (later renamed iOSDevCamp) in 2008; the company whose engineers developed PhoneGap, Nitobi, refocused itself around PhoneGap, and Nitobi was bought by Adobe in 2011 for an undisclosed amount.

== Structure ==
Hackathons typically start with communication via a presentation or a web page from the hosting organization that mentions the objectives, terms, and details of the hackathon. Developers register to participate in the hackathon and are qualified after the organization screens their background and skills.

When the hackathon event begins, the participating individuals or teams start their programming work. The administrator of the hackathon is typically able to answer questions and offer help when their issues come up in the event.

Hackathons can last several hours to several days. For hackathons that last 24 hours or longer, especially competitive ones, eating is often informal, with participants often subsisting on food like pizza and energy drinks. Sometimes sleeping is informal as well, with participants sleeping on-site with sleeping bags.

At the end of hackathons, there are usually a series of demonstrations in which each group presents their results. To capture the ideas and work-in-progress, people often post a video of the demonstrations, blog about results with screenshots and details, share links and progress on social media, suggest a place for open source code and generally make it possible for people to share, learn from, and possibly build from the ideas generated and initial work completed.

There is sometimes a contest element as well, in which a panel of judges select the winning teams, and prizes are given. At many hackathons, the judges are made up of organisers and sponsors. At BarCamp-style hackathons, that are organised by the development community, such as iOSDevCamp, the judges are usually made up of peers and colleagues in the field. Such prizes are sometimes a substantial amount of money: a social gaming hackathon at the TechCrunch Disrupt conference offered $250,000 in funding to the winners, while a controversial 2013 hackathon run by Salesforce.com had a payout of $1 million to the winners, billed as the largest-ever prize.

== Types of hackathons ==
=== For an application type ===
Some hackathons focus on a particular platform such as mobile apps, a desktop operating system, web development or video game development.

Mobile app hackathons like Over the Air, held at Phoenix Park, Ireland, can see a large amount of corporate sponsorship and interest.

Music Hack Day, a hackathon for music-related software and hardware applications, is a popular event, having been held over 30 times around the world since 2009. Also Music Tech Fest, a three-day interdisciplinary festival for music ideas bringing together musicians with hackers, researchers and industry, features a hackathon. Similarly, Science Hack Day, a hackathon for making things with science, has been held over 45 times in over 15 countries around the world since 2010.

Hackathons have been held to develop applications that run on various mobile device operating systems, such as Android, iOS and MeeGo. Hackathons have also been held to develop video-based applications and computer games. Hackathons where video games are developed are sometimes called game jams.

"TV Hackfest" events have been held in both London and San Francisco, focusing mainly on social television and second screen technologies. In TV Hackfests, challenge briefs are typically submitted by content producers and brands, in the form of broadcast industry metadata or video content, while sponsors supply APIs, SDKs and pre-existing open source software code.

Hackathons have also been used in the life sciences to advance the informatics infrastructure that supports research. The Open Bioinformatics Foundation ran two hackathons for its member projects in 2002 and 2003, and since 2010 has held 2-day "codefests" preceding its annual conference. The National Evolutionary Synthesis Center has co-organized and sponsored hackathons for evolutionary bioinformatics since 2006. BioHackathon is an annual event that started in 2008 targeted at advancing standards to enable interoperable bioinformatics tools and Web services. Neuroscientists have also used hackathons to bring developers and scientists together to address issues that range from focusing on a specific information system (e.g., Neurosynth Hackathon and the Allen Brain Atlas Hackathon) and providing reserved time for broad scientific inquiry (e.g., Brainhack), to using specific challenges that focus hacking activity (e.g., HBM Hackathon).

There has been an emergence of 'datathons' or data-focused hackathons in recent years. These events challenge data scientists working with others attending to together use creativity and data analysis skills and platforms to build, test and explore solutions and dashboards which analyse huge datasets in a limited amount of time. These are increasingly being used to deliver insights in big public and private datasets in various disciplines including business, healthcare news media and for social causes.

=== Using a specific programming language, API, or framework ===
There have been hackathons devoted to creating applications that use a specific language or framework, like JavaScript, Node.js, HTML5 and Ruby on Rails.

Some hackathons focus on applications that make use of the application programming interface, or API, from a single company or data source. Open Hack, an event run publicly by Yahoo! since 2006 (originally known as "Hack Day", then "Open Hack Day"), has focused on usage of the Yahoo! API, in addition to APIs of websites owned by Yahoo!, like Flickr. The company's Open Hack India event in 2012 had over 700 attendees. Google has run similar events for their APIs, as has the travel guide company Lonely Planet.

The website Foursquare notably held a large, global hackathon in 2011, in which over 500 developers at over 30 sites around the world competed to create applications using the Foursquare API. A second Foursquare hackathon, in 2013, had around 200 developers. The IETF organizes Hackathons for each IETF meetings which are focused on IETF Internet Draft and IETF RFC implementation for better inter-operability and improved Internet Standards.

=== For a cause or purpose ===
There have been a number of hackathons devoted to improving government, and specifically to the cause of open government. One such event, in 2011, was hosted by the United States Congress. Starting in 2012, NASA has been annually hosting the International Space Apps Challenge.

In 2014, the British government and HackerNest ran DementiaHack, the world's first hackathon dedicated to improving the lives of people living with dementia and their caregivers. The series continues in 2015, adding the Canadian government and Facebook as major sponsors.

The Global Game Jam, the largest video game development hackathon, often includes optional requirements called 'diversifiers' that aim to promote game accessibility and other causes.

VanHacks is an annual hackathon that is part of Vancouver Startup Week. The focus of the hackathon is creating solutions for local non-profit organizations from the Vancouver area over the course of 36 hours. VanHacks was created in 2016 by TTT Studios.

Various hackathons have been held to improve city transit systems. Hackathons aimed at improvements to city local services are increasing, with one of the London Councils (Hackney) creating a number of successful local solutions with a two-day Hackney-thon. There have also been a number of hackathons devoted to improving education, including Education Hack Day and on a smaller scale, looking specifically at the challenges of field work based geography education, the Field Studies Council hosted FSCHackday. Random Hacks of Kindness is another popular hackathon, devoted to disaster management and crisis response. ThePort instead is a hackathon devoted to solving humanitarian, social and public interest challenges. It's hosted by CERN with partners from other non-governmental organizations such as ICRC and UNDP.

In March 2020, numerous world-wide initiatives led by entrepreneurs and governmental representatives from European countries resulted in a series of anti-crisis hackathons Hack the Crisis, with first to happen in Estonia, followed up by Poland, Latvia, and Ukraine. Beginning in 2020, the Michal Sela Forum has run hackathons to develop technology to help prevent domestic violence.

=== As a tribute or a memorial ===
A number of hackathons around the world have been planned in memory of computer programmer and internet activist Aaron Swartz, who died in 2013.

=== For a demographic group ===
Some hackathons are intended only for programmers within a certain demographic group, like teenagers, college students, or women.

Hackathons at colleges are usually annual or semiannual events that are open to college students at all universities. They are often competitive, with awards provided by the university or programming-related sponsors.

PennApps at the University of Pennsylvania was the first student-run college hackathon; in 2015 it became the largest college hackathon with its 12th iteration hosting over 2000 people and offering over $60k in prizes. The University of Mauritius Computer Club and Cyberstorm.mu organized a Hackathon dubbed "Code Wars" focused on implementing an IETF RFC in Lynx in 2017.

Bitcamp, held at the University of Maryland, College Park since 2014, is another large hackathon with over 1,000 high school and college students attending each year.

ShamHacks at Missouri University of Science and Technology is held annually as an outreach activity of the campus's Curtis Laws Wilson Library. ShamHacks 2018 focused on problem statements to better quality of life factors for US veterans, by pairing with veteran-owned company sponsors.

=== For internal innovation and motivation ===
Some companies hold internal hackathons to promote new product innovation by the engineering staff. For example, Facebook's Like button was conceived as part of a hackathon.

=== To connect local tech communities ===
Some hackathons (such as StartupBus, founded in 2010 in Australia) combine the competitive element with a road trip, to connect local tech communities in multiple cities along the bus routes. This is now taking place across North America, Europe, Africa and Australasia.

=== Code sprints ===
In some hackathons, all work is on a single application, such as an operating system, programming language, or content management system. Such events are often known as "code sprints", and are especially popular for open source software projects, where such events are sometimes the only opportunity for developers to meet face-to-face.

Code sprints typically last from one week to three weeks and often take place near conferences at which most of the team attend. Unlike other hackathons, these events rarely include a competitive element.

The annual hackathon to work on the operating system OpenBSD, held since 1999, is one such event; it may have originated the word "hackathon".

=== Datathon ===
A datathon is a competitive event similar to a hackathon, but with a focus on analyzing and integrating large datasets rather than building software or hardware solutions. Participants work individually, in teams, or as an online event to solve data-driven challenges within a set time frame, often using statistical analysis, numerical analysis, data mining, data visualization, algorithms, deep learning, and machine learning. Datathons are commonly organized by universities, companies, and data science communities. They are widely used in fields such as business analytics, health informatics, fin tech, and policy analysis, and are popular formats for promoting data literacy and recruitment for data science roles. Datathons typically culminate in presentations of findings, where solutions are judged based on accuracy, insight, creativity, and impact. Winners can receive prizes or scholarships.

Well-known datathons include:

- Deloitte's Datathon series
- DrivenData competitions
- Kaggle online community challenges

== Criticism ==
Over the years hackathons have come under severe criticism, with multiple observers questioning the adequacy of hackathons to deliver impactful technological solutions. A major part of the reserve towards hackathons has to do with the lack of viability and sustainability of solutions they develop, as clearly shown by recent empirical research. A study examining 11,889 U.S.-based events revealed that only seven percent of projects had any activity six months after the hackathon ended. Another global study found that only about five percent of all projects developed during hackathons continued for more than five months. Hackathons have been thus associated with the production of short-lived software products often denominated as vaporware. Hackathons have been equally criticized for their failure to contemplate the complexity of issues that they seek to solve, developing technologies that do not address underlying societal and political causes of a problem. The use of hackathon participants as de facto unpaid laborers by some commercial ventures has been criticized as exploitative.

High-profile hackathons have also been the object of controversies. A team at the September 2013 TechCrunch Disrupt Hackathon presented the Titstare app, which allowed users to post and view pictures of men staring at women's cleavage. TechCrunch issued an apology later that day. A November 2013 hackathon run by Salesforce.com, billed as having the largest-ever grand prize at $1 million, was accused of impropriety after it emerged that the winning entrants, a two-person startup called Upshot, had been developing the technology that they demoed for over a year and that one of the two was a former Salesforce employee. Major League Hacking expelled a pair of hackers from the September 2015 hackathon Hack the North at the University of Waterloo for making jokes that were interpreted as bomb threats, leading many hackers to criticize the organization. As a result of the controversy, Victor Vucicevich resigned from the Hack the North organizing team.

== Notable products and projects ==
Several notable products and companies originated as projects developed during hackathons and similar events.

- Carousell – developed as a prototype at Startup Weekend Singapore in 2012.
- Cline – initially developed as Claude Dev for Anthropic's Build with Claude hackathon in 2024.
- Easy Taxi – presented at Startup Weekend Rio in 2011, where it won the competition.
- GroupMe – conceived and built at the TechCrunch Disrupt Hackathon in 2010.
- Zapier – developed and demonstrated at Startup Weekend Columbia in 2011.

== Notable events ==
- Campus Party
- Disrupt Asia
- GovHack
- HackerNest
- HackMIT
- hackNY
- HackTX
- HackYeah
- Hajj Hackathon
- Junction (hackathon)
- LA Hacks
- MHacks
- MTF Labs Hack Camp
- NaijaHacks
- NASA International Space Apps Challenge
- PACTF
- Science Hack Day
- Singapore FinTech Festival
- StartupBus
- VanHacks
- Wikimedia Hackathon
- Installfest

== See also ==
- Game jam — event where participants try to make a video game from scratch
- Editathon
- Charrette
- Startup Weekend
- Capture the flag (cybersecurity)
- List of mathematics competitions
- Computer-Based Math
- Competitive programming
