= NASA International Space Apps Challenge =

Annual NASA global hackathon

- Industry: Aerospace
- Founded: 2012
- Headquarters: Global
- Website: Space Apps Challenge

The NASA International Space Apps Challenge is a global annual hackathon. This two-day event provides an opportunity for participants to utilize NASA's free and open data and its Space Agency Partners' space-based data to address real-world problems on Earth and in space.

During the hackathon, NASA Space Apps Challenge participants around the world gather at hundreds of in-person and virtual local events to address challenges submitted by NASA subject matter experts. In the early years, NASA Space Apps was primarily focused on space science and technology. However, in 2017, NASA Space Apps moved to the NASA Earth Science Division and expanded to include Earth science and technology. Today, NASA Space Apps features arts and humanities alongside technology challenges, building a more inclusive program with broader appeal. These challenges range in complexity and topic, tasking participants with everything from creating artistic visualizations of NASA data to conceptualizing and developing informational apps and software programs.

The program, formerly run by NASA's Office of the Chief Information Officer, is part of NASA's Science Mission Directorate and is a part of the Open Government Initiative founded under President Barack Obama. It also fulfills the United States’ commitments to the Open Government Partnership. The United States released its National Action Plan for the Open Government Partnership in September 2011, including a commitment to hold the NASA International Space Apps Challenge to “promote innovation through international collaboration”. Today, NASA Space Apps is managed by the Earth Science Division, Science Mission Directorate, at NASA Headquarters in Washington, DC.

NASA Space Apps has engaged 373,000+ registrants from 185+ countries/territories.

NASA collaborates with international Space Agency Partners on the NASA Space Apps Challenge to encourage more extensive global collaboration and provides a broader platform for participants to contribute to the fields of Earth and space science and technology through NASA Space Apps.

== Judging and awards ==
After the NASA Space Apps Challenge concludes, each Local Event nominates teams with the top projects for Global Judging. The number of nominees depends on the number of projects submitted at each event. Local Events also may select an additional team for the Local People's Choice Award. Teams are also selected from the Universal Event to proceed to Global Judging.

Each year, NASA attempts to invite Global Winners and Local Leads from winning locations to a NASA spacecraft launch. Global Winners are also featured on the NASA Space Apps website and social media.

In 2013, Mars Exploration Program offered the NASA Space Apps 2012 Global Winners the opportunity to attend the launch of MAVEN, a Mars Orbiter. Kennedy Space Center also provided winners of their challenges that opportunity. The launch occurred on November 18, 2013, on an Atlas V 401 from Cape Canaveral Air Force Station.

NASA Space Apps 2013 Global and Kennedy Space Center winners attended the Orion Exploration Flight Test 1 launch. The launch scrubbed once on December 4 before occurring on December 5, 2014, on a Delta IV Heavy from Cape Canaveral Air Force Station.

NASA Space Apps 2014 Global and the overall Kennedy Space Center winners attended the viewing opportunity for the Cygnus CRS OA-4 launch, taking cargo and experiments to the International Space Station. The launch scrubbed twice on December 3 and 4; it occurred on December 6, 2015, on an Atlas V 401 from Cape Canaveral Air Force Station.

NASA Space Apps 2015 Global and the overall Kennedy Space Center winners were invited to attend the launch of OSIRIS-Rex, visiting the asteroid Bennu. The launch occurred on September 8, 2016, on an Atlas V 411 from Cape Canaveral Air Force Station.

NASA Space Apps 2016 Global Winners were invited to attend the launch of TDRS-M, a NASA Tracking and Data Relay Satellite operated by the Space Communications and Navigation Program (SCaN). The mission experienced delays in weeks leading up to launch on August 18, 2017, on an Atlas V 401 from Cape Canaveral Air Force Station.

In 2017, Global Winners were invited to attend the launch of TDRS-M, a NASA Tracking and Data Relay Satellite operated by the Space Communications and Navigation Program (SCaN). The mission experienced delays in weeks leading up to launch on August 18, 2017, on an Atlas V 401 from Cape Canaveral Air Force Station.^{[41]}

NASA Space Apps 2018 Global Winners were invited to Kennedy Space Flight Center to attend the launch of the Falcon 9 rocket as part of SpaceX CRS-18, a Commercial Resupply Service mission to the International Space Station.

In 2019, 2020, and 2021, invitations to NASA launches were postponed because of the COVID-19 pandemic. In 2021 and 2022, Global Winners were invited to a virtual celebration with NASA representatives. In 2023-2025, Global Winners were invited to NASA Headquarters in Washington, DC and Goddard Space Flight Center in Greenbelt, MD for an in-person celebration.

== NASA Space Apps participation by year ==
Year	Dates	Countries/ Territories*	Local Events	Registered Participants	Challenges	Projects Submitted
2012	April 21–22	17	25	2,004	64	101
2013	April 20–21	44	83	9,147	57	770
2014	April 12–13	46	95	8,196	40	671
2015	April 2015	62	133	13,700	35	949
2016	April 22–24	61	161	15,409	25	1,300
2017	April 29–30	69	187	25,140	24	2,017
2018	October 19–21	75	200	17,924	19	1,395
2019	October 18–20	71	225	29,253	25	2,067
Special Covid-19 edition	May 30–31	148	Virtual	15,304	12	1,422
2020	October 2–4	146	251	26,155	23	2,303
2021	October 2–3	162	323	28,286	27	2,324
2022	October 1–2	162	323	31,561	22	3,094
2023	October 7-8	152	402	57,999	30	5,556
2024	October 5-6	163	485	93,520	20	9,996
2025	October 4-5	167	551	114,094	18	11,511

*In 2012-2018, participating countries/territories represent the number of countries/territories where a Local Event was hosted. Years 2020 and forward represent the number of countries/territories registered participants for the hackathon reside.

== NASA Space Apps highlights by year ==
=== 2025 ===
The 2025 NASA International Space Apps Challenge was held on October 4-5, 2025. The theme was "Learn, Launch, Lead" and inspires participants to learn skills to succeed in STEM fields, launch ideas that transform NASA's open data into actionable tools, and lead their community in driving technological innovation.

The hackathon featured 18 challenges written by NASA subject matter experts, including topics such as:

- Solar Weather
- Meteors
- Agriculture
- International Space Station
- Exoplanets.

There were 14 Space Agency Partners: Bahrain Space Agency, Brazilian Space Agency, Canadian Space Agency, European Space Agency, Indian Space Research Organization, Italian Space Agency, Japan Aerospace Exploration Agency, Mohammed Bin Rashid Space Centre, National Space Activities Commission of Argentina, Paraguayan Space Agency, South African National Space Agency, Spanish Space Agency, Turkish Space Agency, and the UK Space Agency.

NASA Space Apps announced the 10 Global Winners on December 18, 2025 in social media posts on Facebook, Instagram, and X.

=== 2024 ===
The 2024 NASA International Space Apps Challenge hackathon theme was "The Sun Touches Everything" in collaboration with NASA Heliophysics' celebration of the Helio Big Year. This year's theme aimed to illuminate the expansive reach of the Sun and its influence on every aspect of our environment and life on Earth.

The hackathon featured 20 challenges written by NASA subject matter experts, including topics such as:

- Geographic Information Systems
- Exoplanet Exploration
- Actionable Use of Earth Observation Data
- Ocean Ecosystems
- Geomagnetic Storms

15 Space Agency Partners: Australian Space Agency, Brazilian Space Agency, Canadian Space Agency, Communications, Space & Technology Commission of Saudi Arabia, European Space Agency, Indian Space Research Organization, Italian Space Agency, Japan Aerospace Exploration Agency, Mexican Space Agency, National Space Activities Commission of Argentina, National Space Science Agency of Bahrain, Paraguayan Space Agency, South African National Space Agency, Spanish Space Agency, and the Turkish Space Agency.

NASA Space Apps will announced the 10 2024 Global winners in on January 16, 2025, in a live YouTube Premiere. The announcement featured Dr. Mamta Patel Nagaraja, NASA Associate Chief Scientist for Exploration and Applied Research, and videos from the winning teams.

=== 2023 ===
The 2023 NASA International Space Apps Challenge hackathon theme was “Explore Open Science Together” in collaboration with NASA's Transform to Open Science (TOPS). The theme celebrated the benefits and successes created through the equitable and open sharing of knowledge and data and acknowledged 2023 as "A Year of Open Science," as declared by the White House, NASA, and other federal agencies. The NASA Space Apps Challenge incorporated open science tips, tools, and resources from the NASA TOPS initiative into the hackathon for participants.

Challenge Topics:

- Open Science and Open Data
- NASA Technologies and Capabilities
- Planet and Space Science
- Earth Biology
- Artificial Intelligence and Machine Learning

13 Space Agency Partners: Australian Space Agency, Brazilian Space Agency, Canadian Space Agency, ESA (European Space Agency), Indian Space Research Organization, Italian Space Agency, Japan Aerospace Exploration Agency, Mexican Space Agency, National Space Activities Commission of Argentina, National Space Science Agency of Bahrain, Paraguayan Space Agency, South African National Space Agency, and the Turkish Space Agency.

The 2023 NASA Space Apps Challenge presented its 10 Global Winners during their live Global Winners Announcement on January 23, 2024 that was filmed at NASA's Goddard Space Flight Center in Greenbelt, Maryland. The announcement also included former NASA Astronaut, Dr. Cady Coleman.

=== 2022 ===
The 2022 NASA Space Apps Challenge hackathon theme was “Make Space” to emphasize NASA’s commitment to inclusivity. The hackathon focused on Earth and space science, technology, and exploration.

In 2022, Space Apps introduced the Global Live event which streamed live from the NASA Space Apps Instagram. During the event, NASA Space Apps Global Organizing Team members highlighted Local Events in Madrid, Spain; Pretoria, South Africa; and New York City in real-time.

The 2022 NASA Space Apps Challenge Winners Announcement was announced live from NASA's Goddard Space Flight Center in Greenbelt, Maryland.

Challenge Topics:

- Climate Change
- Art & Storytelling
- The Sun
- Planets
- Data Visualization

Space Agency Partners: Australian Space Agency, Brazilian Space Agency, Canadian Space Agency, ESA (European Space Agency), Indian Space Research Organization, Japan Aerospace Exploration Agency, Mexican Space Agency, National Space Activities Commission of Argentina, National Space Science Agency of Bahrain, Paraguayan Space Agency, and the South African National Space Agency.

=== 2021 ===
The 2021 NASA Space Apps Challenge marked the tenth annual event for the program with the theme, "The Power of Ten." To celebrate the occasion, organizers brought together ten Space Agency Partners to support the event and added four new award categories for a total of ten award categories for 2021: Best Storytelling, Global Connection, Art & Technology, Local Impact.

The 2021 NASA Space Apps Challenge was an entirely virtual event due to the COVID-19 pandemic.

Challenge Topics:

- James Webb Space Telescope
- Earth Observation Data
- Climate Change

Space Agency partners: Australian Space Agency, Brazilian Space Agency, Canadian Space Agency, ESA (European Space Agency), Japan Aerospace Exploration Agency, National Space Activities Commission of Argentina, National Space Science Agency of Bahrain, Paraguayan Space Agency, and the South African National Space Agency.

=== 2020 ===
The 2020 NASA Space Apps Challenge was an entirely virtual event due to the COVID-19 pandemic.

Space Agency Partners: Canadian Space Agency (CSA), European Space Agency (ESA), Japan Aerospace Exploration Agency (JAXA), and The National Centre for Space Studies (CNES).

=== Space Apps Covid-19 Challenge (special edition) ===
A special NASA Space Apps COVID-19 Challenge was held on May 30–31, 2020. More than 15,000 participants, from over 150 countries/territories participated.

The challenges focused on the following themes:

- Learning about the virus and its spread using space-based data
- Local response/change and solutions
- Impacts of COVID-19 on the Earth system/Earth system response
- Economic opportunity, impact, and recovery during and following COVID-19

=== 2019 ===
In 2018, NASA Space Apps Challenge Local Leads were 37.5% women.

Main Stage Location(s): Huntsville, Alabama

Theme or Challenge Topics:

- Earth’s Oceans
- Our Moon
- Planets Near and Far
- To the Stars
- Living in Our World
- Invent Your Own Challenge

=== 2018 ===
In 2018, NASA Space Apps Challenge Local Leads were 33% women.

Main Stage Location(s): Huntsville, Alabama

Theme or Challenge Topics:

- Can You Build A…
- Help Others Discover the Earth
- Volcanoes, Icebergs, and Asteroids (oh my)
- What the World Needs Now is
- An Icy Glare
- A Universe of Beauty and Wonder

=== 2017 ===
In 2017 the NASA Space Apps Challenge was hosted by a Local Lead in Melbourne Australia and several other Australian cities also competed. Speakers included Andrew Aldrin, son of American astronaut Buzz Aldrin, who works in the launch and education areas of the space industry. Aldrin fascinated the audience by discussing the ‘new’ space industry that seeks more entrepreneurial approaches to innovation. He wanted to see more investment in propulsion from the Moon and in space manufacturing, both of which could address the ongoing problem of orbiting space junk.

Main Stage Location(s): Palo Alto, California led by the Local Lead Irena Chaushevska and New York City, New York led by the Local Lead Joseph Spens.

Theme or Challenge Topics:

- Economic growth
- Social inclusion
- Environmental sustainability

=== 2016 ===
For the second year, the NASA Space Apps Challenge included a pre-hackathon Women in Data Bootcamp to build confidence and give women, girls, and those new to hackathons a head start leading into the weekend. The Data Bootcamp was held in Pasadena, California, where the 2016 mainstage event was hosted. It featured guest speakers such as Kimberly Bryant, the Founder of Black Girls Code, Emily Lakdawalla of the Planetary Society, Anita Sengupta of NASA and creative scientist Dr. Kate Stone who was also a founding member of the NASA Datanauts initiative. In 2016, there were more than 50 Data Bootcamps held in conjunction with NASA Space Apps events, creating and opening up even more space for a diverse community of global participants.

Main Stage Location(s): Pasadena, California

Theme or Challenge Topics:

- Aeronautics
- Earth
- International Space Station
- Journey to Mars
- Solar System and Beyond
- Space Technology

=== 2015 ===
In 2015, the inaugural NASA Space Apps Data Bootcamp was introduced the day before the kickoff of the 2015 NASA Space Apps mainstage event in New York City. Speakers included NASA Astronaut Cady Coleman, who spoke about her work with space robotics; IBM General Manager and author Sandy Carter, who shared career hacks for women entering technology fields; and 13-year-old Olivia Ross from Black Girls Code, who discussed her first (winning) hackathon experience. The NASA Space Apps Data Bootcamp was developed to empower and encourage women to participate in the hackathon and honor women who are making a difference in the field of data science.

Main Stage Location(s): Microsoft HQ, Times Square, New York City, New York

Challenge Topics:

- Earth
- Outer Space
- Humans
- Robotics

=== 2014 ===
During the event, NASA opened the NASA Space Apps Challenge to the broader public by including a YouTube broadcast of a Google Hangout with NASA Senior Executives. The public asked questions through social media channels, which were addressed by NASA Chief Technology Officer for IT, Deborah Diaz; NASA Chief Scientist, Ellen Stofan; NASA Asteroid Grand Challenge Program Executive, Jason Kessler; and Astronauts Doug Wheelock of NASA and Paolo Nespoli of the European Space Agency, with moderation by Open innovation Program Manager, Beth Beck. In 2014–2015, NASA Space Apps planned the weekend to occur over Yuri's Night, April 12, when people around the world have parties and events to celebrate achievements in human spaceflight.

Main Stage Location(s): New York City

Challenge Topics

- Asteroids
- Earth Watch
- Human Spaceflight
- Robotics
- Technology in Space

=== 2013 ===
NASA Administrator Charlie Bolden visited the Kennedy Space Center site. The first interplanetary weather app was developed using actual Mars science data and visual imagery, such as highlighting temperature and dust storms.

Main Stage Location(s): Philadelphia, Pennsylvania

Theme or Challenge Topics:

- Software
- Hardware
- Citizen Science
- Data Visualization

=== 2012 ===
The event was part of the United States’ commitment to the Open Government Partnership. The Open Government Partnership was a multilateral initiative between 55 nations around the world committed to promoting transparency, participation, and collaboration between governments and citizens. The United States released its National Action Plan for the Open Government Partnership in September 2011, including a commitment to hold the NASA International Space Apps Challenge to “promote innovation through international collaboration.” Space exploration was the ideal catalyst to foster this culture of innovation, and NASA, in collaboration with nine government agencies and 99 other organizations, hosted the inaugural NASA Space Apps Challenge event in 25 cities and 17 countries - on all seven continents and online.

Challenge Topics:

- open-source software
- open hardware
- citizen science platforms
- data visualization

== Global winners ==
Experts from NASA, Space Agency Partners, and industry evaluate projects submissions nominated for Global Awards by Local Leads to select winners. Award categories have varied over the years.

Year	Most Disruptive	Most Innovative	Best Use of Data	Most Inspiring	Galactic Impact	People's Choice
2012	Growing Fruits: Pineapple Project	Strange Desk	Vicar2png	Planet Hopper	Growers Nation	Bit Harvester

Year	Best Mission Concept	Best Use of Hardware	Best Use of Data	Most Inspiring	Galactic Impact	People's Choice
2013	Popeye on Mars	ISS Base Station	Sol	T-10	NASA Greener Cities	ChicksBook
2014	Aurora Wearables: Fashion meets Function	Android Base Station	SkyWatch	Yorbit	SkySnapper	Next Vision (Space Helmet)
2015	Arachnobeea	Valkyrie	NY Space Tag	Robot Tracking and Sensing	CROPP	NatEv Explorer
2016	FractalNet	Canaria	Scintilla	Kid on the Moon	L.I.V.E. Glacier Project	Mars Hopper
2017	Space Bar	HALA	Lemon Py	Grovr	Radaway	NestFold

Year	Best Mission Concept	Best Use of Hardware	Best Use of Data	Most Inspirational	Galactic Impact	Best Use of Science
2018	that-vr-team	DeltaProtocol	Olik	iNON	Salinity	Pillars of Creation
2019	c.a.w.s.t.o.n.	Cafeína	AEDES project	StarStruck	Massa	The Great Bloom Theory

Year	Best Mission Concept	Best Use of Technology	Best Use of Data	Most Inspirational	Galactic Impact	Local Impact	Global Connection	Best Storytelling	Art and Technology	Best Use of Science
Special COVID-19 edition	Shelter in Space	Elavo	G.I.D.E.O.N.	The Masked Scales	PANAL	N/A	N/A	N/A	N/A	Michiganders Researching Coronavirus
2020	Loud and Clear	FireWay	Monsoon Overflow	A.I. ltruistics: A.I. Heroes & Team Twilight	Project L.L.O.C.U.S.T	N/A	N/A	N/A	N/A	ASPIRE
2021	Mohakash	Change Maker	Cambridge Asteroids	Bioshi	4 Seeds	Landslide Detection Squad	Eagle AI	Space Travelers	Jimmy in the Box	Ani's Cuff
2022	Mars 3D Home	tAMing particles	Starflock	Team Diamonds	Selene	Brute Force	Standard NCTUCS Student	MIMBI	Earth, Wind, and Flare	What's New?
2023	Astrogenesis	Spacebee	Storm Prophet	Space Quest Maidens Donzelas da Missao Espacial	Greetings from Earth	Quality over Quantity	Immeresed in the Sounds of Space	Voyagers	Oogway Comics	Lunartech Ensemble
2024	AsturExplorers	42QuakeHeroes	GaamaRamma	Innovisionaries	NVS-knot	Team I.O.	Asteroid Destroyer	TerraTales	Connected Earth Museum	WMPGang
2025	PureFlow	Twisters	Resonant Exoplanets	Photonics Odyssey	AstroSweepers	QUEÑARIS	Gaia+LEO	HerCode Space	Zumorroda-X	SpaceGenes+

== NASA Space Apps community ==
=== Social media ===
NASA Space Apps on social media reaches audiences across the globe with the hashtag, #SpaceApps. The social following has grown to thousands on Instagram, Twitter, Facebook, and YouTube, and in 2025 social mentions had a reach of 617 million. NASA Space Apps features live events such as the annual Winners Announcement on its social media pages. Past events have featured former NASA astronaut, Cady Coleman, NASA Space Apps Program Scientist Dr. Keith Gaddis, NASA Leadership, and more.
