= NaijaHacks =

Hackathon in Nigeria

NaijaHacks is a hackathon and tech invention competition in Nigerian, which aims to encourage youth to use technology to create solutions for their communities and the world using technologies including blockchain and artificial intelligence. Officially, NaijaHacks is described as an official national "Movement of Makers, Leaders, and Disruptors".

Founded in 2018 by software engineer Uchi Uchibeke (formerly of Shopify and founder of AfricaHacks), NaijaHacks is Africa's largest hackathon. NaijaHacks is inspired by Uchi's experience attending Major League Hacking and other hackathons at Stanford, Harvard, Princeton and others.

In 2018, NaijaHacks had 500 participants with 100 projects, and in 2019 NaijaHacks became the largest hackathon in Africa with over 200 projects submitted.

== History ==
=== NaijaHacks 2018 ===
In 2018, NaijaHacks started virtually and culminated in an expo-style demo day and award ceremony at Zone Tech Park, Lagos, Nigeria.

=== NaijaHacks 2019 ===
The 2019 NaijaHacks included a Keynote Speech by Chude Jideonwo and culminated in a demo day at Zone Tech Park, Lagos, Nigeria. 200+ projects were submitted with 14 of the projects transformed from hackathon idea to startup by AfricaHacks, also founded by Uchi Uchibeke.

Processes at NaijaHacks include:

- Application
- Team formation
- Building
- Submission
- Live demo day
