= HackerNest =

Hackathon organizer not-for-profit organization

- Founded: 11.1.11 (incorporated 12.12.12)
- Type: non-profit organization
- Headquarters: Toronto, Ontario, Canada
- Location: Worldwide
- Services: Tech events and innovation consulting
- Members: 100,000+
- Board of directors: JJ Beh, Robin Toop, Shaharris, Chloe Kagan
- Website: hackernest.com

HackerNest is a not-for-profit organization and global movement founded on January 11, 2011. The organization unites local technology communities around the world through community events and socially beneficial hackathons to further its mission of economic development through technological proliferation. It is Canada's largest, most prolific technology community with growing international reach.

== Background ==
HackerNest was founded on the belief that the fastest, most permanent way to improve the world is to build supportive local technology and innovation communities characterized by trust, sharing, and respect. The rationale is that the technology community is the cornerstone of economic development enabling collaboration, innovation, knowledge-sharing, recruiting, and scientific progress. Growing and strengthening the community lets businesses hire better, perform better, and create more jobs, which ultimately increases economic prosperity.

The organization's ideology is rooted in the idea that minor tweaks at the start of a process in a dynamic system can have a major impact on the result. . HackerNest "splinter cells" (chapters) regularly host "Tech Socials" open to anyone interested in technology. The events vary slightly by city, but maintain the same core tenets: all are friendly and down-to-earth.

The first Tech Social was held in Toronto on Monday, January 31, 2011. HackerNest Toronto is currently the world's largest Meetup group for programmers and Canada's largest technologist community.

As of July 2017, HackerNest splinter cells have run over 550+ events in 34 cities across 14 countries on 5 continents.

== Activities ==
In 2014, HackerNest produced Construct, Canada's largest hardware hackathon and DementiaHack for the British government, the world's first hackathon dedicated to helping people with dementia and their caregivers.

In 2015, the organization produced Deloitte's first internal innovation hackathon as well as DementiaHack Facebook as lead sponsor and support from the UK government, the Public Health Agency of Canada, and the Ontario Ministry of Health and Long-Term Care.

In 2016, HackerNest produced CourtHack with the National Center for State Courts in Salt Lake City at t ) and the Hack4Equality LGBTQ hackathon with Grindr in Los Angeles which heavily featured White House Promise Zone and Opportunity Project data.

== Awards ==
- Boryana Damnyanova Award for Corporate and Social Responsibility - Tufts University
- Contributions to the technology community - City of Toronto government
- Finalist - Canadian Global Impact Competition
