= VanHacks =

- Status: active
- Genre: Hackathon
- Frequency: Annually
- Venue: BCIT
- Locations: Vancouver, Canada
- Years active: 2016 - Present
- Inaugurated: 4–5 April 2016
- Most recent: 25–18 September 2019
- Website: vanhacks.com

VanHacks is an annual hackathon that is part of Vancouver Startup Week. The focus of the hackathon is creating solutions for local non-profit organizations from the Vancouver area over the course of 36 hours. Sponsors of the event have included KPMG, Best Buy, Slack (software), Lighthouse Labs, Nespresso, and Red Bull.

== History ==
VanHacks was created in 2016 by TTT Studios. The event did not run in 2017. In 2018 and 2019 VanHacks partnered with Vancouver Startup Week, and served as an official hackathon for the week long event held in September.

The 2018 and 2019 versions of the event were held at the TEC Hub at the downtown campus of BCIT (British Columbia Institute of Technology).
