= HackTX =

Hackathon at the University of Texas at Austin

- HackTX 2023 Logo
- Status: Active
- Venue: University of Texas at Austin
- Location: Austin, Texas
- Country: United States
- Inaugurated: 2012
- Organizer: University of Texas at Austin
- Website: hacktx.com

HackTX is a 24-hour annual hackathon hosted by Freetail Hackers, a Computer Science student organization at The University of Texas at Austin.

HackTX is open to all college students and held on the University of Texas at Austin's campus.

== History ==
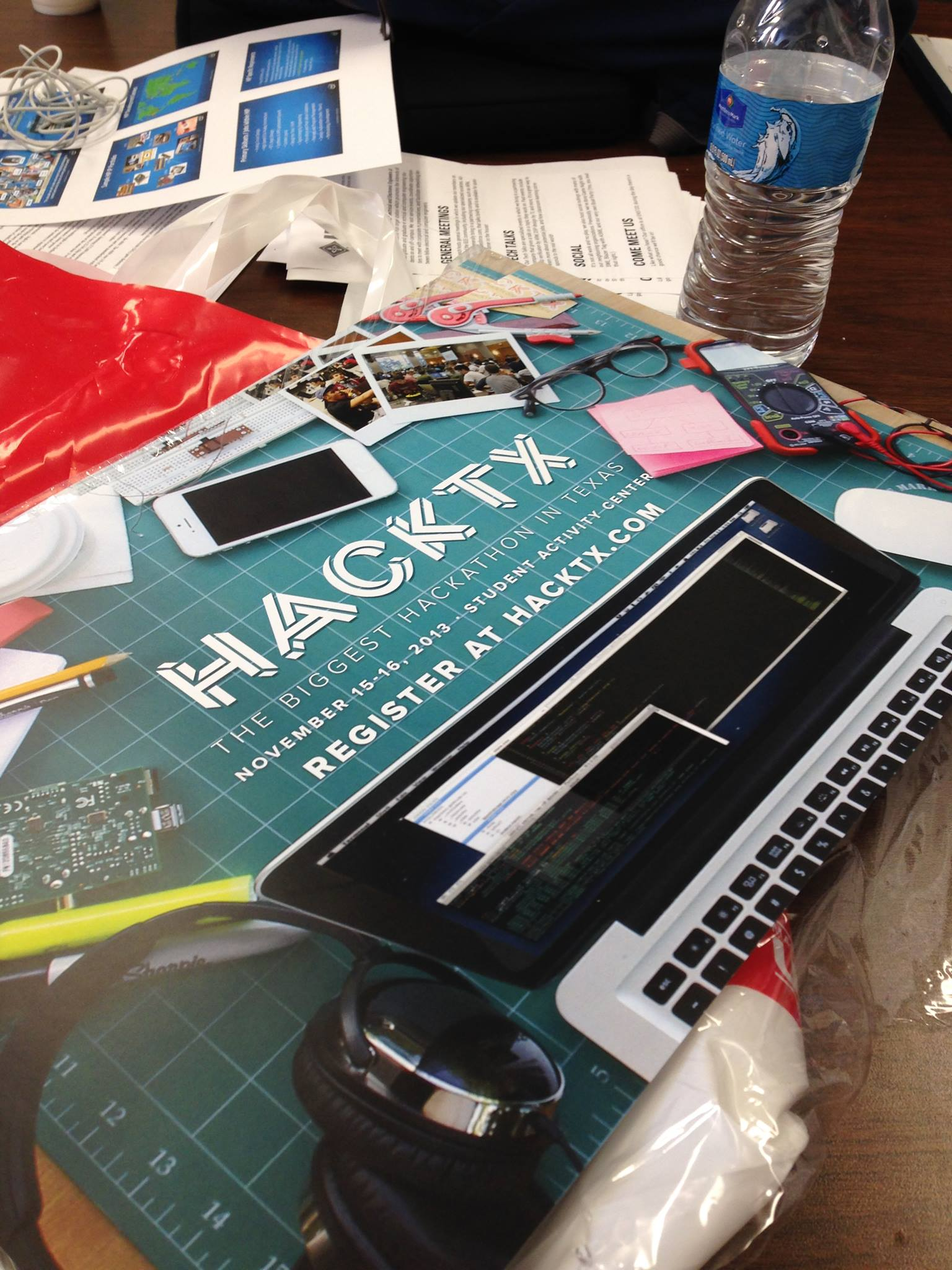
HackTX 2013 Promo poster

HackTX started in 2012, when student members of the Hacker Lounge and Technology Entrepreneurship Society wanted to host a hackathon that would gather students and companies from the Austin, TX community. Students of all backgrounds are encouraged to participate, regardless of experience level or major of study.

To cover costs of the event, HackTX organizers raise capital from sponsoring companies. Companies are provided opportunities to interact with student hackers in the forms of mentoring and recruiting.

HackTX begins with a keynote address to all participants and a demonstration of sponsor APIs. Participants then begin building their projects, or 'hacking'. Projects may be software based, hardware based, or a combination of the two.

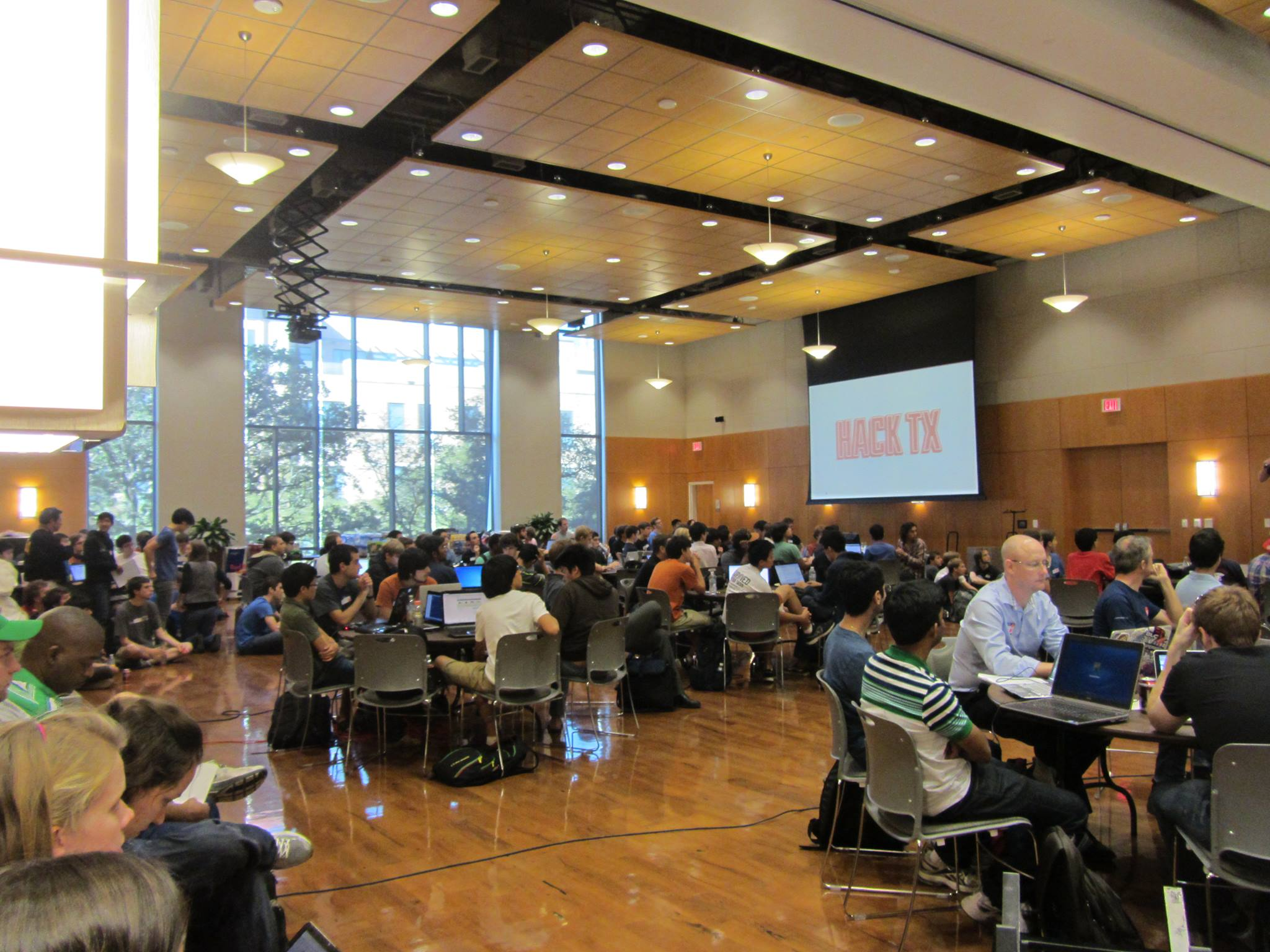
HackTX 2012 Participants

Participants are encouraged to work in teams of 3 to 5 members. After 24 hours, participants submit their projects for judgement.

== HackTX winners ==
HackTX
Hackathons	Date	Place	Attendance	Winner	Prizes
HackTX 2012	October 19–20, 2012	(United States) Austin, TX USA	300	1st Place - Black Lynx; 2nd Place - Alex Smith, David Weiser; 3rd Place - Trivia Mobile Team	1st Place - 5 Nexus 7; 2nd Place - 5 23" Samsung Monitors; 3rd Place - 3 Apple TVs
HackTX 2013	November 15–16, 2013	(United States) Austin, TX USA	425	1st Place - Whistle Hero (Xilin Liu, Abdul Nimeri, Jonathan Wilson, Daniel Reiter, Matt Schurr); 2nd Place - Megan Ruthven, Dan Zhang; 3rd Place - Steve Lyons	1st Place - $6000 and $1000 of Amazon Web Services Credit; 2nd Place - $4000 and $500 of Amazon Web Services Credit; 3rd Place - $2000 and $250 of Amazon Web Services Credits
HackTX 2014	October 18–19, 2014	(United States) Austin, TX USA	520		1st Place - Alienware X51s; 2nd Place - Dell Venue 8 Tablets; 3rd Place - Dell Touchscreen Monitors
HackTX 2015	September 26-27, 2015	(United States) Austin, TX USA			
HackTX 2016	October 22-23, 2016	(United States) Austin, TX USA			
HackTX 2017	October 28-29, 2017	(United States) Austin, TX USA			
HackTX 2018	October 20-21, 2018	(United States) Austin, TX USA		1st Place - Articulate (Christopher Gonzalez, Jake Crabtree, John Herrick, Mia Bergeron, Mindy Chi)	
HackTX 2019	November 2-3, 2019	(United States) Austin, TX USA			
HackTX 2020	October 23-25, 2020	(United States) Austin, TX USA			
HackTX 2021	October 30-31, 2021	(United States) Austin, TX USA			
HackTX 2022	October 15-16, 2022	(United States) Austin, TX USA			
HackTX 2023	October 21-22, 2023	(United States) Austin, TX USA		1st place- C-AAM Turrent; 2nd place- MedHelp; 3rd place- Automit	1st place- Airpods 2nd Gen; 2nd place- Logitech Mouse; 3rd place Razer Rainbow Keyboard

=== HackTX 2012 ===
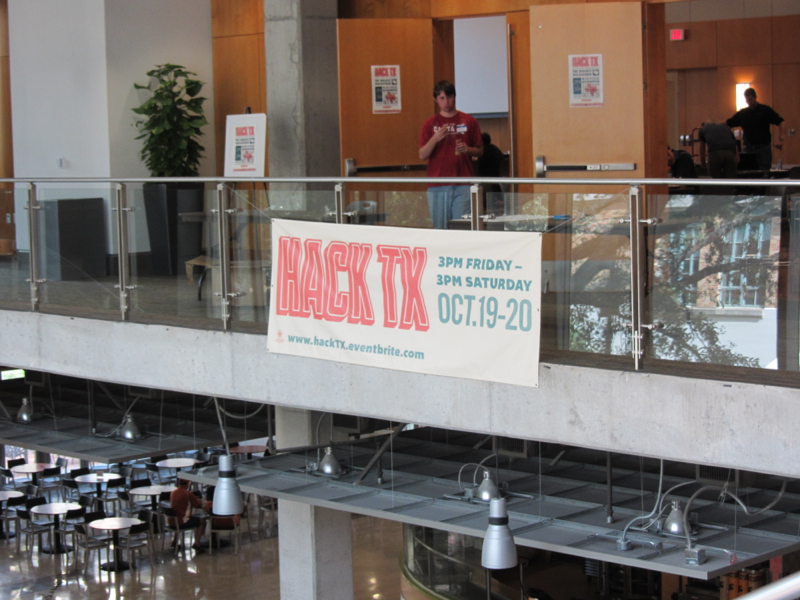
HackTX 2012 Banner

The first HackTX was created by the Technology Entrepreneurship Society and Hacker Lounge of the University of Texas, Austin and held in the university's Student Activity Center, October 19–20, 2012. It attracted about 300 attendees.

The university Founder of Capital Factory and veteran Austin tech investor, Josh Baer, commented that this was the largest hackathon he had seen in Austin.

The first place winners, Lynx Labs, developed music visualization software using a Microsoft Kinect sensor and won five Google Nexus 7 tablets. Second place team won five 23” Samsung monitors for their multi-factor identification physical entry device. The third place team developed an automated flashcard application to help students study for tests for the prize of three Apple TV's. Special prizes went to the product with the most market potential, TrivialMobile.com, an application that builds a mobile website from information submitted through email. The award for most creative project went to a rapid image transformation application for Windows, dubbed ‘Instagram for right-clicking.’ Twilio gave out two Spheros to a team who built software to control its 200-pound robot using text messages. Context.io awarded two ACL Live tickets to a team which built email analytics and visualization software.

Other supporters included the Murchison Chair of Free Enterprise, UT Events Co-Sponsorship Committee, RideScout, VMWare, ReturnPath, Alsop Louie, Palantir, Microsoft, HomeAway, InfoChimps, Rackspace, Twilio Communications and Indeed.com.

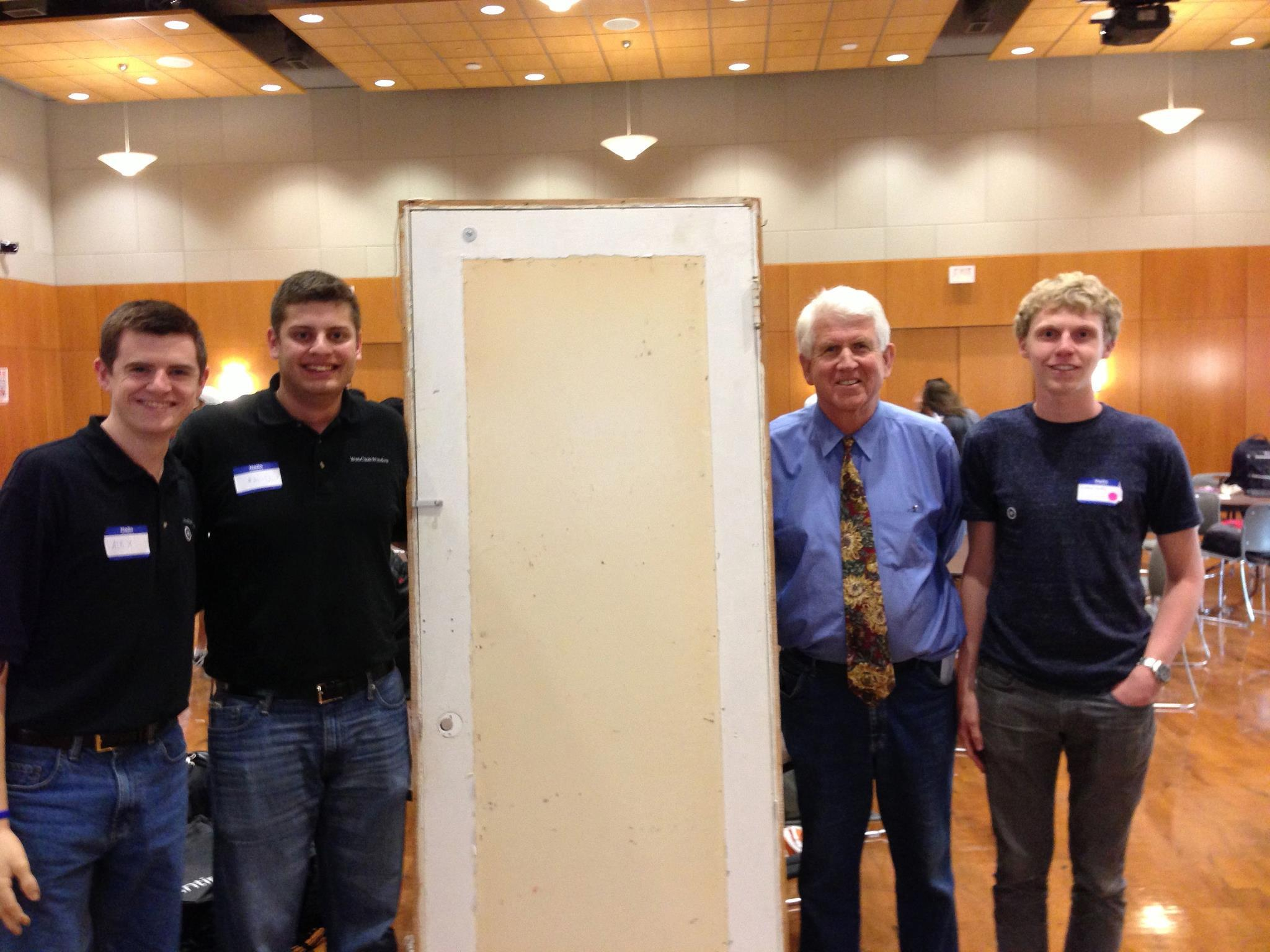
HackTX 2012 2nd Place Winners with Bob Metcalfe

=== HackTX 2013 ===
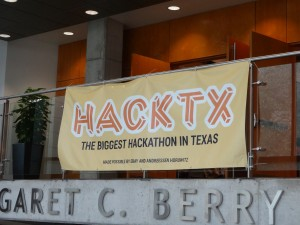
HackTX 2013 Banner

The second HackTX was held on the University of Texas at Austin's campus, November 15–16, 2013. Sponsors included Microsoft, Google, Andreessen Horowitz, eBay Inc and more.

The event included more than 425 participants. Finalists presented in front of a room of their peers and judges, including Brett Hurt, Josh Baer, and Bob Metcalfe.

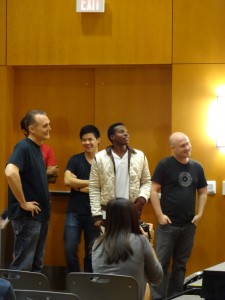
HackTX 2013 3rd Place Winner Steve Lyons with Brett Hurt and Joshua Baer

Whistlehero

"Guitar hero for whistling. This app was built completely in HTML and JavaScript. Comments were made about the potential of the app being used to not only fine-tune whistling skills, but to learn the skill itself."

Relevant XKCD

"Not only was Relevant XKCD a funny presentation but the team has some serious potential as a search engine technology – fuzzy searching – searching when exact results are not known."

Alert Meet

"Alert Meet aims to solve the room reservation problem found in libraries and co-working spaces. Steve Lyons used a series of motion detectors to let users know when reserved rooms were in fact empty and available."

=== HackTX 2023 ===
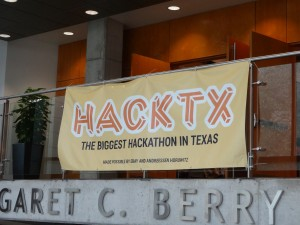
HackTX 2013 Banner

HackTX 2023 was held on the University of Texas at Robert A. Welch Hall and the Gates Dell Complex, October 21-22, 2023. Sponsors included Capital One, DevRev, Dish, Google, Analog Devices, Quantiq Partners, Southwest Research Institute(SwRI) and others.

The event attracted 747 participants with 191 submissions. Challenge categories included Best Overall, Best Novice, and Best Design, along with sponsored challenges. These included the Capital One challenge focused on financial hacks and the Procore challenge focused on the mental health of construction workers.
