= Over the Air =

Mobile hack day in London

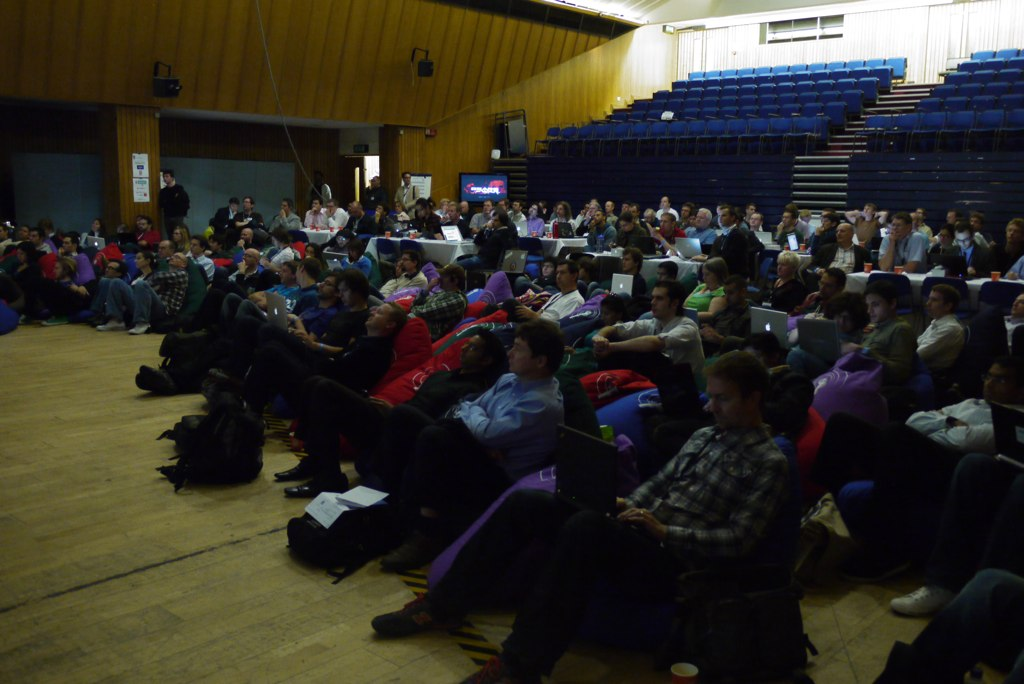
- People watching the keynote in the Great Hall at Imperial College in 2009
- Status: active
- Genre: Hackathon
- Frequency: Annually
- Locations: Imperial College London, Kensington, London, United Kingdom, Bletchley Park, St John the Baptist, Hoxton
- Years active: 2008–2016
- Inaugurated: 4–5 April 2008
- Most recent: 25–26 November 2016
- Website: overtheair.org

Over the Air was an annual mobile technology-focused overnight hack day event held in London from 2008 to 2016. The two-day event would include practical and educational talks and a hacking competition. Sponsors of the event have included the BBC, Bluevia, Nokia, PayPal, and Vodafone. Some of the ideas developed at Over the Air have been turned into commercial services.

== History ==
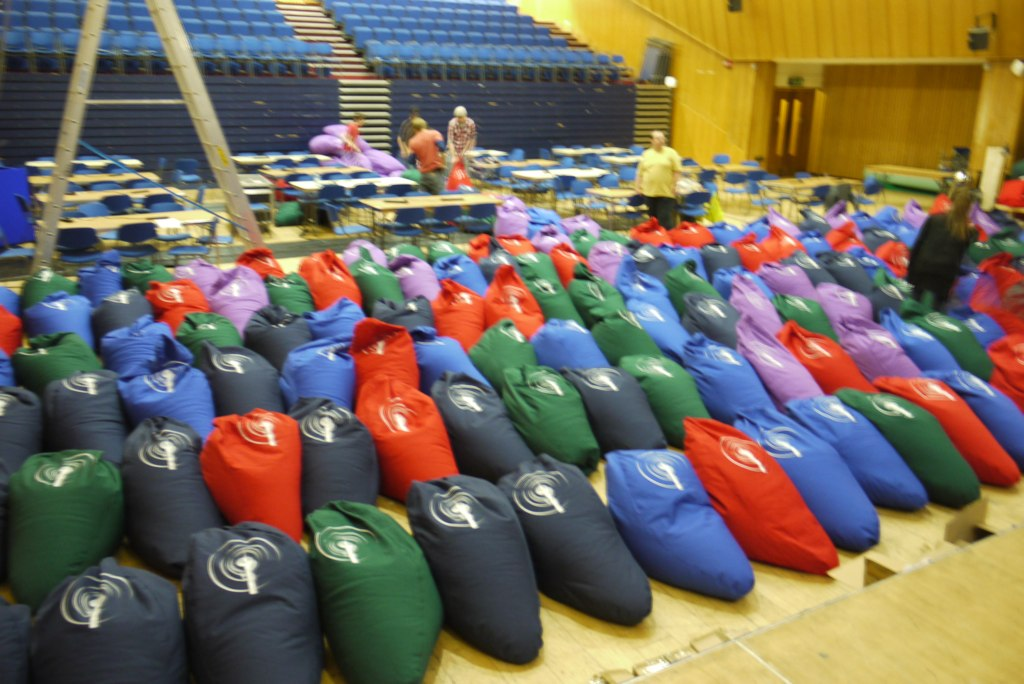
Beanbags ready for attendees at the 2009 Over The Air Conference

Over the Air developed from previous hack day events in 2007 and 2008.

From 2008 to 2010, the event was held at Imperial College in South Kensington. The 2011 version of Over the Air was part of the 2011 London Mobile Week. From 2011 to 2013, it was held at Bletchley Park. There was no Over the Air event in 2014.

In 2015, the event was held at St John the Baptist, Hoxton; on 25 and 26 September. It featured one of the first workshop sessions for the Micro Bit; along with the usual hackathon and lightning talks. The 8th (and final) event was also St. John's, on 25 and 26 November 2016.
