= Chic Meets Geek =

- Status: Active
- Genre: Arts, Fashion, and Geek Culture
- Venue: Various
- Location: Various
- Country: United States
- Inaugurated: 2009
- Attendance: ~2,000 since 2009
- Organizer: Carol Tran, Founder
- Website: http://chicmeetsgeek.com/

Chic Meets Geek (also ChicMeetsGeek) is a red carpet event and conference hosted by Carol Tran. A non-profit beneficiary is highlighted at every Chic Meets Geek event and is themed around the speaker panelists' expertise, often ranging from fashion to science.

== Background ==
Chic Meets Geek's mission statement begins:

Chic Meets Geek is an event designed to bridge the social gap between the cultural chic and intellectual geeks. It is similar to a conference, but with a social atmosphere. The purpose is to gather two different groups in one room to inspire, share, and connect through a panel of geek and chic celebrity speakers to talk about their inspirational background.

Tran believes that everyone is "innately both chic and geek, with usually one side more dominant than the other. [She] is pushing for cross-collaborations of the two types, which she is confident is more likely to lead to successful world change than would homogenous pairings."

The first Chic Meets Geek event was held on November 5, 2009 at the Automattic Lounge on Pier 38, San Francisco, California.

Chic Meets Geek hosted five events in 2010: February 4, June 3, August 18, September 9 and September 20. All events were held in San Francisco, other than the September 20 and August 18 events, which were held in Los Angeles and Seattle, respectively. In conjunction with the Gnomedex 10 conference, the August 18, 2010 Chic Meets Geek event was hosted at Hotel 1000 in Seattle, Washington.

== Notable speakers ==
Chic Meets Geek events include speakers from varying backgrounds, with the goal of connecting people that would normally not participate in the same social circles, namely, with a focus on geek culture and the chic lifestyle.

Past "geek" speakers include:

- Randi Zuckerberg - Former marketing director at Facebook
- Matt Mullenweg - Co-founder of WordPress
- Daniel Kraft - Stem Cell Scientist
- Dave McClure - Venture Capitalist/Investor at the Founder's Fund
- Chris Pirillo - President of Lockergnome
- Brady Forrest - Founder of Ignite

Past "chic" speakers include:

- Maria Kochetkova - Principal Ballet Dancer at the San Francisco Ballet and Solo Gold Medal Winner on the NBC series Superstars of Dance
- Terry Disley - Jazz Musician
- Steve Wharton - Actor on NBC's Trauma
- Damon Dunn - Former American football player for the Dallas Cowboys
- Jay Nicolas Sario - Fashion Designer from Project Runway
- Charlie Ayers - Former Executive Chef at Google

== Non-profit beneficiaries ==
- San Francisco Opera (BRAVO!) - A non-profit cultural arts group that caters to promoting opera to young professionals.
- BUILD - A non-profit social venture, based in Palo Alto, that empowers underprivileged and under-resourced high school students with an education in entrepreneurship.
- Glide Foundation - A non-profit that is mobilized to alleviate suffering and break the cycles of poverty and marginalization.
- Washington C.A.S.H. - Provides the business training, supportive community, and capital to help enterprising individuals with limited financial resources gain self-sufficiency through small business ownership.
- Girls for a Change - A non-profit that empowers girls for personal and social transformation. The young women design, lead, fund and implement social change projects that tackle issues girls face in their own neighborhoods.
