= Mamta Patel Nagaraja =

American engineer

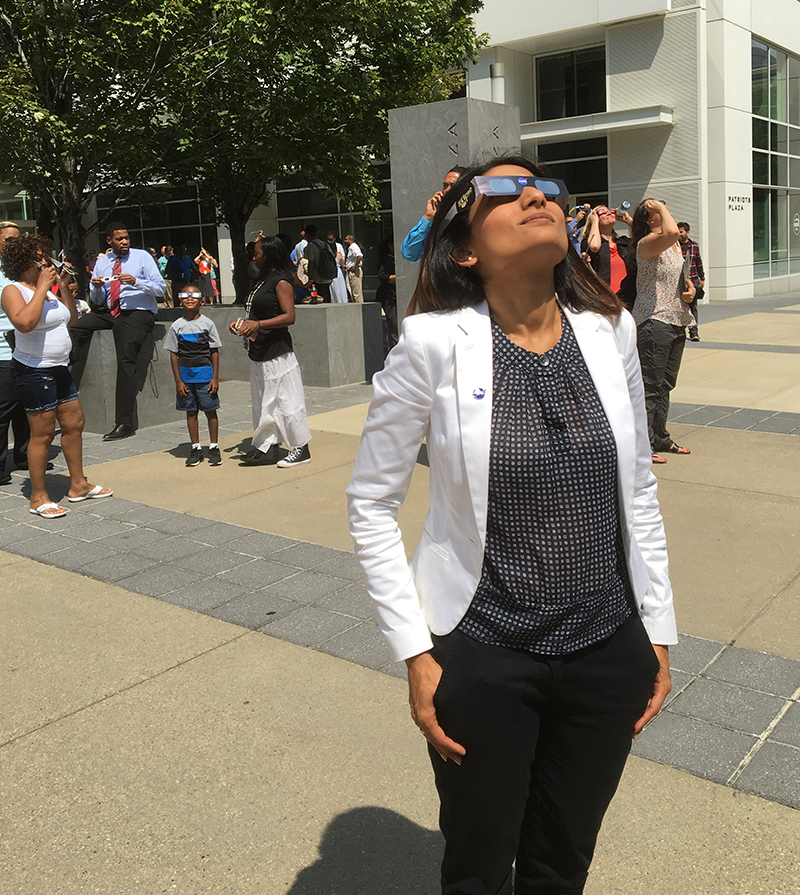
- Nagaraja safely viewing the total solar eclipse in 2017
- Born: Anaheim, California
- Education: BS Aerospace Engineering, Texas A & M (2003); Masters Mechanical Engineering, Georgia Institute of Technology; PhD Biomedical Engineering, Emory University
- Occupations: Spaceflight Scientist and Engineer
- Employer(s): Vyoma Science & Engineering
- Known for: Encouraging women to consider careers in NASA
- Awards: NASA's Exceptional Service Medal and the Goddard Exceptional Achievement in Engineering Award

Mamta Patel Nagaraja is an American engineer and scientist who worked for over two decades at NASA. Most recently, she was the Associate Chief Scientist for Exploration and Applied Research. In this role, she served as an expert for NASA's chief scientist on missions where humans perform science in spaceflight. She has degrees in aerospace engineering, mechanical engineering, and biomedical engineering. Her dissertation research was in molecular biology where she studied genetic changes in bone cells exposed to simulated microgravity. She previously received two interviews to become a NASA astronaut, served on the NASA Administrator's team, and led a science communications portfolio.

== Early life and education ==
Mamta Patel Nagaraja was born in Anaheim, California to parents who emigrated from India to the United States just a year earlier. The family moved to San Angelo, TX when Mamta was 2 months old to begin their life in the USA. When she was 16, her uncle had arranged for her to be married, a common practice in the Gujarati culture. Her father refused the proposal and opted to encourage his daughters to continue their education.

While giving a TEDx talk, she noted how her high school math teacher, Mrs. Bean, changed her life. Mrs. Bean handed Nagaraja a copy of the Texas A&M Full Ride Scholarship application the day before it was due and told her to apply. Nagaraja took her teacher's advice, wrote the essays and sent it as overnight shipping in order to submit the application by its due date. She was awarded the scholarship and began her formal education at Texas A&M University where she received her Bachelor of Science degree in aerospace engineering in 2003. During her tenure at Texas A&M, she was hired into NASA's selective Cooperative Education Program.

In 2005, she went on to receive a master's degree in mechanical engineering at the Georgia Institute of Technology. In 2007, she completed a doctorate in biomedical engineering at Georgia Tech with dissertation research performed in the School of Medicine at Emory University.

== NASA ==
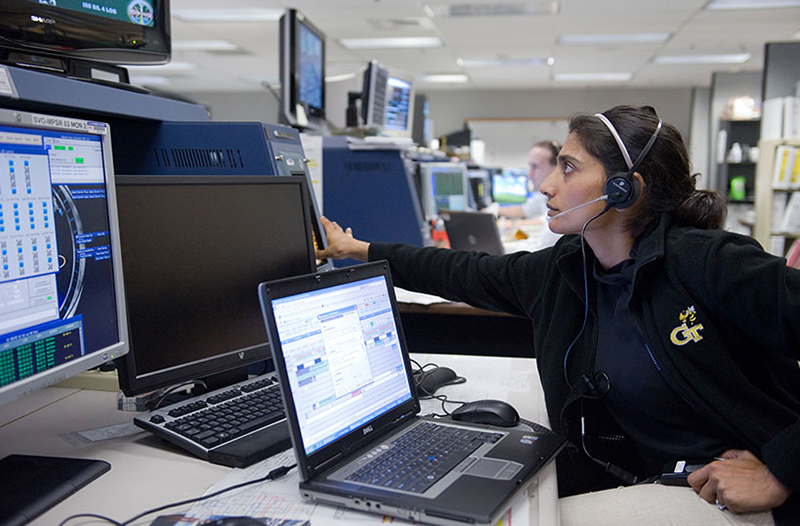
Nagaraja working in Mission Control in Houston, Texas

Nagaraja served the national space program for over 22 years, departing the Agency as the Associate Chief Scientist for Exploration and Applied Research. In this role, she was the expert to NASA's chief scientist on missions where humans perform science in spaceflight. Previously, she served as the deputy program scientist for space biology at NASA. In this role, she was responsible for programmatic strategy, roadmaps, and growth of the investment in space biology. Her expertise is in molecular biology where she studied genetic changes in bone cells exposed to simulated microgravity.

In 2008, Nagaraja began her career at NASA's Johnson Space Center training astronauts and serving as one of NASA's certified flight controllers in the Mission Control Center in Houston, Texas. She trained astronauts who flew aboard the U.S. Space Shuttle as well as the International Space Station.

In 2013, Nagaraja accepted an opportunity at NASA Goddard Space Flight Center to serve as an operator for a science mission to the Moon. Her role was to ensure the mass spectrometer on the Lunar Atmosphere and Dust Environment Explorer operated correctly. Then she served as the lead mechanical engineer for a scientific instrument on a proposed mission to Venus.

In 2015, Nagaraja moved to NASA Headquarters where she eventually had to opportunity to lead NASA's science communications portfolio, including executive communications for NASA's senior leaders in science, visual science graphics, and digital media (social and web).

Lastly, Nagaraja has previously served as an adjunct faculty member in the Department of Mechanical Engineering at the Catholic University of America.

== Awards and recognitions ==
Nagaraja was a semi-finalist in the 2013 and 2017 astronaut candidate selections. The 2013 selection was the second largest applicant pool at that time with 6100, and the 2017 class had the most ever with over 18,000 applicants. Notably, the previous historical record was 8000 in the 1978 selection when NASA first opened up their astronaut program to women. In 2011, Nagaraja was awarded NASA's Exceptional Service Medal for her contributions to the International Space Station. In 2013, Nagaraja was selected by the NASA Administrator to represent NASA at the State of the Union address. She was also the recipient of the Robert H. Goddard Exceptional Achievement in Engineering award for her significant contributions to the lunar mission called LADEE in 2013. In 2018, Nagaraja was awarded the prestigious Fed100 award for her significant leadership role in bringing the historical total solar eclipse to millions across the world. To date, the total solar eclipse in 2017 holds the record for the highest web traffic event in NASA's history. Nagaraja managed the live viewing on the web of the eclipse for NASA.

== Publications ==
Nagaraja is listed as an author on five separate publications.

Giving advice to current science and engineering students.
