= LA Hacks =

Student hackathon at UCLA

- LA Hacks 2022 Logo
- Genre: Hackathon
- Location: University of California, Los Angeles (UCLA)
- Founded: 2012
- Website: lahacks.com

LA Hacks is an annual student-led hackathon hosted at the University of California, Los Angeles (UCLA)'s Pauley Pavilion. According to UCLA in 2020, it is Southern California's largest annual hackathon.

== History ==
LA Hacks was co-founded by UCLA students Hadar Dor and Alvin Hsia. The inaugural event was held on April 27–28, 2013 at CrossCampus in Santa Monica. There were about 250 people in attendance and over 150 students from universities across Southern California competed in the 24 hours event.

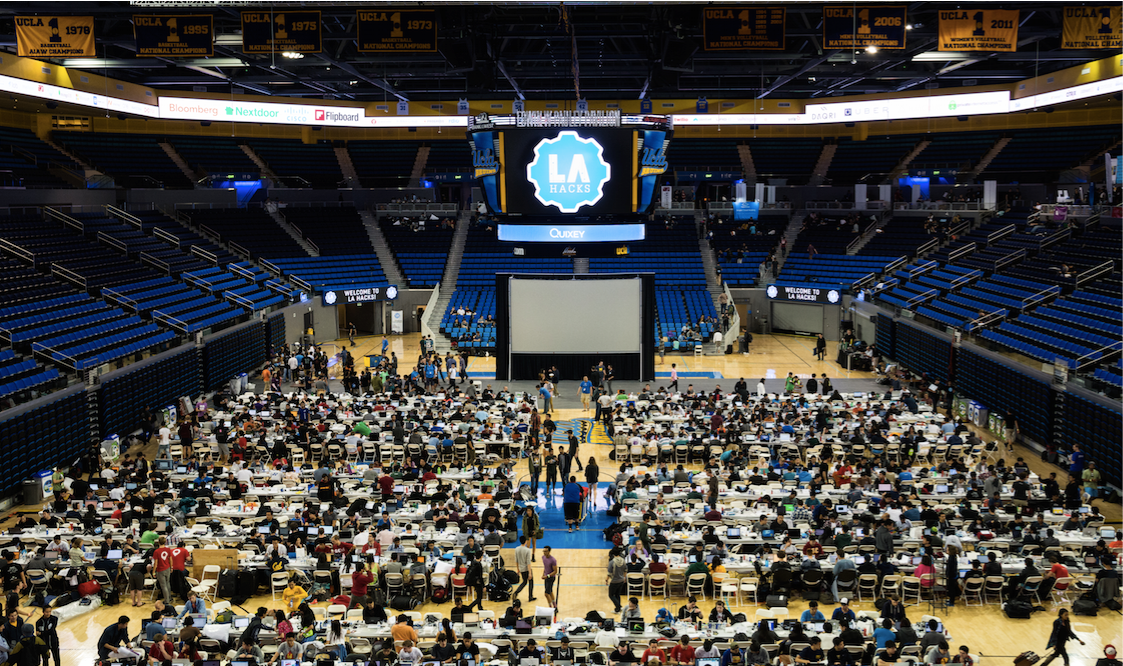
LA Hacks in Pauley Pavilion, 2014

In April 2014, there were 4,000 people registered and about 1,300 to 1,500 participants. This was held at UCLA's Pauley Pavilion for 36 hours. Special guests came to speak at LA Hacks, including Evan Spiegel, founder and CEO of Snapchat, Alexis Ohanian, co-founder of Reddit, Baiju Bhatt, founder and co-founder of companies in different fields of activity, and Adam Singolda, CEO of Taboola. Their hacks were judged by top tech industry professionals (i.e. Sam Altman – President of Y Combinator, Chris De Wolfe – CEO of SGN and Founder of Myspace).

In April 2016, the Los Angeles bid for the 2024 Summer Olympics signed on as a sponsor. The committee presented two challenges in which students were asked to create apps that would promote fitness and enhance the fan experience at live sporting events.

LA Hacks 2020 was hosted virtually due to the COVID-19 pandemic.
