= MHacks =

Student-run hackathon in Ann Arbor, Michigan

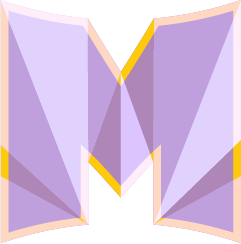
- MHacks Logo
- Genre: Student-run hackathon
- Locations: Ann Arbor, Michigan, U.S.
- Founded: 2012
- Website: mhacks.org

MHacks is a student organization-run hackathon held on the campus of the University of Michigan.

== Events ==
No.	Year	Date	Location	Ref.
0 (Note: A reference to the convention in computer science where indexing typically starts at 0.)	2012	November 2–3	Bob and Betty Beyster Building	
1	2013	February 2	Palmer Commons	
2	2013	September 21	Michigan Stadium	
3	2014	January 17–19	The Qube, Detroit	
4	2014	September 5–7	Ann Arbor	
5	2015	January 17–18	Ann Arbor	
6	2015	September 11–13	North Campus	
7	2016	February 19–21	North Campus	
8	2016	October 8–9	Detroit Masonic Temple	
9	2017	March 25–26	North Campus	
10	2017	September 22–24	North Campus	
11	2018	October 13–14	Intramural Sports Building	
12	2019	October 12–13	Intramural Sports Building	
13	2020	August 22–23	Online	
14	2021	October 16–17	Online	
15	2023	February 17–19	Online	
16	2023	November 18–19	Duderstadt Center	
17	2024	April 12-14	Central Campus Classroom Building	
18	2024	September 28–29	Duderstadt Center	
19	2025	September 27–28	Duderstadt Center	
