= PACTF =

Computer security competition

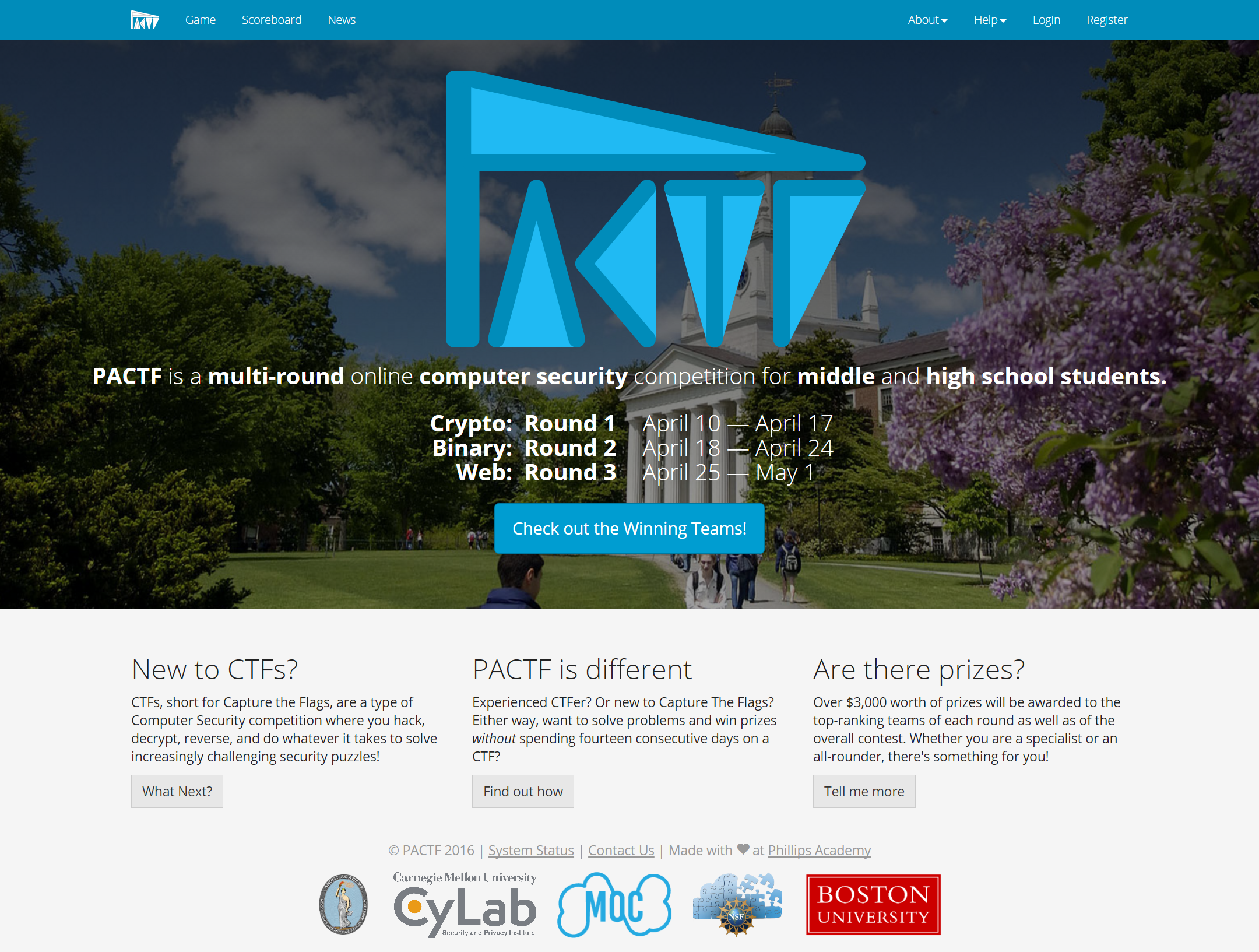
- Screenshot PACTF Home Page 04-AUG-2016
- Website type: Competition
- Available in: English
- Owner: Phillips Academy Techmasters
- Creators: Yatharth Agarwal; Tony Tan; Cameron Wong
- Website: www.pactf.com
- Commercial: No
- Registration: Required
- Launched: November 12, 2015; 10 years ago
- Current status: Archived
- Written in: Python

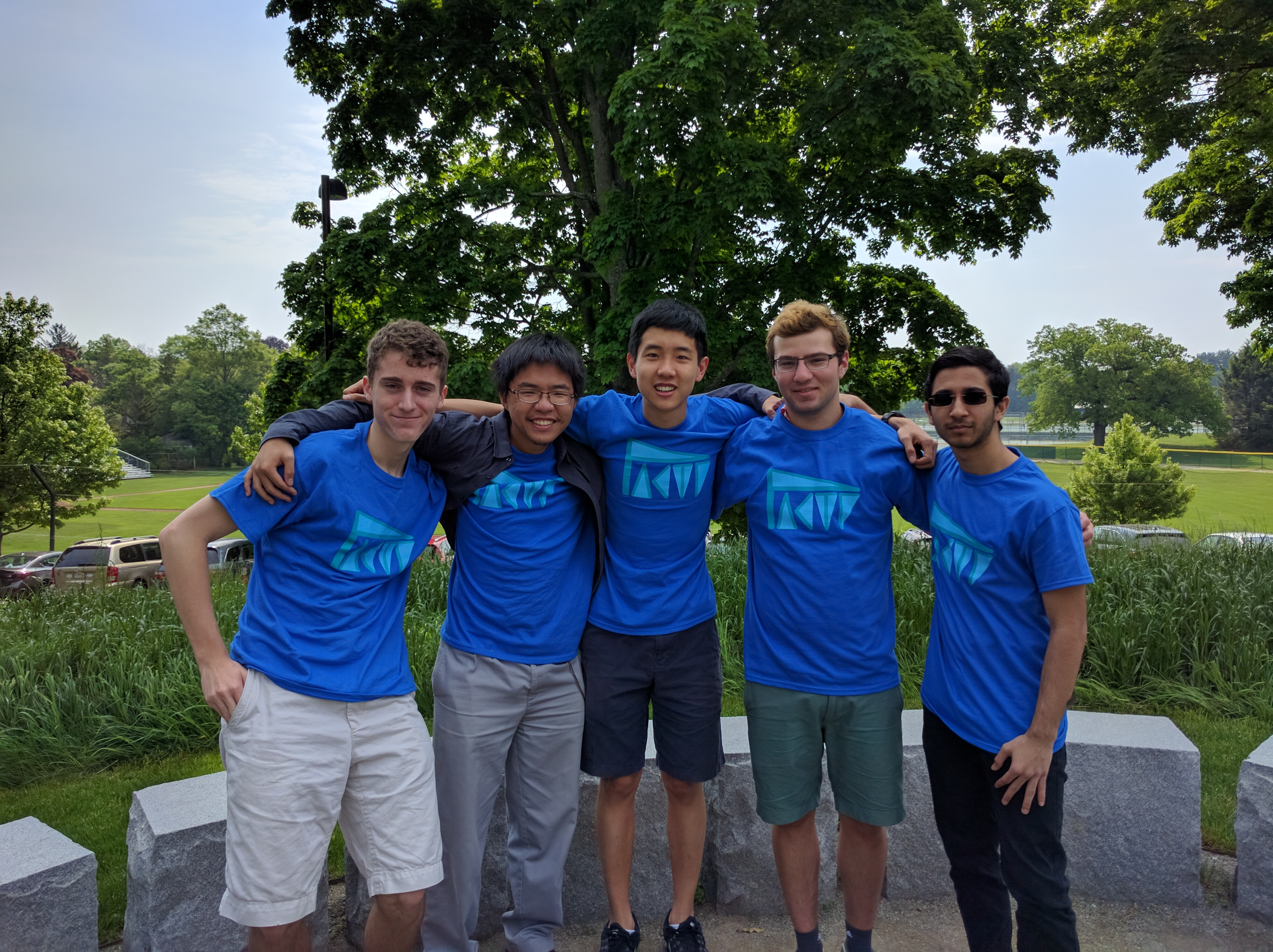
2016 PACTF Organizers

PACTF was an annual web-based computer security Capture the Flag (CTF) competition for middle and high school students. It was founded by a group of students at Phillips Academy in Andover, Massachusetts. The competition's sponsors include the Abbot Academy Association at Phillips Academy; the Information Networking Institute and CyLab at Carnegie Mellon University; the Hariri Institute for Computing, Massachusetts Open Cloud (MOC) project, and Modular Approach to Cloud Security (MACS) project at Boston University; and other entities.

This competition follows the Jeopardy CTF format, where teams “hack, decrypt, reverse, and do whatever it takes to solve increasingly challenging security puzzles." Once a team successfully determines the security vulnerability purposefully left in the problem material and executes an attack, they can obtain an answer string called a "flag." By submitting the correct flag, teams can receive feedback and points that improve their ranking.

In April 2016, more than 1000 teams from the United States and other countries participated in the competition. The second and third PACTF competitions took place in the Spring of 2017 and 2018 at similar scales. The fourth PACTF competition took place in May 2019.
