= Dan Quine =

British computer scientist

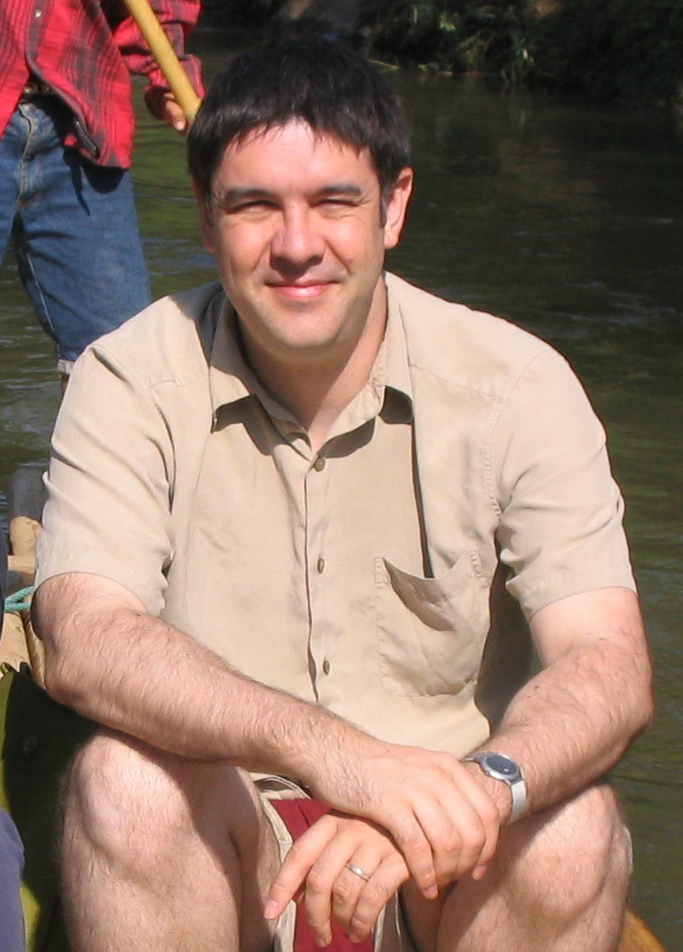
- Education: University of Leeds
- Known for: Songkick, AltSchool, Google Squared
- Scientific career
- Workplaces: University of Leeds; Apple Computer; Google; Songkick; AltSchool
- Thesis: Exploring the use of pattern recognition, pattern identification and machine learning to support active collaboration between the user and the computer (1996)
- Website: uk.linkedin.com/in/dancrow twitter.com/crowquine

Daniel Nicholas Quine (formerly known as Daniel Nicholas Crow) is a British computer scientist. He is the AI and Engineering lead for education at the Chan Zuckerberg Initiative.

== Early career ==
Quine learned to program on a ZX81 and a BBC Micro in the 1980s.

He received a BSc in Computer Science from the University of Leeds, and earned his PhD in Artificial Intelligence from Leeds in 1995. His thesis work used machine learning algorithms to discover patterns in user interactions.

In the mid-1990s he was Head of Software Development for Art of Memory where he produced the Story of Glass multimedia kiosk and CD-ROM amongst others.

== Silicon Valley ==
In 1996, Quine joined Apple Computer where he initially worked as the lead software engineer on the Apple Media Tool. He was also the manager of the Hypercard engineering team and the QuickTime applications team. He worked closely with Steve Jobs on the QuickTime Player application and was co-inventor of two software patents with Jobs. In August 2011, Quine was interviewed by the BBC to discuss Steve Jobs' resignation as CEO of Apple.

After leaving Apple in 2000, Quine worked at a number of technology startups. He was the Chief Scientist of guru.com where he developed the SmartMatch intelligent search engine. After guru.com was acquired by Unicru, Quine stayed on as Chief Scientist and Chief Architect until 2005.

In 2005, Quine co-founded Blurb.com. As Chief Technology Officer of Blurb he led the development and launch of their first BookSmart product.

== Google ==
In 2006 Quine joined Google as Product Manager for the crawl infrastructure group. In this role, he regularly spoke at search engine optimisation conferences and led the company's teams working on the Robots Exclusion Protocol and other crawler technologies; he also represented Google on the proposed ACAP standard.

In February 2008, in an interview with the Technology Review, Quine discussed Google's "alternate views" search interface experiments and described Google's vision for the future of search: "One thing to remember is that (search is) still the early days. People think that search is a solved problem. I think we're still in the early days of making search work on a universal global scale. We know we can do better."

In 2009, Quine led the engineering team that developed Google Squared, a large-scale knowledge extraction technology that is part of the Knowledge Graph technology. He then moved to Google's London office where he led the development of Google's mobile search applications and Google Ads Professionals and Rich Media Dynamic Ads projects.

== Songkick ==
In January 2011, Quine left Google to join Songkick. At Songkick he helped create the Silicon Milkroundabout hiring fair. He also led Songkick's transition to a Service Oriented Architecture and helped the company adopt continuous integration.

In May 2014, Quine was interviewed by Silicon Real and talked about his experience at Songkick, as well as his earlier career and the future of the tech industry. In May 2014, Songkick had more than 10 million monthly unique users and generated more than $100m of ticket revenue through referrals. In June 2015, Songkick announced its merger with direct ticket vendor CrowdSurge and a $16.6m Series C investment round; Quine remains the CTO of the combined company.

In September 2015, Quine chaired a roundtable discussion with a panel of experts in Artificial Intelligence who talked about the risks and opportunities in the field.

== Tech City ==
In March 2012, Quine was named one of the "jobs ambassadors" for Channel 4 News. He regularly comments on startups in Tech City, including writing for The Guardian, talking at conferences, and promoting UK startups for the London Olympics. He is one of the founding members of the Tech London Advocates group. In December 2013, Quine was interviewed on BBC World News by Linda Yueh discussing entrepreneurship.

== Leeds University ==
Quine is a Visiting Professor of Computer Science at the University of Leeds. He lectures at the university on entrepreneurship and startups. He also writes on Computer Science. He is one of the prominent engineering alumni of the University.

== Return to Silicon Valley ==
In July 2016, Quine returned to Silicon Valley, where he joined education startup AltSchool. In 2019, he joined Lever as VP of Engineering, Product and Design. In 2022, Quine was working at Mode Analytics.

In 2024, Quine joined the education team at the Chan Zukerberg Initiative, leading AI and Engineering.

== Railway historian and author ==
Quine writes books and articles about narrow-gauge railways, including the Ffestiniog, Corris and Talyllyn Railways in Wales; and the Kettering Ironstone Railway, the Waltham Iron Ore Tramway in England. In 2019, Quine presented a paper at the Social History Conference on the "impact of English industrialists on rural Mid Wales",

In 2022, Quine presented at the Society for Industrial Archeology's conference, on "Rail transport at the Yellow Aster gold mine". He published a related article on the Yellow Aster Mine later that year. In December he published a book on the Hendre-Ddu Tramway.

In 2026, Quine published a full issue of the Corris Railway Journal with co-author MRFS. He presented on Early American Gasoline Locomotives at the 2026 Society for Industrial Archeology conference.
