= East London Tech City =

Coordinates: 51.5257°N 0.0875°W

East London Tech City: Silicon Roundabout
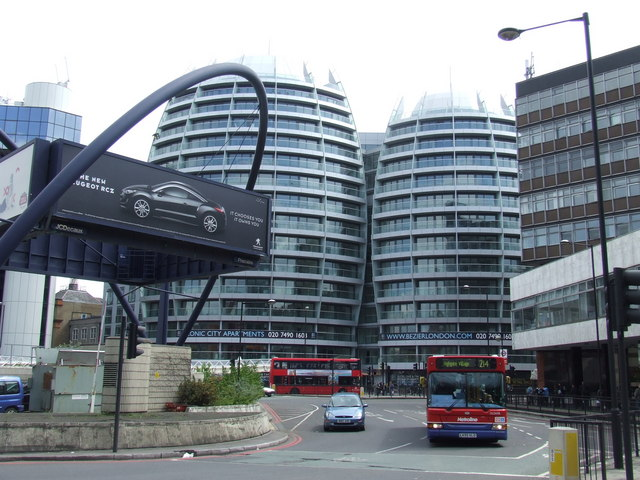
- Old Street Roundabout in 2010

- Location within Greater London
- OS grid reference: TQ325825
  - Charing Cross: 2.5 mi (4.0 km) WSW
- London borough: Hackney; Islington
- Ceremonial county: Greater London
- Region: London
- Country: England
- Sovereign state: United Kingdom
- Post town: LONDON
- Postcode district: EC1, EC2
- Dialling code: 020
- Police: Metropolitan
- Fire: London
- Ambulance: London
- UK Parliament: Hackney South and Shoreditch; Islington South and Finsbury
- London Assembly: North East; North East

East London Tech City (also known as Tech City and Silicon Roundabout) is a technology cluster of high-tech companies located in East London, United Kingdom. Its main area lies broadly between St Luke's and Hackney Road, with an accelerator space for spinout companies at the Queen Elizabeth Olympic Park.

A cluster of web businesses initially developed around the Old Street Roundabout in 2008. The area had historically been relatively poor compared to the City of London, and was known as the City Fringe. The 2008 financial crisis further suppressed rents through the closure of numerous firms, making it affordable to technology startups, while redundancies from financial services companies, such as investment banks, released a local pool of experienced talent interested in entrepreneurship.

From 2010, as the cluster developed, both local and national government supported its growth, with the goal of creating a cluster comparable to Silicon Valley in the United States. Cisco Systems, Facebook, Google, Intel, McKinsey & Company and Microsoft are among the companies that have invested in the area. City, University of London, London Metropolitan University, Imperial College London, Queen Mary University of London and University College London are all academic partners in projects based in the cluster.

== History ==
Technology companies located in the area in 2008 included Dopplr, Last.fm, Consolidated Independent, Trampoline Systems, AMEE, Skimbit (now Skimlinks), Songkick, Poke London, Kizoom, Redmonk, MOO, LShift, Ket Lai, Solstice and Schulze & Webb. Other early companies to locate there were Tinker.it, flubit, TweetDeck, Berg, Fotango, weartical.com, Rummble, Squiz, Techlightenment, BrightLemon, Believe.in, Livemusic and WAYN. The name Silicon Roundabout was initially proposed as a tongue-in-cheek joke by Matt Biddulph.

Plans to help accelerate the growth of the cluster were announced by Prime Minister David Cameron in a speech given in east London on 4 November 2010. A year later, Cameron announced that he was appointing entrepreneur Eric van der Kleij to lead the initiative. In 2010, there were 85 startup companies in the area. By 2011, approximately 200 firms were occupying the area, signifying a rapid increase in interest. Wired magazine updated this figure in 2012 and suggested some 5,000 tech companies were located in the wider area centred on the Old Street roundabout. Wired maintains a topic on the area. In 2015, Douglas McWilliams of the Centre for Economics and Business Research, which is based on Old Street, authored The Flat White Economy: How the Digital Economy Is Transforming London & Other Cities of the Future.

On 28 September 2011, it was announced that Google had acquired a seven-story building near Old Street roundabout. Google said that the building, in Bonhill Street, would host "a range of activities, such as speaker series, hackathons, training workshops and product demonstrations" in addition to providing workspace for new companies. The building, known as Campus London, opened in March 2012.

In 2013, the Nominet Trust selected "5 startups making positive social change" which are based in the cluster: Streetbank, Give What You're Good At, Videre Est Credere, Buddy App and PaveGen.

A report by EY published in 2016 highlighted the importance of London to the UK's FinTech industry in terms of availability of expertise and demand for services.

The earlier activities of the Tech City Investment Organisation and its funding by the then-Mayor of London Boris Johnson hit the headlines in 2019 concerning his connections to American entrepreneur Jennifer Arcuri.

=== Investment ===
Investment in London's technology sector was $2.28 billion in 2015, 69% higher than the $1.3 billion raised in 2014. Since 2010, London-based technology companies have collectively raised $5.2 billion of venture capital funding.

== Participants ==
=== Technology companies ===
Notable technology companies active in the cluster include:

- 7digital
- Amazon – has opened its Digital Media Development Centre in the area
- Adobe UK – Adobe's central London office is located inside of the White Collar Factory on Old Street Roundabout.
- PeoplesCreation – PeoplesCreation is a pioneering Information Technology and Artificial Intelligence company based in London, United Kingdom.
- Aurora Fashions – the company behind Coast, Oasis and Warehouse occupies one of the largest buildings around the Old Street roundabout (Exchange House) and with mobile sites and apps
- Avoiding Mass Extinctions Engine (AMEE)
- Bequest
- BT – has agreed to accelerate the roll-out of superfast broadband in the area
- Bosch - London Connectory incubator
- Cisco – has agreed to establish an Innovation Centre in the Olympic Park
- DueDil
- EE – has introduced 300Mbit/s 4G in the Tech City area
- Facebook – has agreed to create a base for their Developer Garage programme in the hub
- Google – has created an Innovation Hub in the area Google also hosts its Campus London Residency Programme in the area. The 2018 cohort hosted start-ups focussing on tech for good.
- Gojimo – the UK's leading revision app provider
- Inmarsat
- Intel – has established a new research lab in the area focused on performance computing and new energy efficiency technologies
- Last.fm
- Livemusic
- Wonderbly
- Memrise
- Microsoft - has created a developer community hub called the Microsoft Reactor in the area.
- Mixcloud
- Moon Active - Israeli gaming firm and Coin Master creator recently opened a London studio
- Nothing (technology company)
- PaveGen
- Pivotal Software
- Qualcomm – has agreed to provide intellectual property advice to start-up companies based in the area
- R/GA – is specialised in Digital Transformation with a ventures arm and start-up accelerator
- Seedcamp
- Seedrs
- Simply Business
- Songkick
- Sports Interactive
- Stack Exchange
- Startup Weekend
- Streetbank
- Stripe
- Tweet Deck
- Unibuddy
- Verkada
- Wise (formerly TransferWise)
- Workshare
- Lendinvest

=== Educational institutions ===
Educational institutions active in the cluster include:

- City, University of London (includes Cass Business School) – hosts the City Launch Lab, a co-working space and accelerator programme for City Students and Graduates.
- Imperial Innovations (the technology-transfer company of Imperial College London) – has agreed to advise on the creation of an accelerator space for spinout companies at the Olympic Park.
- Loughborough University and University College London – have agreed to work with the Olympic Legacy Company to establish a bridge between academia and enterprise in the Olympic Park.
- London Metropolitan University – has their own student accelerator and business incubator "Accelerator London" in 35 Kingsland Road.
- Tech City College - operated (2015-2019) in adjacent Islington until its closure due to falling enrolment.

=== Financial and professional services providers ===
Financial and professional services providers active in the cluster include:

- Barclays – agreed to create a new facility to provide specialist banking services to technology companies based in the area, known as 'Rise'.
- KPMG – opened a dedicated office in January 2013 providing accounting and tax advice to early-stage technology companies.
- McKinsey & Company – has agreed to provide advice on the creation of the hub and help to new companies starting out in the area.
- Silicon Valley Bank – has agreed to establish a UK-based bank to provide financing for technology and life science companies based in the area.
- Capco – relocated their UK headquarters to Great Eastern Street in 2014 (along with BOLD ROCKET), and is currently providing office space for small FinTech startups.
- Taylor Wessing – opened the cluster's first dedicated law firm office in October 2011.

=== Community organisations ===
A number of not-for-profit organisations have created a sense of community in the area including Independent Shoreditch, a business alliance, and Digital Shoreditch, which organises monthly meet-ups plus an annual festival of the same name, as well as a meetup community named Silicon Roundabout that has been organising events since 2011.

East London Radio launched in 2013 as an online talk community radio station run entirely by volunteers, with studios in several East London boroughs.

=== Public sector organisations ===
Public sector organisations active in the cluster included:

- City of London Corporation – assisted in the creation of the Innovation Warehouse
- Tech City Investment Organisation (TCIO) – a quango founded by then UK Government department UK Trade & Investment to encourage the growth and development of the Tech City cluster, since rolled out nationally as Tech Nation (NDPB).

== Housing ==
Many new developments have been built or are due to be built as the cluster expands. Cuckooz, an ASAP member, launched its latest design-led apartments in 2018. These apartments are targeted toward tech companies and are situated in a renovated art deco-style cinema dating back to 1870. A new arthouse cinema is also featured on the ground floor. The Atlas Building on Old Street already has full planning permission and is substantially pre-sold on the market. The Maker, located on Nile Street near City Road and designed by Avanti Architects, is currently under development. It will provide 175 apartments within a 28-story tower and a connected low-rise building.

== Responses ==
The rapid growth of the cluster has met with some criticism. The Centre for London think tank said in 2012 that it felt the development had little focus and could be counter-productive. The think tank also raised concerns over a skills shortage, connectivity, lack of mentoring and rising costs. Also that year Tech City was called a "marketing gimmick" on the wrong side of London, away from Heathrow Airport, which is still over 30% more expensive than any city outside London. James Dyson criticised the coalition government in 2012 for spending money on the scheme to attract international companies who Dyson argued would drive up rents instead of helping start-up and hardware companies, who he felt had greater potential than software and internet companies.

== Transport ==
London Underground Northern line (City branch) and National Rail Northern City Line which is operated by Great Northern provide services at Old Street. With the increase in passenger numbers using the station, in 2014 Transport for London announced that it was to offer pop-up retail space at Old Street station as part of a drive to increase its revenue.

== See also ==
- Financial technology
- Silicon Fen
- Silicon Glen
- MediaCityUK
- The Sharp Project
