= Metrica =

British reputation management company

- Company type: Privately owned
- Industry: PR Measurement Media Analysis; Media Evaluation; Content Analysis; PR Planning; Reputation management Market Research
- Founded: 1993
- Headquarters: 140 Old Street, EC1V 9BJ London, UK; United States; Australia
- Area served: Worldwide
- Key people: Richard Bagnall, (Managing Director); Paul Hender, (Media Analysis Director); Kristin Wadge, (Business Strategy Director); Michael Ishmael, (IT Director); Jason Weekes, (Director of Business Development)
- Number of employees: 200+
- Parent: The Gorkana Group
- Website: www.metrica.net

Metrica is a global media analysis, media evaluation and PR planning consultancy and is now part of the Gorkana group. Headquartered in London, the business was founded in 1993, by Mark Westaby. The company works in the fields of reputation management, public relations measurement and content analysis. Metrica is part of The Gorkana Group, which incorporates Durrants, Gorkana and Metrica.

== History ==
The business was founded in 1993 by Mark Westaby, director of Portfolio Communications. Since 1996 the company has been run by Media Analysis Director Paul Hender and Managing Director Richard Bagnall.

Metrica's Head Office is on Old Street close to the Silicon Roundabout in East London's Tech City. The company employs over 200 staff and consultants across the globe and is retained by more than 150 organisations.

In October 2009, Metrica was acquired by Durrants, a provider of media monitoring services. In April 2010, Durrants also acquired Gorkana, a media database and portal for PRs and journalists. The three companies together form The Gorkana Group.

On 22 November 2010, Durrants announced it has taken a stake in Brighton-based social media monitoring company Brandwatch.

== Services ==
The company specialises in analysing and measuring all forms of media, including broadcast, print, online, social media & CGM (Consumer Generated Media).

Metrica offers the following services: media evaluation, social media monitoring, Social media measurement and evaluation, PR planning, market research and consultancy.

== Membership ==
Metrica is a founding member of The International Association for Measurement and Evaluation of Communication (AMEC), the global trade body and professional institute for agencies and practitioners who provide media evaluation and communication research.
