= Mark Boyle (Moneyless Man) =

Irish writer

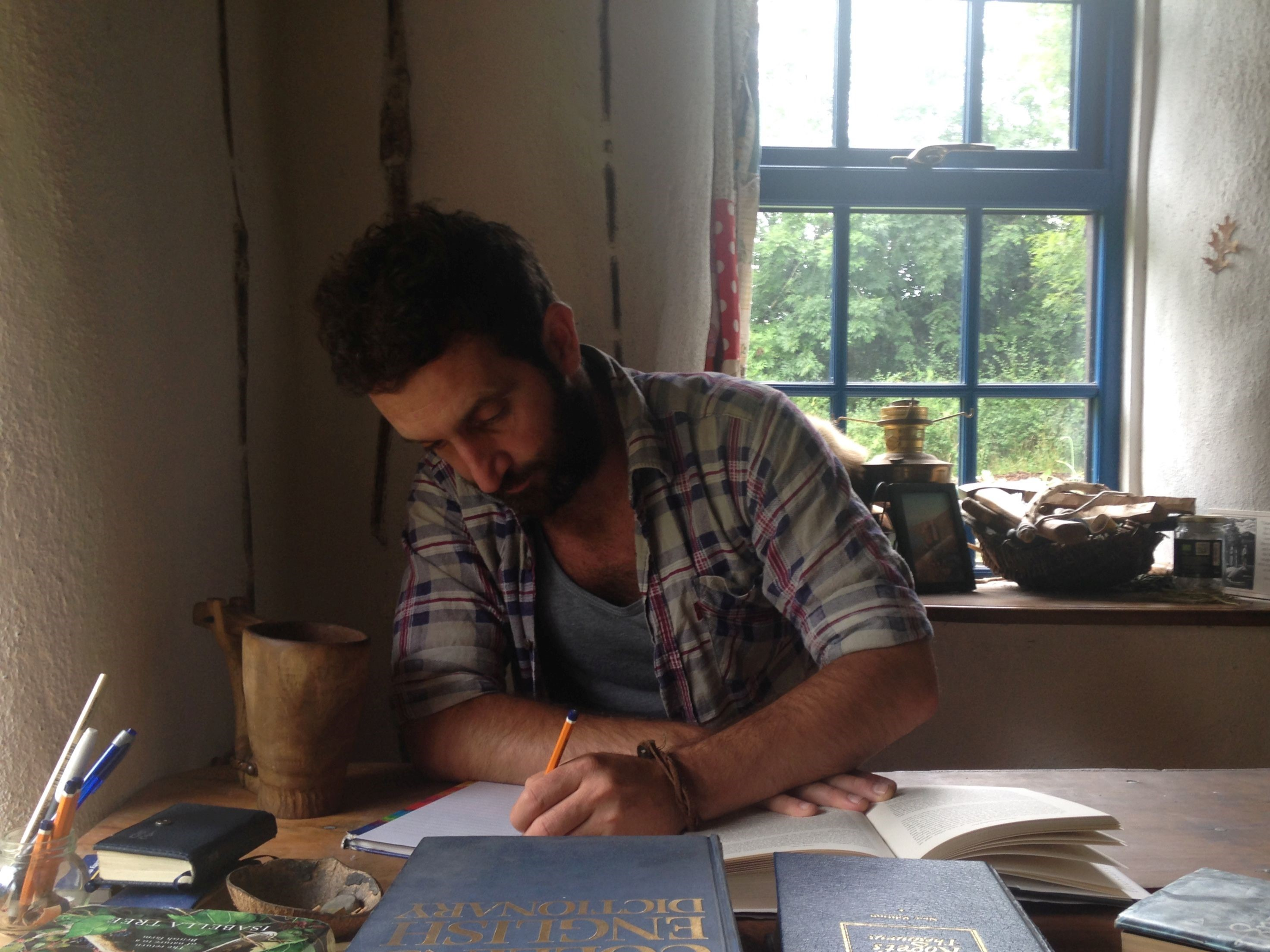
- Boyle, writing in his cabin, in 2018
- Born: 8 May 1979 (age 47); Ballyshannon, County Donegal, Ireland
- Education: Galway-Mayo Institute of Technology (BA)
- Occupation: Writer

Mark Boyle (born 8 May 1979), also known as The Moneyless Man, is an Irish writer best known for living without money from November 2008, and for living without modern technology since 2016. Boyle writes regularly for the British newspaper The Guardian, and has written about his experiences in several books. His first book, The Moneyless Man: A Year of Freeconomic Living, was published in 2010. His fourth book, The Way Home: Tales from a life without technology, was published in 2019. Boyle lives near Loughrea, in County Galway.

== Early life ==
Mark Boyle took a degree in Business at the Galway-Mayo Institute of Technology, before moving to Britain in 2002.

During the final year of his degree, Boyle watched the 1982 film Gandhi, about the life of Mohandas K. Gandhi. He has frequently cited this as the moment that changed his life.

== Early career ==
During his first six years in Britain, Boyle lived in Bristol and managed two organic food companies. In 2007, after a conversation with a friend during which they decided "money... creates a kind of disconnection between us and our actions", Boyle set up the Freeconomy Community.

== Moneyless lifestyle ==
A few months after creating the Freeconomy Community, Boyle set out on a two-and-a-half-year trek from Bristol to Porbandar in India, the birthplace of Gandhi. Inspired by the nonviolent Salt March led in India by Gandhi in 1930, and by the woman in America known as Peace Pilgrim, he set off in January 2008, carrying no money and only a small number of possessions. However, he was forced to turn back only a month into the trip, as language barriers and difficulties in persuading people he would work for food and a place to stay halted his journey shortly after he arrived in Calais. One of his travelling companions had travellers cheques for emergencies, which allowed them to travel back to the UK. He had not planned the trip, believing it was best to let fate take its course.

Later in the same year, Boyle developed an alternative plan: to live without money entirely. After some preparatory purchases (including a solar panel and wood-burning stove), he began his first year of "moneyless living" on Buy Nothing Day 2008.

Boyle has received considerable positive and negative publicity for his moneyless lifestyle, appearing on television, radio and other media in the United Kingdom, Republic of Ireland, Australia, South Africa, United States and Russia. Much of the attention has focused on his day-to-day routine, including food, hygiene, and traditionally expensive aspects of life, such as Christmas. The activist Robin Greenfield has cited Boyle's book The Moneyless Man as an inspiration for his activism.

Mark Boyle is one of a small number of individuals who have lived without money in recent times. These include Heidemarie Schwermer, Tomi Astikainen and Daniel Suelo. One woman, Jo Nemeth also lives without money and has specifically cited reading Boyle's book The Moneyless Man as the inspiration for her own choice. Nemeth was reported in 2025 as living a moneyless lifestyle since 2015, a total of ten years. However, Boyle frequently reminds his readers that a moneyless life is not a new idea; indeed it is the system of money itself that is the new development, having existed for only a small fraction of humanity's c. 200,000-year existence. Other observers note that for nearly all of recorded human history (the c. 5,000 years since the invention of writing) there has been a system of money or currency in place.

Boyle gave up his moneyless lifestyle in 2011 and the first item he bought with money in three years was a pair of shoes from a charity shop. He was so used to not using money at that time that he felt that "it felt as strange as giving it [money] up in the first place had".

Also in 2011, Boyle had a vasectomy done on himself by a doctor because he was worried about the fate of the world and did not want to bring children into a world which he claimed was an overpopulated "artificial intelligence world". This vasectomy was voluntary and he had it done "against all sorts of advice". In 2017, Boyle noted that the trip to the doctor for the voluntary vasectomy was his only trip to a medical facility in the previous 20 years.

In 2013, he moved back to Ireland. In 2015, Mark Boyle opened a moneyless pub on a three-acre permaculture smallholding in County Galway, Ireland. The moneyless pub is called the "Happy Pig" as the building it's in was formerly a pigsty before Boyle bought the farm that he converted into a smallholding. The renovations needed for the Happy Pig were all done using inexpensive natural materials such as cob, cordwood as well as wattle and daub. The Happy Pig serves all food and drink there for free.

Also in 2015, Mark Boyle gave up reading newspapers, watching television and listening to radio. Boyle notes that the exclusion of newspapers includes even The Guardian for which he was a columnist, though this didn't stop him from getting columns of his published in the paper.

Around this time, Mark Boyle reached a turning point in his thinking. Boyle decided that more radical means were needed for the environmental movement and that merely peaceful protest wasn't working to stop eco-catastrophe.

In 2016, Mark Boyle spent the summer hand-building a straw bale house at the permaculture smallholding in County Galway and had moved in there by December that year. On 19 December 2016, Boyle made an announcement in his Guardian column that starting on Wednesday 21 December 2016, he will stop using all "complex technology" which he names as computers, the internet, phones, washing machines, water from taps, gas, fridges, televisions and anything requiring electricity to run. Boyle says there are two reasons why he chose to do this, the first is because he feels happier without technology, the second is that he feels that technology is the direct cause of modern-day environmental and social problems and he rejects technology to set an example. He also announced that he will still continue to write for The Guardian by writing down his articles by hand and posting them to The Guardian. An article on The Guardian website by Sarah Marsh posted on the same day as Boyle's article announced that users can still communicate with Boyle by posting a letter to The Guardian head office address labeled "Opinion Editors" or by posting in the comments section of the article where once a month, the staff will select some comments from the page, print them off and post them to Boyle. Mark Boyle's last day of technology was on Tuesday, 20 December 2016. He stopped using it shortly before midnight when he checked his last ever e-mails and turned off his phone for the last time.

As promised, Boyle kept writing for The Guardian and his first article after the start of Boyle's renunciation of technology was published on 6 February 2017. In it, he wrote about what he noticed in the month since then along with further explaining his reasons for renouncing technology as well as briefly answering a question from a Guardian commenter during one of the explanations. Boyle also notes his admiration for the author Henry David Thoreau who had similar views.

Boyle's next article in The Guardian was published on 25 March 2017 and in it, Boyle noted that he went three months so far without using technology. Boyle wrote that he was recently interviewed for a television show about digital privacy and the future of technology (he does not mention the name of the show). One of the first questions the presenter of the show (a woman, but her name is not given in the article) asked Boyle was "Do you not get really bored?" In response, Boyle laughed. Boyle noted that he does get this question asked a lot by various people curious about his choice to not use technology. The answer Boyle gives to this question is no, he does not get bored. Boyle says that he has lots of things to do and so he doesn't get bored. By this time, Boyle has a girlfriend as he mentions that she "would like nothing better than to take to the road with the horses for an adventure, stopping of at a lake for a wash and a swim". Boyle ends his article by urging people to stop using tech and saying that they can minimise their use of it as for most people, completely removing tech from their lives is probably not desirable or practical. Boyle warns that he believes that one consequence of not taking a critical view of tech is his belief that they will be "sex robots" available by 2027 (ten years after the article publication) and many humans will use those instead of having relations with other humans, leading to a loss of intimacy and emotional connection.

In another article by Boyle in The Guardian published on 22 May 2017, Boyle wrote about his grievances for what he thinks is the way some environmentalists seem to not actually care about the environment or defend "wild places". Boyle claims that those environmentalists instead of protecting nature, actually debate "how to best domesticate these wild places" which he says includes "deserts, oceans, mountains" with the aim of using those places to power the green energy "needed to fuel things that, up until recently, we couldn’t even imagine, let alone claim to need". Boyle also writes about some of the comments The Guardian sent him, a frequent observation in those comments is that Boyle's techless lifestyle as promoted by him is unable to sustain the population of 8 billion humans living on the Earth at the time of posting. Boyle agrees with them and also says that he's "not trying to offer some prescriptive solution for all the world’s peoples and their problems" and claims that implementing such solutions "are what got us into this ecological and social mess to begin with".

== Freeconomy Community ==
The Freeconomy Community was created to allow people to share, moving away from exchange economies towards a pay it forward philosophy. The original www.justfortheloveofit.org site shared similarities with websites such as The Freecycle Network, Freegle and Streetbank, and in 2014 Streetbank and Freeconomy decided that "the two projects would be so much stronger if they came together" and merged.

=== Freeskilling ===
Alongside the online component of the Freeconomy Community, several areas including Bristol and London hold Freeskilling sessions, where freeconomists take turns to pass on their skills in free one-off evening classes. Past topics have included subjects ranging from charity fundraising and anger management to bicycle maintenance, bread-making and campaigning skills.

== Works ==
- The Moneyless Man – Boyle's first book, The Moneyless Man: A Year of Freeconomic Living, was published in June 2010 by Oneworld Publications. The book documents his first moneyless year, including many of the practical and philosophical challenges he faced. The author's proceeds go to the Freeconomy trust, towards purchasing land for the foundation of the Freeconomy Community.
- The Moneyless Manifesto: Live well, live rich, live free – a follow-up guide to beginning your own moneyless journey.
- Drinking Molotov Cocktails with Gandhi – published October 2015. In this book, Boyle argues that our political and economic systems have brought us to the brink of climate catastrophe and peaceful protest is no longer enough to bring about change.
- The Way Home: Tales from a life without technology – published June 2019.
- Ben Fogle: New Lives in the Wild Series 13, 2021

== See also ==
- Anarcho-primitivism
- Gift economy
