= Silicon Milkroundabout =

Silicon Milkroundabout is a series of job fairs held in London, England and Edinburgh, Scotland for the UK tech start-up community. The event's name is a portmanteau of Silicon Roundabout and the Milk round university recruiting events.

== History ==
The company was founded by Cristiana Camisotti, Ian Hogarth, and Pete Smith - the latter two are also the founders of Songkick - in 2011. Its inaugural event took place in a pub with 40 start-up companies. The initiative was supported by David Cameron's initiative Tech City.

The event was expanded into Scotland in 2015 as Silicon Milkroundabout Scotland 1.0. This event was held in Edinburgh with 40 companies and 450 attendees.

The intention of the business was to attract computer science talent to the startup community, in response to a high number of vacancies in the tech start-up sector.

== Events ==
Events are held biannually in London and Edinburgh, and attendees are required to go through an application process to attend. Events are free for job seekers with a ticket to attend.

The event taking place in April 2020 was postponed due to the COVID-19 pandemic.

== Criticism ==
Due to the small space in which it took place in 2022, the number of people inside the London event had to be limited, and this led to some goers complaining about not having enough time there.
