= AI nationalism =

Idea of national control over AI technology

AI nationalism is the idea that nations should develop and control their own artificial intelligence technologies to advance their own interests and ensure technological sovereignty. Countries have implemented new laws, form strategic alliances, and invest significantly in domestic AI capabilities. It is closely related to techno-nationalism and to ideas of AI sovereignty.

== Origins of the term ==
The term was popularized by the 2018 essay AI Nationalism by British technology investor Ian Hogarth. He argued that as AI gains more power and its economic and military significance expands, governments will take measures to bolster their own domestic AI industries, and predicted that the advancement of machine learning systems would accelerate a global arms race, resulting in more closed economies, restrictions on foreign acquisitions, and limitations on the movement of talent. Hogarth also questioned whether Britain would have benefited more had DeepMind remained an independent British company. He described Google's acquisition of London-based DeepMind for £400 million in 2014 as a brilliant acquisition that gave the lab substantial resources, while arguing that the UK and the world would have been better off with the company remaining independent. Writing for the AI Now Institute, Kerry Mackereth described AI nationalism as chiefly reflected in the escalating rhetoric of an artificial intelligence arms race, portraying AI development as a zero-sum game in which the winner gains significant economic, political, and military advantages. This mindset, as highlighted in a 2017 Pentagon report, warns that sharing AI technology could erode technological supremacy and enhance rivals' capabilities. It poses risks including unsafe AI development, increased geopolitical tension, and potential military aggression such as cyberattacks.

== National policies and geopolitical competition ==
Several countries, including Canada, France, and India, have formulated national strategies to advance their positions in AI. In the United States, trade policies have been enacted to restrict China's access to critical microchips, reflecting a strategic effort to maintain a technological edge. The United States’ National Security Commission on Artificial Intelligence (NSCAI) frames AI development as a critical aspect of a broader technology competition crucial for national success, emphasizing the need to outpace China to maintain strategic advantage.

Truby and co-authors, examining the major actors' strategies in the AI race, describe the United States approach in terms of security-oriented techno-nationalism, China's approach through infrastructure- and standards-driven outreach, and the European Union's approach through regulatory diplomacy and initiatives in emerging regions such as the Middle East and Africa.

France has seen notable governmental support for local AI startups, particularly those specializing in language technologies that cater to French and other non-English languages. In Saudi Arabia, Crown Prince Mohammed bin Salman is investing billions in AI research and development. The country has actively collaborated with major technology firms such as Amazon, IBM, and Microsoft to establish itself as a prominent AI hub.

== Related concepts ==
=== Techno-nationalism ===
Hogarth described the agenda he predicted as techno-nationalist. Techno-nationalism links the development and control of strategic technologies with national security and geopolitical influence, treats technological development as a source of national power, and involves government attempts to restrict the transfer of strategic technologies to firms in rival countries.

Chen and Xiao identify a paradox in this logic: because decentralised innovation ecosystems rely on cross-border interaction and coordination, restrictions on technology transfers can leave home-country firms weaker than targeted foreign firms in shaping international standards. Their analysis of U.S. sanctions on Huawei in 3GPP standard-setting finds such restrictions reduced the relative influence of U.S. companies, suggesting that security-oriented controls can backfire when innovation depends on international collaboration.

=== AI sovereignty ===
AI sovereignty concerns the ability of states or political communities to exercise control over the technologies, infrastructure and resources required for the development and deployment of artificial intelligence, including computing capacity, data, technological expertise and the ability to regulate AI systems.

Daniel Mügge argues that the concept obscures the tensions in actual EU strategy: AI sovereignty may pit the EU against other major AI powers or citizens against large tech companies, serve either the logic of an AI race or its rejection, and benefit European citizens or embrace a global responsibility. He finds that EU policy has favoured jurisdictional independence and participation in global competition over alternatives centred on citizen sovereignty and global responsibility.

Gleb Papyshev and Keith Jin Deng Chan analyse the EU's regulatory strategy with a game-theoretic model: stringent regulation is rational only where it burdens foreign firms disproportionately and foreign technological advantages remain moderate. Applied to the EU AI Act's rules on general-purpose AI, their framework makes the EU's leverage depend on how regulation redistributes domestic market power and on the state of transatlantic cooperation.

=== Digital nationalism ===
Digital nationalism concerns the ways in which digital technologies contribute to the reproduction and transformation of national identities. Sabina Mihelj and César Jiménez-Martínez identify three mechanisms through which digital technologies reproduce national belonging: the architecture of internet domain names, algorithmic biases, and the formation of national digital ecosystems.

== Historical and cultural context ==
According to Kerry Mackereth (now Kerry McInerney), writing as a postdoctoral researcher at the Cambridge Centre for Gender Studies, some forms of AI nationalist discourse reproduce historical narratives of racism and imperialism. Her analysis focuses on the rhetoric of the artificial intelligence competition between the United States and China, which she connects with histories of colonialism, racial capitalism and long-standing anti-Asian stereotypes, such as the "Yellow Peril". She presents this racialised form as one manifestation of AI nationalism rather than a characteristic of all national AI policies, noting that AI also bolsters other nationalist projects, including the policing and production of national borders.

== Implications ==
=== International technological cooperation ===
Truby and co-authors distinguish "AI diplomacy" from "AI statehood" and "AI sovereignty". They argue that AI diplomacy, through governance and capacity-building, can serve international stability and improved relations rather than divide nations.

=== Digital fragmentation ===
AI nationalism is often associated with this broader trend towards the fragmentation of the internet, where digital services are increasingly influenced by local regulations and national interests, creating a landscape in which the impact of artificial intelligence on individuals' lives can vary significantly depending on their geographic location.

J. Paul Goode argues that the transformation of citizens into population data is driving changes to state sovereignty and may crystallize into nationalist responses, proposing causal mechanisms for the emergence and spread of AI nationalism.

== See also ==
- Artificial Intelligence Cold War
- Space Race
- Technological escalation
- Technological sovereignty
