= AMEE =

AMEE may refer to:

- 1963 American Mount Everest expedition, the first time Americans reached the summit
- Autonomous Mapping Evaluation and Evasion, a robot in the 2000 film Red Planet
- Avoiding Mass Extinctions Engine in climate change
- Amee (singer), a Vietnamese singer belonging to St.319 Entertainment
