= Technological sovereignty =

Political concept

Technological sovereignty is a political outlook where information and communications infrastructure and technology critical for competitiveness and welfare is aligned to the laws, needs and interests of the jurisdiction in which users are located.

Data sovereignty or information sovereignty sometimes overlaps with technological sovereignty, since their distinctions are not clear, and also refer to subjective information about the laws of the country in which the data subject is a citizen, or the information is stored or flows through, whatever its form, including when it has been converted and stored in binary digital form.

Technological sovereignty is considered distinct from autarky and deglobalization, as it only seeks to avoid full dependencies on critical technologies. Governments may use industrial policy to try to improve their technological sovereignty.

== History ==
In the Post–Cold War era, the concept of technological sovereignty has gained popularity due to a number of world events highlighting the vulnerability of technological dependence.

In 1964, Pierre Cognard of France's General Delegation for Scientific and Technical Research wrote "Certainly it would be absurd to systematically oppose oneself to the introduction into a country of a foreign firm which brings in a superior technology and thus contributes to economic progress.… Nevertheless, we do not see how a Nation could maintain its political independence if such penetration becomes generalized."

=== Surveillance concerns ===
Following revelations by Edward Snowden in 2013 about the activities of the United States' National Security Agency and their PRISM surveillance programme, rising concerns about misuse of data led to various proposals to enable citizens and consumers outside of the US to enjoy protection through technological sovereignty.

=== COVID-19 pandemic ===
Supply chain disruptions during the COVID-19 pandemic served as a wake-up call for nations to decrease their dependence on oversea supply chains as factory closures, transportation disruptions and export controls all contributed to unavailability of important imports. Meanwhile, countries that did have adequate supplies limited exports of those supplies.

=== Sanctions and economic concerns ===
US sanctions against China as well as the Made in China 2025 policy have accelerated the desire for technological sovereignty for China and the United States, but also for other economic blocks.

In October 2020, the White House Office of Science and Technology Policy released the National Strategy for Critical and Emerging Technologies, to advance US "technological competitiveness and national security."

Technological sovereignty is also pursued by Russia. Especially after finding itself sanctioned by many countries following the annexation of Crimea in 2014 and the invasion of Ukraine in 2022, Russia started a strategy of import substitution.

=== Open source software ===
The German government established the Sovereign Tech Agency in 2022 to fund open source software projects.

=== Cloud services and AI ===
Following the 2025 United States tariffs against the European Union, fear of overreliance on US cloud providers such as Microsoft 365 and Google Workspace increased. According to Nextcloud, one of the foremost alternatives to replace them, during the first five months of 2025, customer interest in the software had tripled. Some governmental organisations including the European Data Protection Supervisor and the German state of Schleswig-Holstein have since switched from Microsoft's Sharepoint to Nextcloud. In 2020, French president Emmanuel Macron stated "If we don't build our own champions in all areas — digital, artificial intelligence — our choices will be dictated by others." This transition is increasingly characterized as a "Third Gutenberg Moment," where the integration of AI and digital currencies is seen as a prerequisite for maintaining national sovereignty and economic relevance. In 2023, the EU passed the Chips Act to encourage semiconductor production, followed in 2024 by the Artificial Intelligence Act regulating AI technology. In 2024, a coalition of academics and policy-makers called for limiting EU's dependence on foreign technology by investing in European cloud digital infrastructure, under an initiative labelled EuroStack. The trend of digital sovereignty in Europe was sparked by Microsoft when the company disabled the Outlook email account of the Chief Prosecutor of the International Criminal Court (ICC), a court based in The Hague, Netherlands, in 2025.

== Limitations ==
In outsourcing and lack of suitable human capital may hinder efforts to achieve technological sovereignty. In the past, striving for technological sovereignty has led to convergence to a small number of technologies, which can lead to technologies outside of the scope of technological sovereignty to be neglected. Policies aimed at technological sovereignty may also attract lobbying for broad state subsidies and protectionist policies.

== National doctrine ==
=== Australia ===
Australian defence doctrine emphasizes maintaining technical "sovereign capabilities" capable of operating independent of any foreign power. For example, Australia accepted additional costs when building the Jindalee Operational Radar Network to avoid operational dependence on foreign powers.

== See also ==
- AI nationalism
- Data governance
- Data localization
- Decoupling and re-coupling
- Digital self-determination
- Information privacy (data protection)
- Legal aspects of computing
- Network sovereignty
- Privacy
- Technological supremacy
