= Lever (company) =

Software company headquartered in San Francisco, California and Toronto, Canada

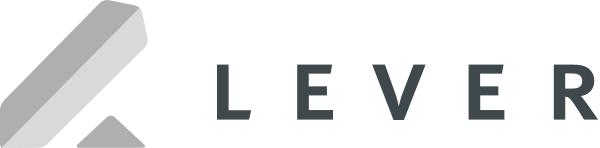
- Founded: 2012
- Founders: Nate Smith, Sarah Nahm, Randal Truong, and Brian Noguchi
- Headquarters: San Francisco, CA and Toronto, ON, Canada
- Website: www.lever.co

Lever is a software company headquartered in San Francisco, California, and Toronto, Canada that provides an applicant tracking system for hiring. It was founded in 2012 by Nate Smith, Sarah Nahm, Randal Truong, and Brian Noguchi. It is backed by an advisory board which includes Aaron Levie, Marissa Mayer, and Jeremy Stoppelman.

== Funding and History ==
Smith began Lever in 2012 and was accepted into Y Combinator with the goal of applying this framework to the problem of hiring talent. Smith connected with Nahm and Truong through Stanford University and Google networks. All three had previously worked at technology companies.

In September 2012, Lever raised $2.8 million in a seed round led by SV Angel. Other investors included Marissa Mayer (CEO of Yahoo!), Aaron Levie (CEO and co-founder of Box), Jeremy Stoppelman (CEO and co-founder of Yelp), and Y Combinator.

In October 2014, Lever raised $10 million in its series A round led by Matrix Partners. Other investors included SV Angel, Redpoint Ventures, Index Ventures, Y Combinator, and Khosla general partners Keith Rabois and Ben Ling.

In Jan 2016, Lever announced it raised a $20 million Series B led by Scale Venture Partners.

In 2021, Lever raised $50 million in a Series D round led by Apax Digital Fund.

In August 2022, Lever was acquired by Employ Inc. for an undisclosed sum.

== Software ==
Lever is an applicant tracking system. The Lever Hire and Lever Nurture features allow customers to grow their network of potential hires. Lever Analytics allows customers to access customized reports with data visualization, completed offers, and interview feedback.

Lever offers a number of integrations. It first launched integrations with Slack and Namely in 2015. It followed up in 2016 with integrations for Connectifier, Entelo, Hired, Zenefits, and others. Today, Lever offers over 300 integrations.

== Customers ==
As of 2021, Lever customers included Netflix, Atlassian, KPMG, and McGraw-Hill Education.
