= Ian Hogarth =

British investor

Ian Hogarth CBE is an investor and entrepreneur. He co-founded Songkick in 2007 and Plural Platform in 2021. Hogarth is the current Chair of the UK Government's AI Foundation Model Taskforce, which conducts artificial intelligence safety research.

== Education ==
Hogarth attended Dulwich College, before studying information engineering at the University of Cambridge. He later specialised in machine learning during his Masters. Hogarth also spent time at Tsinghua University in Beijing, learning Mandarin Chinese.

== Entrepreneurship and investing ==
=== Songkick ===
Hogarth founded the live music startup Songkick with friends Michelle You and Pete Smith in 2007. This was part of the 2007 Y Combinator program in Boston. Hogarth and his fellow Songkick co-founders were named to Inc. magazine's 30-under-30 list in 2010. The same year, Hogarth won the British Council’s UK Young Music Entrepreneur of the Year award. He was also named one of Forbes magazine's 2012 music 30-under-30.

In 2013, Songkick launched Detour, a crowdfunding platform for concerts.

In June 2015, Songkick announced its merger with direct ticket vendor CrowdSurge and a $16.6m Series C investment round. Hogarth became co-CEO of the combined company, alongside Matt Jones, the former CrowdSurge CEO.

=== Silicon Milkroundabout ===
In 2010, Hogarth and Songkick COO Pete Smith founded Silicon Milkroundabout, a career fair for high tech startups in East London. It was established in response to lack of interest from graduates hampering tech start-ups, according to Hogarth.

=== Plural Platform ===
Hogarth co-founded Plural Platform in 2021, an early-stage venture capital firm. Hogarth has invested in more than 150 companies, including over 50 AI companies.

== Artificial intelligence ==
Hogarth has co-written the State of AI report since 2018 with Nathan Benaich. He wrote a blog post entitled "AI Nationalism" about the rise of machine learning influencing a new kind of geopolitics. He also wrote an article in the Financial Times arguing that the "race to God-like AI" poses risks, and might lead to human extinction. Hogarth was listed as one of the 100 most influential personalities in the artificial intelligence sphere by the magazine Time in 2023.

=== AI Safety Institute ===
On 18 June 2023, Hogarth was announced as Chair of the UK Government's AI Safety Institute, an AI safety research organization.
