= Eric van der Kleij =

British entrepreneur

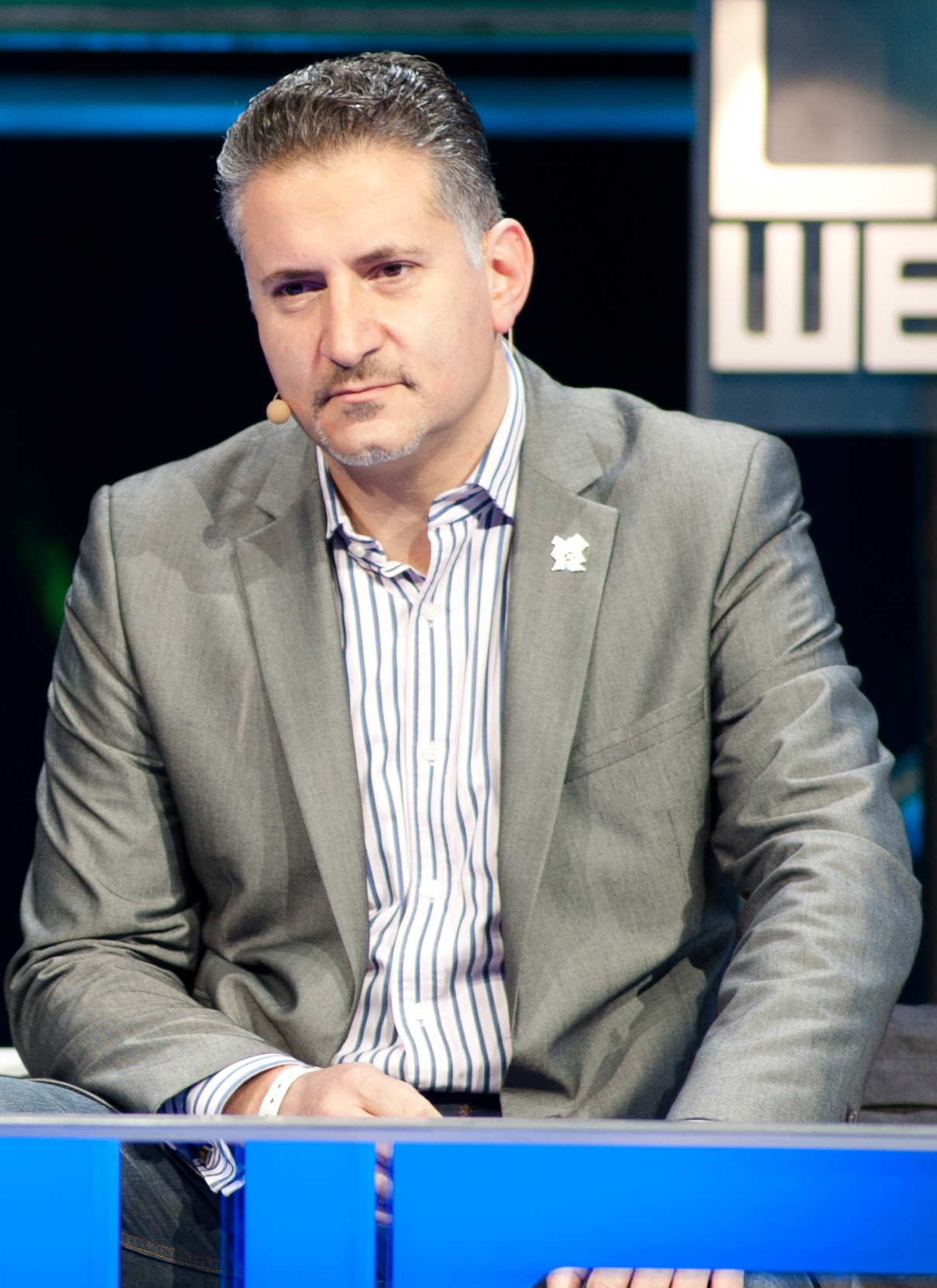
Eric van der Kleij at the LeWeb11 Conference, December 2011

Eric van der Kleij is a British entrepreneur who led the Level39 Fintech Accelerator programme for Canary Wharf Group plc from March 2013 to January 2016.

== Early life and career ==
Van der Kleij was born and raised in South Africa, and moved to the United Kingdom at the age of 15. His interest in technology was sparked when his brother bought him a Sinclair ZX81 as a teenager. Deciding that he lacked the technical skill to be a programmer, van der Kleij went on to study business, after which he began a career in technology by commissioning software for golf clubs to keep track of their membership. Van der Kleij became a "serial entrepreneur", creating several telecommunications companies. His first major success began with an Internet call-back business, named RealCall, which allowed advertisers to place a link in their advertisement which clients would click to receive a phone call from the advertiser. The service failed to take off, but from it, van der Kleij developed a business which alerted consumers to possible credit card fraud, which became known as Adeptra. Adeptra expanded into the United States in 2000, which required van der Kleij to raise £30 million in funding. After leaving the company in 2006, van der Kleij was approached by the British Government to assist in the set-up of its Global Entrepreneur Programme—an initiative to help UK-based technology companies expand and globalise their business.

== Tech City ==
In 2011 British Prime Minister David Cameron announced a plan to make the United Kingdom a global leader in number of technology startups, with the creation of Tech City, designed to compete with Silicon Valley. Eric van der Kleij was appointed to take charge of the enterprise.
