= Technological supremacy =

Technological supremacy is the notion of supremacy in the field of technology in either a regional or global international relations context, as well as in subfields, such as military-technological supremacy, including cyber and air supremacy. The notion of one or more powers enjoying technological supremacy is ancient; the term itself dates back to the 1950s. It is normally understood to be wielded by a superpower, such as the United States, originally in competition with the Soviet Union and later with China. Fields in which technological supremacy is being contested include artificial intelligence; wireless technology; and batteries, especially lithium batteries.

Specifically, China is developing its Little Giants program to rival Silicon Valley, its Made in China 2025 program, a new infrastructure program, its Xinchuang Plan for alternative innovation, its digital currency plan, and its science parks plan. The development and maintenance of technological supremacy is associated with the promotion of technological companies and, in the military field, the relation between technological companies and the military in a country's military-technological complex, including Chinese-style 'military-civil fusion'.

The quest for technological supremacy appears often in science fiction, such as in Ready Player One.

== See also ==
- AI nationalism
- Existential risk from artificial intelligence
- Gunboat diplomacy
- Military-industrial complex
- Network sovereignty
- Offset strategy
- Technological sovereignty
- Technological utopianism
