= RedMonk =

- Founded: 2002; 23 years ago
- Founders: James Governor; Stephen O'Grady
- Headquarters: Portland, Maine, United States
- Website: www.redmonk.com

RedMonk is an industry analyst firm focused on software developers and headquartered in Portland, Maine, United States. It was founded on the premise of the increasing influence of software developers in the technology industry. RedMonk co-founder Stephen O'Grady authored a book on "The New Kingmakers: How Developers Conquered the World" which details this premise and a book on "The Software Paradox: The Rise and Fall of the Commercial Software Market" which considers the changing role of commercial software.

RedMonk covers trends in the software industry such as the top-used programming languages.

== Awards ==
RedMonk co-founder James Governor was awarded the Women in Marketing Equality Advocate award in 2016.

RedMonk was highly ranked in a number of categories from the Institute of Industry Analyst Relations in 2008, specifically:

- Analyst of the year #3: James Governor, RedMonk
- Analyst firm of the year #4: RedMonk
- Most relevant #5: RedMonk
- Most import firm #6: RedMonk
