= Entelo =

American company

Entelo, Inc.
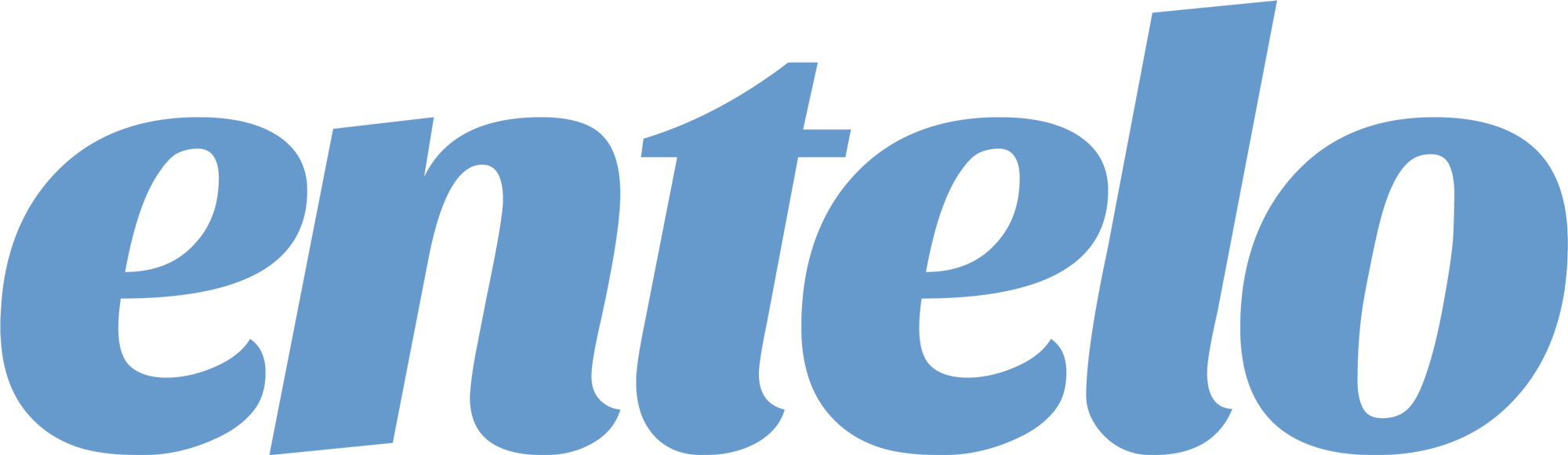
- Type: Private Company
- Industry: Software as a Service
- Founder: Jon Bischke, John McGrath
- Headquarters: San Francisco (HQ), New York City, USA
- Key people: Jon Bischke (CEO, Co-Founder)
- Products: Envoy, Search, Diversity
- Website: www.entelo.com

Entelo, Inc. is a privately held technology company located in San Francisco, California. Entelo offers a SaaS platform used by recruiters and hiring managers to find potential employees.

== History ==
Entelo was founded in May 2011 and launched in October 2012 with an undisclosed amount of seed funding. Initially, Entelo offered two products: Search, which allowed recruiters to browse over 300 million social profiles using standard Boolean search, and Sonar, a predictive algorithm used to determine which candidates were most likely to leave their current job. In June 2013, Entelo announced $3.5 million in Series A funding, led by Battery Ventures and Menlo Ventures.

Entelo launched its Diversity product in April 2014, allowing recruiters to source candidates from underrepresented groups based on gender, ethnicity, and veteran status. Its email tracking and outreach tool, Track, was released in January 2015. The company launched a candidate-ranking analytics solution called Stack in October 2015 and followed up with a mobile companion to Stack in October 2016. In June 2017, Entelo raised $20 million Series C round of funding led by U.S. Venture Partners with Battery Ventures, Shasta Venture and Correlation Ventures.

== Products ==
Diversity: When paired with Search, allows recruiters to locate candidates of under-represented groups.

They have used algorithms to find pick up on programmers who may be looking for a new place to work.
