= Gojimo =

British education software company

- Type: Privately held company
- Industry: Education Applications
- Founded: January 2014
- Founder: George Burgess
- Headquarters: Shoreditch, London, United Kingdom
- Area served: Worldwide
- Key people: George Burgess (CEO)
- Services: Revision application, revision content

Gojimo is an education software company headquartered in London, United Kingdom, which produces a self-test exam preparation mobile app for the iPhone, iPad, Android and the web. The content spans mainly across the secondary school public exams syllabus in the UK and USA such as GCSE, A Level and the SAT. As of January 2015 the app has been installed over 500,000 times.

Gojimo was founded by serial entrepreneur George Burgess. The app currently offers over 50,000 free multiple-choice, curriculum-based quiz questions and over 10,000 premium questions.

== History ==
George Burgess came up with the idea for exam preparation apps while studying for his A Level exams. Media accounts have made light of his being caught emailing a freelance app developer by his Geography teacher, who resultantly became his first business adviser. Having established EducationApps Ltd. the EducationApps range grew to over a hundred subject-specific apps. The apps quickly took off and Burgess produced nine BBC Bitesize apps (in a deal with BBC Active, a joint venture between BBC Worldwide and Pearson Education). He continued to run the company while studying at Stanford University in America. In 2014 venture capital firm Index Ventures and JamJar Investments, a fund set up by the founders of Innocent smoothies, announced they invested over $1 million in Burgess’ company, which was rebranded as Gojimo and grouped into a single platform solution and launched at the 2014 BETT show.

Over the course of 2014 the Gojimo team began to develop in-house content, the teacher portal and launched on Android and the web in 2015. The team now has 14 members of staff. Gojimo was also a finalist of the Best App Category of BETT 2015.

In March 2017, Gojimo was acquired by Telegraph Media Group.

== Functionality ==
The in-app store is used to locate quizzes and study guides: users browse by subject or qualification. Study guides can be searched or navigated by topic.

Within each set of questions. users can take a random quiz or choose a specific topic on which to focus. Quizzes consist of multiple choice questions with four possible answers. After answering each question the user is given in-depth explanations of the answer and links to further reading. They can also track their improvement over time in the progress review section.

== Content ==
The app currently offers content for various subjects for UK exams: 11+ Common Entrance, 13+ Common Entrance, GCSE and A-Level; US Exams: SAT, ACT and AP; and international undergraduate and IGCSE qualifications.

The subjects offered vary between qualifications but include Biology, Chemistry, Physics, Geography, History, Maths, Law, Politics, Religious Studies, English, Latin, Spanish, German, Psychology and Design Technology.

In addition to content which is generated by in-house writers and fact-checked by teachers, external publishers such as McGraw-Hill Education and Oxford University Press have created premium content for the app. There are currently 60,000 questions available across the different qualifications.

== Aims ==
Gojimo aims to be the world's leading exam preparation application and to take a significant role in the transformation of education away from textbooks and towards digital sources. George Burgess has participated in numerous public functions to help to spread this idea, such as when he was selected to take part in the UK's Great Tech Expedition to America, initiated by the then London mayor Boris Johnson
