= Bequest (company) =

Defunct British life insurance company

- Type: Private
- Founded: 2019
- Founder: James Buckley-Thorp
- Defunct: 2022
- Headquarters: London, England, United Kingdom,
- Services: Life insurance, Wills and estate planning
- Website: www.bequest.com

Bequest Life Insurance was a privately owned British fintech life insurance company headquartered in the United Kingdom. It operated under two insurance licenses: life and wills. Bequest was regulated by the Financial Conduct Authority and was one of the earliest of a number of new app-based insurance providers in the UK before its closure in 2022.

== History ==
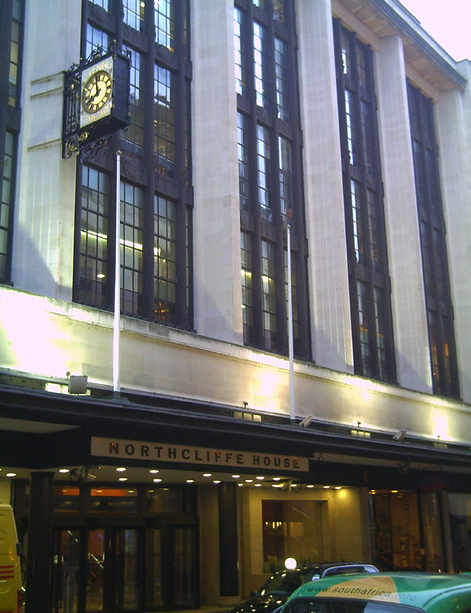
Northcliffe House, former headquarters of Bequest.com

Bequest was founded by James Buckley-Thorp in 2019 and ceased operations in 2022. Its head office was located in London, England, United Kingdom. Bequest was backed by both Aviva and Covea and provided life insurance, wills, and estate planning to consumers. In 2021, the company raised just over £1.7m in investment from Clocktower Ventures, Kuvi Capital, and Form Ventures.
