= Guru.com =

American freelance marketplace platform

- Company type: Private
- Industry: Internet; Freelance marketplace
- Founded: 1998; 28 years ago in Pittsburgh, United States
- Founders: Inder Guglani
- Headquarters: Pittsburgh, United States
- Area served: Worldwide
- Key people: Inder Guglani (CEO)
- Products: Guru.com platform
- Services: Freelance marketplace Escrow payments Project collaboration tools Time tracking
- Website: guru.com

Guru.com is an American online freelance marketplace that connects businesses with independent professionals for project-based and contract work. The platform is operated by Websoft, Inc. and is headquartered in Pittsburgh, Pennsylvania.

== History ==
Guru.com traces its origins to eMoonlighter.com, an online marketplace for freelance talent founded in 1998 by Inder Guglani in Pittsburgh. The eMoonlighter platform directly connected businesses with freelancers across four professional categories, including information technology, creative design, office administration, and business consulting. A separate company, Guru Inc., was founded in 1998 in San Francisco by brothers Jon and James Slavet as an online clearing house for high tech workers seeking short-term contracts. Guru Inc. raised approximately US$3 million in angel funding followed by a US$16 million venture round led by Greylock Partners and August Capital, eventually raising a total of about US$63 million from investors including American Express, Credit Suisse First Boston, and Investor AB.

In December 2002, Guru was acquired by Unicru, a human resources software company based in Portland, Oregon. Unicru retained Guru's technology and staff but decided to discontinue the freelance marketplace operations as they did not align with its core focus on recruiting software.

In June 2003, eMoonlighter acquired the Guru.com domain name, logo, and related assets from Unicru, merging them with its existing freelance platform. In February 2004, eMoonlighter officially changed its name to Guru.com.

== Platform ==
Guru.com operates an online marketplace where employers post job descriptions and freelancers create profiles listing their skills, services, portfolios, and rates. Employers can browse freelancer profiles and invite specific professionals to submit quotes, while freelancers may bid on open job postings. Once hired, both parties form an agreement covering scope of work, payment terms, and project timeline. The platform supports four payment models, including fixed-price, hourly, task-based, and recurring contracts.

== See also ==
- Upwork
- Fiverr
- Freelancer.com
- PeoplePerHour
