= Altitude Learning =

American educational technology company

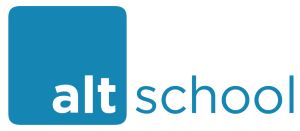
- Formerly: AltSchool
- Type: Private public benefit corporation
- Industry: Education
- Founded: 2013
- Founders: Max Ventilla (CEO); Bharat Mediratta (CTO)
- Headquarters: San Francisco, United States
- Area served: United States
- Key people: Devin Vodicka (Chief Impact Officer)
- Website: www.altschool.com

Altitude Learning (formerly AltSchool) is an American education and technology company founded in 2013. It is headquartered in San Francisco.

== History ==
Max Ventilla founded AltSchool in 2013 as a company that operated schools built around a personalized learning model. The company created a series of small schools based on this model, where students were involved in creating personalized projects for themselves. Students and teachers created individual "playlists" of tasks and projects for each student. Students' progress was streamed to parents using a portal app. In 2014, the company raised $33 million of venture capital funding. In 2015, AltSchool raised $100 million in funding.

By 2016, the company had opened six schools in San Francisco, Palo Alto and Brooklyn. That year, the company partnered with three schools in California and Virginia. In 2017, AltSchool launched a small middle school in New York City's Union Square.

The company later began closing or divesting from its schools. In 2019, AltSchool ceased operating schools directly and rebranded as Altitude Learning, an educational software company.

Altitude Learning stopped operations in 2025.
