= Livemusic =

UK music concert listings website and ticket aggregator

- Company type: Private
- Website type: E-commerce, Music
- Founded: London, UK (2007)
- Headquarters: London, UK
- Area served: UK
- Key people: Mick Newton (CEO); Ben Newton (COO)
- Products: Music ticket retailer, Live music platform
- Website: www.livemusic.fm
- Registration: Required
- Launched: 2007
- Current status: Active

Livemusic is a UK music concert listings website and ticket aggregator. It enables users to compare ticket prices between ticket agents (including Ticketmaster and Seatwave), follow artists to receive email alerts with information on gigs, connect with fellow gig-attendees, and post their own reviews. Livemusic has over 40,000 pages of band and artist profiles, and hosts a catalogue of exclusive interviews and videos for popular artists.

== History ==
Livemusic was founded in 2007 by Mick Newton (CEO) and his son Ben Newton (COO). Prior to the foundation of Livemusic, Mick worked alongside Tom Watkins, co-managing 80s pop band Bros. Mick then went on to manage Grammy Award winner Steve Winwood, until 2008, his final project being to arrange for Winwood to perform with Eric Clapton at three sold-out shows at Madison Square Garden.

The company's head office is based within the Silicon Roundabout area of Shoreditch, East London.

In 2011, Livemusic announced the appointment to its board of Nick Gatfield (Chairman & CEO of Sony Music UK & Ireland), Giles Thorley (former CEO of Punch Taverns plc), and Peter Bond (Chairman, Bond Aviation Group, founder investor in Soho House Group).

== Services ==
Livemusic allows users to compare and purchase tickets for over 25,000 forthcoming gigs across the UK. Livemusic also offers a self-promotion service for unsigned bands called Live&Loud.

== Live&Loud ==
In October 2011, Livemusic launched Live&Loud, an online self-promotion tool and gig-booking service for unsigned bands that functions by matching them to available performance slots at small to medium-sized live music venues across the UK, promoting and selling tickets to the gigs, and rewarding bands with the fastest-growing social media profiles and most active fanbases, by offering them the chance to support a major signed band at a future sold-out Livemusic Student Union event. As of October 2011, 2000 UK bands have signed up to the service.

== Livemusic Student Union Tour ==
Livemusic stages tours at various Student Unions within UK Universities. The first event, which took place at King's College London in September 2011, was headlined by Miles Kane.
