= Media evaluation =

Media evaluation is a discipline of the social and logical social sciences and centres on the analysis of media content, rating the exposure using a number of pre-designated criteria commonly including tonal value and presence of key messages.
