= Tech City College =

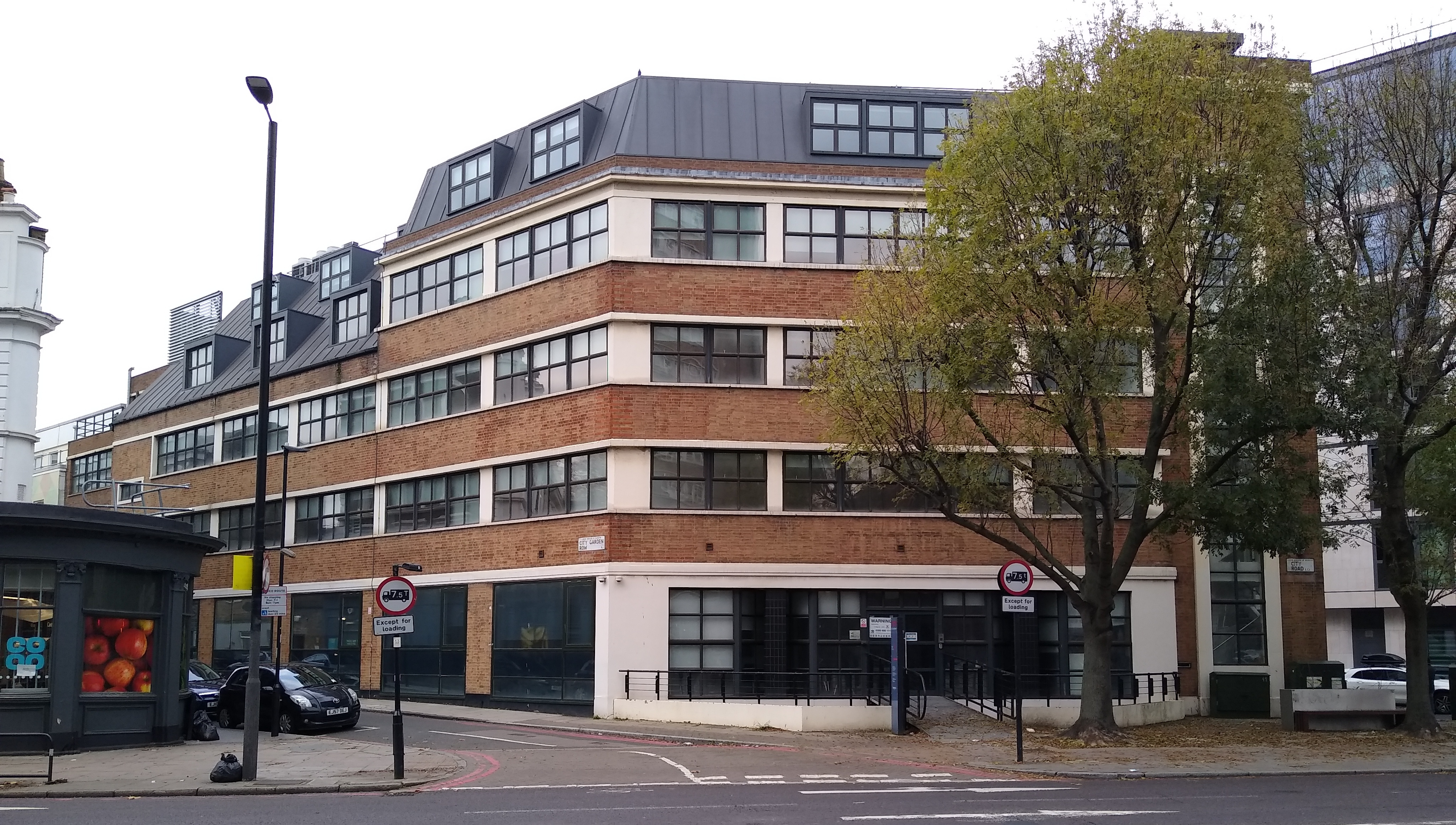

Location
- 263-269 City Road; Islington; London, EC1V 1JX; England; 51.5301°N 0.0978°W

Information
- Type: Free school sixth form
- Established: 2 September 2013
- Local authority: Islington
- Trust: Aspirations Academy Trust
- Department for Education URN: 139793 Tables
- Ofsted: Reports
- Headteacher: Ms Nasrin Farahani
- Gender: Mixed
- Age: 16 to 19
- Website: http://www.techcity-aspirations.org/

Tech City College (Formerly STEM Academy) is a free school sixth form located in the Islington area of the London Borough of Islington, England.

It originally opened in September 2013, as STEM Academy Tech City and specialised in Science, Technology, Engineering and Maths (STEM) and the Creative Application of Maths and Science. In September 2015, STEM Academy joined the Aspirations Academy Trust was renamed Tech City College. Tech City College offers A-levels and BTECs as programmes of study for students.
