= Unicru =

- Company type: Private
- Industry: computer software
- Founded: 1987
- Defunct: 2006
- Fate: Acquired by Kronos Incorporated
- Headquarters: Beaverton, Oregon

Unicru was a United States computer software company which produced a human resources software line built to aid companies in evaluating job applicants and their suitability for particular positions by giving them personality tests. Many of their customers were large retailers such as Big Y, Lowe's, Hollywood Video, Hastings Entertainment, Albertsons, Toys R Us, PetSmart, Best Buy, and Blockbuster Video. According to its vendor, Unicru was used in 16% of major retail hiring in the United States as of early 2009.

== History ==
Unicru was founded in 1987 as Decision Point Data and is headquartered in Beaverton, Oregon. It acquired two other software companies: Guru.com in 2003 and Xperius (formerly Personic) in 2004. The Guru.com URL and logo were subsequently sold to eMoonlighter.com which now operates under the Guru.com brand. In August 2006, Kronos announced it had acquired Unicru.

According to The Wall Street Journal, cheating on the tests, using answer keys available online, became more common during the late-2000s recession, though Kronos denies that cheating is common or significantly affects the test's validity.

== See also ==
- Industrial and organizational psychology
