= Digital Shoreditch =

- Locations: Shoreditch, London, UK
- Years active: 2010–2015
- Founders: Digital Shoreditch Ltd
- Attendance: 2013: 14,537; 2012: 11,983; 2011: 2,191
- Website: digitalshoreditch.com

Digital Shoreditch was an industry-led trade festival celebrating and promoting the creative, technical and entrepreneurial talent of London, that tended to be held in or around the Shoreditch area. The collective, established in 2010, is a collaborative network for companies and individuals from across the digital sectors and features year-round meetups, parties, conferences, trade shows, workshops, hackathons, festivals and other events, organised by Digital Shoreditch Ltd.

== Festival overview ==
Digital Shoreditch Festival was created as a platform for organisations across the creative and tech community. A broad spectrum of industry areas are represented in the festival, such as advertising, branding, broadcasting, production, film, music, gaming, design. The purpose of the festivals is for companies and people with ideas to display their products and to connect to potential investors, and to act as a showcase to anyone interested in digital.

== History ==
In 2011, the festival was established by co-founders Kam Star and James Allsopp. The first Digital Shoreditch Festival ran from 3 to 7 May in 2011 and included a programme of meetups, talks, open studios, workshops and a one-day Summit held in Aldgate Conference Centre which attracted 300 participators.

=== 2012 ===
Held from 21 May to 1 June 2012, Digital Shoreditch Festival became the single biggest digital community event in the UK with over 11,900 individuals, press and companies from the UK, Europe and the rest of the world.

=== 2013 ===
In 2013 the festival had over 14,500 participants and 536 session speakers. Participation was from 2,254 companies and 207 media partners and sponsors, making it one of the biggest tech Festival's in Europe in 2013.

=== 2014 ===
Digital Shoreditch held networking events in collaboration with partners to research and understand the needs of the growing, changing community, with the intention of delivering a strongly collaborative and highly responsive festival in 2015.

=== 2015 ===
The most recent and last festival for Digital Shoreditch took place within Hoxton Square and Shoreditch Town Hall on 11 to 24 May 2015. Numerous partnerships and sponsorships took place within the week from, City University London, Visa, Queen Mary University of London.

== Other events ==
Since 2012, Digital Shoreditch has previewed its festival as part of Hackney House Austin.
