= Streetbank =

UK-based network that helped users share equipment and skills with their neighbours

The Streetbank was a UK-based network and Website that helped users share items with their neighbours. It was launched in July 2010 by Sam Stephens and Ryan Davies in West London.

It closed on 1 March 2024.

Sam Stephens initially set it up to encourage neighbours to share items that they own but do not use every day, such as ladders, drills, and hedge cutters, as well as to "save money, cut down on waste, and reduce their carbon footprints".

Streetbank saw itself as more than just a free item site and encouraged people to get to know their neighbours, not just exchange items and leave. Streetbank also allowed its users to share advice, skills, language teaching, cooking, and DIY.

It had 15,000 members in September 2012. More than £1 million worth of skills and items had been listed on the site by October 2013. The organization had 300 members per square mile in West London, its busiest area. In 2013, The Times listed the site as one of the "50 websites you can’t live without".

Member accounts were free to set up and users were encouraged to offer items for free or to lend, or offer their time/skills. Members could also make requests and provide information ("notices"). Users could choose the size of their "neighbourhood" and can opt to receive messages from other users living within one, five or ten miles. After a user joins Streetbank, they received a weekly newsletter about local announcements and new offers and wants.

== History ==
The Streetbank was founded in 2010, as a not for profit organization. Founder Sam Stephens says he got the idea when he saw a neighbour using a pair of hedge cutters and realised he needed to borrow some.

In 2012 and 2013, Streetbank was awarded funding by Nesta.

In October 2013, Streetbank 2.0 was launched.

In 2014, Streetbank merged with Freeconomy, a similar organisation set up by Mark Boyle (the moneyless man). Mark continued as part of the Streetbank leadership team.

On 1 March 2024 a notice appeared on the website announcing the closure of the platform. It stated "Since we launched there have been many other similar services launched that have proven to be more viral, more able to reach a critical mass in more neighbourhoods. These busier services have meant that our community stopped growing several years ago and doesn't justify continuing."

The announcement ended with the comment: "we salute these other services and hope that you will use them and embue them with the same goodness you brought to Streetbank!"

== Press articles ==
- Aljazeera "Local Hero: Sam Stephens ... founded Streetbank website with Ryan Davies in 2010, a "people's bank" for more sustainable existence".
- The Huffington Post "Putting the 'Social' Back into Social Networks..."
- Daily Candy "Borrow from, Lend to and Share with Your Neighbours"
- London Evening Standard "Local website for neighbours who like to give and share"
- The Big Issue "Streetbank shows that everyone can have good neighbours"
- The Guardian "Students: where to find free stuff"
