= Avoiding Mass Extinctions Engine =

AMEE
- Industry: Environmental sustainability and computer software
- Founded: 2008 in London, UK
- Founder: Gavin Starks
- Fate: Acquired by PI ltd
- Key people: Tyler Christie (CEO at exit in 2015)
- Website: www.amee.com

Avoiding Mass Extinctions Engine (abbreviated AMEE) was an environmental data company which provides a free public database of companies' environmental and financial performances. It also offered a paid analytics service to help businesses identify risk in their supply chains.

== Overview ==
AMEE created an individual company profile for every business and organisation in the UK (over 3.6 million in total). Profiles are pre-filled with a range of financial and environmental data, including annual turnover, number of employees and annual carbon emissions.

AMEE's data comes from a variety of sources. Where a company has not publicly declared its carbon emissions AMEE models its emissions with a series of algorithms. The models make use of data elements such as number of employees, type of business and geographical location.

Companies are then ranked against industry peers based on their AMEE Score.

All the data displayed on amee.com is free of charge and publicly available. Companies are free to edit and update the data that is displayed on amee.com. By reporting their environmental performance on amee.com companies demonstrate their commitment to transparency and to reducing carbon emissions throughout the supply chain.

== AMEE Score ==
The AMEE Score is a business efficiency metric that rates environmental impact in terms of annual carbon emissions relative to revenue, expressed as a 1–100 score. It helps enable direct comparison of the environmental efficiency of companies within the same industry sector, based on the UK 2007 Standard Industrial Classification (SIC).

== Background ==
AMEE was initially developed as a software project in 2005 by UK company Dgen and founder Gavin Starks. It enabled any climate campaign to use a common standard for Carbon-Footprint Profiling and Measurement. From 2007 AMEE was used for the UK Government's carbon calculator for its "Act on CO2" campaign against global warming.

AMEE UK Limited was created in 2008 and then raised venture capital funding. In 2010 it secured $5.5m series B financing from Amadeus Capital Partners in addition to existing investors O’Reilly AlphaTech Ventures and Union Square Ventures.

In 2012 AMEE focused its work on estimating the carbon emissions for every business and organisation in the UK. It also began working with large organisations such as the UK Government Procurement Service to identify and manage risk in their supply chains.

AMEE was acquired in 2015 by PredictX.
