= Technological escalation =

Technological escalation describes the situation where two parties in competition tend to employ continual technological improvements in their attempt to defeat each other. Technology is defined here as a creative invention, either in the form of an object or a methodology. An example is the mutual escalation seen between e-mail spammers and the programmers of spam filters and other anti-spam techniques. Although escalation is usually meant negatively, if two companies are in an escalating competition to produce the best widget, the consumer benefits because they get a choice between better and better widgets.

== See also ==
- Arms race
- Competition
- Conflict (disambiguation)
- Industrial Revolution
- Second Industrial Revolution
- Technological escalation during World War II
- War
