= Songkick =

Concert discovery service by Warner Music Group

- Type: Private
- Industry: Live music
- Founded: 2007
- Founders: Matt Jones; Ian Hogarth
- Headquarters: London, United Kingdom
- Area served: Global
- Brands: Songkick, Tourbox
- Number of employees: 30
- Parent: Suno
- Website: songkick.com

Songkick is a concert discovery service. The service enables users to search for upcoming concert events in their area, and also track individual artists to receive notifications of upcoming shows in their area. It also provides services for artist teams to manage and promote tour dates globally.

The company was first established in 2007 as a Y Combinator-backed startup. In 2015, it merged with CrowdSurge—a company that provided services for running and managing ticket sales on behalf of artists. In 2017, the Songkick concert discovery service and brand was sold to WMG, while the ticketing assets were sold to Live Nation Entertainment in 2018 to settle a lawsuit with the company. In November 2025, WMG sold Songkick to artificial intelligence firm Suno as part of a larger partnership with the company.

In 2012, Songkick launched Tourbox, a tool for artists or artist teams to manage and distribute their live event dates worldwide, across multiple digital platforms.

== History ==
Songkick was founded in 2007 by Ian Hogarth, Michelle You and Pete Smith as part of the 2007 Y Combinator program, a seed accelerator that focuses on technology start-ups. Songkick's initial business model, based on its concert discovery service, was based on referral fees from ticketing companies. The company launched its first mobile application in 2011. In June 2015, Songkick merged with CrowdSurge, an artist ticketing services provider, with the combined company operating under the Songkick name.

CrowdSurge was founded by Matt Jones in 2008, and he and Hogarth said they decided to merge the two companies to correct “a massive inefficiency in the market.” Songkick had systems to detect ticket resellers, reduce the incentive for reselling (e.g., by creating general admissions areas, rather than assigned seats) and make it easier for regular fans to buy tickets (e.g., by having multiple releases of tickets, not just one release) that have reduced the percentage of concert tickets that end up in the secondary market to 1.5 percent of the total. Jones and Hogarth served as co-CEOs of Songkick until Jones took on the role of CEO in January 2016.

In December 2016, Songkick filed an antitrust lawsuit against Live Nation Entertainment and its Ticketmaster division. The lawsuit was later amended to accuse it of stealing trade secrets, by means of former Songkick employees who had joined the company.

In July 2017, Warner Music Group acquired Songkick, including its concert discovery service and brand, but excluding its ticketing business and associated "pending litigation". Songkick shuttered its ticketing business in October; Jones described Live Nation as having "effectively blocked our U.S. ticketing business". In January 2018, shortly prior to a pending trial, Live Nation settled the lawsuit for $110 million, and also acquired the remaining intellectual property not sold to WMG for an undisclosed amount.

In December 2020, Live Nation agreed to pay a $10 million fine for violations of the Computer Fraud and Abuse Act, wire fraud, and conspiracy to commit wire fraud, after admitting that an employee from an unspecified competitor to Ticketmaster had used stolen credentials to obtain information on ticket presales, instructed them on how to exploit the competitor's URL generation system to view details on concerts that had not yet been announced, and was promoted by the company after presenting said information.

In November 2025, Songkick was acquired from WMG by generative AI company Suno; the sale came alongside a $500 million settlement and partnership with WMG that allows WMG artists to opt into the use of their recordings and likenesses as part of Suno's AI music service. It was suggested that Suno was primarily interested in the behavioural data of its users, with a later job listing stating that there was "a massive untapped opportunity to reimagine what live music discovery experiences look like when powered by AI."

== API ==
Songkick launched their new API in 2009 at the inaugural Music Hack Day. In the past they encouraged developers to build things on top of it, however they are no longer approving API requests for educational or hobbyist purposes and have a standard license fee starting from $500 per month.

== Public response ==
The service has received generally positive reviews from tech publications for its core functionality. PCMag noted positive feedback regarding the app's push notifications for tour announcements, venue details, and ticket pre-sales, as well as its seamless integration with music streaming services Spotify and Apple Music. However, technical reviews and user feedback have highlighted occasional limitations with automated event tracking, such as notifications arriving after tickets have sold out, or errors in linking artists to unverified or canceled concert dates. Common complaints and negative reviews on Trustpilot report that automated systems occasionally link artists to fake, canceled, or unverified concerts that the performers are not actually attending. Some users report receiving alerts only after tickets have already sold out. Multiple reviewers note a lack of responsive customer service or difficulty resolving technical or account glitches, and subset of reviews complain about unwanted promotional emails or confusion regarding account notifications. In acknowledging these issues, the company support interface provides users with the option to report incorrect listings, and a refund policy, with the proviso that "all refund requests, order information changes and payment enquiries must be directed to the seller."

== Awards and recognition ==
- 2017: Webby Awards Honoree for Best Music Mobile Site/App
- 2017: Fast Company - Fifth Most Innovative Company in Music, 2017
- 2017: Music Week Awards - Nominated for Best Ticketing Company
- 2014: Winner, Best Technology for Marketing an Event / Building Event Attendance
- 2012: Webby Awards Honoree for Best Music Mobile Site/App
- 2011: Music Week Consumer-Facing Digital Music Service of the Year
- 2010: #3 on Billboard Magazine's 10 Best Digital Music Startups of 2010
- 2010: Best Innovation Award at the 2010 BT Digital Music Awards
