= Nokia =

Finnish multinational corporation

Coordinates: 60.225°N 24.756°E

Nokia Corporation
- Logo used since 2023

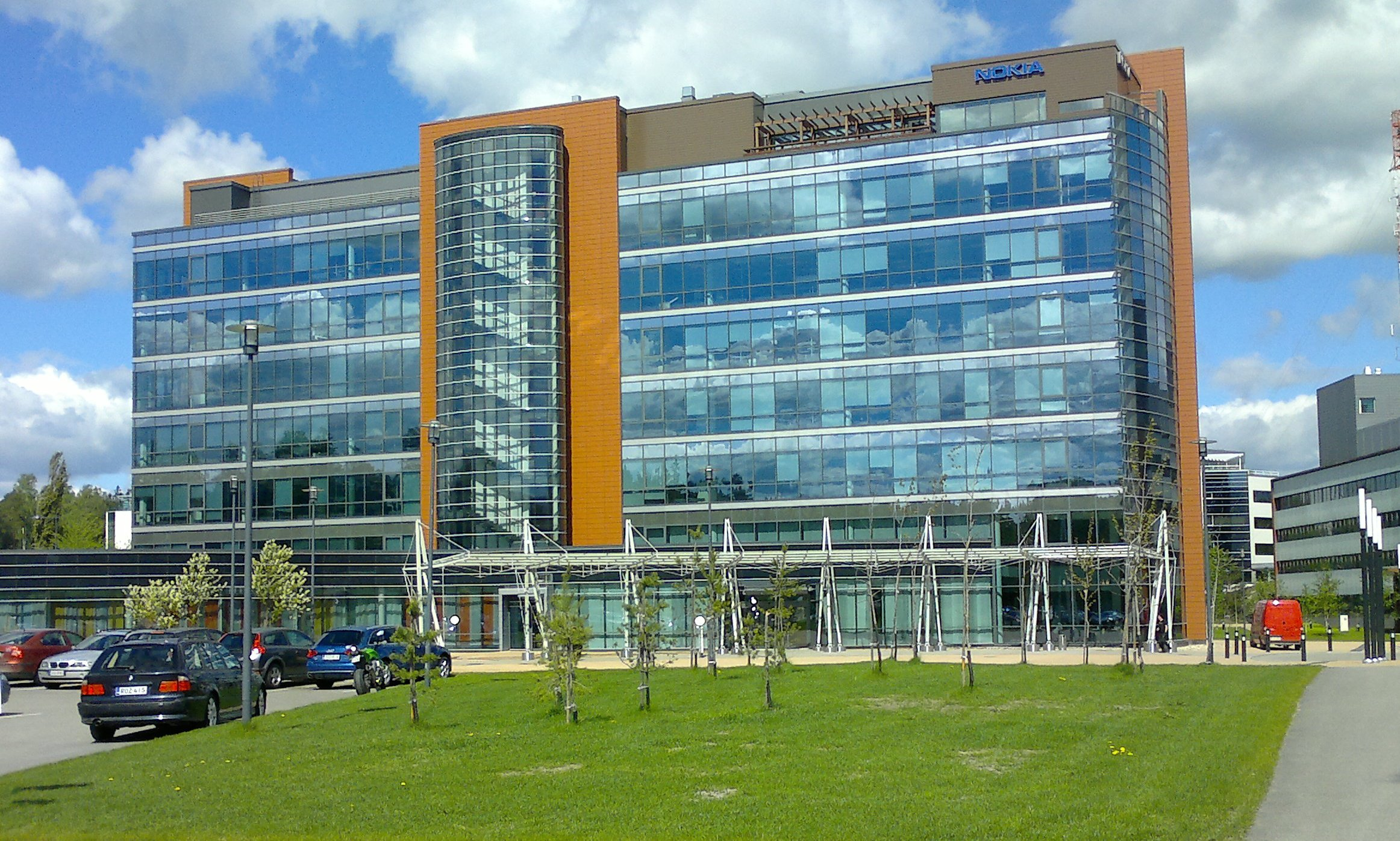
- Headquarters in Espoo since September 2019
- Native name: Nokia Oyj
- Type: Public
- Traded as: Nasdaq Helsinki: NOKIA; OMX Helsinki 25 component
- ISIN: FI0009000681
- Industry: Telecommunications; Technology; Electronics
- Predecessors: Nokia Aktiebolag; Suomen Kumitehdas Oy; Suomen Kaapelitehdas Oy; (pre-1967 merger)
- Founded: 12 May 1865; 161 years ago in Tampere, Grand Duchy of Finland
- Founders: Fredrik Idestam; Leo Mechelin; Eduard Polón
- Headquarters: Espoo, Finland
- Area served: Worldwide
- Key people: Timo Ihamuotila (chairman); Justin Hotard (president & CEO)
- Products: List of Nokia products
- Revenue: ▲€19.889 billion (2025)
- Operating income: ▲€2.000 billion (2025)
- Net income: ▼€651 million (2025)
- Total assets: ▼€37.597 billion (2025)
- Total equity: ▲€20.967 billion (2025)
- Number of employees: ▼78,005 (2025)
- Divisions: Nokia Networks; Nokia Technologies
- Subsidiaries: Bell Labs; NGP Capital; Nuage Networks; Radio Frequency Systems
- Website: nokia.com

Nokia Corporation (Note: Natively Nokia Oyj in Finnish, and Nokia Abp in Swedish. UK: /ˈnɒkiə/, US: /ˈnoʊkiə/, Finnish: [ˈnokiɑ].) is a Finnish multinational telecommunications, information technology, and consumer electronics corporation, originally established as a pulp mill in 1865. Nokia's main headquarters are in Espoo, Finland, in the Helsinki metropolitan area, but the company's actual roots are in the Tampere region of Pirkanmaa. In 2020, Nokia employed approximately 92,000 people across more than 100 countries, did business in more than 130 countries, and reported annual revenues of around €23 billion. Nokia is a public limited company listed on the Nasdaq Helsinki and New York Stock Exchange. It was the world's 415th-largest company measured by 2016 revenues, according to the Fortune Global 500, having peaked at 85th place in 2009. It is a component of the Euro Stoxx 50 stock market index.

The company has operated in various industries over the past 150 years. It was founded as a pulp mill and had long been associated with rubber and cables, but since the 1990s has focused on large-scale telecommunications infrastructure, technology development, and licensing. Nokia made significant contributions to the mobile telephony industry, assisting in the development of the GSM, 3G, and LTE standards. For a decade beginning in 1998, Nokia was the largest worldwide vendor of mobile phones and smartphones. In the later 2000s, however, Nokia suffered from a series of poor management decisions and soon saw its share of the mobile phone market drop sharply.

After a partnership with Microsoft and Nokia's subsequent market struggles, in 2014, Microsoft bought Nokia's mobile phone business (Nokia Devices & Services), incorporating it as Microsoft Mobile. After the sale, Nokia began to focus more on its telecommunications infrastructure business and on Internet of things technologies, marked by the divestiture of its Here mapping division and the acquisition of Alcatel-Lucent, including its Bell Labs research organization. The company also experimented with virtual reality and digital health, the latter through the purchase of Withings. The Nokia brand returned to the mobile and smartphone market in 2016 through a licensing arrangement with HMD, who continue to manufacture and sell phones under the Nokia brand as of September, 2026. Nokia continues to be a major patent licensor for most large mobile phone vendors. As of 2018, Nokia is the world's third-largest network equipment manufacturer.

The company was viewed with national pride by Finns, as its mobile phone business made it by far the largest worldwide company and brand from Finland. At its peak in 2000, Nokia accounted for 4% of the country's GDP, 21% of total exports, and 70% of the Nasdaq Helsinki market capital.

== History ==
=== 1865–1967 ===
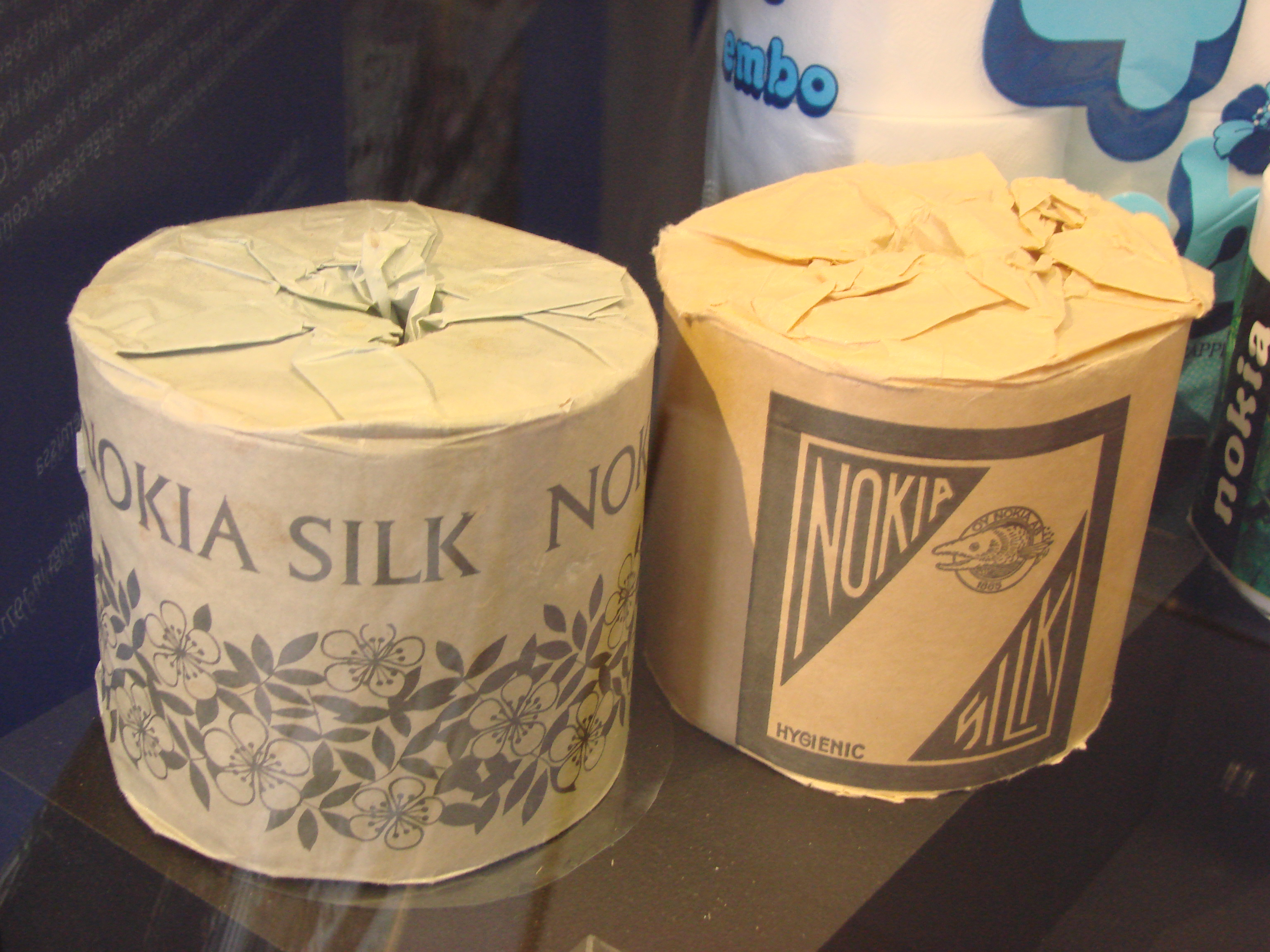
Rolls of toilet paper produced by Nokia in the 1960s, Vapriikki Museum Centre, Tampere

Nokia's history dates from 1865, when mining engineer Fredrik Idestam established a pulp mill on the shores of the Tammerkoski rapids near the town of Tampere, Finland (then a Grand Duchy under the Russian Empire's rule). A second pulp mill was opened in 1868 near the neighboring town of Nokia, where there were better hydropower resources. In 1871, Idestam, together with a friend Leo Mechelin, formed a shared company and called it Nokia Ab (in Swedish, Nokia Company being the English equivalent), after the site of the second pulp mill.

Idestam retired in 1896, making Mechelin the company's chairman; he expanded into electricity generation by 1902, which Idestam had opposed. In 1904, Suomen Gummitehdas (Finnish Rubber Works), a rubber business founded by Eduard Polón, established a factory near the town of Nokia and used its name.

In 1922, in the now independent Finland, Nokia Ab entered into a partnership with the Finnish Rubber Works and Kaapelitehdas (the Cable Factory), all now jointly under the leadership of Polón. The rubber company grew rapidly when it moved to the Nokia region in the 1930s to take advantage of the electricity supply, and the cable company soon did too.

Nokia at the time also made respirators for both civilian and military use, from the 1930s well into the early 1990s.

=== 1967–1988 ===
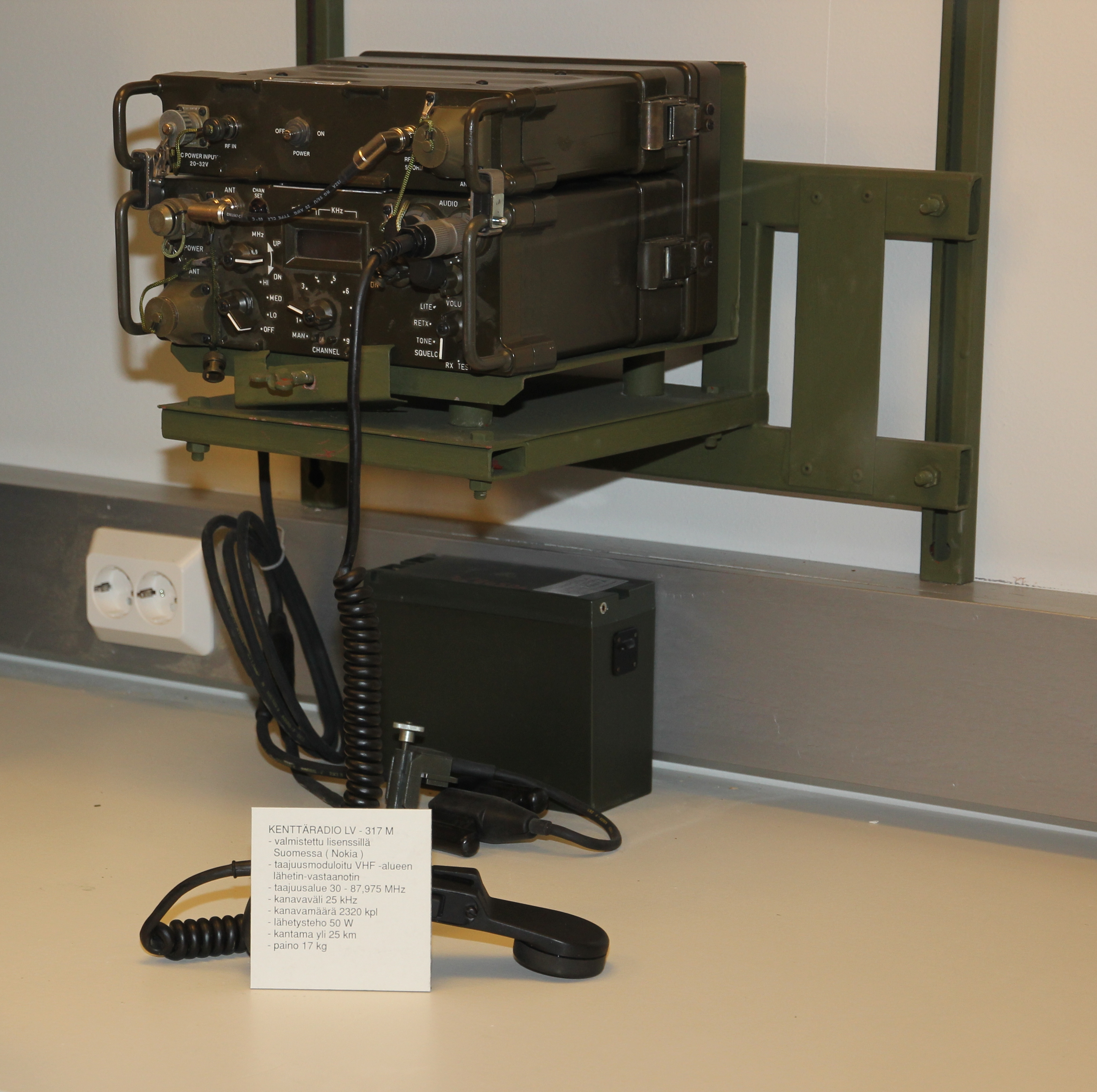
LV 317M military radio in the Hämeenlinna artillery museum

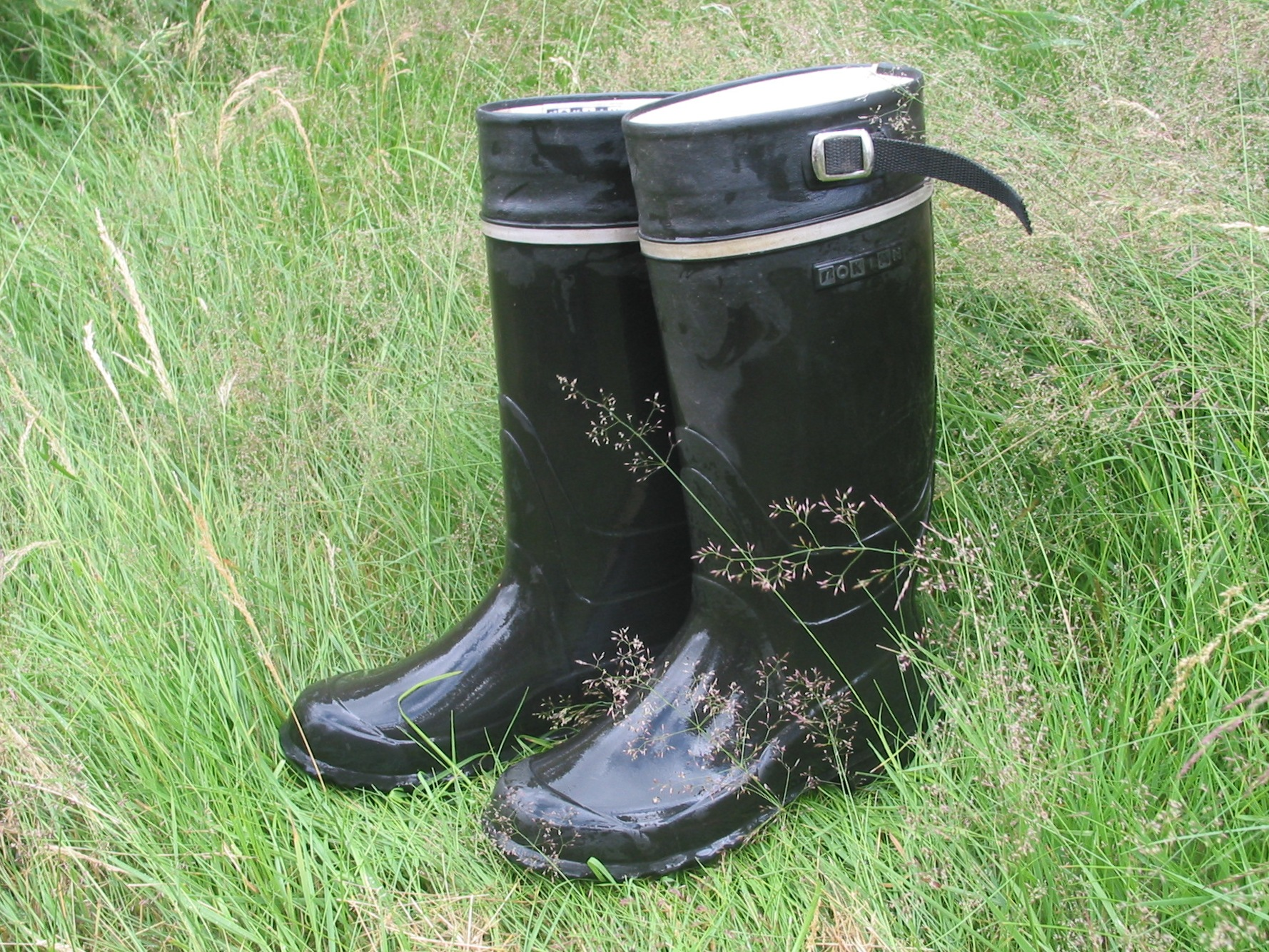
Nokian rubber boots

In 1967, the three companies – Nokia, Kaapelitehdas, and Finnish Rubber Works – merged to create a new Nokia Corporation, restructured into four major businesses: forestry, cable, rubber, and electronics. In the early 1970s, it entered the networking and radio industries.Nokia started making military equipment for Finland's defence forces (Puolustusvoimat), such as the Sanomalaite M/90 communicator in 1983, and the M61 gas mask first developed in the 1960s. Nokia was now also making professional mobile radios, telephone switches, capacitors and chemicals.

After Finland's trade agreement with the Soviet Union in the 1960s, Nokia expanded into the Soviet market. It soon widened trade, ranging from automatic telephone exchanges to robotics among others; by the late 1970s, the Soviet Union became a major market for Nokia, yielding high profits. The U.S. government became increasingly concerned of the possible export of items it deemed as high technology, such as digital telephone exchanges, to the Soviet Union in the 1980s. This led to Finland entering the Coordinating Committee for Multilateral Export Controls in 1987. This was a demonstration of Finland balancing between both sides, as it was neutral during the Cold War.

In 1977, Kari Kairamo became CEO and transformed the company's businesses. By this time, Finland was becoming what has been called "Nordic Japan". Under his leadership, Nokia acquired many companies, including television maker Salora in 1984, followed by Swedish electronics and computer maker Luxor AB in 1985, and French television maker Oceanic in 1987. This made Nokia the third-largest television manufacturer of Europe (behind Philips and Thomson). The existing brands continued to be used until the end of the television business in 1996.

In 1979, in a joint venture with Salora Oy, Nokia established Mobira, a mobile radio telephone manufacturer that would go on to become the foundation of Nokia's mobile phone business.

In 1981, Mobira launched the Nordic Mobile Telephone (NMT) service, the world's first international cellular network and the first to allow international roaming. In 1982, Mobira launched the Mobira Senator car phone, Nokia's first mobile phone. At that time, the company had no interest in producing mobile phones, which the executive board regarded as akin to James Bond's gadgets: improbably futuristic and niche devices.

In 1984, Nokia acquired Mobira.

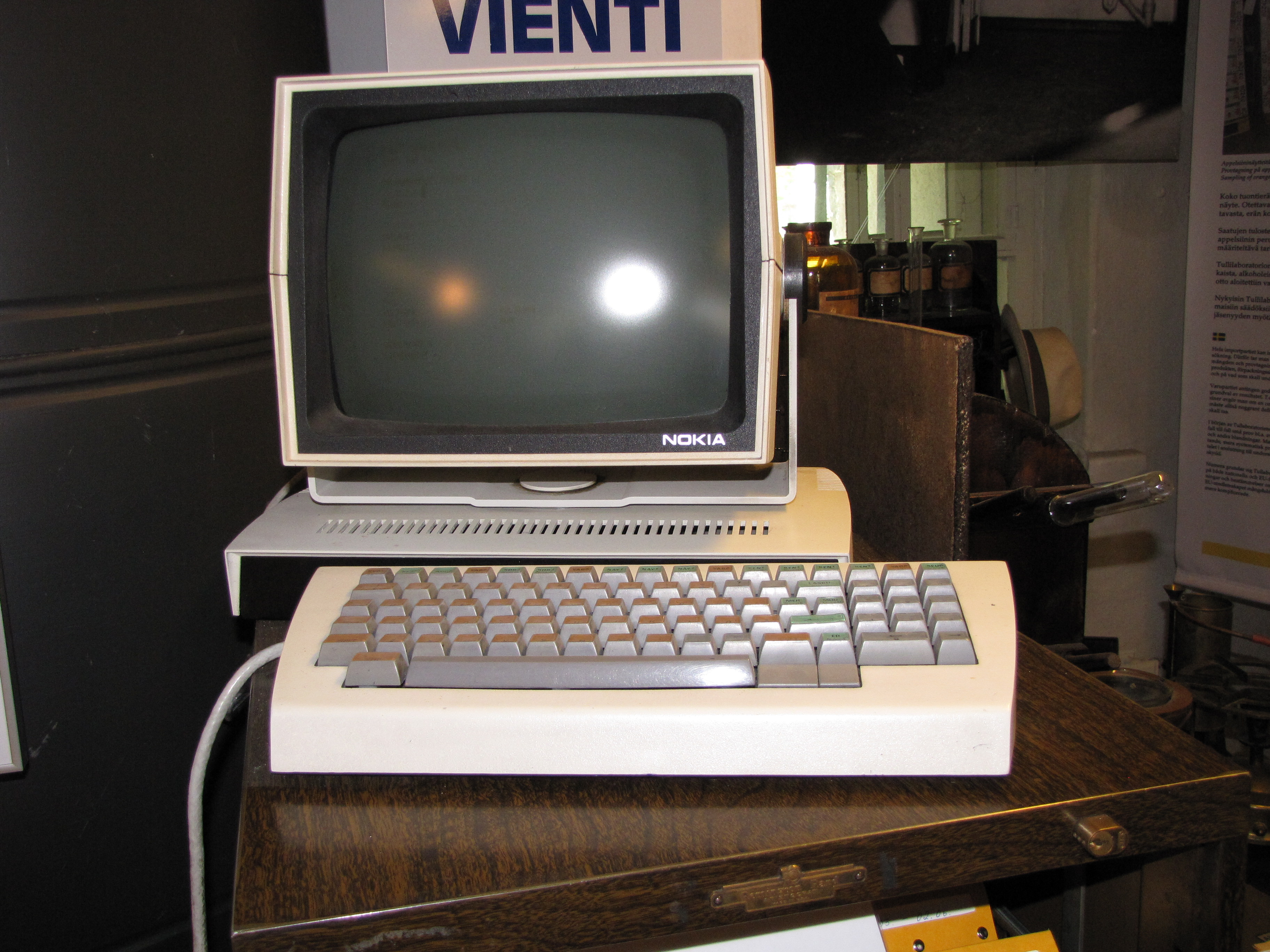
Nokia Mikko 3 minicomputer, 1978

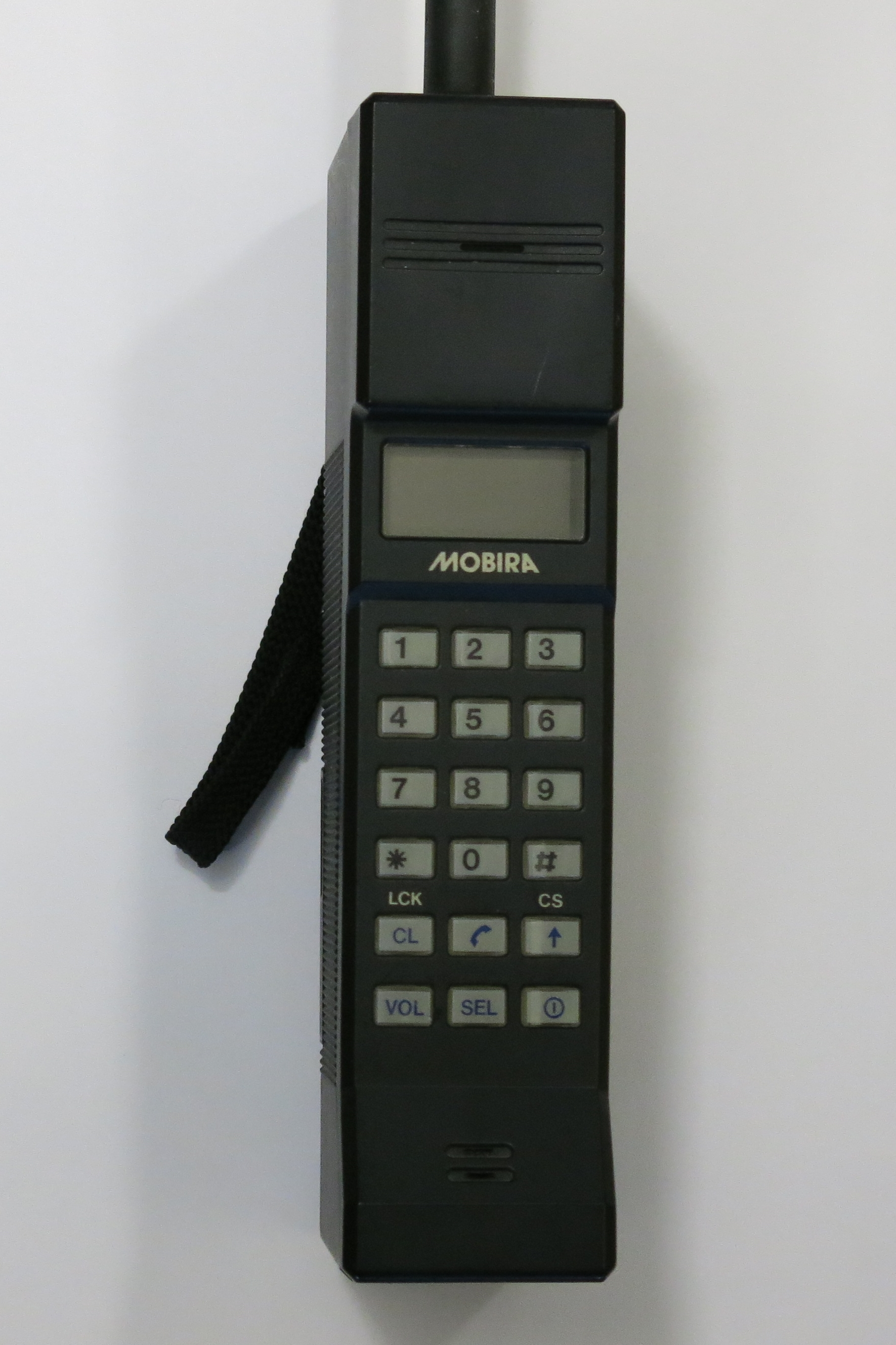
Mobira Cityman 450, 1985

In 1987, Nokia acquired Schaub-Lorenz, the consumer operations of Germany's Standard Elektrik Lorenz (SEL), which included its "Schaub-Lorenz" and "Graetz" brands. It was originally part of American conglomerate International Telephone & Telegraph (ITT), and after the acquisition products were sold under the "ITT Nokia" brand, despite SEL's sale to Compagnie Générale d'Electricité (CGE), the predecessor of Alcatel, in 1986.

In 1987, Kaapelitehdas discontinued production of cables at its Helsinki factory after 44 years, effectively shutting down the sub-company.

On 1 April 1988, Nokia bought the Information Systems division of Ericsson, which had originated as the Datasaab computer division of Swedish aircraft and car manufacturer Saab. Ericsson Information Systems made Alfaskop terminals, typewriters, minicomputers and Ericsson-branded IBM compatible PCs. The merger with Nokia's Information Systems division—which since 1981 had a line of personal computers called MikroMikko—resulted in the name Nokia Data.

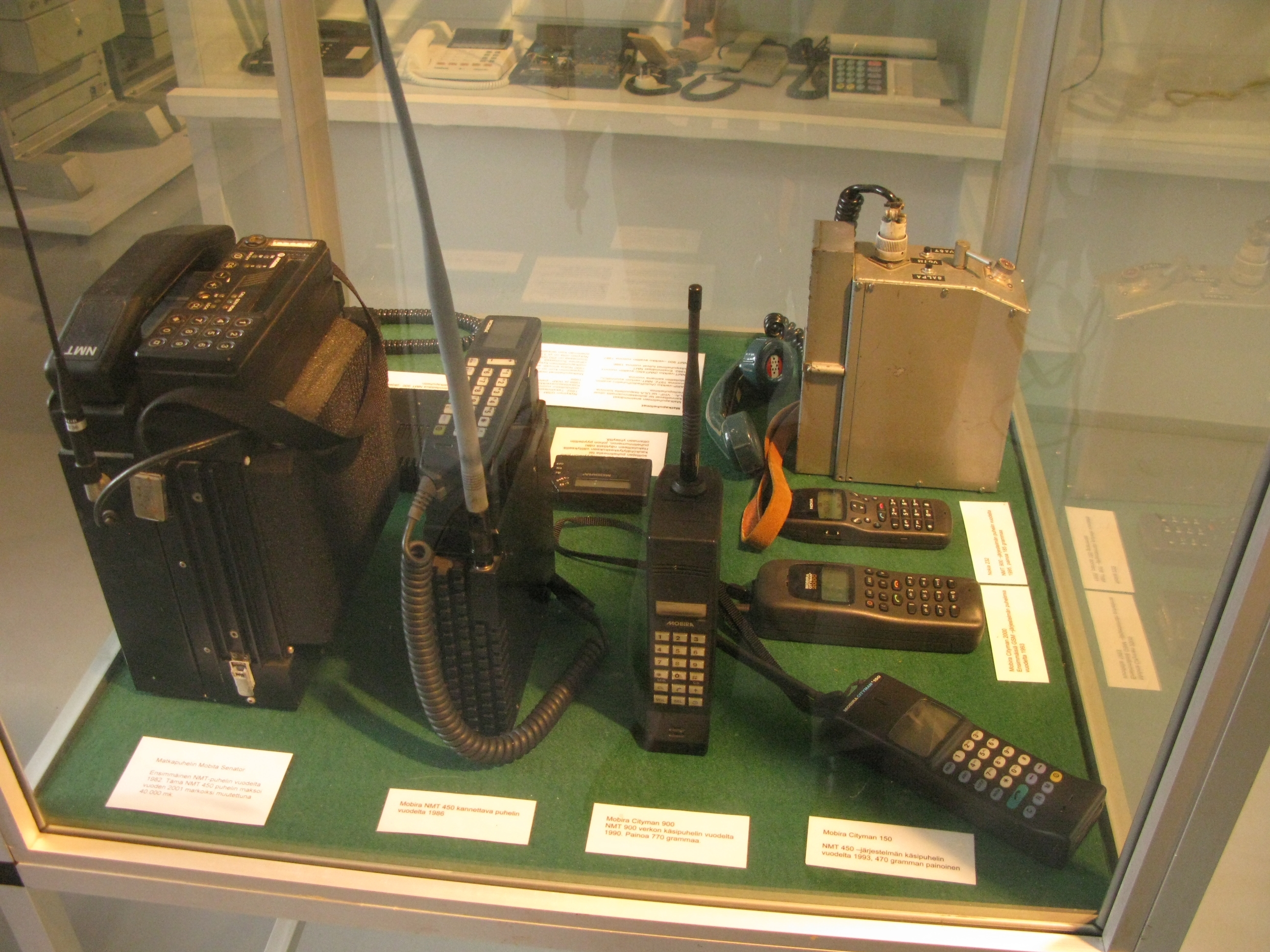
Various Mobira phones on display in a museum in Helsinki, Finland. The Mobira Senator (first from the left), was one of the first phones compatible with the NMT-network. It weighed around 9.8 kg (22 lb).

After all these acquisitions, Nokia's revenue base became US$2.7 billion.

CEO Kairamo killed himself on 11 December 1988.

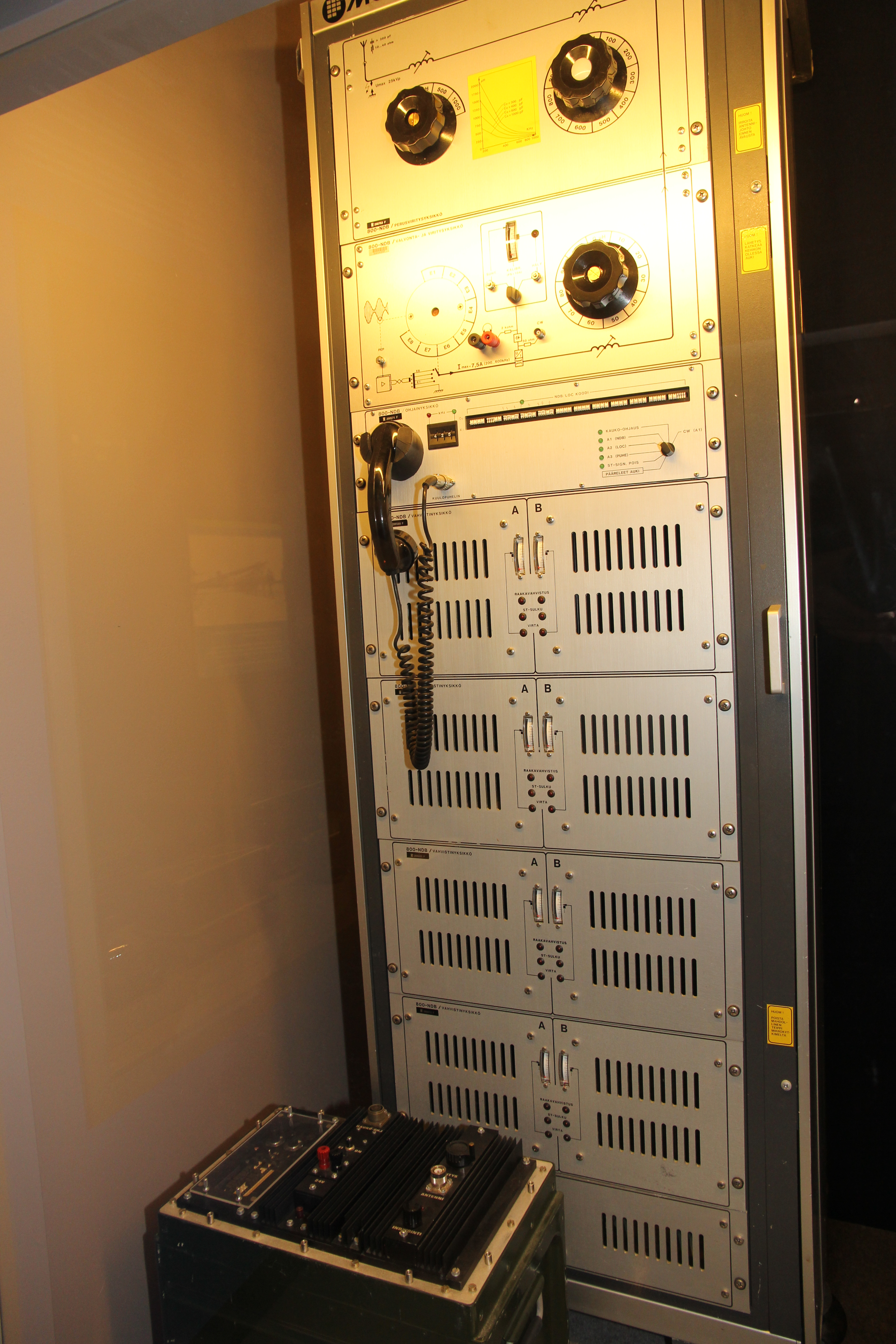
Mobira 800-NDB non-directional beacon located in the Finnish Air Force signals museum

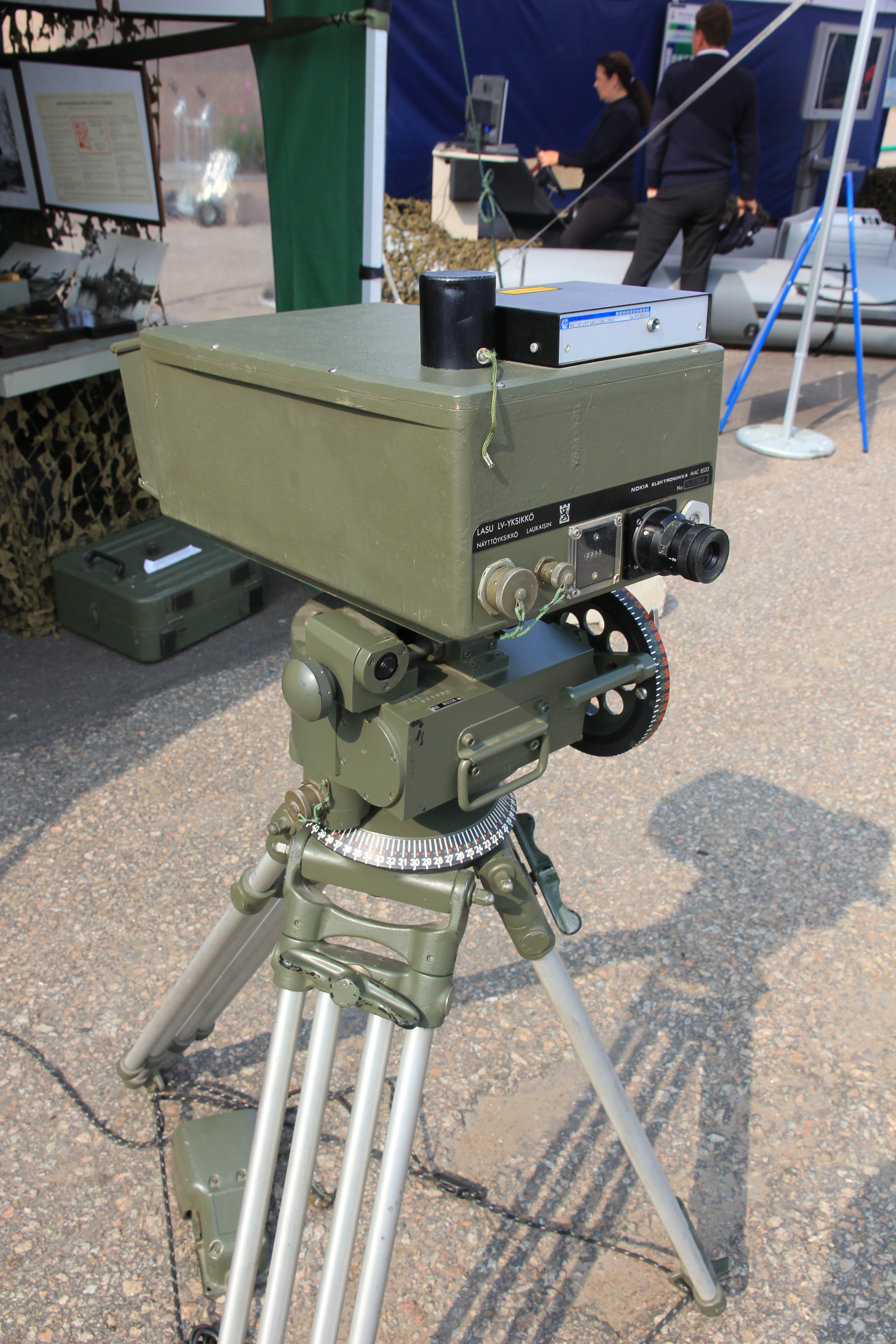
Nokia MAC 8532 laser rangefinder previously used by Finnish coastal artillery

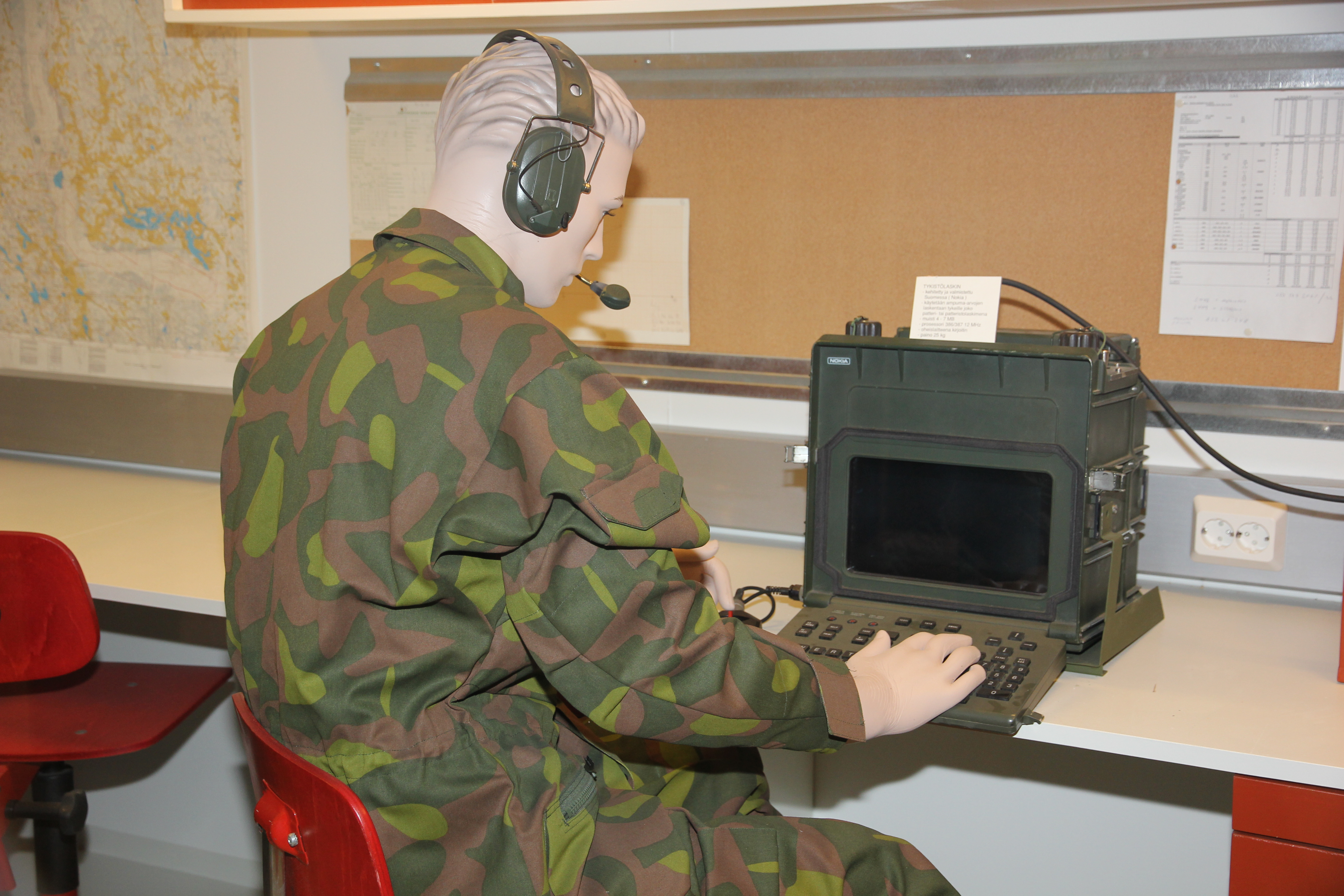
Hämeenlinna artillery museum display containing fire control officer with Nokia artillery calculator in Finnish artillery battalion command post

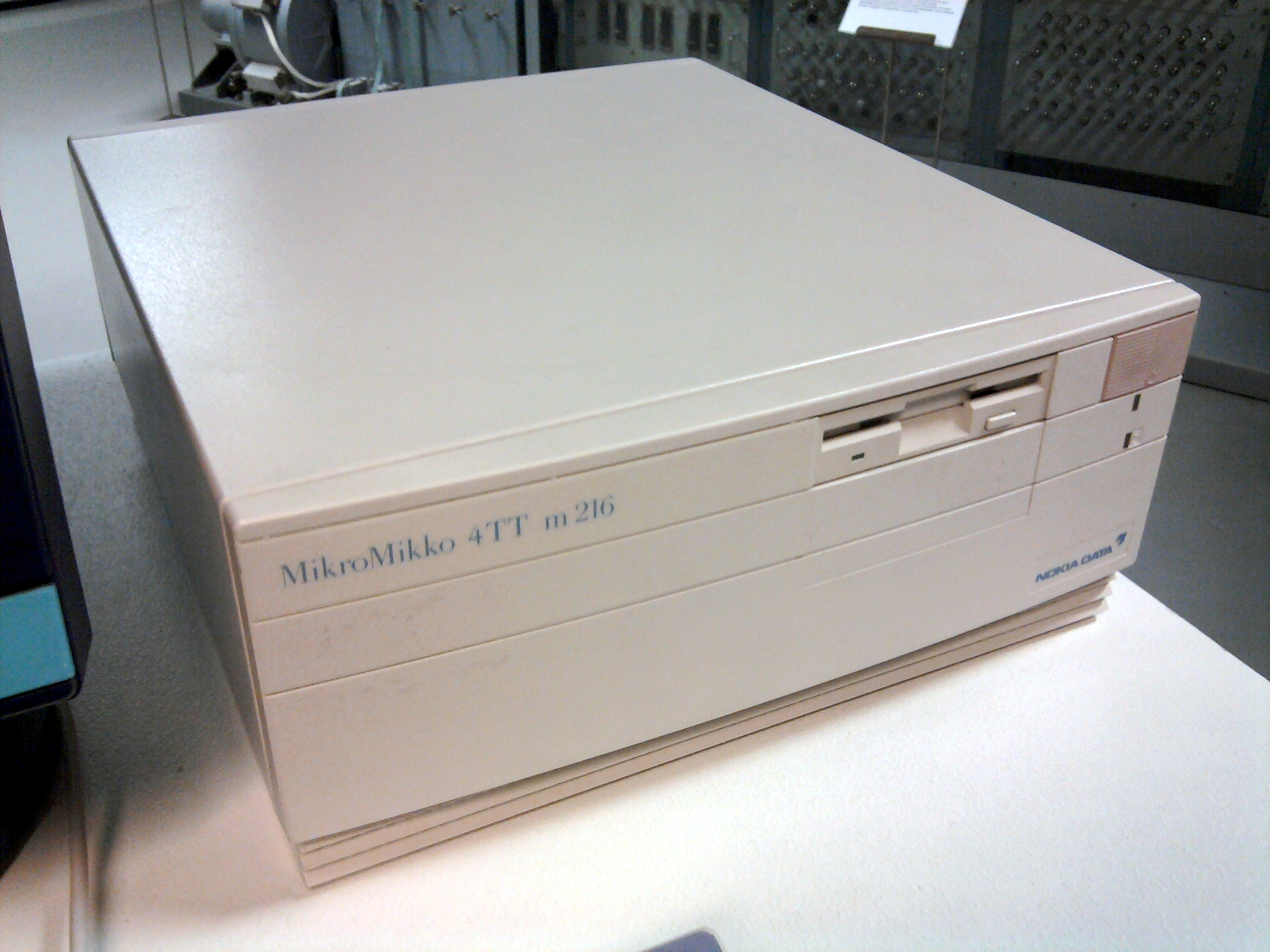
Late 1980s MikroMikko 4 TT m216 desktop computer in the Museum of Technology, Helsinki, Finland

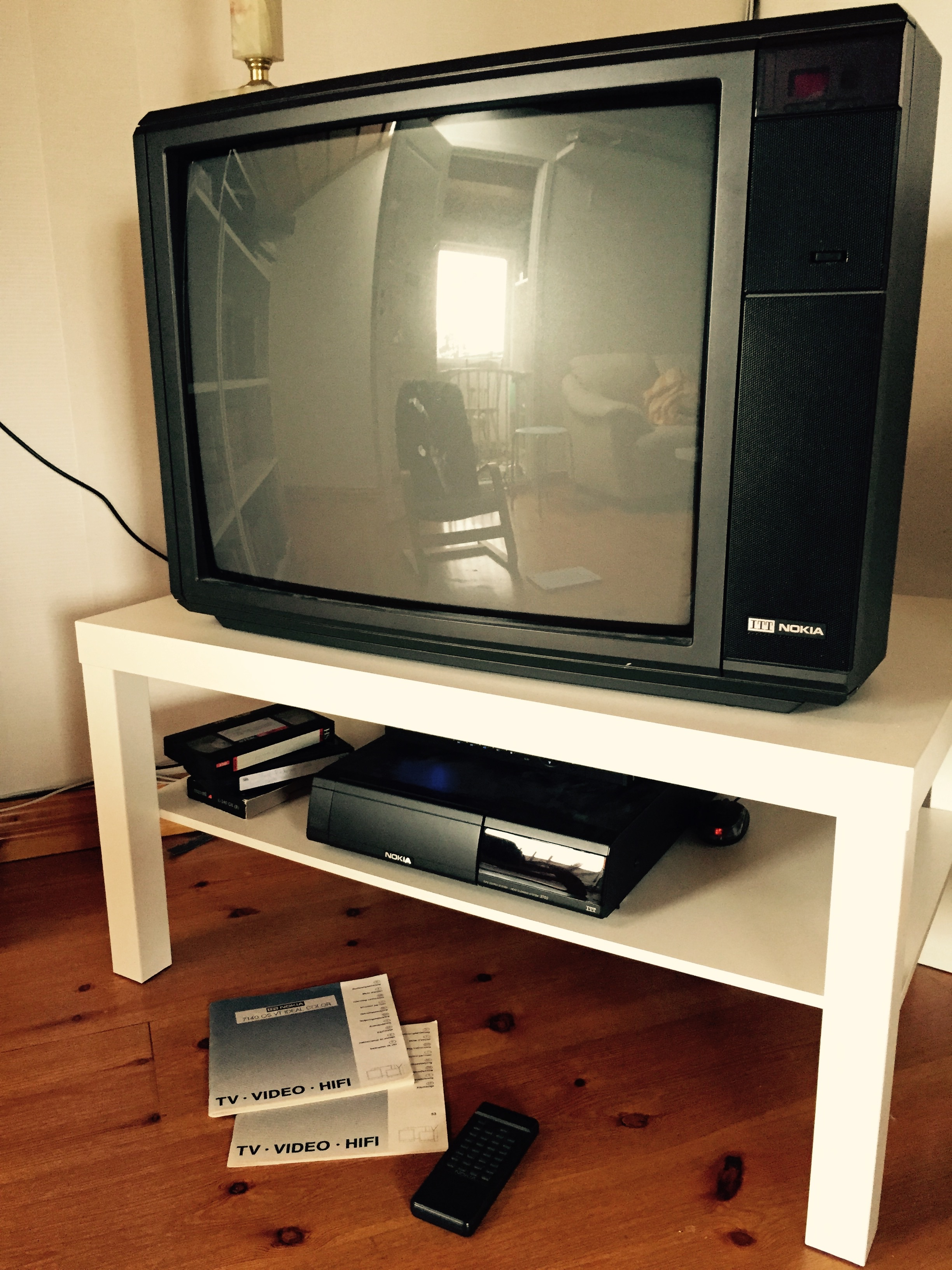
ITT Nokia television with an ITT Nokia VCR (ITT/SEL)

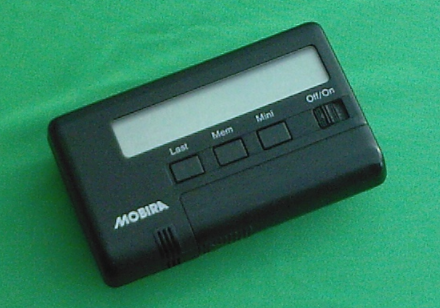
A 1986 Mobira pager

=== 1988–2010 ===
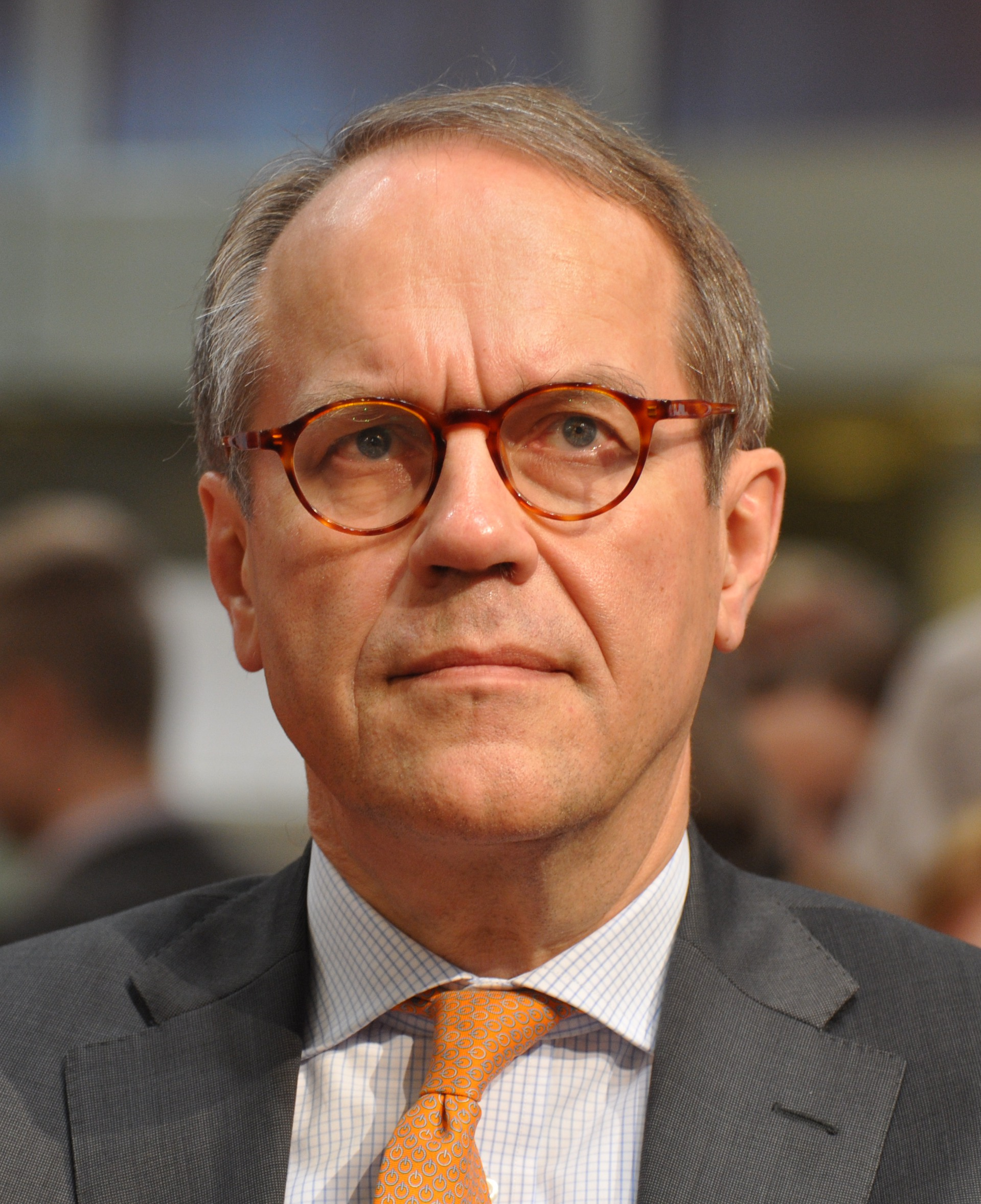
Jorma Ollila, who oversaw the rise of Nokia in the mobile phone market as CEO from 1992 to 2006

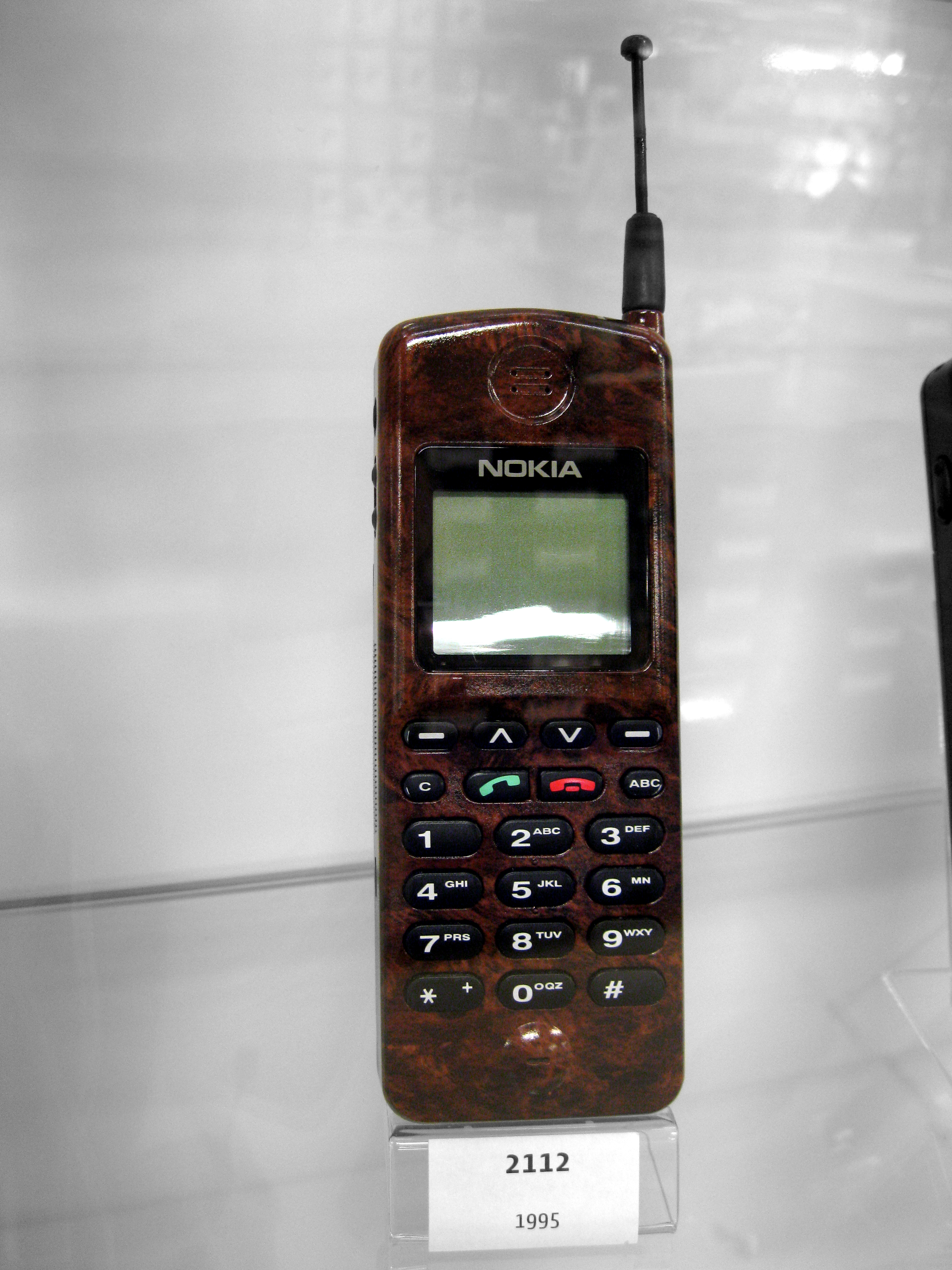
Nokia 2112 NHE-4AX phone

Following Simo Vuorilehto's appointment as CEO, a major restructuring was planned. With 11 groups within the company, Vuorilehto divested industrial units he deemed as un-strategic. Nokian Tyres (Nokian Renkaat), a tyre producer originally formed as a division of Finnish Rubber Works in 1932, split away from Nokia Corporation in 1988. Two years later, in 1990, Finnish Rubber Works followed suit. In 1991, Nokia sold its computer division, Nokia Data, to UK-based International Computers Limited (ICL), the precursor of Fujitsu Siemens. Investors thought of this as financial trouble and Nokia's stock price sank as a result. Finland was now also experiencing its worst recession in living memory, and the collapse of the Soviet Union, a major customer, made matters worse.

Vuorilehto quit in January 1992 and was replaced by Jorma Ollila, who had been the head of the mobile phone business from 1990 and advised against selling that division. Ollila decided to turn Nokia into a "telecom-oriented" company, and he eventually got rid of divisions like the power business. This strategy proved to be very successful, and the company grew rapidly in the following years. Nokia's operating profit went from negative in 1991 to $1 billion in 1995 and almost $4 billion by 1999.

Nokia's first fully portable mobile phone after the Mobira Senator was the Mobira Cityman 900 in 1987. Nokia assisted in the development of the GSM mobile standard in the 1980s and developed the first GSM network with Siemens, the predecessor to Nokia Siemens Network. The world's first GSM call was made by Finnish prime minister Harri Holkeri on 1 July 1991, using Nokia equipment on the 900 MHz band network built by Nokia and operated by Radiolinja. In November 1992, the Nokia 1011 launched, making it the first commercially available GSM mobile phone.

Salora Oy as a Nokia subsidiary ended in 1989 when the division was merged into Nokia-Mobira Oy. The brand continued to be used for televisions until 1995.

On 12 June 1996, Nokia announced the sale of its television business to Canada/Hong Kong-based Semi-Tech Corporation. The television manufacturing plant in Germany closed down in September 1996. The sale included a factory in Turku and the rights to use the Nokia, Finlux, Luxor, Salora, Schaub-Lorenz, and Oceanic brands until the end of 1999. Some of these brands were later sold to other companies.

Nokia was the first to launch digital satellite receivers in the UK, announced in March 1997. In August 1997, Nokia introduced the first digital satellite receiver with Common Interface (CI) support. In 1998, Nokia became the chosen supplier to produce the world's first digital terrestrial television set-top boxes by British Digital Broadcasting (BDB), which was eventually launched as ONdigital.

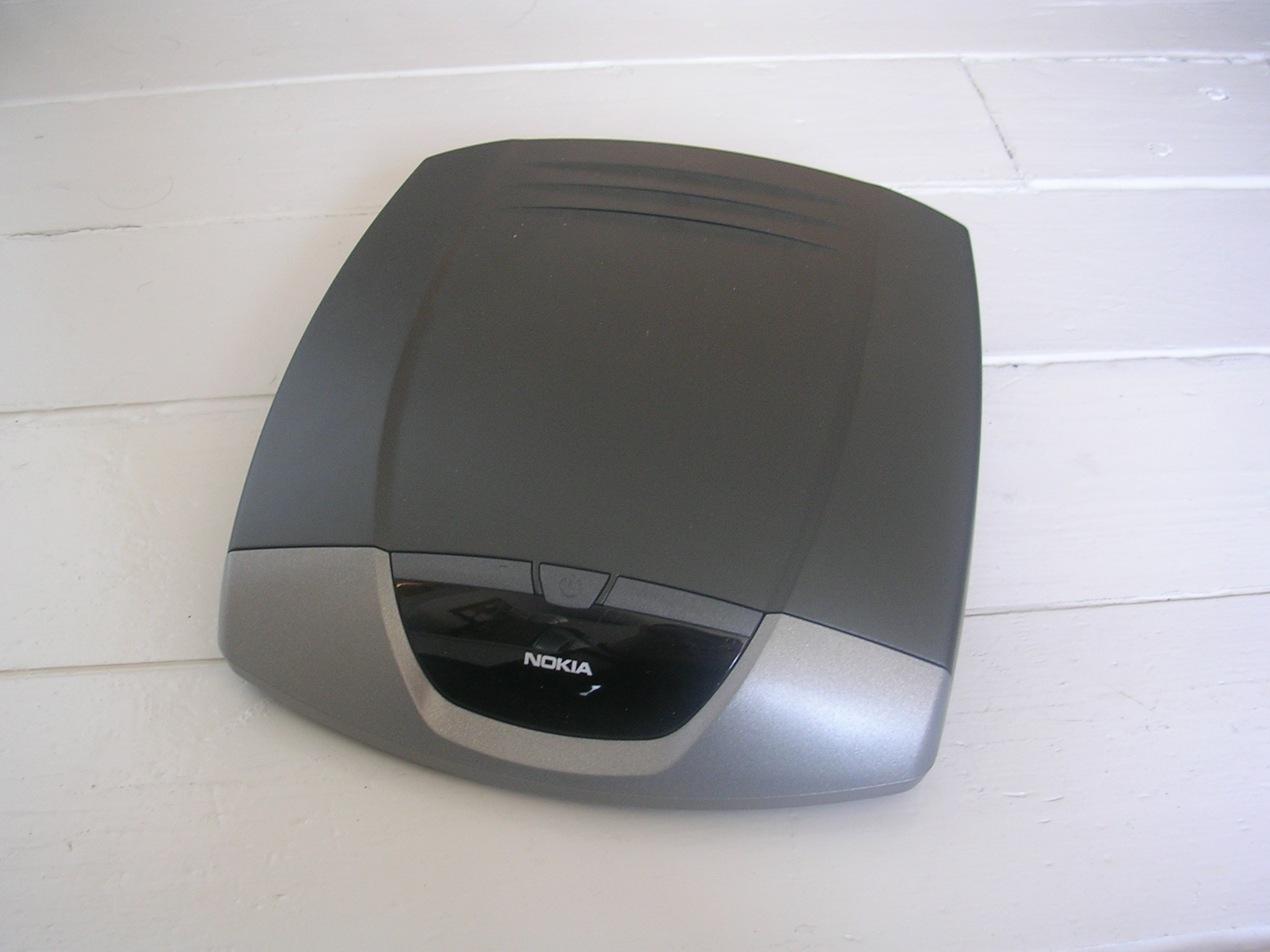
A Nokia Mediamaster set-top box

In October 1998, Nokia overtook Motorola to become the best-selling mobile phone brand and in December, manufactured its 100 millionth mobile phone. A major reason why Nokia grew against its main competitors Motorola and Ericsson was that it managed to cater to the consumer youth market and fashion-oriented consumers, most significantly with the Nokia 5110 and 3210 handsets, which featured a large range of colourful and replaceable back covers called Xpress-on. One of the earliest fashion phones in 1992, from Swiss watchmaker Swatch, was based on Nokia's 101 handset. The company would also form the Vertu division, creating luxury mobile handsets.

In April 1996, Nokia claimed its 447Xav and 447K monitors to be the first with stereo speakers and a subwoofer. In May 1999, Nokia introduced its first wireless LAN products. In January 2000, ViewSonic acquired Nokia Display Products, the division making displays for personal computers. On 26 April 2001, Nokia partnered with Telefónica to supply DSL modems and routers in Spain.

In 1997, Nokia established a joint venture with Brazilian electronics firm Gradiente where it was granted the license to manufacture variants of Nokia mobile phones locally under the Nokia and Gradiente brand names.

In 1998, Nokia cofounded Symbian Ltd., led by Psion, to create a new operating system for PDAs and smart mobile phones as a successor of EPOC32. They released the Nokia 9210 Communicator running Symbian OS in 2001 and later that year created the Symbian Series 60 platform, later introducing it with its first camera phone, the Nokia 7650. Both Nokia and Symbian eventually became the largest smartphone hardware and software maker, respectively, and in February 2004, Nokia became the largest shareholder of Symbian Ltd. Nokia acquired the entire company in June 2008 and then formed the Symbian Foundation as its successor.

In 1998 alone, the company had sales revenue of $20 billion, making $2.6 billion profit. By 2000, Nokia employed over 55,000 people and had a market share of 30% in the mobile phone market, almost twice as large as its nearest competitor, Motorola. The company was operating in 140 countries as of 1999. It was reported at the time that some people believed Nokia to be a Japanese company. Between 1996 and 2001, Nokia's turnover increased fivefold, from €6.5 billion to €31 billion. Meanwhile, a Reader's Digest survey held near end 2000 showed that Nokia was the "most trusted brand in Europe", ranking better than Sony, Canon, and Nivea.

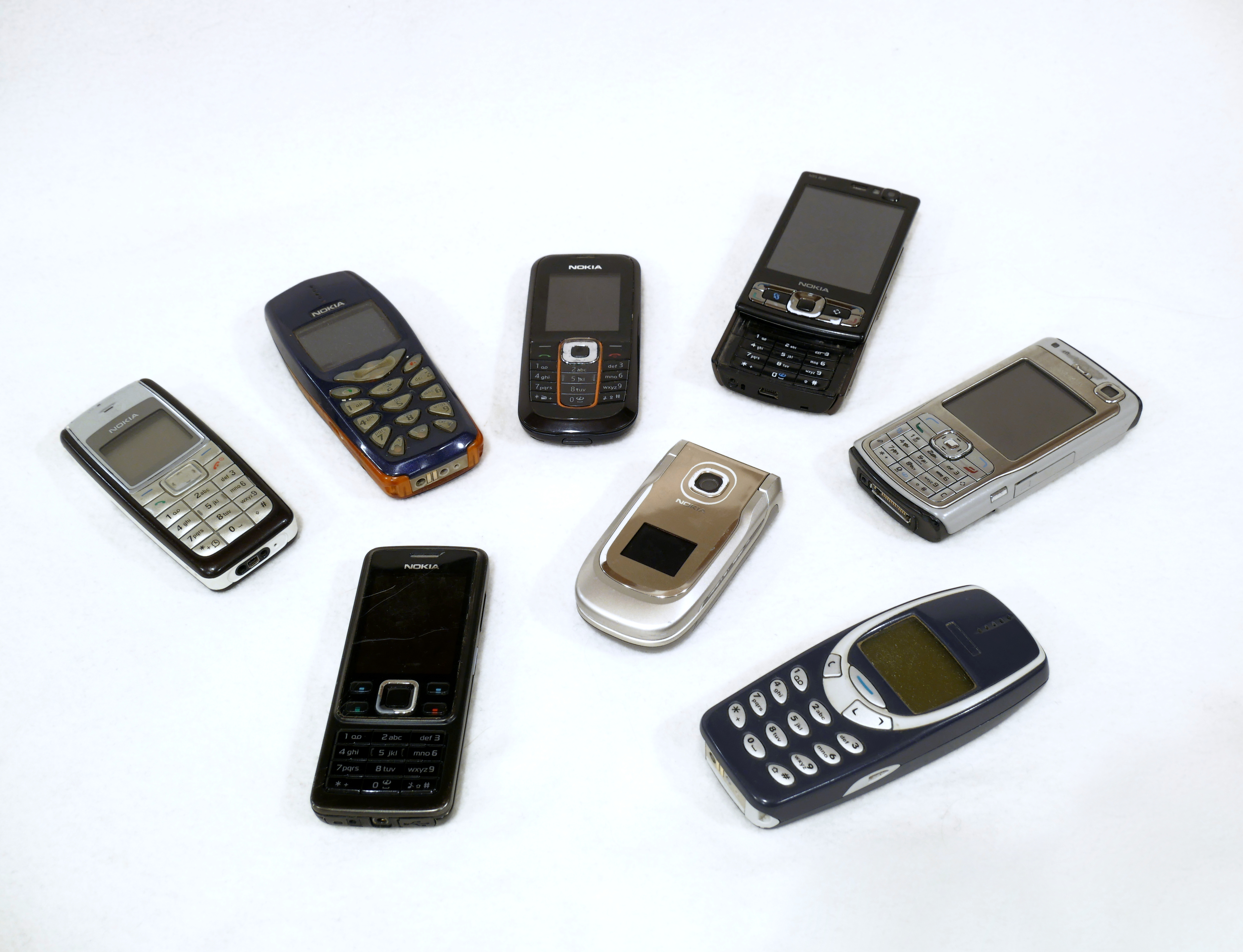
Various Nokia mobile phones from the 2000s

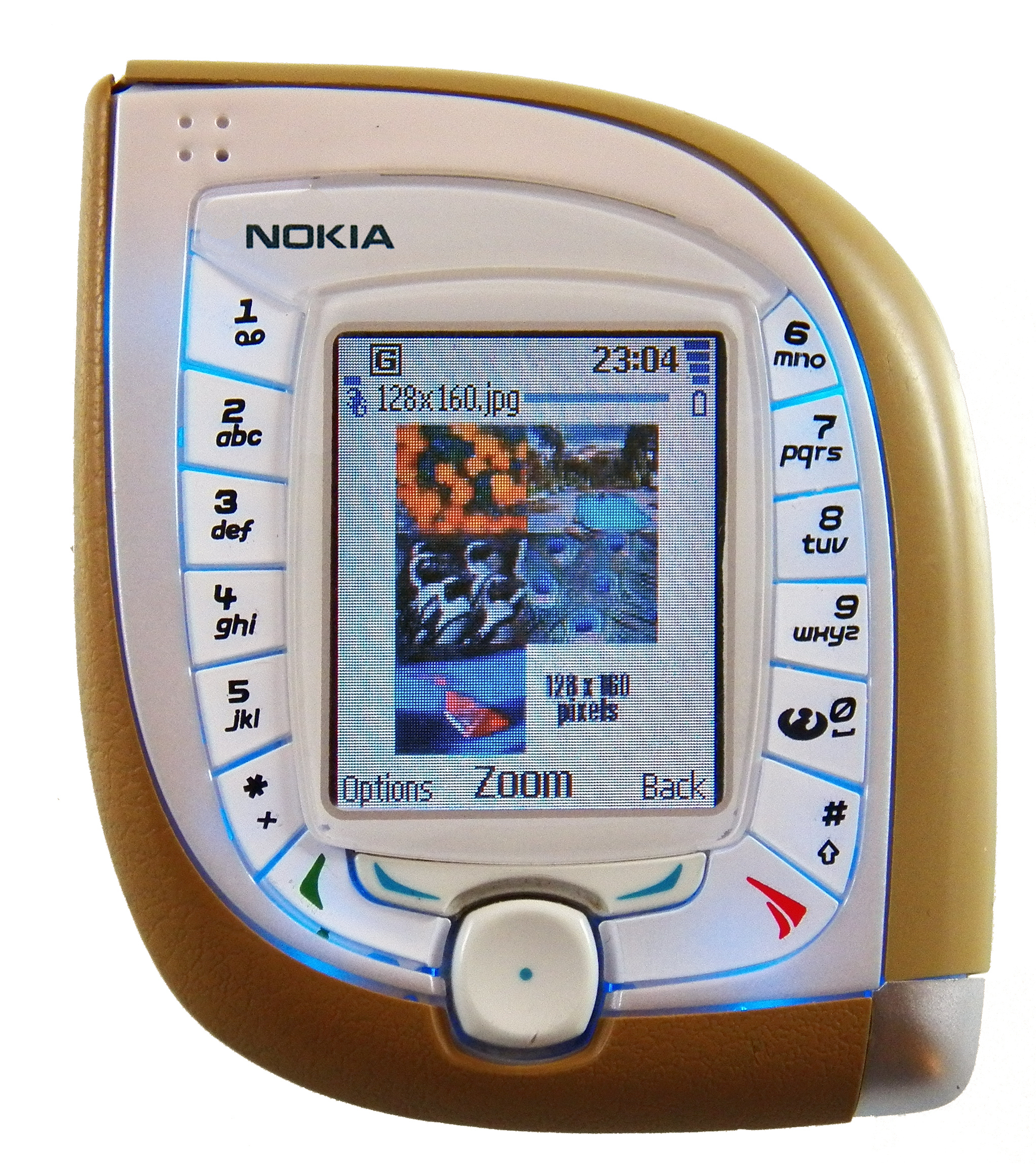
Nokia 7600 3G phone

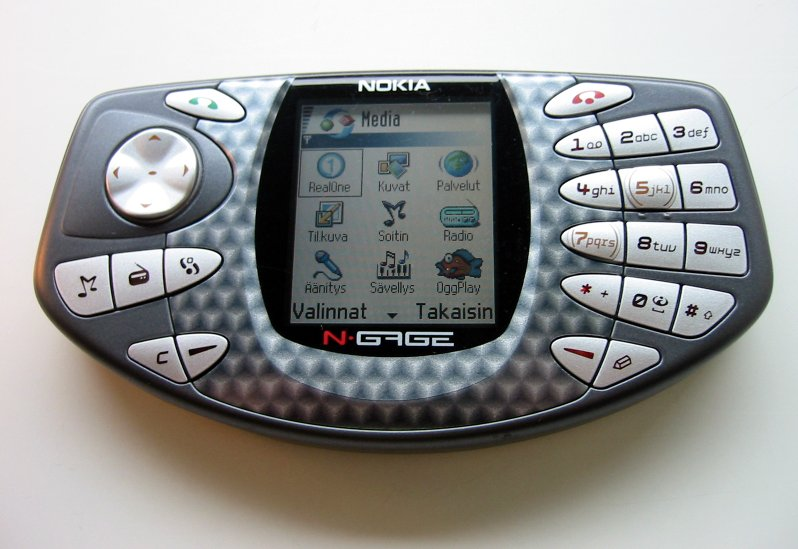
Nokia N-Gage

The company would then be known as a successful and innovative maker of camera phones. The Nokia 3600/3650 was the first camera phone on sale in North America in 2003. In April 2005, Nokia partnered with German camera optics maker Carl Zeiss AG. That same month, Nokia introduced the Nseries, which would become its flagship line of smartphones for the next six years. The Nokia N95 was introduced in September 2006, became highly successful, and was also awarded "best mobile imaging device" in Europe in 2007. Its successor the N82 featured a xenon flash, which helped it win the award of "best mobile imaging" device in Europe in 2008. The N93 in 2006 was known for its specialized camcorder and the twistable design that switches between clamshell and a camcorder-like position. They were also well known for the N8 with a high-resolution 12-megapixel sensor, in 2010; the 808 PureView with a 41-megapixel sensor, in 2012; and the Lumia 920 flagship, which implemented advanced PureView technologies, in 2012.

Nokia was one of the pioneers of mobile gaming due to the popularity of Snake, which came preloaded on many products. In 2002, Nokia attempted to break into the handheld gaming market with the N-Gage. Nokia's head of entertainment and media, Ilkka Raiskinen, once said, "Game Boy is for 10-year-olds", stating that N-Gage is more suited to a mature audience. However, the device was a failure, unable to challenge the dominant market leader, Nintendo. Nokia attempted to revive N-Gage as a platform for its S60 smartphones, which eventually launched in 2008.

In Q1 2004, Nokia's mobile phone handset market share steeply dropped to 28.9%, down from 34.6% a year earlier. However, by 2006, the company was steadily gaining again and in Q4 2007 reached its all-time high figure of 40.4%. Its smartphone market share in that quarter was 51%. Nokia was the largest vendor at the time in all regions bar North America.

Nokia launched mobile TV trials in 2005 in Finland with content provided by public broadcaster Yle. The services are based on the DVB-H standard. It could be viewed with the widescreen Nokia 7710 smartphone with a special accessory enabling it to receive DVB-H signals. Nokia partnered with Arqiva and O2 to launch trials in the UK in September 2005.

In 2005, Nokia developed a Linux-based operating system called Maemo, which shipped that year on the Nokia 770 Internet Tablet.

On 1 June 2006, Jorma Ollila became the company's chairman and retired as CEO, replaced by Olli-Pekka Kallasvuo.

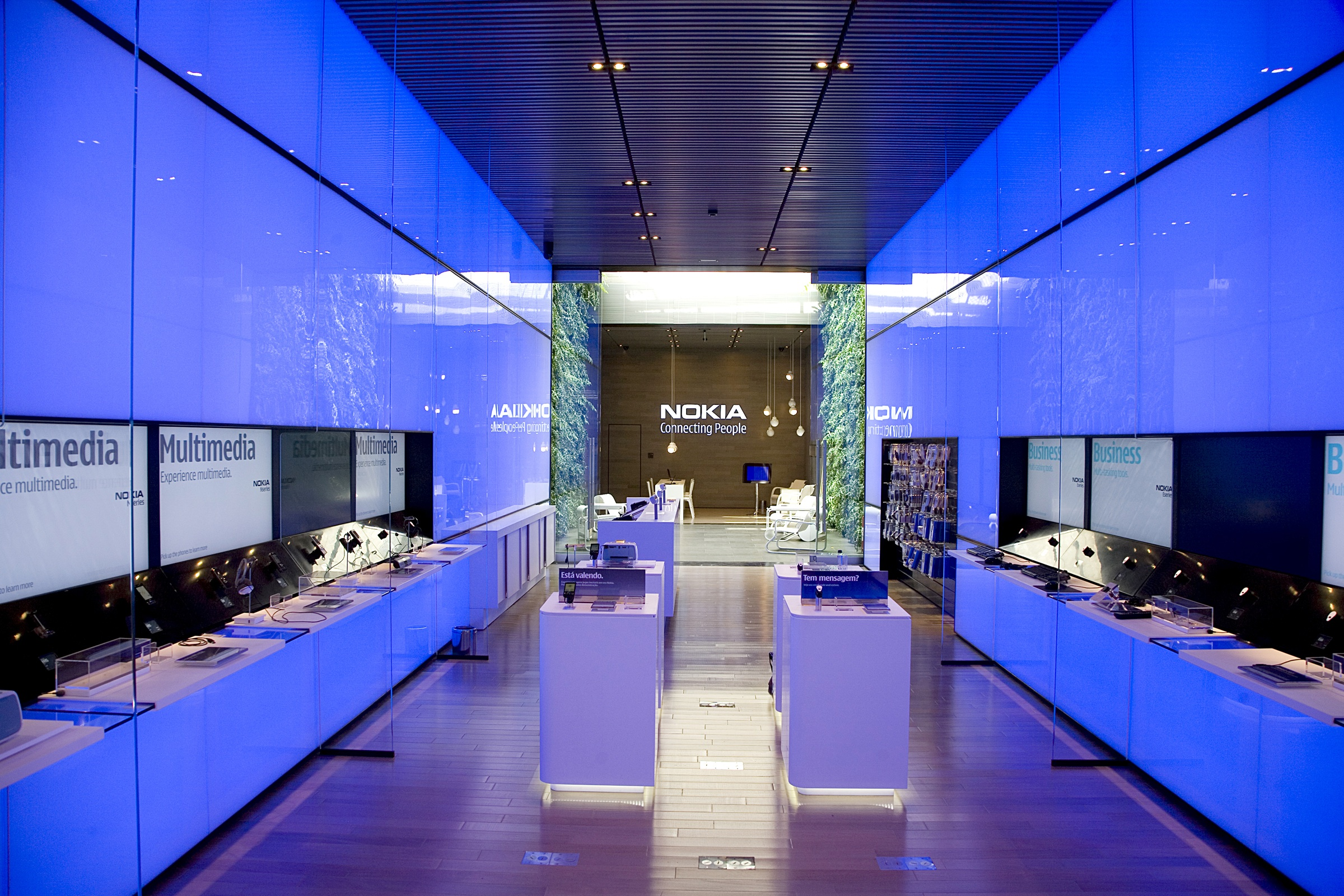
A flagship Nokia store in São Paulo, Brazil, in 2009

In August 2007, Nokia introduced Ovi, an umbrella name for the company's new Internet services, which included the N-Gage platform and the Nokia Music Store. The Ovi Store faced stiff competition from Apple's App Store when it was introduced in 2008.

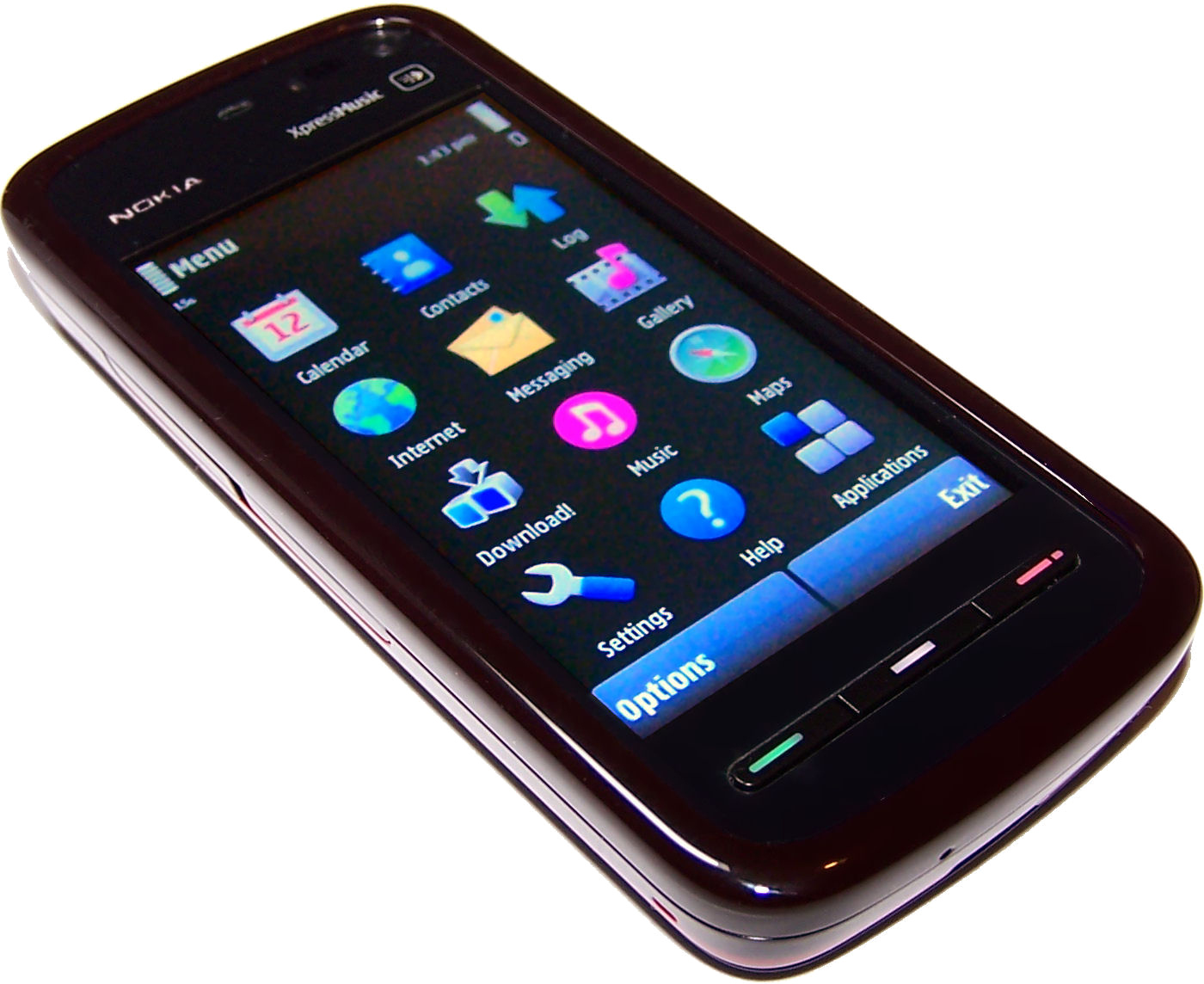
Nokia 5800 XpressMusic

In October 2008, Nokia announced the Nokia 5800 XpressMusic, the first device to ship with the new touch-centric S60 5th Edition, also known as Symbian^1, the first iteration of the platform since the creation of the Symbian Foundation. In November 2008, Nokia announced it would end mobile phone sales in Japan because of low market share. Nokia's global mobile phone market share peaked in 2008 at 38.6 percent. The same year, Nokia announced the acquisition of Trolltech and its Qt software development. Qt was a central part of Nokia's strategy until 2011, and it was eventually sold in 2012.

Nokia briefly returned to the computer market with the Booklet 3G netbook in August 2009.

=== 2010–2014 ===
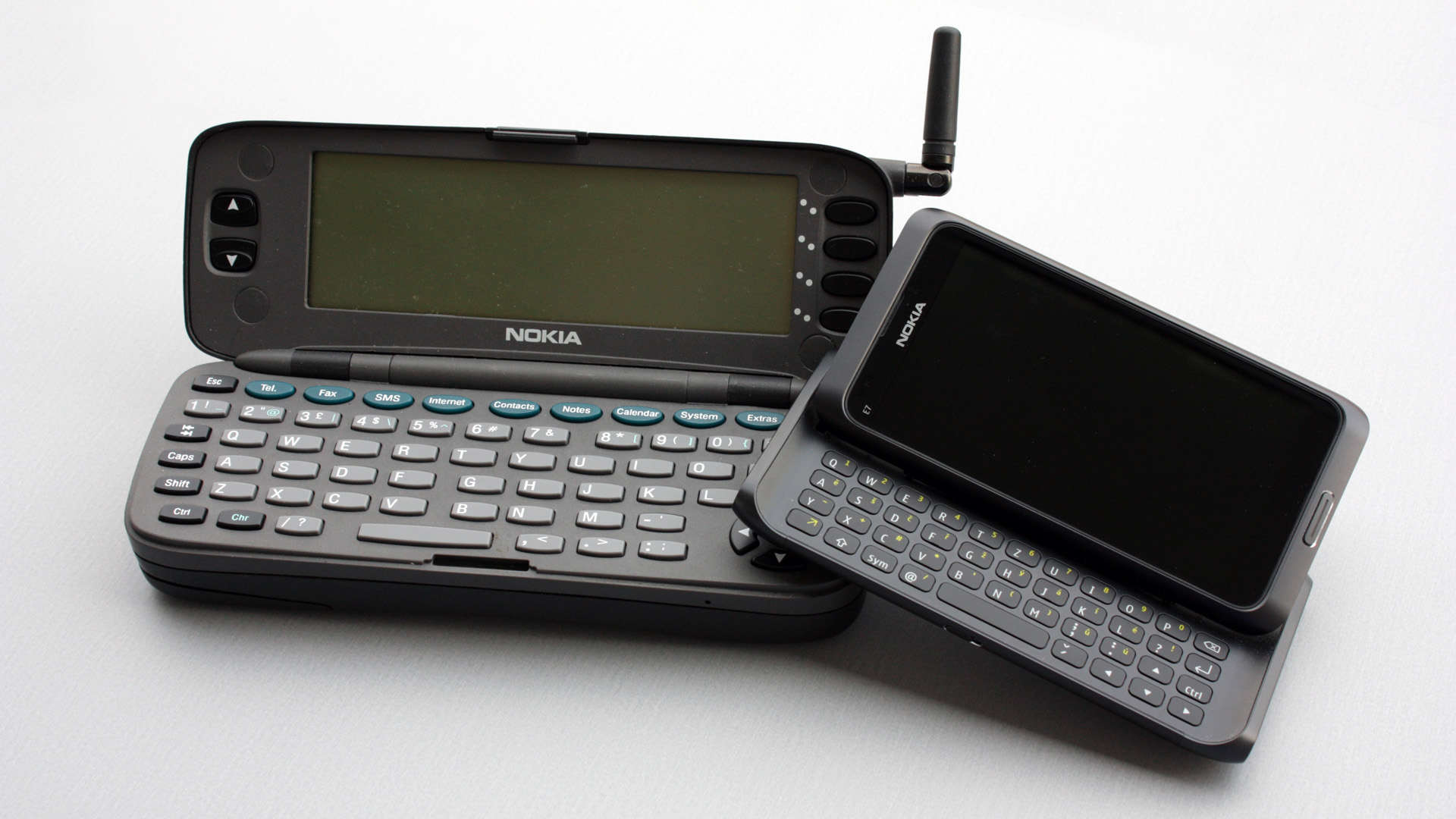
A Nokia 9000 Communicator (1996) next to a Nokia E7 Communicator (2011)

In late 2009 and in 2010, the music-focused Xseries and consumer-focused Cseries were introduced respectively. In April 2010, Nokia introduced its next flagship mobile device, the Nokia N8, which would be the first to run on Symbian^3. However, it was delayed for many months which tarnished the company's image, especially after the failure of its previous flagship N97 and tougher competition from Apple and the rising Google. On 10 September 2010, Olli-Pekka Kallasvuo was fired as CEO and it was announced that Stephen Elop from Microsoft would take Nokia's CEO position, becoming the first non-Finnish director in Nokia's history. It was claimed that investors pressed Nokia's board to recruit an outsider to shake up management and break from the traditional "Nokia way". Ollila had also announced that he would step down as Nokia chairman by 2012. On 11 March 2011, Nokia announced that it had paid Elop a $6 million signing bonus as "compensation for lost income from his prior employer", on top of his $1.4 million annual salary.

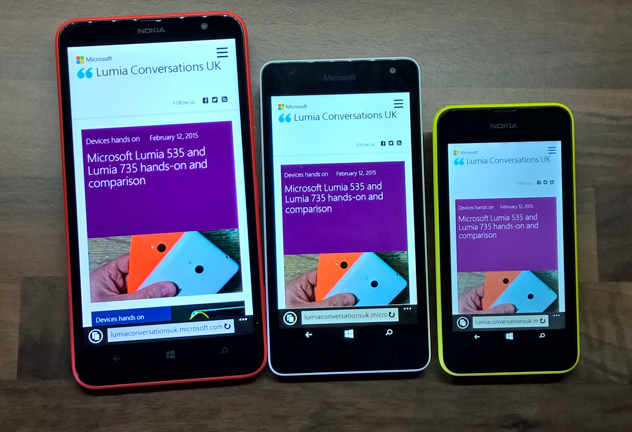
Nokia and Microsoft Lumia devices

The old Symbian OS became completely open-source in February 2010. However, in November 2010 it was announced that the Symbian Foundation was closing and that Nokia would take back control of the Symbian operating system under closed licensing. By now, Nokia was the only remaining company using the platform, along with carrier NTT Docomo in Japan, after both Samsung and Sony Ericsson moved to Android. Meanwhile, in 2010 for Nokia's Linux ambitions, Nokia collaborated with Intel to form the MeeGo project, after the merger of Nokia's own Maemo and Intel's Moblin.

Nokia's Symbian platform that had been the leading smartphone platform in Europe and Asia for many years was quickly becoming outdated and difficult for developers after the advent of iOS and Android. To counter this, Nokia planned to make its MeeGo Linux operating system, under development, the company's flagship on smartphones. Shortly after Elop's CEO tenure began, the Nokia board green-lit him the ability to change the company's mobile phones strategy, including changing operating systems. Veteran Anssi Vanjoki, head of the smartphones division, left the company around this time. His final appearance was at Nokia World 2010 when the Nokia E7-00 and other Symbian^3 devices were introduced.

On 11 February 2011, Nokia announced a "strategic partnership" with Microsoft, under which it would adopt Windows Phone 7 as its primary operating system on smartphones, and integrate its services and platforms with its own, including Bing as its default search engine, and integration of Nokia Maps data into Bing Maps. Elop stated that Nokia chose not to use Android because of an apparent inability to "differentiate" its offerings, with critics also noting that his past ties to Microsoft may have also influenced the decision. Although the MeeGo "Harmattan"-based N9 was met with a highly positive reception in 2011, Nokia had already decided to end development on MeeGo and solely focus on its Microsoft partnership, although the CEO said that the N9's "innovations" will live on in the future, which eventually made their way on the Asha platform in 2013. After the announcement of the Microsoft partnership, Nokia's market share deteriorated; this was due to demand for Symbian dropping when consumers realized Nokia's focus and attention would be elsewhere.

The company posted a large loss for the second quarter of 2011 – only its second quarterly loss in 19 years. Nokia's first Windows Phone flagship was the Lumia 800, which arrived in November 2011. Falling sales in 2011, which were not being improved significantly with the Lumia line in 2012, led to consecutive quarters of huge losses. By mid-2012 the company's stock price fell below $2. CEO Elop announced cost-cutting measures in June by shedding 10,000 employees by the end of the year and the closure of the Salo manufacturing plant. The Finnish prime minister also announced that the government wouldn't subsidize the company from an emergency state fund. Around this time, Nokia started a new project codenamed "Meltemi", a platform for low-end smartphones. With the Microsoft alliance and under Elop's management, Nokia also had a renewed focus on the North American market where Nokia phones were, in stark contrast to the rest of the world, almost irrelevant for many years. This strategy began in January 2012 with the introduction of the Nokia Lumia 900 smartphone in partnership with U.S. carrier AT&T.

In March 2011, Nokia introduced a new corporate typeface called "Nokia Pure". On 1 August 2011, Nokia announced that it would adopt a new three-digit naming system for mobile phone products and stop using letters, effectively ending the Nseries, Eseries, and short-lived Cseries. That same day, the Nokia 500 was introduced with the new system. Nokia last used three-digit names on analogue phones in the 1990s.

When the Lumia 920 was announced in September 2012, it was seen by the press as the first high-end Windows Phone that could challenge rivals due to its advanced feature set. Elop said that the positive reaction to it had created a sense of hope and optimism in the company. The company was also making gains in developing countries with its Asha series, which were selling strongly. Although Nokia's smartphone sales and market share greatly increased throughout 2013, including in the North American market, it was still not enough to avoid financial losses. Ollila stepped down as chairman on 4 May 2012 and was replaced by Risto Siilasmaa.

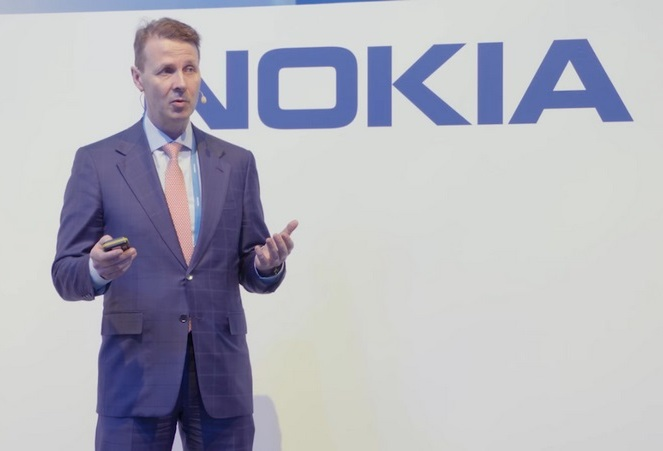
Risto Siilasmaa, Nokia chairperson from 2012 to 2020

In September 2013, Nokia announced the sale of its mobile and devices division to Microsoft. The sale was positive for Nokia to avoid further negative financial figures, as well as for Microsoft's CEO Steve Ballmer, who wanted Microsoft to produce more hardware and turn it into a devices and services company. The Nokia chairperson, Risto Siilasmaa, described the deal as rationally correct (in the best interests of Nokia shareholders), but emotionally difficult – experts agree that Nokia would have been in a cash crisis had it not sold the division to Microsoft. Analysts believe that Ballmer pushed for the buyout because of fears that Nokia was close to adopting Android and abandoning their alliance with Microsoft. Indeed, in January 2014 the Nokia X was introduced which ran on a customised version of Android. It was a surprising and somewhat odd launch coming just weeks away from the finalization of the Microsoft buyout. Others, including Ballmer's successor Satya Nadella, felt that Microsoft thought merging its software teams with Nokia's hardware engineering and designs would "accelerate" growth of Windows Phone. The sale was completed in April 2014, with Microsoft Mobile becoming the successor to Nokia's mobile devices division. Nokia also moved from its headquarters to another building complex located at Karaportti. At the time, Ballmer himself was retiring as Microsoft CEO and was replaced by Satya Nadella, who opposed the Nokia mobile phones purchase, along with chairman Bill Gates. The purchased assets from Nokia were eventually written-off by Microsoft in 2015.

By 2014, Nokia's global brand value according to Interbrand fell to 98th place, a sharp slide from the 5th place it was in 2009. Nokia's downfall in the mobile phone market has had different explanations from analysts, with many split about the CEO's decision to abandon its in-house operating system and adopting Windows Phone in 2011. Many researchers have concluded that Nokia suffered from deep internal rivalries within the management. Former employees claimed that the management became so swollen by the early success that it grew complacent over time. Some from the Symbian developing team have claimed that the company's upper management rejected hundreds of potential innovations during the 2000s that it proposed, including entirely rewriting Symbian's code. One former Nokia employee claimed that the company was run as a "Soviet-style bureaucracy".

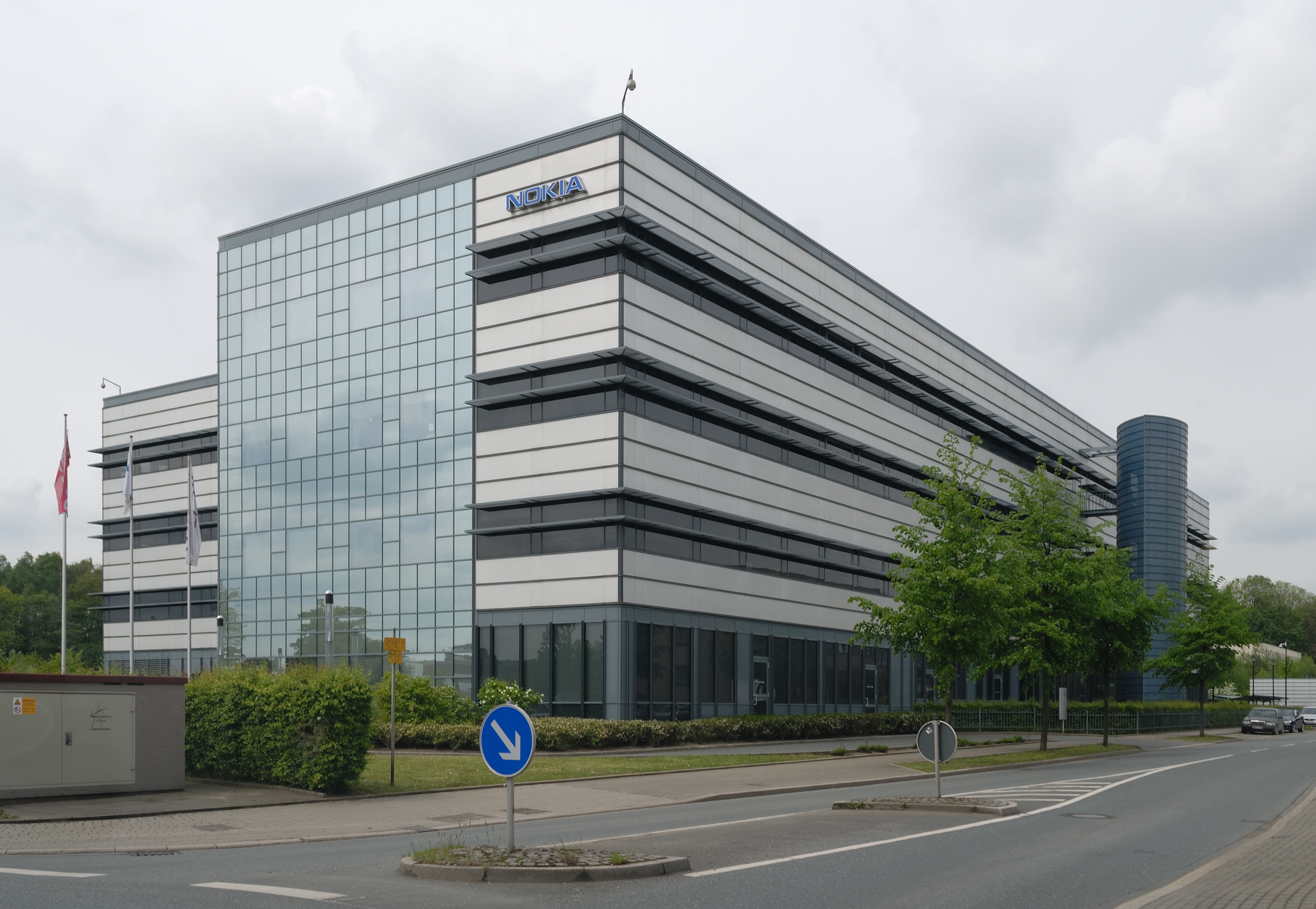
Former Nokia plant in Bochum, Germany

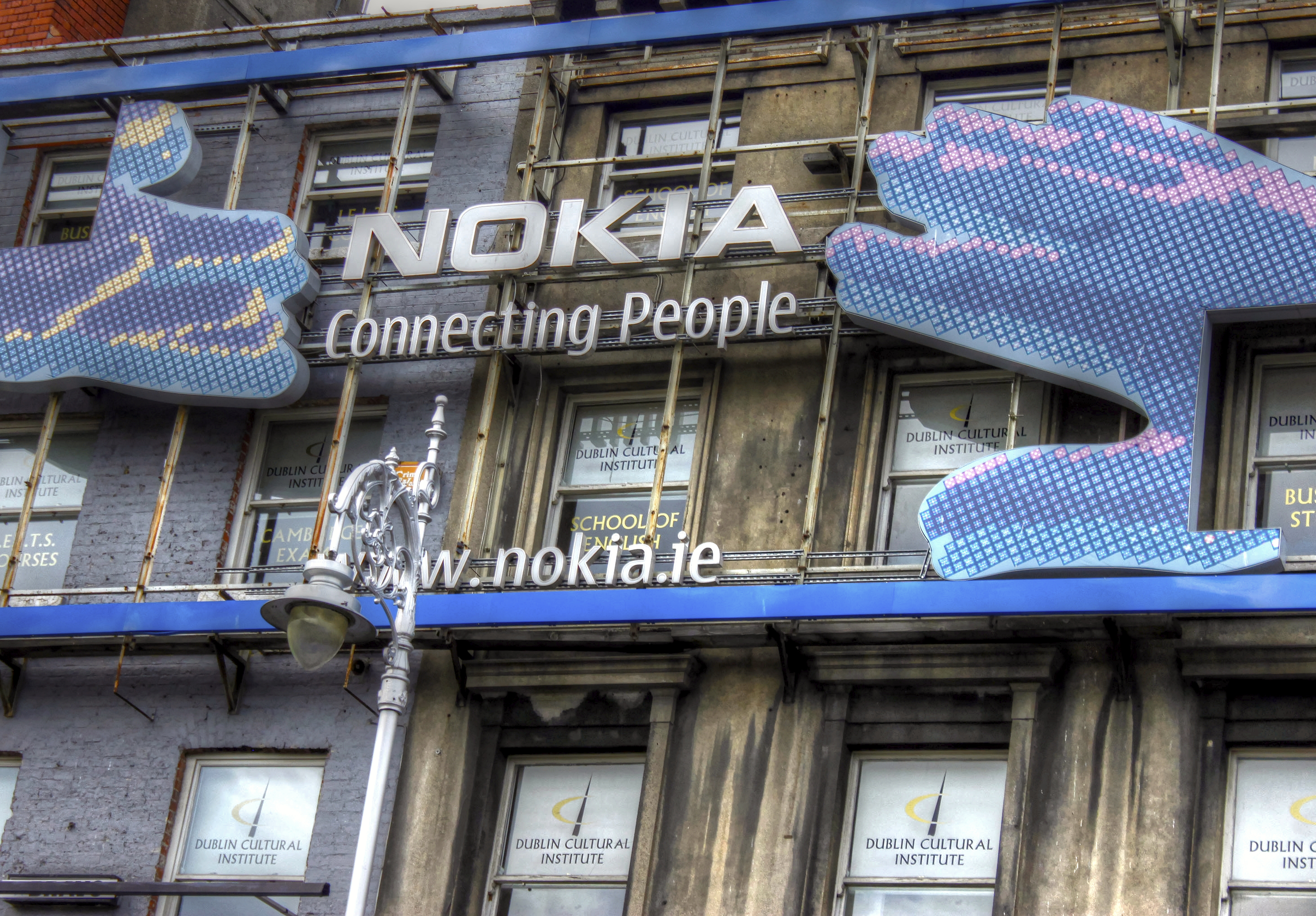
A Nokia advertising sign in Dublin, Ireland

In July 2013, Nokia bought Siemens' stake in the Nokia Siemens Networks joint venture for $2.2 billion, turning it into a wholly owned subsidiary called Nokia Solutions and Networks, until being rebranded as Nokia Networks soon after. During Nokia's financial struggles, its profitable networking division with Siemens provided much of its income; thus, the purchase proved to be positive, particularly after the sale of its mobile devices unit.

=== 2014–2016 ===
After the sale of its mobile devices division, Nokia focused on network equipment through Nokia Networks.

In October 2014, Nokia and China Mobile signed a US$970 million framework deal for delivery between 2014 and 2015.

On 17 November 2014, Nokia Technologies head Ramzi Haidamus disclosed that the company planned to re-enter the consumer electronics business as an original design manufacturer, licensing in-house hardware designs and technologies to third-party manufacturers. Haidamus stated that the Nokia brand was "valuable" but "is diminishing in value, and that's why it is important that we reverse that trend very quickly, imminently". The next day, Nokia unveiled the N1, an Android tablet manufactured by Foxconn, as its first product following the Microsoft sale. Haidamus emphasized that devices released under these licensing agreements would be held to high standards in production quality, and would "look and feel just like Nokia built it". Nokia CEO Rajeev Suri stated that the company planned to re-enter the mobile phone business in this manner in 2016, following the expiration of its non-compete clause with Microsoft.

According to Robert Morlino, the spokesman of Nokia Technologies, Nokia planned to follow the brand-licensing model rather than direct marketing of mobile devices due to the sale of its mobile devices division to Microsoft. The company took aggressive steps to revitalize itself, evident through its hiring of software experts, testing of new products and seeking of sales partners. On 14 July 2015, CEO Rajeev Suri confirmed that the company would make a return to the mobile phones market in 2016.

On 28 July 2015, Nokia announced OZO, a 360-degrees virtual reality camera, with eight 2K optical image sensors. The division behind the product, Nokia Technologies, claimed that OZO would be the most advanced VR film-making platform. Nokia's press release stated that OZO would be "the first in a planned portfolio of digital media solutions," with more technological products expected in the future. OZO was fully unveiled on 30 November in Los Angeles. The OZO, designed for professional use, was intended for retail for US$60,000; however, its price was decreased by $15,000 prior to release, and is listed on its official website as $40,000.

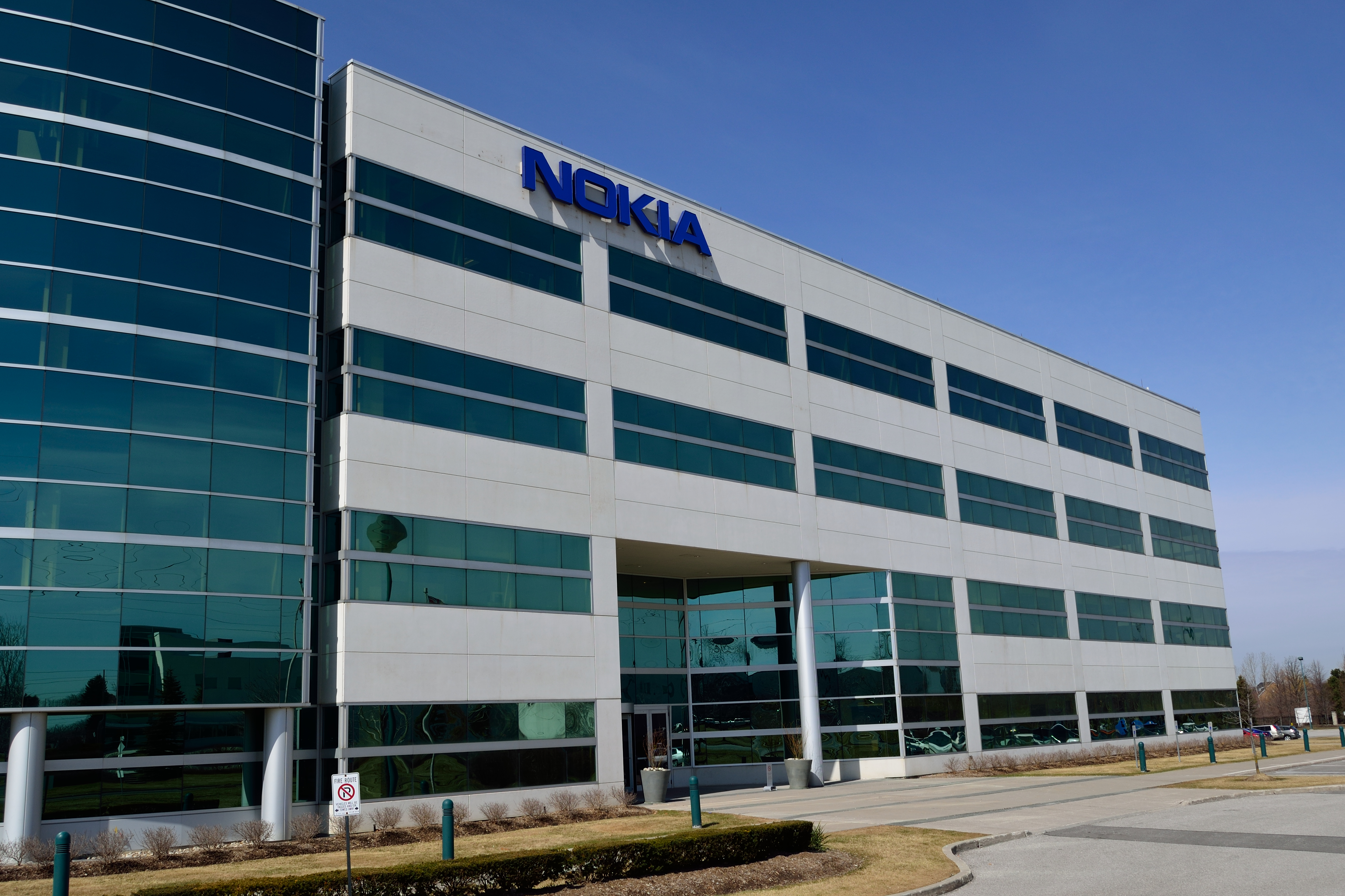
Nokia office building in Markham, Ontario, Canada in 2016 – originally Alcatel-Lucent's office

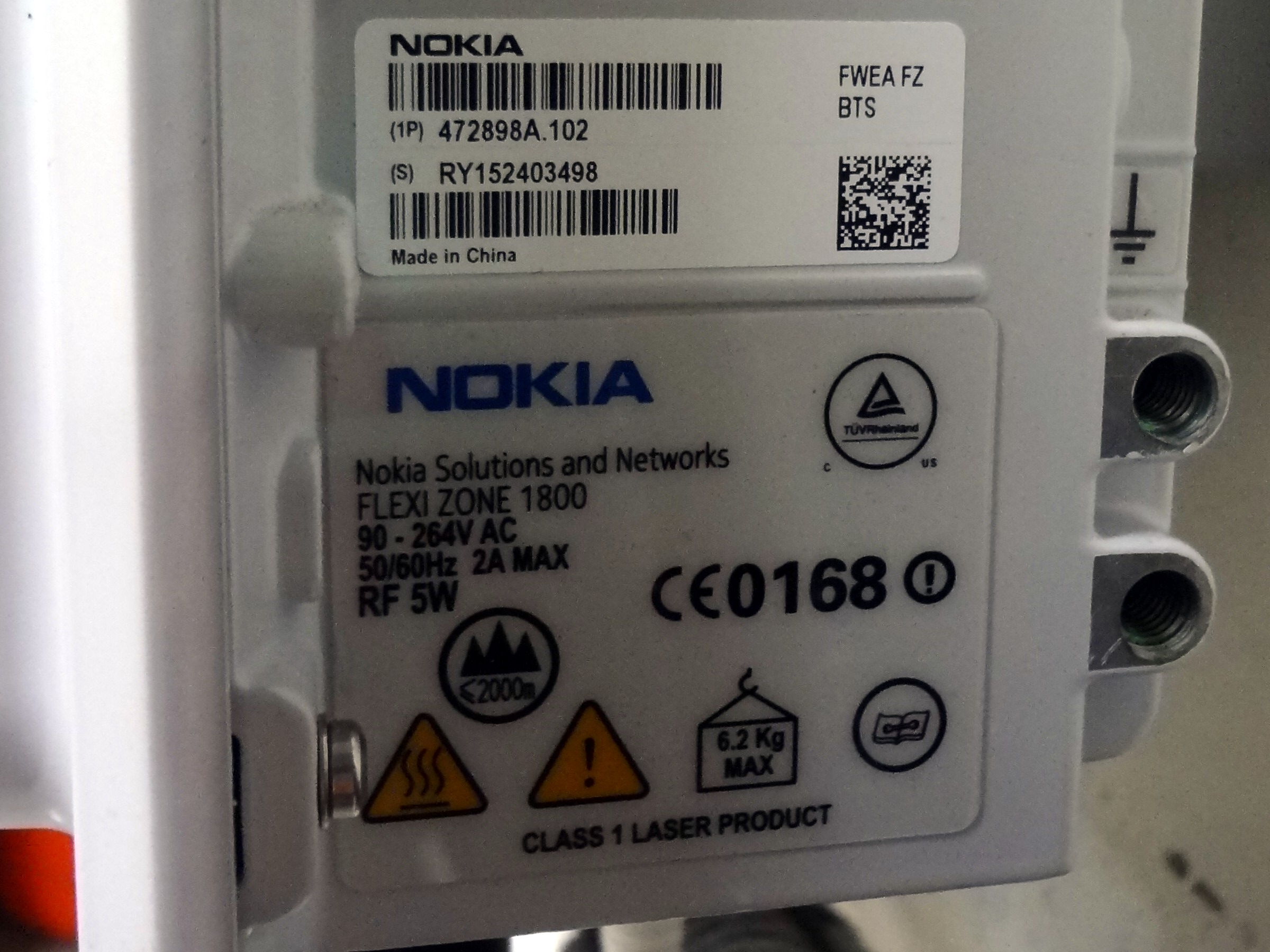
A Nokia Flexi Zone base transceiver station (2015)

On 14 April 2015, Nokia confirmed that it was in talks with the French telecommunications equipment company Alcatel-Lucent regarding a potential merger. The next day, Nokia announced that it had agreed to purchase Alcatel-Lucent for €15.6 billion in an all-stock deal. CEO Rajeev Suri felt that the purchase would give Nokia a strategic advantage in the development of 5G wireless technologies. The acquisition created a stronger competitor to the rival firms Ericsson and Huawei, whom Nokia and Alcatel-Lucent had surpassed in terms of total combined revenue in 2014. Nokia shareholders hold 66.5% of the new combined company, while Alcatel-Lucent shareholders hold 33.5%. The Bell Labs division was to be maintained, but the Alcatel-Lucent brand would be replaced by Nokia. In October 2015, following approval of the deal by China's Ministry of Commerce, the merger awaited approval by French regulators. Despite the initial intent of selling the submarine cable division separately, Alcatel-Lucent later declared that it would not. The merger closed on 14 January 2016, but was not complete until 3 November 2016. From the acquisition, Nokia is now also the owner of the Alcatel Mobile phone brand, which continues to be licensed to TCL.

On 3 August 2015, Nokia announced that it had reached a deal to sell its Here digital maps division to a consortium of BMW, Daimler AG and Volkswagen Group for €2.8 billion. The deal closed on 3 December 2015.

=== 2016–2019 ===
On 26 April 2016, Nokia announced its intent to acquire French connected health device maker Withings for US$191 million. The company was integrated into a new Digital Health unit of Nokia Technologies. Nokia later wrote off the cost of the acquisition and in May 2018 the health unit was sold back to Éric Carreel, a Withings co-founder and former CEO.

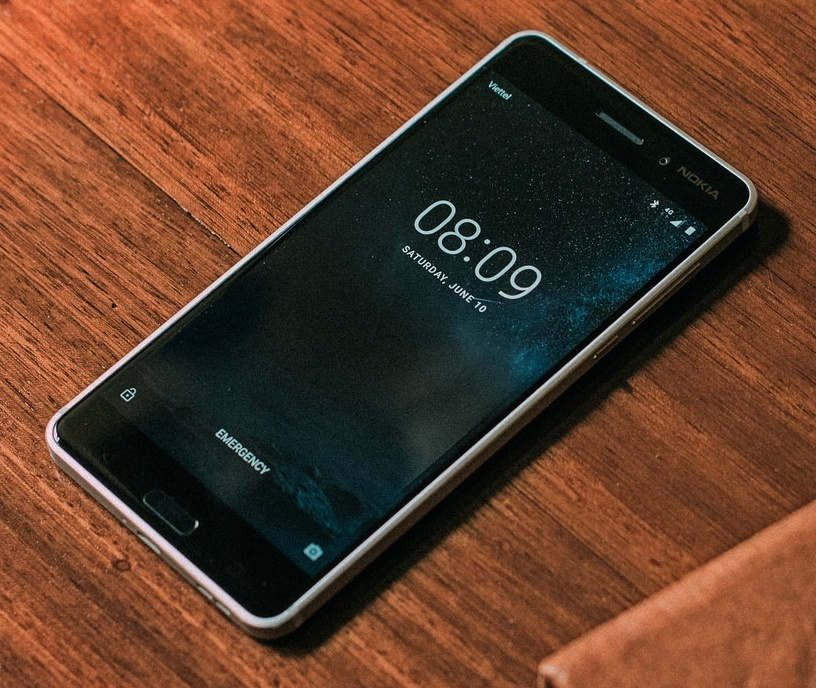
2017 Nokia 6

On 18 May 2016, Microsoft Mobile sold its Nokia-branded feature phone business to HMD Global, a new company founded by former Nokia executive Jean-Francois Baril, and an associated factory in Vietnam to Foxconn's FIH Mobile subsidiary. Nokia subsequently entered into a long-term licensing deal to make HMD the exclusive manufacturer of Nokia-branded phones and tablets outside Japan, operating in conjunction with Foxconn. The deal also granted HMD the right to essential patents and featurephone software. HMD subsequently announced the Android-based Nokia 6 smartphone in January 2017. At Mobile World Congress, HMD additionally unveiled the Nokia 3 and Nokia 5 smartphones, as well as a re-imagining of Nokia's classic 3310 feature phone. Nokia has direct investments in the company, and it does have some input in the new devices.

On 28 June 2016, Nokia demonstrated for the first time a 5G-ready network. In February 2017 Nokia carried out a 5G connection in Oulu, Finland using the 5GTF standard, backed by Verizon, on Intel architecture-based equipment.

In July 2017, Nokia and Xiaomi announced that they have signed a business collaboration agreement and a multi-year patent agreement, including a cross-license to each company's cellular standard-essential patents. In that year, Nokia's brand value was ranked 188th by Brand Finance, a jump of 147 places from 2016. Its rise was attributed to its health portfolio and new mobile phones developed by HMD Global.

In January 2018, Nokia signed a deal with NTT Docomo, Japan's largest mobile operator, to provide 5G wireless radio base stations in the country by 2020. Later that month, Nokia announced the ReefShark line of 5G chipsets, claiming that it triples bandwidth to 84 Gbit/s. In March, Solidium, the investment arm of the Finnish Government, purchased a 3.3% stake in Nokia valued at €844 million. In May, Nokia announced that it had acquired a California-based IoT startup, SpaceTime Insight.

In January 2019, the Canadian government announced that it would provide $40 million to support Nokia's research on 5G technology. A 2019 study revealed that Nokia phones performed far better than rivals Samsung, LG, Xiaomi, and Huawei in updating to the latest version of Android. The study, made by Counterpoint Research, found that 96 percent of Nokia phones were either sent with or updated to the latest Android version since Pie was released in 2018. Nokia's competitors were found to be all around roughly the 80 percent range.

=== 2020–present ===
On 2 March 2020, Nokia announced Pekka Lundmark as its new CEO. Later that month, Nokia completed the acquisition of Elenion Technologies, a U.S.-based company focusing on silicon photonics technology to improve economics of advanced optical connectivity products.

On 27 May 2020, Sari Baldauf succeeded Risto Siilasmaa as chairwoman of the board of directors, and Kari Stadigh was appointed vice chair. In June, Nokia won a 5G contract worth approximately $450 million from Taiwan Mobile to build out the telecom operator's next-generation network as the sole supplier. In October, Nokia announced a contract with NASA to build a 4G mobile network for astronaut usage on the moon. The $14.1 million contract, through subsidiary Bell Labs, was expected to begin in 2022.

In 2020, Flipkart collaborated with Nokia to market Nokia-branded consumer products in India. These included televisions, a laptop and a range of air conditioners.

In April 2022, Nokia announced that it would exit the Russian market following the 2022 Russian invasion of Ukraine. The company stated that the decision would not affect its financial outlook as Russia accounted for less than 2% of Nokia's net sales in 2021.

In February 2023, the company introduced a new logo for the first time in nearly 60 years to change its brand identity as people still associated the previous logo with mobile phones. The new logo was designed by Lippincott.

In December 2023, Nokia acquired Fenix Group to strengthen its wireless offering in the defense segment for an undisclosed amount. In the same month, Nokia announced a €185 million deal with Lumine Group to carve out its device management business (inherited from Alcatel-Lucent's purchase of Motive, Inc.) and its service management business (formerly Mformation). The deal completed in April 2024 and involved the transfer of around 500 Nokia employees.

In February 2024, the company announced that it was accelerating its carbon neutrality target by 10 years to 2040 after having previously committed to cutting its carbon footprint across emissions scopes in half by 2030 from a 2019 baseline.

In June 2024, Nokia acquired Infinera for $2.3 billion.

On 10 February 2025, Nokia announced that Pekka Lundmark would step down as president and CEO on 31 March and be succeeded by Justin Hotard.

In September 2025, Nokia announced an artificial intelligence-based partnership with Supermicro, focusing on integrated data center network products.

A partnership with Nvidia was established in October 2025 to collaborate in the areas of AI-RAN, 5G-Advanced, and 6G, with Nvidia also acquiring a stake in Nokia.

Nokia's stock reached a 16-year high in May 2026, though it remained well below the peak reached in the 2000s. The stock price was driven by booming business in artificial intelligence infrastructure. Revenue from AI and cloud customers rose by nearly 50 percent in the first quarter of 2026.

On July 23, 2026, Nokia announced the lease of the NXP fabrication facility at 1300 N. Alma School Road, Chandler, Arizona. Nokia plans in 2027, for indium phosphide semiconductor production for their optical components. Future expansion to acquire the facility for 2029 production.

== Current operations ==
Nokia is a julkinen osakeyhtiö (public joint-stock company) listed on the Nasdaq Nordic/Helsinki and New York stock exchanges. Nokia has played a very large role in the economy of Finland, and it is an important employer in the country, working with multiple local partners and subcontractors. Nokia contributed 1.6% to Finland's GDP and accounted for about 16% of the country's exports in 2006.

Nokia comprises two business groups along with further subsidiaries and affiliated firms.

=== Nokia Networks ===
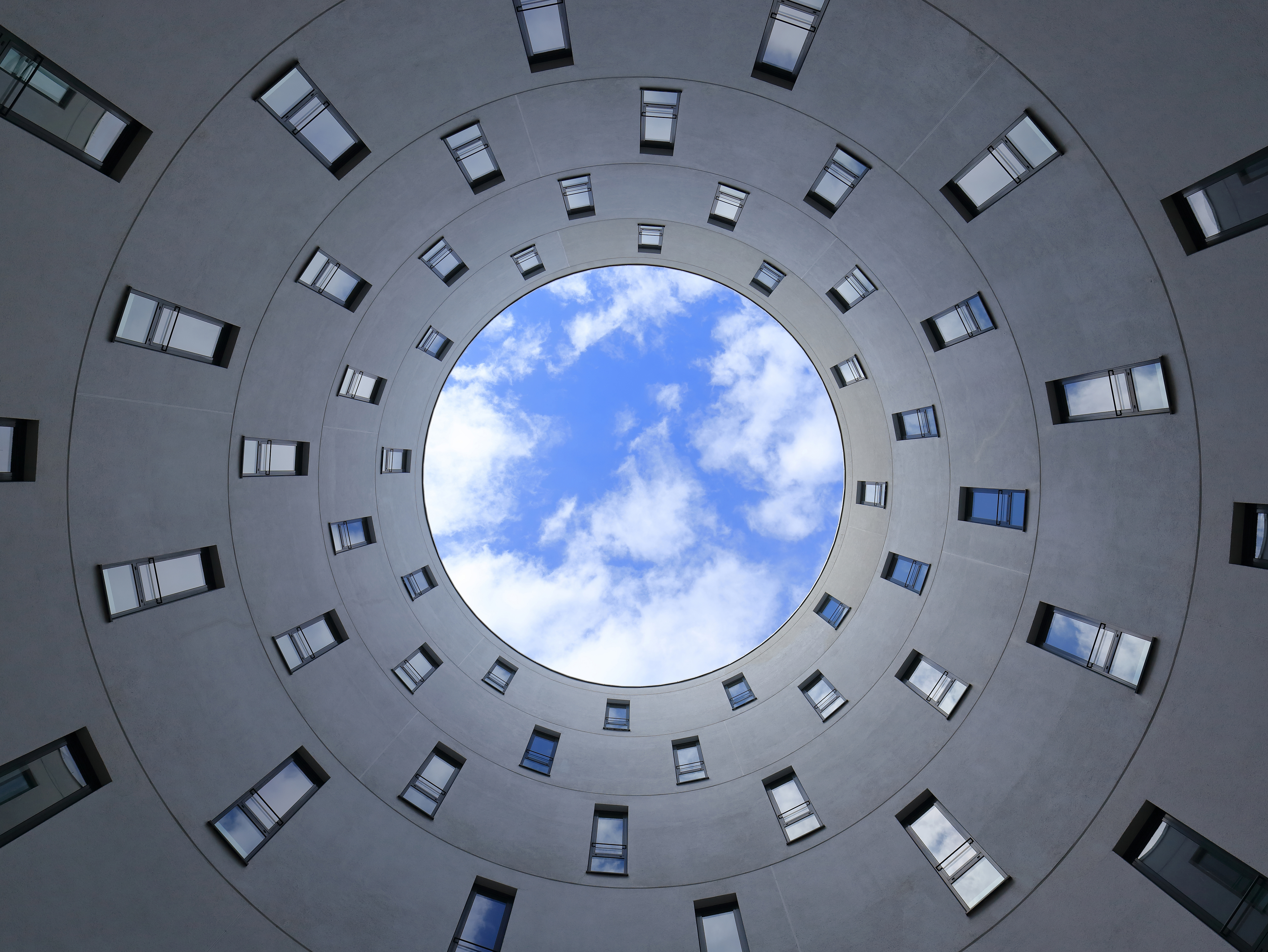
Inside the Nokia Networks office in Munich, Germany

Nokia Networks is Nokia Corporation's largest division. It is a multinational data networking and telecommunications equipment company headquartered in Espoo, Finland, and is the world's third-largest telecoms equipment manufacturer, measured by 2017 revenues (after Huawei and Cisco). In the USA it competes with Ericsson on building 5G networks for operators, while Huawei Technologies and ZTE Corporation were effectively banned.

It has operations in around 150 countries.

Nokia Networks provides wireless and fixed network infrastructure, communications and networks service platforms and professional services to operators and service providers. It focuses on GSM, EDGE, 3G/W-CDMA, LTE and WiMAX radio access networks, supporting core networks with increasing IP and multiaccess capabilities and services.

The Nokia Siemens Networks (NSN) brand identity was launched at the 3GSM World Congress in Barcelona in February 2007 as a joint venture between Nokia (50.1%) and Siemens (49.9%), although it is now wholly owned by Nokia. In July 2013, Nokia bought back all shares in Nokia Siemens Networks for a sum of US$2.21 billion and renamed it to Nokia Solutions and Networks, shortly thereafter changed to simply Nokia Networks.

=== Nokia Technologies ===
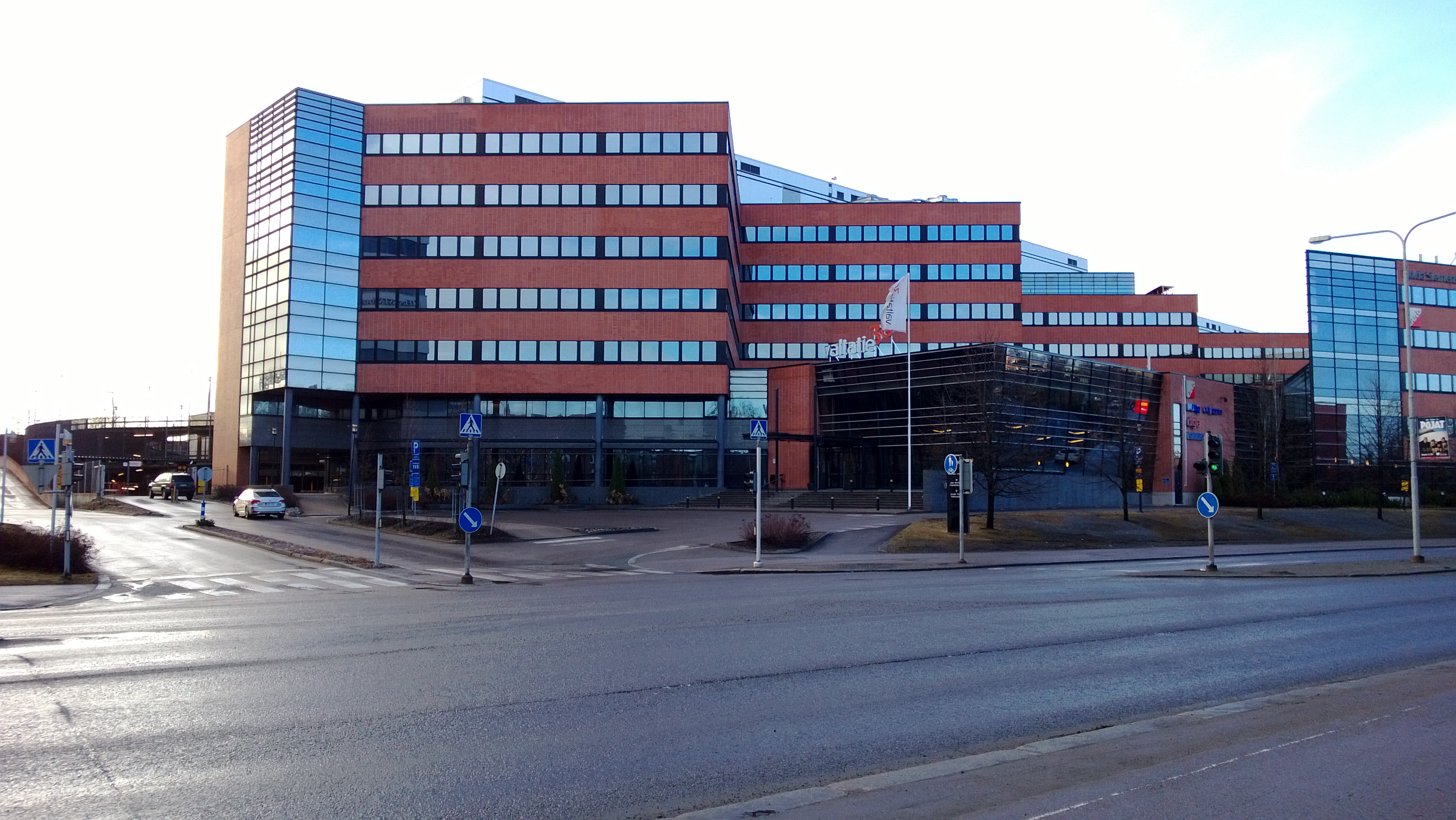
Nokia office building in Tampere, Finland

Nokia Technologies (formerly Nokia Advanced Technologies) is a division of Nokia that develops consumer products and licenses technology including the Nokia brand. Its focuses are imaging, sensing, wireless connectivity, power management and materials, and other areas such as the IP licensing and patenting program. It consists of three labs: Radio Systems Lab, in areas of radio access, wireless local connectivity and radio implementation; Media Technologies Lab, in areas of multimedia and interaction; and Sensor and Material Technologies Lab, in areas of advanced sensing solutions, interaction methods, nanotechnologies and quantum technologies. Nokia Technologies also provides public participation in its development through the Invent with Nokia program. It was created in 2014 following a restructuring of Nokia Corporation.

In November 2014, Nokia Technologies launched its first product, the Nokia N1 tablet computer. In July 2015, Nokia Technologies introduced a VR camera called OZO, designed for professional content creators and developed in Tampere, Finland. With its 8 synchronized shutter sensors and 8 microphones, the product can capture stereoscopic 3D video and spatial audio. Production of the OZO camera was discontinued in 2017, but the immersive audio software technologies continue under the Nokia OZO brand, still keeping Nokia in the virtual reality market.

On 31 August 2016, Ramzi Haidamus announced he would be stepping down from his position as president of Nokia Technologies. Brad Rodrigues, previously head of strategy and business development, assumed the role of interim president. On 30 June 2017, Gregory Lee, previously CEO of Samsung Electronics in North America, was appointed Nokia Technologies CEO and president.

=== Nokia Bell Labs ===
Nokia Bell Labs is a research and scientific development company that was once the R&D arm of the American Bell System. It became a subsidiary of Nokia Corporation after the takeover of Alcatel-Lucent in 2016.

In December 2023, Nokia announced plans for a new research facility in New Brunswick, New Jersey. The relocation from the 80-year-old Bell Labs facility at Murray Hill, New Jersey is expected to occur before 2028. The Murray Hill laboratories produced important innovations for AT&T Corp., Lucent Technologies, Alcatel-Lucent, and Nokia.

=== NGP Capital ===
NGP Capital (formerly Nokia Growth Partners) is a global venture capital firm, focusing on investments in the growth stage "Internet of things" (IoT) and mobile technology companies. NGP holds investments throughout the U.S., Europe, China and India. Their portfolio consists of companies in mobile technology including the sectors Connected Enterprise, Digital Health, Consumer IoT, and Connected Car. Following a $350 million funding for IoT companies in 2016, NGP manages $1 billion worth of assets.

Nokia had previously promoted innovation through venture sponsorships dating back to 1998 with Nokia Venture Partners, which was renamed BlueRun Ventures and spun off in 2005. The China arm of BlueRun Ventures became independent in 2010 and would be rebranded to Lanchi Ventures. Nokia Growth Partners (NGP) was founded in 2005 as a growth stage venture fund as a continuation of the early successes of Nokia Venture Partners. In 2017, the company was renamed to NGP Capital.

NGP's largest exits include GanJi, UCWeb, Whistle, Rocket Fuel, Swype, Summit Microelectronics and Netmagic.

=== Nuage Networks ===
Nuage Networks is a venture providing software-defined networking solutions. It was formed by Alcatel-Lucent in 2013 to develop a software overlay for automating and orchestrating hybrid clouds. It has been part of Nokia following its acquisition of Alcatel-Lucent in 2016. Throughout 2017 Nuage sealed deals with Vodafone and Telefónica to provide its SD-WAN architecture to its servers. BT had already been a client since 2016. A deal with China Mobile in January 2017 also used Nuage's software-defined networking technology for 2,000 public cloud servers at existing data centers in China, and another in October 2017 with China Pacific Insurance Company.

The company is based in Mountain View, California and the CEO is Sunil Khandekar.

=== Alcatel Mobile ===
Alcatel Mobile is a mobile phone brand owned by Nokia since 2016. It has been licensed since 2005 to Chinese company TCL when it was under the ownership of Alcatel (later Alcatel-Lucent) in a contract until 2024.

=== HMD Global ===
HMD Global is a mobile phone company based in Espoo, Finland. The Nokia brand has been licensed by former Nokia employees who founded HMD Global and introduced Nokia-branded Android-based devices to the market in 2017. Initially, Nokia had no investment in the company but retained some input in the development of its devices.

Nokia has 10.10% ownership in HMD Global after investing alongside Qualcomm and Google in 2020. In the 2020 financial report, FIH Mobile disclosed it has a 14.38% ownership in HMD Global. Finnish Nokia owns 10.10% of HMD Global, while other investors include Google, Qualcomm, and others with an undisclosed share in HMD.

=== Alcatel Submarine Networks ===
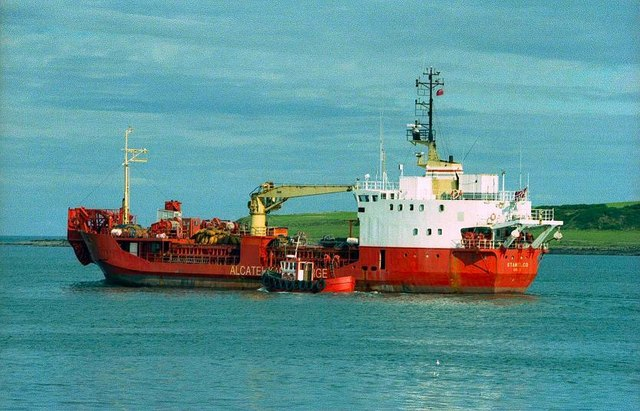
Cable ship Stanelco in 1975 with Alcatel acquisition in 2000

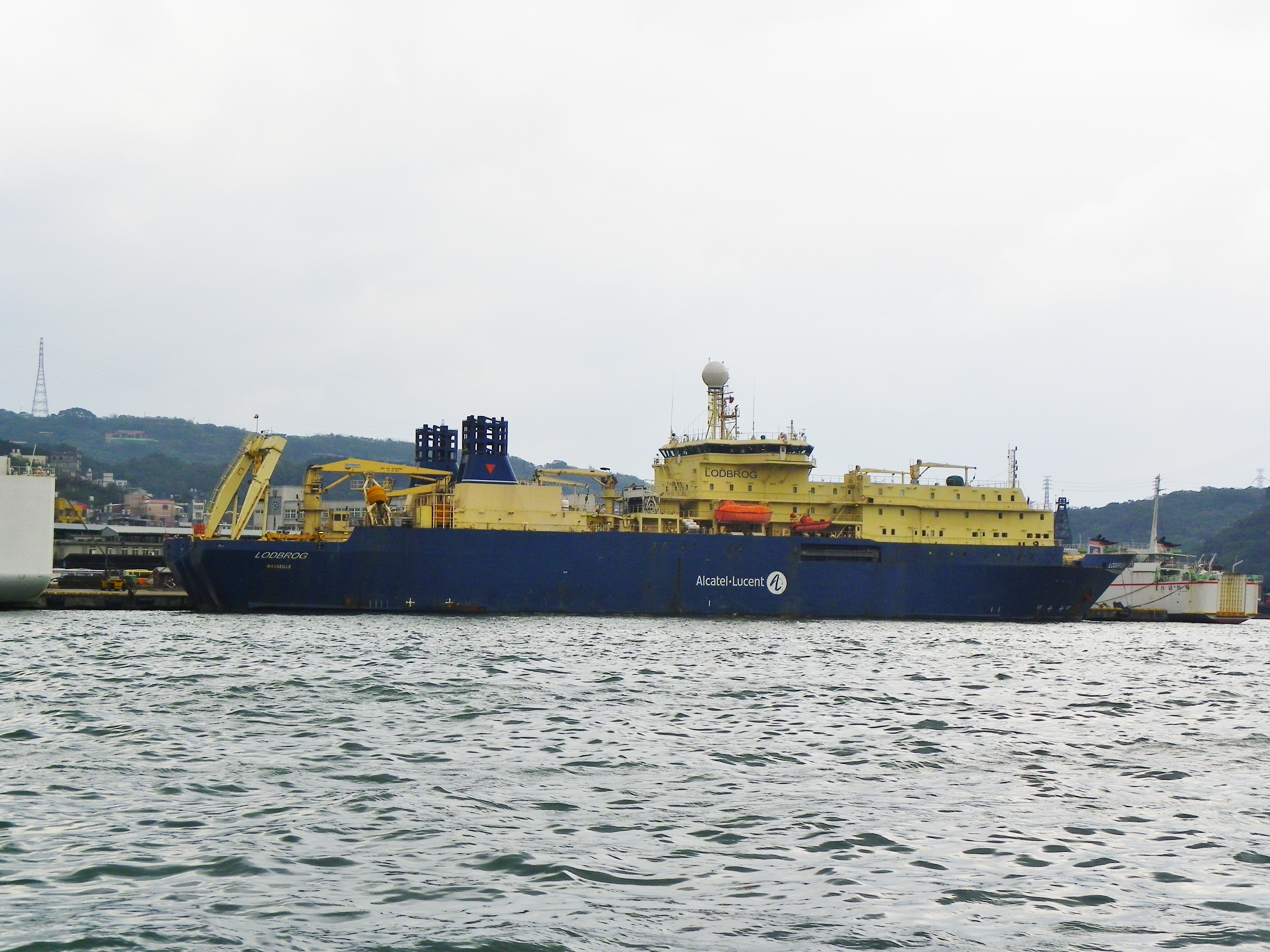
Alcatel-Lucent ship, CS Lodbrog, in Port Keelung in 2013

Alcatel Submarine Networks (ASN) is a provider of turnkey undersea network solutions. The business unit develops technology and offers installation services for optical submarine cable network links across the world's oceans.

Previously, Alcatel-Lucent Submarine Networks, also became part of Nokia in 2016. Nokia and ASN had added another cable ship to the fleet called, CS Ile d'Ouessant. The CS Ile d’Ouessant was purchased in 2019 and was originally built in 2011 as the CS Toisa Warrior. Additionally, in 2021, Nokia and ASN requested two cable ships for the fleet, the CS Ile d'Yeu and CS Ile de Molène.

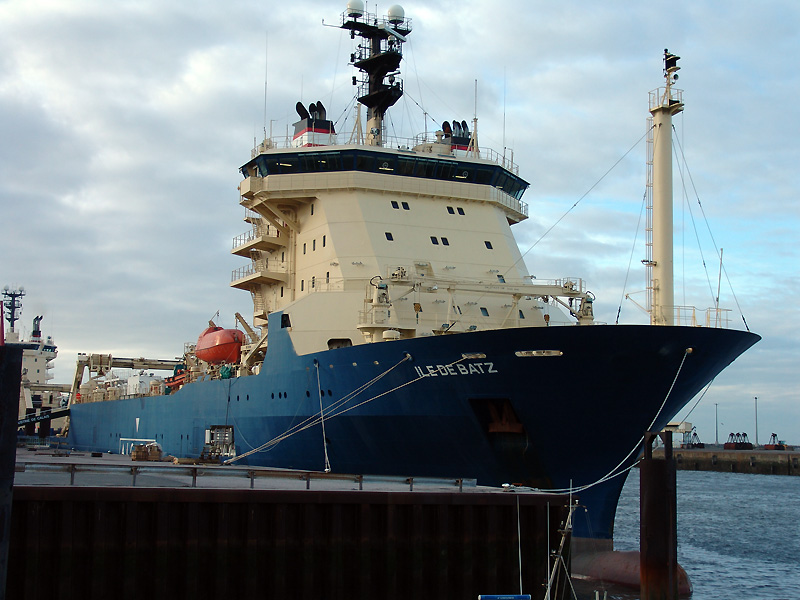
Alcatel cable ship Ile-de-Batz in 2004

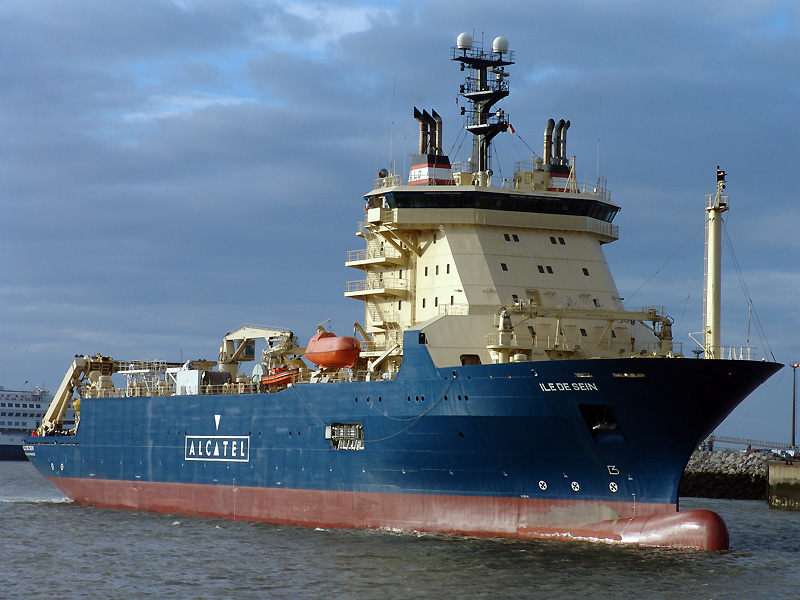
Alcatel cable ship ile de Sein in 2004

Here is a list of the cable-laying fleet from Alcatel (6), to Alcatel-Lucent (6 and 7), though Nokia (8):

- CS Ile d'Yeu (2001, 2021–Present) Built in 2001. Purchased in 2021 by Nokia ASN as two additional ships for a fleet of eight cable ships. (IMO 9230414)
- CS Ile d'Molène (2006, 2021–Present) Built in 2006. Purchased in 2021 by Nokia ASN two additional ships for a fleet of eight cable ships. (IMO 9329928)
- CS Ile d’Ouessant (2011, 2019–Present) Built in 2011 as the CS Toisa Warrior. Purchased by Nokia ASN in 2019. (IMO 9427108)
- CS Ile d'Aix (1992, 2011–Present) Built in 1992, as the cable ship, CS Gulmar Badaro. Purchased by Alcatel-Lucent in 2011, renaming the ship as CS Ile de AIX.
- CS Ile d' Brehat (2002–Present) Built in 2002. North route main lay of 4400 km for 2003 APOLLO route. Route clearance in 2015 for GTT Express.
- CS Ile d' Sein (2001–Present) Built in 2001, Length: 140.36 m, Cable work in 2003 of routes Azores to Madeira and Madeira to Porto Santo.
- CS Ile d' Batz (2001–Present) Built in 2001, 2003 APOLLO: Widemouth Bay, Bude, England to Brookhaven, USA and Lannion, France to Manasquan, USA, 2008 worked on TPE (Trans Pacific Express)
- CS Ile d' Re (1983–Present) Built in 1983, in 2006 worked on the APNG 2 cable route from Sydney, Australia to Port Moresby, Papua New Guinea. (OMS Group in August 2023 used MakaiLay software on ship, indication not part of ASN fleet.)
- CS Stanelco 2 (1975, 2000-Unknown) Built in 1975, Constructed by Brattvag Skips. in Brattvag. Named coaster Siraholm. Renamed in 1982 by Standard Telefon og Kabelfabrik when converted to cable repair ship. Sold to Alcatel Contracting Norway A/S, Oslo in 2000. (IMO 7382469, MMSI 341082000) (NOT IN NOKIA FLEET COUNT AS OF 2021) (OMS Group in August 2023 used MakaiLay software on ship, indication not part of ASN fleet.)
- CS Peter Faber 3 (1981) Built in 1981, 2003, provided old cable recovery in the Atlantic with ile de Sein. Optic Marine Services acquisition on 24 September 2019 of vessel continued ASN chartering the ship. (NOT IN NOKIA FLEET COUNT AS OF 2021) (Optic Marine Services Group in August 2023 used MakaiLay software on ship, indication not part of ASN fleet.)
- CS Lodbrog (1985, 2000-Unknown) Built in 1985 as Spiegelberg and Tuzla. Later renamed in 1996 as Bolero. (IMO 8027808, MMSI: 354400000) Registered to Alcatel in 2000. (NOT IN NOKIA FLEET COUNT AS OF 2021) (OMS Group in August 2023 used MakaiLay software on ship, indication not part of ASN fleet.)
- CS Heimdal (1983, 2000–2004) Built in 1983, 1988: Renamed FERRYMAR I. and reverted to MERCANDIAN ADMIRAL II. 2000: Converted to a repair and cable laying vessel and sold to Alcatel Submarine Networks Marine AS. 2003 performed repair of optical fiber in the Pacific Ocean, route between Japan and the United States, at almost 9,400 km deep. 2004: Sold to SEACOR Smit Offshore (Worldwide) Ltd, (SEACOR Marine (Asia) Pte Ltd (IMO 8207393, MMSI: 538002126) (SOLD IN 2004, NOT IN ALCATEL-LUCENT FLEET AS OF 2015)

== Corporate affairs ==
=== Business trends ===
The key trends for Nokia are (as of the financial year ending 31 December):

	Revenue (€ bn)	Net profit (€ bn)	Total assets (€ bn)	Employees
2007	51.0	7.2	37.5	112,000
2008	50.7	3.9	39.5	125,000
2009	40.9	0.89	35.7	123,000
2010	42.4	1.8	39.1	132,000
2011	38.6	−1.1	36.2	130,000
2012	30.1	−3.1	29.9	97,700
2013	12.7	−0.61	25.1	86,400
2014	12.7	3.4	21.0	57,500
2015	12.4	2.4	20.9	56,000
2016	23.6	−0.76	44.9	101,000
2017	23.1	−1.4	41.0	101,000
2018	22.5	−0.34	39.5	103,000
2019	23.3	0.007	39.1	98,300
2020	21.8	−2.5	36.1	92,000
2021	22.2	1.6	40.0	87,900
2022	24.9	4.2	42.9	86,800
2023	22.2	0.66	39.8	86,600
2024	19.2	1.2	39.1	80,300
2025	19.9	0.65	37.6	78,000

=== Corporate governance ===
The control and management of Nokia is divided among the shareholders at a general meeting and the Nokia Group Leadership Team (left), under the direction of the board of directors (right). The chairman and the rest of the Nokia Leadership Team members are appointed by the board of directors. Only the chairman of the Nokia Leadership Team can belong to both the board of directors and the Nokia Group Leadership Team. The Board of Directors' committees consist of the Audit Committee, the Personnel Committee, and the Corporate Governance and Nomination Committee.

The operations of the company are managed within the framework set by the Finnish Companies Act, Nokia's Articles of Association, and Corporate Governance Guidelines, supplemented by the board of directors' adopted charters. On 25 November 2019, Nokia announced that it would discontinue the role of Chief Operating Officer (COO) and distribute its functions to other company leaders. As a result, Chief Operating Officer Joerg Erlemeier decided to step down, effective 1 January 2020.

==== Former corporate officers ====
Chief executive officers
Name	Tenure
Björn Westerlund	1967–1977
Kari Kairamo	1977–1988
Simo Vuorilehto	1988–1992
Jorma Ollila	1992–2006
Olli-Pekka Kallasvuo	2006–2010
Stephen Elop	2010–2014
Rajeev Suri	2014–2020
Pekka Lundmark	2020–2025
Justin Hotard	2025–current

Chairpersons of the board of directors
Name	Tenure
Lauri J. Kivekäs	1967–1977
Björn Westerlund	1977–1979
Mika Tiivola	1979–1986
Kari Kairamo	1986–1988
Simo Vuorilehto	1988–1990
Mika Tiivola	1990–1992
Casimir Ehrnrooth	1992–1999
Jorma Ollila	1999–2012
Risto Siilasmaa	2012–2020
Sari Baldauf	2020–2026

=== Stock ===
Nokia is a public limited liability company and is the oldest company listed under the same name on the Helsinki Stock Exchange, beginning in 1915. Nokia has had a secondary listing on the New York Stock Exchange since 1994. Nokia shares were delisted from the London Stock Exchange in 2003, the Paris Stock Exchange in 2004, the Stockholm Stock Exchange in 2007 and the Frankfurt Stock Exchange in 2012. Due to the acquisition of Alcatel-Lucent in 2015, Nokia listed its shares again on the Paris Stock Exchange and was included in the CAC 40 index on 6 January 2016 but later removed on 18 September 2017.

In 2007, Nokia had a market capitalization of €110 billion; by 17 July 2012 this had fallen to €6.28 billion, before increasing to €26.0 billion by 23 February 2015. Nokia's market cap at 2020 was 21.76 billion.

=== Corporate culture ===
Nokia's official corporate culture manifesto since the 1990s is called The Nokia Way. It emphasizes the speed and flexibility of decision-making in a flat, networked organization.

The official business language of Nokia is English. All documentation is written in English, and is used in official intra-company communication.

In 1992, Nokia adopted values that were defined with the key words respect, achievement, renewal and challenge. In May 2007, the company redefined its values after initiating a series of discussion across its worldwide branches regarding what the new values of the company should be. Based on the employee suggestions, the new values were defined as: Engaging You, Achieving Together, Passion for Innovation and Very Human. In August 2014, Nokia redefined its values again after the sale of its Devices business, using the original 1992 values again.

=== Headquarters ===
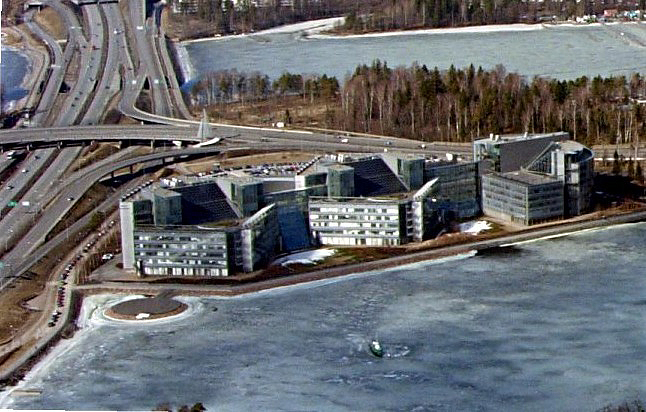
The former Nokia House, Nokia's head office until April 2014. The building is located by the Gulf of Finland in Keilaniemi, Espoo, and was constructed between 1995 and 1997. It was the workplace of more than 1,000 Nokia employees

Nokia are based at Karaportti in Espoo, Finland, just outside capital Helsinki. It has been its head office since 2014 after moving from the purpose-built Nokia House in Espoo as part of the sale of the mobile phone business to Microsoft. The building in Karaportti was previously the headquarters of NSN (now Nokia Networks).

== Awards and recognition ==
In 2018, Nokia received the Leading Lights award for most innovative cable/video product and was named to Ethisphere's 2018 world's most ethical companies list.

== Logo history ==
Nokia Osakeyhtiö logo, 1865

Nokia Osakeyhtiö logo, 1965

Finnish Rubber Works (Suomen Kumitehdas) logo, 1965–1986

Nokia 'Arrows' logo, after merging with the Cable Factory (Kaapelitehdas) and Finnish Rubber Works (1966–1992). Used in advertising and products until c. 1997.

Nokia introduced its "Connecting People" advertising slogan in 1992, coined by Ove Strandberg.

New slogan typeface (Nokia Sans font) introduced in 2005. Nokia Sans had been used by Nokia in products since 2002.

The company stopped using a slogan within its logo in 2011. Logo used on Nokia-branded consumer devices including phones made by HMD Global.

Current logo since 2023

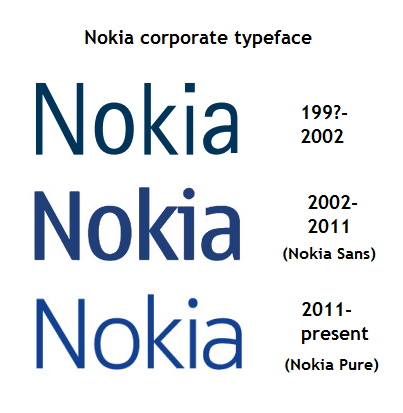
History of Nokia's corporate typeface

== Controversies ==
=== NSN's provision of intercept capability to Iran ===
In 2008, Nokia Siemens Networks, a joint venture between Nokia and Siemens AG, reportedly provided Iran's monopoly telecom company with technology that allowed it to intercept the Internet communications of its citizens. The technology reportedly allowed Iran to use deep packet inspection to read and change the content of emails, social media, and online phone calls. The technology "enables authorities to not only block communication but to monitor it to gather information about individuals, as well as alter it for disinformation purposes".

During the post-election protests in Iran in June 2009, Iran's Internet access was reported to have slowed to less than a tenth of its normal speeds, which experts suspected was due to using of deep packet inspection.

In July 2009, Nokia began to experience a boycott of its products and services in Iran. The boycott was led by consumers sympathetic to the post-election protest movement and targeted companies deemed to be collaborating with the regime. Demand for handsets fell and users began shunning SMS messaging.

Nokia Siemens Networks asserted in a press release that it provided Iran only with a "lawful intercept capability solely for monitoring of local voice calls" and that it "has not provided any deep packet inspection, web censorship, or Internet filtering capability to Iran".

=== Nokia–Apple patent dispute ===
In October 2009, Nokia filed a lawsuit against Apple Inc. in the U.S. District Court of Delaware claiming that Apple infringed on 10 of its patents related to wireless communication including data transfer. Apple was quick to respond with a countersuit filed in December 2009 accusing Nokia of 11 patent infringements. Apple's general counsel, Bruce Sewell went a step further by stating, "Other companies must compete with us by inventing their own technologies, not just by stealing ours." This resulted in a legal battle between the two telecom majors with Nokia filing another suit, this time with the U.S. International Trade Commission (ITC), alleging Apple had infringed its patents in "virtually all of its mobile phones, portable music players and computers". Nokia went on to ask the court to ban all U.S. imports of the Apple products, including the iPhone, Macintosh and iPod. Apple countersued by filing a complaint with the ITC in January 2010.

In June 2011, Apple settled with Nokia and agreed to an estimated one time payment of $600 million and royalties to Nokia. The two companies also agreed on a cross-licensing patents for some of their patented technologies.

=== Alleged tax evasion in India ===
Nokia's Indian subsidiary was charged in January 2013 with non-payment of Indian Tax Deducted at Source and transgressing transfer pricing norms in India. The unpaid TDS of ₹30 billion, accrued during a course of six years, was due to royalty paid by the Indian subsidiary to its parent company.

=== Nokia 7 Plus data breach ===
In March 2019, news broke that the company's Nokia 7 Plus phones were allegedly sending personal user data to China over several months. According to investigators, the gadget sent unencrypted data packages including geographical location, SIM card number, and the phone's serial number to an unidentified Chinese server every time that "the phone was turned on, the screen activated or unlocked." The data was sufficient to follow the movements and actions of the phone in real time.

Nokia brand owner HMD Global denied any such transfers had taken place, stating that it was instead the result of an error in the packing process of the phone's software. The Finnish Office of the Data Protection Ombudsman launched an investigation into the matter on the assumption "that personal data has been transferred."

=== Xinjiang region ===
In 2020, the Australian Strategic Policy Institute accused at least 82 major brands, including Nokia, of being connected to forced Uyghur labor in Xinjiang.
