= Ehrnrooth family =

Finnish noble family

Ehrnrooth
- Finnish noble family
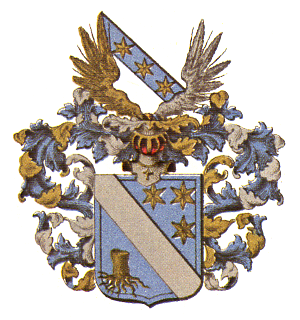
- Arms of the Ehrnrooth family
- Current region: Northern Europe (mainly Finland)

The Ehrnrooth family is a Swedish and Finnish noble family of German origin. It originated from Pomerania, and came to Finland from Livonia around 1600. Its status descends from Johan Plagman (1623–1696), who was raised to Swedish nobility in 1687. The family was registered in the Finnish House of Nobility in 1818. Members of the Ehrnrooth family have historically belonged to the Swedish-speaking population of Finland.

Many members of the family have been prominent in Finland's business community.

== Members of the family ==
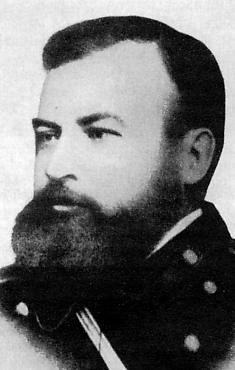
Johann Casimir Ehrnrooth.

- Adelaïde Ehrnrooth (1826–1905), writer, feminist
- Adolf Ehrnrooth (1905–2004), general
- Casimir Ehrnrooth (1931–2015), businessman, chairman of Nokia
- Georg C. Ehrnrooth (1926–2010), politician
- Göran Ehrnrooth (1905–1996), banker
- Göran J. Ehrnrooth (born 1934), CEO of Fiskars
- Johann Casimir Ehrnrooth (1833–1913), lieutenant general
- Leo Ehrnrooth (1877–1951), politician
- Nina Ehrnrooth (born 1962), alpine skier

== Göran Ehrnrooth 1905–1996 ==
Göran Ehrnrooth was a bank manager in Union Bank Finland. Göran Ehrnrooth was married to Louise von Julin, daughter of Jacob von Julin, the CEO of Kaukas paper factory. Their children are Casimir Ehrnrooth (born 1931) UPM-Kymmene CEO, Göran J. Ehrnrooth (born 1934), Robert Ehrnrooth (born 1939) EFFOA-Suomen Höyrylaiva CEO and Elsa Margaretha Louise Fromond (born 1942).

Casimir Ehrnrooth's children are Henrik Ehrnrooth (born 1954), CEO of Pöyry, Johanna Ehrnrooth (1958–2020), painter, Georg J. C. Ehrnrooth (born 1966), and Carl-Gustaf Ehrnrooth (born 1969), a member of Guggenheim Foundation Board of Directors since September 2008.
