= EQ Bank =

Finnish internet broker and asset manager

eQ Bank Ltd
- Type: Private
- Industry: Financial services
- Founded: 1998
- Headquarters: Helsinki, Finland
- Area served: Finland
- Key people: Antti Mäkinen (Managing Director)
- Products: Banking
- Revenue: EUR 48.3 million (2006)
- Net income: ▲EUR 18.7 million (2006)
- Number of employees: 170 (2006)
- Parent: eQ Corporation, owned by Straumur Investment Bank
- Website: https://www.eq.fi/

eQ Bank Abp, founded in 1998, is a Finnish bank specialising in internet brokerage and asset management for retail clients. The parent company of eQ Bank Abp, eQ Corporation, was acquired by Straumur Investment Bank in 2007 for approx 260 million euros. Nordnet bought eQ Bank Abp in May 2009 for 400 million Swedish crowns (approx 37 million euros at the time).

The bank was sold 22 May 2007 to Iceland’s Straumur Investment Bank. Finnish finance journal Arvopaperi wrote that now becomes rich persons including the Ehrnrooths, Antti Mäkinen being eQ manager only for 1½ years received about €26 million and Janne Larma by selling the Advium to eQ Bank with a share capital of eQ in 2004 received ca €26 million. Advium does real estate management including e.g. selling of shopping centers, hotels, retail units, car parks and other large building like Itis shopping centre, and Helsinki city properties of Forum block and Kamppi. Customers include Kapiteeli, Sato, Kesko retail, KONE main building, Tapiola insurance and other insurance companies. It had MBO in 2009.

== Straumur Investment Bank ==
The bank's board of directors in 2007 included Georg J.C. Ehrnrooth, Antti Mäkinen, Antti Pankakoski, Petteri Walldén, William Fall, Johan Horelli, Timo Everi ja Miika Varjovaara. In the end of 2006 Georg J. C. Ehrnrooth (born 1966) was Chairman of the Board and Member of the Board since 15 February 2000.

Major owners in 2007: In the end of 2006 (during the deal) the majority of shares 37.25% were held jointly by brothers Georg J.C. Ehrnrooth, Henrik Ehrnrooth and Carl-Gustaf Ehrnrooth via Fennogens Investments SA in Luxembourg.
