= Ketonen =

Ketonen is a Finnish surname. Notable people with the surname include:

- Arvo Ketonen (1888–1948), Finnish journalist, media executive and politician
- Irja Ketonen (1921–1988), Finnish media executive
- Kari Ketonen (born 1971), Finnish actor
- Carina Kirssi Ketonen (born 1976), Finnish former racing cyclist
