= Vuorineuvos =

Finnish honorary title

Vuorineuvos (Finnish: [ˈʋuo̯riˌneu̯ʋos], literally 'mountain councilor'; Swedish: bergsråd) is both a Finnish honorary title and a historical Swedish role on the Swedish Board of Mines. The Finnish title is granted by the President of Finland to leading figures in industry and commerce. The title is honorary and has no responsibilities and no privileges. All Finnish titles are non-hereditary. The only title of equal rank is valtioneuvos.

== Origin and history ==
The title originated in Sweden in 1713, a time when mining played a major role in the economy, and of which Finland was a part. Upon the reorganization of the Swedish Board of Mines that year, the role was created. It referred to a position on the board below the vice president and above mining assessor (vuoriasessori [Finnish], bergsassessor [Swedish]). In reference to a member of the board, the title was no longer used after 1857 when the Board of Mines became part of the National Board of Trade.

In the mid-18th century, five Finns were awarded the title. From 1809 to 1917 in the semi-autonomous, Russian-ruled Grand Duchy of Finland a further 19 titles were awarded. The first recipient of the vuorineuvos title in the modern Republic of Finland was Baron Fridolf Leopold Hisinger, on 17 July 1918. Awarding of the title has evolved to include not only giants of the mining industry but distinguished leaders in other industries and commerce. By 2010, the title had been granted to 295 people.

Honorees are usually chief executive officers or chairmen of the board of major corporations.

As of 2008, the title had been held by only two women: Irja Ketonen (1980), the principal owner and CEO of Turun Sanomat; and Maarit Toivanen (2008), then the CEO and chair of Onvest.

== High taxation of the title ==
The persons proposing that the honorary vuorineuvos title be conferred on someone are required to pay to the Finnish government a stamp duty. (48,400 euros in 2007).

The kauppaneuvos title dating back to the same era, by comparison, is taxed at the rate of 33,300 euros.

== Rejection of the title by notable would-be honorees ==
Antti Ahlström, the founder of Ahlstrom; Jorma Ollila, the former CEO of Nokia; and Pekka Herlin of KONE have refused the title out of personal preference.

== Translation advisory from the translation service of the Finnish prime minister's office ==
According to the translation service of the Finnish prime minister's office, there is no official or established English translation for the vuorineuvos title.

If it cannot be left out, the prime minister's office advises it best be used untranslated as "the Finnish honorary title of vuorineuvos".

In cases in which translators are not able to convince their customers that it is best left out or at least untranslated, the prime minister's office further directs, customers can usually be persuaded to accept the paraphrase "the highly respected industrialist X". Otherwise, a possible translation that does not ridicule the title holder would be "senior industrialist X", but this still conveys a very incorrect picture of Finnish society. "X, senior industrialist" would be a bit better.

== List of notable persons with the title ==
- Emil Aaltonen
- Edvin Bergroth
- Casimir Ehrnrooth
- Georg Ehrnrooth
- Göran Ehrnrooth
- Adolf Engström
- Erik Gillberg
- Berndt Grönblom
- Juhani Heinonen
- Heikki H. Herlin
- Stig H. Hästö
- Jaakko Ihamuotila
- Albert Lindsay von Julin
- Johan Albert von Julin
- Kari Kairamo
- Irja Ketonen
- Lauri Kivekäs
- Bertel Långhjelm
- Robert Lavonius
- William Lehtinen
- Tauno Matomäki
- Tor Nessling
- Uolevi Raade
- Martin Saarikangas
- Wilhelm Schauman
- Allan Staffans
- Julius Stjernvall
- Tor Stolpe
- Karl Söderman
- Uuno Takki
- Maarit Toivanen
- Yrjö Vesa
- Simo Vuorilehto
- Wilhelm Wahlforss
- Juuso Walden
- Verner Weckman
- Björn Westerlund
