= Adelphomyia =

Scientific classification
- Kingdom: Animalia
- Phylum: Arthropoda
- Clade: Pancrustacea
- Class: Insecta
- Order: Diptera
- Family: Limoniidae
- Subfamily: Limnophilinae
- Genus: Adelphomyia; Bergroth, 1891

Type species
- Adelphomyia helvetica Bergroth, 1891 [= punctum (Meigen, 1818)]

Species
- see text

Synonyms
- Tricholimnophila Alexander, 1928

Genus of flies

Adelphomyia is a genus of crane fly in the family Limoniidae.

== Species ==
- A. acicularis Alexander, 1954
- A. apoana Alexander, 1931
- A. basilobula Alexander, 1968
- A. biacus Alexander, 1954
- A. breviramus Alexander, 1924
- A. caesiella Alexander, 1929
- A. carbonicolor Alexander, 1931
- A. discalis Alexander, 1936
- A. excelsa Alexander, 1928
- A. ferocia Alexander, 1935
- A. flavella Alexander, 1920
- A. luzonensis Alexander, 1931
- A. macrotrichiata Alexander, 1923
- A. otiosa Alexander, 1968
- A. paucisetosa Alexander, 1931
- A. pilifer Alexander, 1919
- A. platystyla Alexander, 1928
- A. prionolaboides Alexander, 1934
- A. punctum Meigen, 1818
- A. rantaizana Alexander, 1929
- A. reductana Alexander, 1941
- A. saitamae Alexander, 1920
- A. satsumicola Alexander, 1930
- A. simplicistyla Alexander, 1940
