= Teboil =

Oil company in Finland

Oy Teboil Ab
- Industry: Oil and gas
- Founded: 1934; 92 years ago in Helsinki, Finland
- Founder: Mauritz Skogström
- Headquarters: Vantaa, Finland
- Area served: Finland, Russia
- Revenue: ▼1,677,872,000€ (2023)
- Number of employees: ▼180 (2023)
- Parent: Lukoil (2005–2025)
- Website: www.teboil.fi/en/

Oy Teboil Ab is an oil company in Finland. Teboil is engaged in the marketing, sales and distribution of petroleum products and operation of filling and service stations. It was founded in Helsinki in 1934. It was a subsidiary of the Russian company Lukoil from 2005 to 2025. Teboil has also been operating in Russia since 2022.

Teboil's revenue and profit plummeted after the Russian invasion of Ukraine in 2022 because of customer boycotts. Its revenue decreased by −28,8% in 2023. In 2024, Teboil made a loss of €58.7 million and its return on equity collapsed to −94.1%. According to a reputation survey conducted by the Finnish company T-Media, Teboil was one of the most poorly reputed companies in Finland in 2024.

== History ==
Teboil was established by Mauritz Skogström in Helsinki in 1934 at the name Trustivapaa Bensiini (meaning 'Trust-free Petrol (Benzene)'), abbr. TB, from which came the current name in 1966. At the same year, Estonian shale oil companies Eesti Kiviõli and New Consolidated Gold Fields became the main shareholders in the company. Another predecessor of Teboil, Suomen Petrooli, was established by German investors in Vyborg in 1932. During World War II, the ownership of Trustivapaa Bensiini was transferred to German owners and later the company was held by the Ehrnrooth family. After the Continuation War, in 1947 according to the Paris Peace Treaty TB became affiliated and it became the property of the Soviet Union state-owned company Soyuznefteexport. In 1966, the company changed its name to Teboil, which came from the pronouncing of its abbreviation TB with addition 'oil'. During these years, the Finnish government enterprise Neste held a legal monopoly in the wholesale of oil products, thus also Teboil actually obtained its petrol and diesel from Neste.

There is some evidence that Teboil kept tank fuel reserves, in the case the Soviets would invade. These were discontinued after the collapse of the Soviet Union.

In 1994 Soyuznefteexport was privatised and reorganised into Nafta-Moskva. In 2005, Nafta-Moskva sold Teboil to Lukoil. Teboil acquired JET unmanned stations chain in Finland, from the American company ConocoPhillips in 2006 and they were integrated into the Teboil chain as Teboil Express unmanned stations in 2007. The lubricant factory and laboratory functions of Teboil was moved to the subsidiary LLK Finland, founded in 2007. The three subsidiaries, Suomen Petrooli, Suomen Tähtihovit and Suomen Tähtiautomaatit were merged to the parent company in 2008. In 2022, Teboil started to operate in Russia.

On 3 March 2022, Teboil asked Finnish newspaper Kaleva not to use the term "war" when reporting on the company and the Russo-Ukrainian War and replace it with more neutral terms like conflict. In June 2025, Ukraine struck a Teboil service station in Belgorod, Russia, with an unmanned aerial vehicle, injuring four people and killing one.

In October 2025, the United States announced new sanctions targeting the Russian oil companies Lukoil and Rosneft. Lukoil owns Oy Teboil Ab. The sanctions include a one-month transition period, after which Oy Teboil Ab's payment transactions will cease.

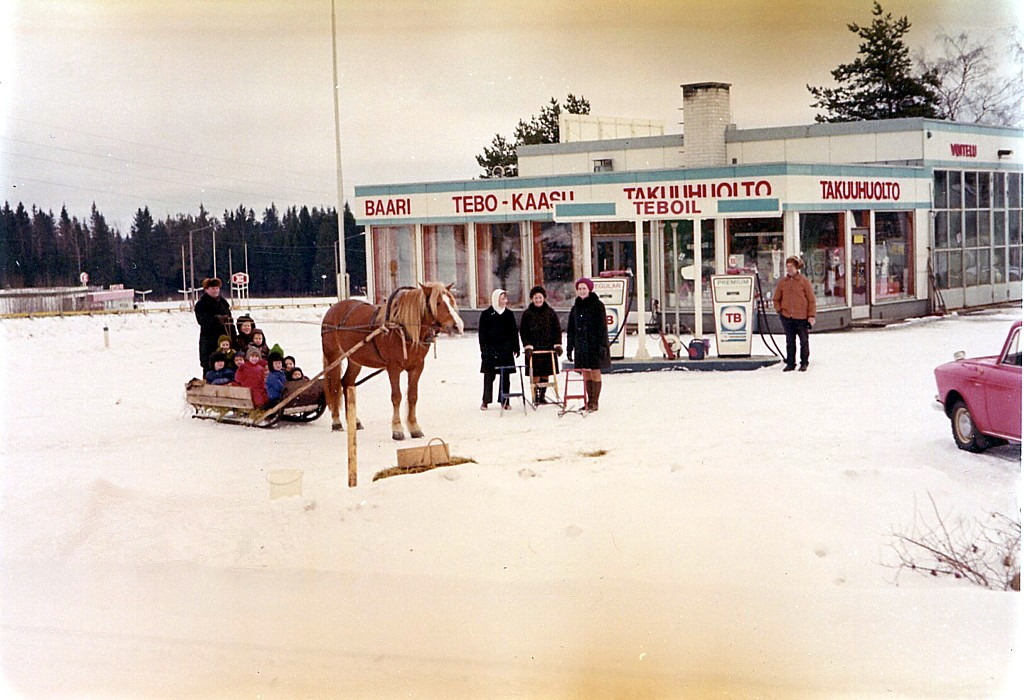
Teboil (TB) gas station, Urjala in 1957

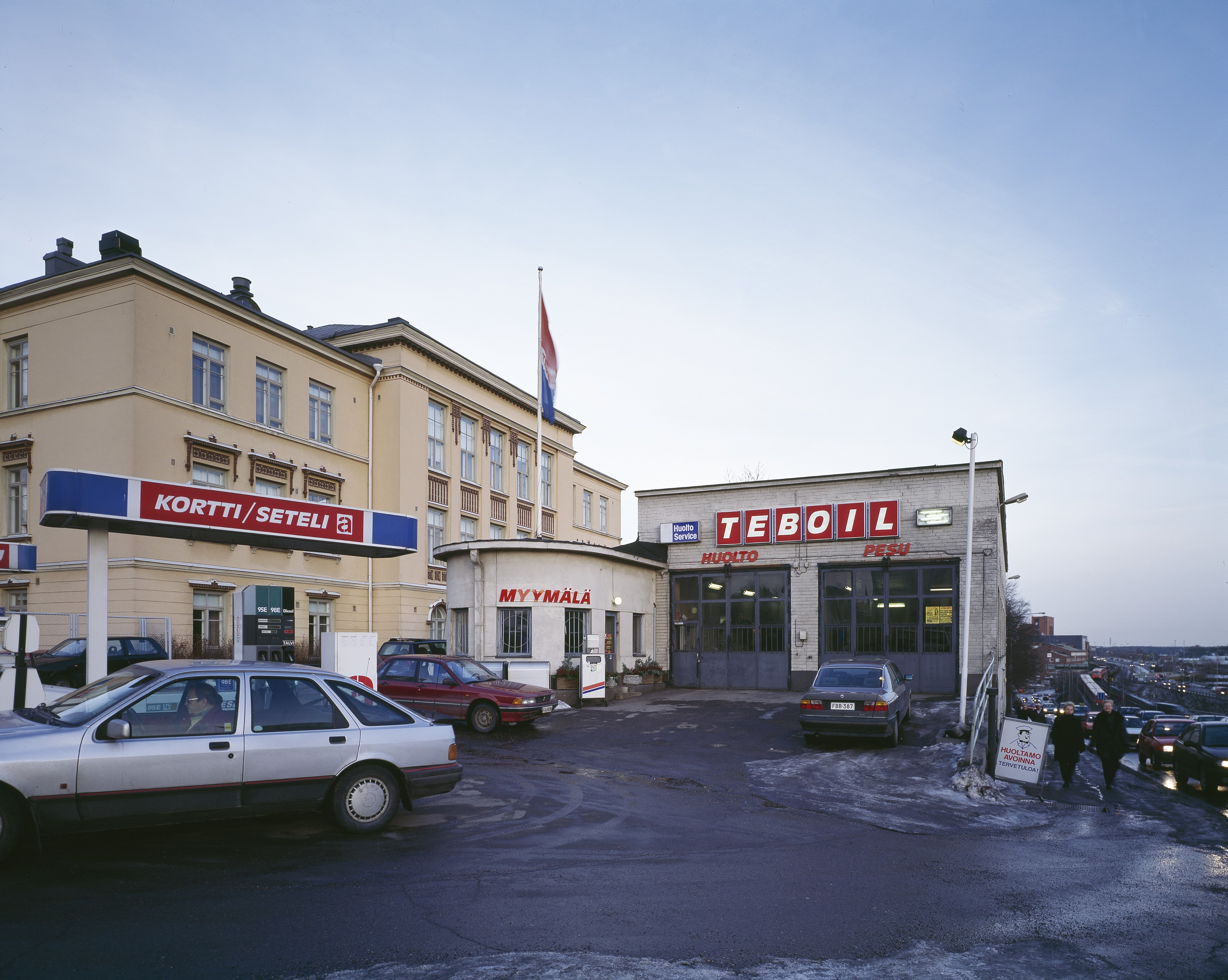
Teboil gas station, Hämeentie in 2001

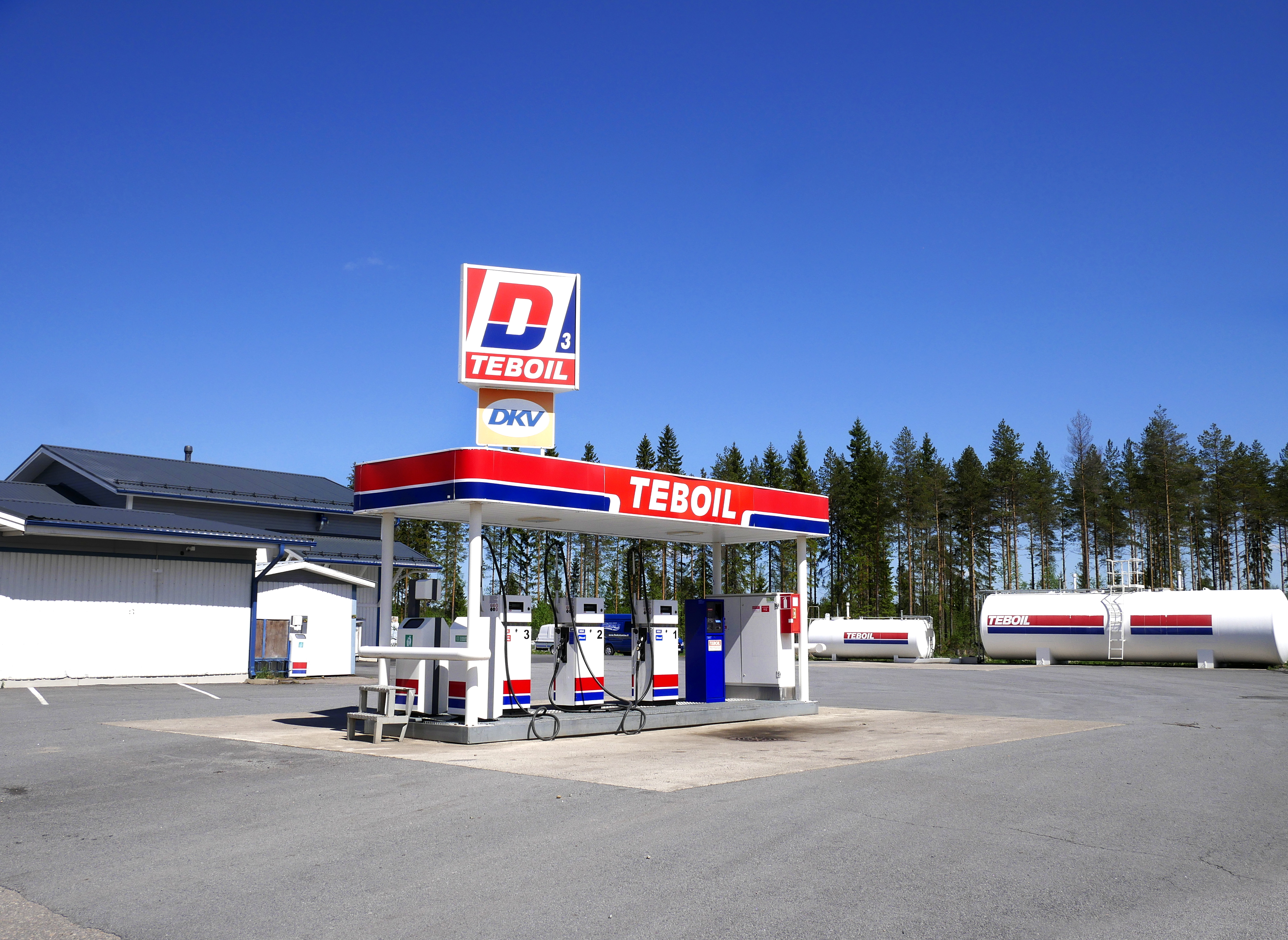
Teboil Disel

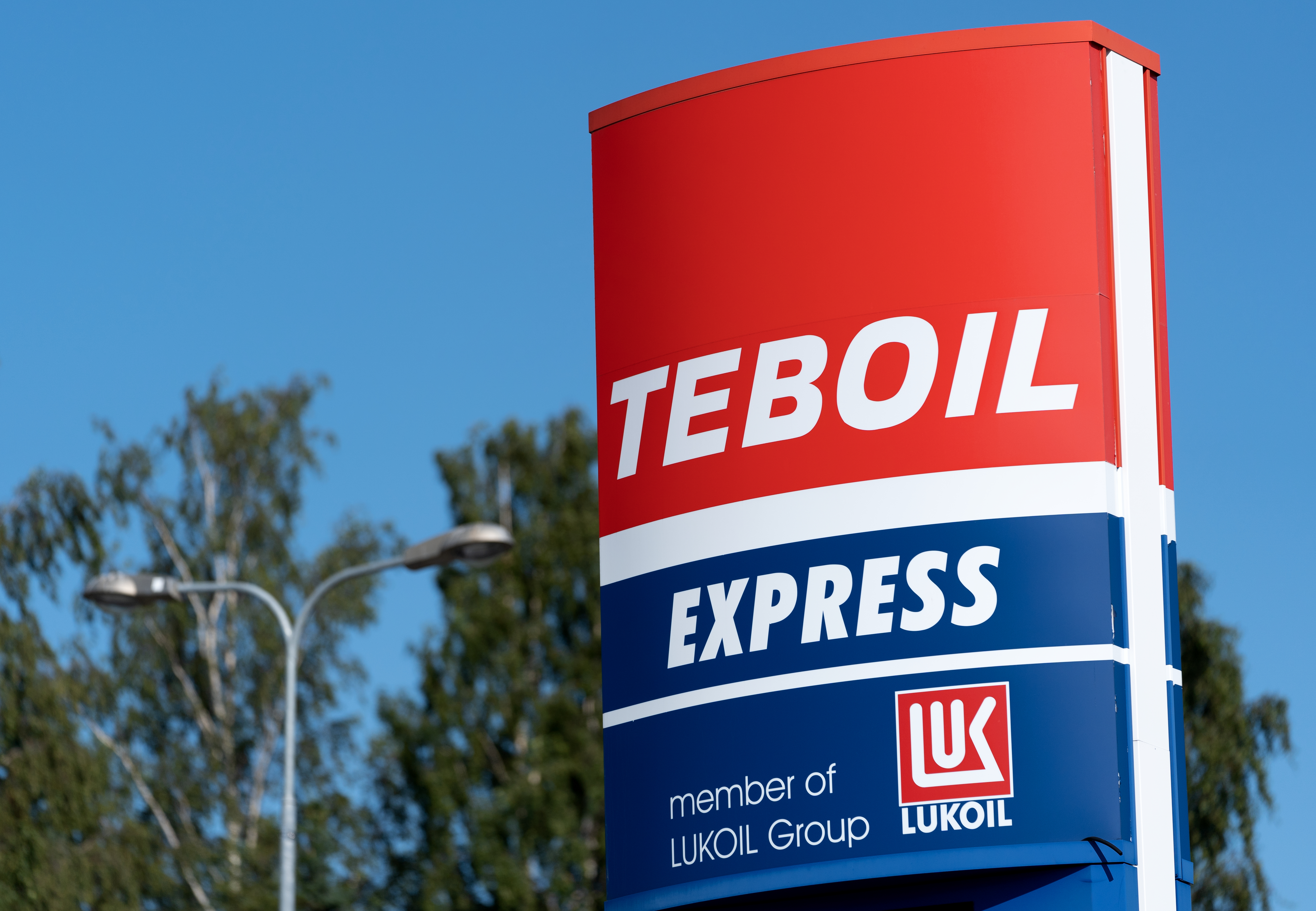
Teboil is member of Lukoil since 2005

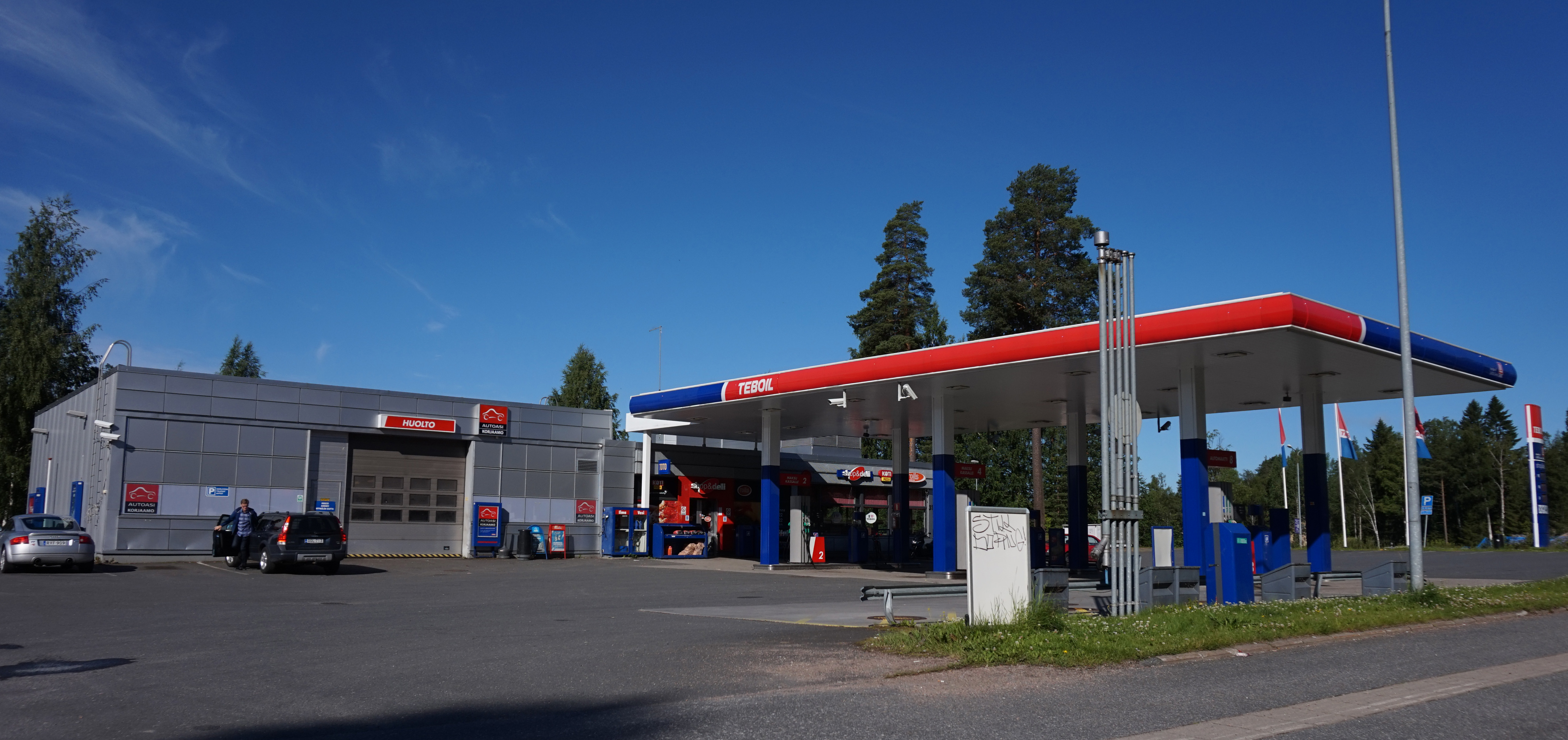
Teboil service station in Jyväskylä

== Service station network ==
At the end of year 2012 there were 336 business locations, of which 141 service stations and 195 unmanned refuelling stations. Commercial traffic is served by around 450 refuelling stations, of which about 210 are unmanned diesel points.

The brand Autoasi ('Of Your Car') works in the car maintenance and spare parts services of Teboil Service Centres.

== See also ==
- Energy in Finland
