= Grönblom =

Grönblom is a Swedish-language surname, most commonly occurring in Finland.

== Geographical distribution ==
As of 2014, 90.9% of all known bearers of the surname Grönblom were residents of Finland (frequency 1:36,645) and 8.5% of Sweden (1:703,340).

In Finland, the frequency of the surname was higher than national average (1:36,645) in the following regions:

1. Satakunta (1:5,617)
2. Southwest Finland (1:10,794)
3. Päijänne Tavastia (1:16,245)
4. Ostrobothnia (1:19,311)

== People ==
- Berndt Grönblom (1885–1970), Finnish industrialist
- Edgar Grönblom (1883–1960), Finnish industrialist; brother of Berndt
- Rabbe Grönblom (1950–2015), Finnish businessman
