= Göran J. Ehrnrooth =

Finnish businessman (born 1934)

Vuorineuvos Clas Göran Jakob Ehrnrooth (born 12 January 1934 in Helsinki), was the CEO of Fiskars from 1969 to 1983. He has also served as a member of the board for Virala Oy (1977-) and Wärtsilä (1992).

== Family ==
His parents were Göran Ehrnrooth (1905–1996), a bank manager and Louise von Julin, daughter of Jacob von Julin (1906–1987), the CEO of Kaukas paper factory. His siblings are Casimir Ehrnrooth (born 1931), Robert Ehrnrooth (1939) and Elsa Margaretha Louise (Fromond) (born 1942).

He has two children, Alexander (born 1974), and Albert (born 1976).
