= Carl-Gustaf Ehrnrooth =

Finnish investor (born 1969)

Carl-Gustaf Casimir Ehrnrooth (born 5 August 1969 in Helsinki) is a Finnish investor. He has been a member of the Guggenheim Foundation's Board of Directors since September 2008. The Guggenheim Foundation was targeting a museum in the city of Helsinki with public funds of €140 million or €300 million.

== Family ==
Carl-Gustaf Ehrnrooth's father was Casimir Ehrnrooth. His siblings are Henrik, Johanna and Georg.

== Business ==
Carl-Gustaf Ehrnrooth's family is the biggest owner of the construction company YIT, Structor S.A. 12.1% at the end of January 2012. Ehrnrooth's brother Henrik Ehrnrooth is the chairman of the YIT Board of Directors since 2009.

Ehrnrooth has ownership in Corbis Investments that includes stocks of Pöyry, Corbis is the major shareholder 30.96% in the end of March 2012. Structor S.A. and Corbis are both registered in Luxembourg.

Fennogens Investments S.A. is an Investment company in Luxembourg wholly owned by brothers Carl-Gustaf Ehrnrooth, Henrik Ehrnrooth and Georg Ehrnrooth. Fennogens Investments was the major shareholder with 10.98% of EQ Bank at the end of March 2012. eQ Corporation was acquired by Straumur Investment Bank in Iceland in 2007 for approx €260 million and bought back in May 2009 for circa 37 million at the time.

Ehrnrooth had earlier invited Guggenheim project initiator Janne Gallen-Kallela-Sirén as a member of the board in a company he was a major owner in.

== See also ==
- Guggenheim Helsinki Plan
