= Henrik Ehrnrooth =

Finnish businessman (born 1954)

Henrik Göran Casimir Ehrnrooth (born 7 July 1954) is a Finnish economist, manager and investor. Born in Helsinki, he has studied at the University of Helsinki and the Hanken School of Economics (1981).

== Pöyry ==
Ehrnrooth owns with his brothers Georg Ehrnrooth and Carl-Gustaf Ehrnrooth Corbis S.A., which is the biggest owner of the consulting and engineering firm Pöyry (2012). Ehrnrooth started as an economist at Pöyry in 1979. He was the managing director at Pöyry from 1986 and the concern manager from 1995. Ehrnrooth is a member of the company's board of directors since 1997 and chairman since 2003.

== YIT ==
Ehrnrooth family investment fund Structor is the biggest owner of the construction company YIT with a share of 12.1% in the end of January 2012. Ehrnrooth is the chairman of YIT's board of directors since 2009.

== Otava ==
Ehrnrooth is a member of the family media company Otava's board of directors since 1988.

== Family ==
Father Casimir Ehrnrooth (1931–2015) worked as the CEO in Kaukas paper factory (today UPM-Kymmene), and board of directors of Union Bank (today Nordea), and as chairman of Nokia (1992–1999).

Ehrnrooth's siblings are Johanna Ehrnrooth (1958–2020), Georg Ehrnrooth (1966) and Carl-Gustaf Ehrnrooth (1969). Johanna was a painter. Georg is also a member of Pöyry's board of directors.
