= Bergroth =

Bergroth is a Swedish-language surname, that is more common in Finland than in Sweden.

== Geographical distribution ==
As of 2014, 54.2% of all known bearers of the surname Bergroth were residents of Finland (frequency 1:24,322), 36.0% of Sweden (1:65,645), 3.1% of Argentina (1:3,287,963), 2.9% of Australia (1:1,981,156), 1.7% of the United States (1:51,607,325) and 1.2% of Norway (1:1,028,470).

In Finland, the frequency of the surname was higher than the national average (1:24,322) in the following regions:

1. Åland (1:2,153)
2. Central Ostrobothnia (1:2,229)
3. Southwest Finland (1:6,689)
4. Ostrobothnia (1:17,380)
5. Uusimaa (1:21,920)

In Sweden, the frequency of the surname was higher than the national average (1:65,645) in the following regions:

1. Gävleborg County (1:7,001)
2. Västmanland County (1:21,614)
3. Jönköping County (1:38,216)
4. Uppsala County (1:43,720)
5. Södermanland County (1:46,536)
6. Stockholm County (1:53,419)

== People ==
- Edvin Bergroth (1836–1917), Finnish engineer, businessman and vuorineuvos
- Ernst Evald Bergroth (1857–1925), Finnish physician and entomologist
- Kersti Bergroth (1886–1975), Finnish author and playwright
- Waldemar Bergroth (1852–1928), Finnish clergyman and politician
- Ilmi Hallsten née Bergroth (1862–1936), Finnish teacher and politician
- Jannika Wirtanen née Bergroth (b. 1985), Finnish singer
