= Adolf Engström =

Finnish engineer, businessman and vuorineuvos

vuorineuvos Carl Adolf Engström
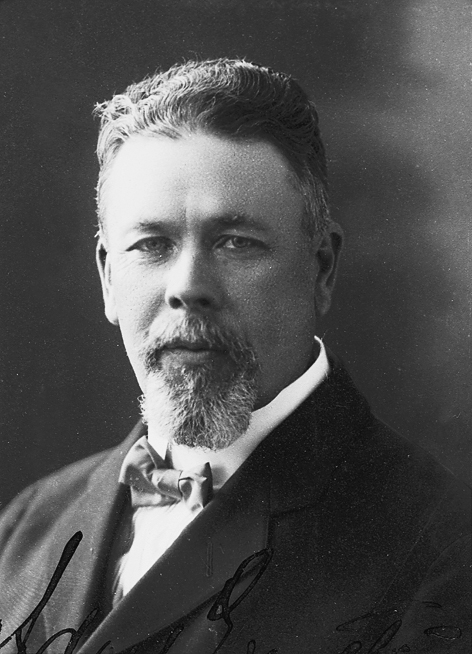
- Born: 17 February 1855; Vörå, Grand Duchy of Finland
- Died: 19 June 1924 (aged 69)
- Education: Helsinki Polytechnic School
- Board member of: Ab Granit (1896–); Finnish Engineering Industry Employers' Association; Finnish Employers' Central Association
- Spouse: 1885→ Eva Alexandra Karolina née Jansson
- Parent(s): Otto Leonhard Engström and Adolfina Christina née Taxell
- Awards: vuorineuvos (1917); St. Stanislaus Cross, 3rd class; honorary member of Swedish-speaking Engineering Society (1920)

Director of Ab Granit
- In office 1889–1895
- Preceded by: Sebastian Tammelander

Manager of Hietalahti Shipyard and Engineering Works
- In office 1900–1919
- Preceded by: Edvin Bergroth
- Succeeded by: Walter K. Åström

Carl Adolf Engström (17 February 1855 – 19 June 1924) was a Finnish engineer, businessman and vuorineuvos.

Engström got familiar already at early age with large machinery and engineering workshop environment due to his stepfather's work as engineer in the Finnish State Railways. After completing his mechanical engineering studies in Helsinki Polytechnic School in 1877, Engström went to gain experience abroad in Sweden, Germany, United Kingdom and United States.

Upon his return in 1884, Engström got vacance in the State Railways. He took successfully part in steam locomotive designing, which was followed by railway projects in Savonia and Karelia. He worked as director for stone company Ab Granit in 1889–1895, after which he returned to State Railways for another five years.

Engström was appointed manager of Hietalahti Shipyard and Engineering Works in 1900. During his time the company developed rapidly and the sales increased significantly, largely due to Russo-Japanese War and the First World War. On the other hand, the time was difficult due to increased strikes and confrontation between the workers and employers. Engström left his position as company manager in 1918; this was affected by the death of his son in the previous Finnish Civil War.

== Early life ==
Adolf Engström was born in Vörå, Ostrobothnia. His parents were land surveyor Leonhard Engström and Adolfina née Taxell, who was daughter of Messukylä vicar Jonas Gabriel Taxell. The couple had two daughters and sons Adolf and Otto. Leonhard Engström died when Adolf was four years old, and the widow married her late husband's older brother Carl Petter Engström, who was Mechanical Engineer. The family moved to Helsinki in 1862, and the Ostrobothnian boy had to adopt to a new environment. The stepfather worked for the Finnish State Railways, and that way Adolf got familiar with engineering workshops and large machinery during his childhood. C. P. Engström became Chief Engineer in the State Railways in 1870 and during 1877–1890 he was board member in railway administration.

== Studies and early career ==
Engström graduated from Helsinki Swedish Normal Lyceum in 1874 and continued his studies in Helsinki Polytechnic School and graduated Mechanical Engineer in 1877. He wanted to gain abroad useful practical experience abroad, which he could later use for developing his home country. Engström first worked for Motala Engineering Works in Sweden as draftsman, and then in Germany for Hannoversche Maschinenbau AG and Hohenzollern Locomotive Works. He went next to England, where he worked for Beyer, Peacock & Company in Manchester. Engström's following step was the United States; he worked for Pennsylvania Railroad's Altoona Works.

== State Railways ==
In 1884 Engström returned to Finland, for State Railways, to take part in a locomotive project. The target was to design a locomotive suitable for Oulu railway; it should be firewood compatible and also stronger and more fuel efficient, than a type used on Nikolaistad (Vaasa) railway. Engström redesigned the firebox and made the structure more robust. This locomotive type was produced total 104 units.

After the Oulu railway was built, Engström continued in Savonian and Karelian railway projects. He worked for State Railways until 1889.

Engström returned to State Railways for 1895–1900 to work as engineering workshop manager's assistant.

== Ab Granit ==
As there were no new railway development projects, Engström sought for new opportunities. In 1889 he was appointed director and technical manager of Ab Granit, which was a stone company in Hanko. The company had gained foothold in construction business in Helsinki and grown amongst 30 largest companies of Finland. At the turn of the 1890s the company employed 268 people. The 1894 erected Tsar Alexander II statue in Senate Square, of which foundation was constructed by Granit, promoted the company's sales in Russia.

== Hietalahti Shipyard and Engineering Works ==
Engström was appointed manager of Sandvikens Skeppsdocka och Mekaniska Verkstads Ab ("Hietalahti Shipyard and Engineering Works") in 1900. He followed engineer Edvin Bergroth, who was the first manager of the company that was re-established after bankruptcy. Bergroth had developed the operations through investments, and Engström received leadership of a financially solid company, which he continued developing determinedly. Engström sometimes faced situations which needed quick decisions – he for example received repair work of a shipwrecked vessel which was too large to the dock; the dock was extended during the salvage process.

The Russo-Japanese War in 1904–1905 led to increased order intake of torpedo boats for the Imperial Russian Navy. During 1900–1914 the company built total about 60 steam and motor vessels. In addition to shipbuilding, the company produced large number of ship engines, steam boilers and also railway wagons. Engström's personal contribution was significant in the rolling stock production, and the wagon projects balanced the wintertime docking workload drop.

Engström developed and modernised the shipyard; this meant new methods, as electrical welding and pneumatic tools. The dock was further extended in 1910 and 1912 and a new brass foundry was taken into use in 1914. Two years later a new main engineering workshop was opened. Prior to the First World War, the company employed 597 people and the annual sales reached 2.4 million marks. The First World War increased the business again; during 1915–1917 the company docked total 400 vessels. Engström had also further plans which did not actualise, such as a new dock layout, that would have enabled building many large ships simultaneously. All the investments were funded by company profit, and the company did not collect capital from outside during that. By 1919, when Engström left his position, the share capital had grown from half million to six million marks.

Engström's era as shipyard leader was the time of organisation of labour and employers. The yard experienced some occasional strikes at the late 19th century, and after the yard faced larger strikes and conflicts in 1902, Engström called other engineering industry employers to negotiate about forming an employers' association. The first general collective agreement between the union and employers was signed in 1906. Already in 1908 the employers planned to end the agreements because they had not put an end to striking. At the beginning Engström supported collective agreements, but changed his mind in 1909. This led to a long-term strike, which eventually ended to defeat for the union – the engineering industry workers returned to work without having a collective agreement. Consequently, the relations between employers' association and trade unions suffered badly.

== Organisational activities ==
Engström was founding member of the 1903 created Finnish Engineering Industry Employers' Association and deputy chairman until 1911, after which he served as chairman until 1919. He also took part in founding the Swedish Technical Science Academy of Finland and he became honorary member of the Finnish Technical Association in 1920. During 1903–1911 he was member of Helsinki City Council.

== Committee memberships ==
- Railway Economy Investigation Committee, 1885–1895 and 1906
- Railway Committee, 1892–1893
- Committee for Railway Rolling Stock Construction Promotion, 1896
- Representative of Finland in International Railway Conference, 1895
- Vocational Education Committee, 1908
- Advisor member of Railway Administration, 1908–1916
- Domestic Shipbuilding Promotion Committee, 1912 and 1919
- Railway Administration Inspector General, 1919–1922

== Personal life ==
Engström married Eva Alexandra Karolina née Jansson in 1885. Their only son died in the Finnish Civil War in 1918. This made Engström to leave his position as company manager. The couple donated a large sum to be shared as scholarships to young technicians, who were orientated to shipbuilding and engineering industry.

== Sources ==
- Osakeyhtiö Hietalahden Sulkutelakka ja Konepaja – aikaisemmin Helsingfors Skeppsdocka [Hietalahti Shipyard and Engineering Works Limited – formerly Helsinki Shipyard] (in Finnish). Helsinki: Osakeyhtiö Hietalahden Sulkutelakka ja Konepaja. 1935.
