= Stig H. Hästö =

vuorineuvos Stig Herman Hästö
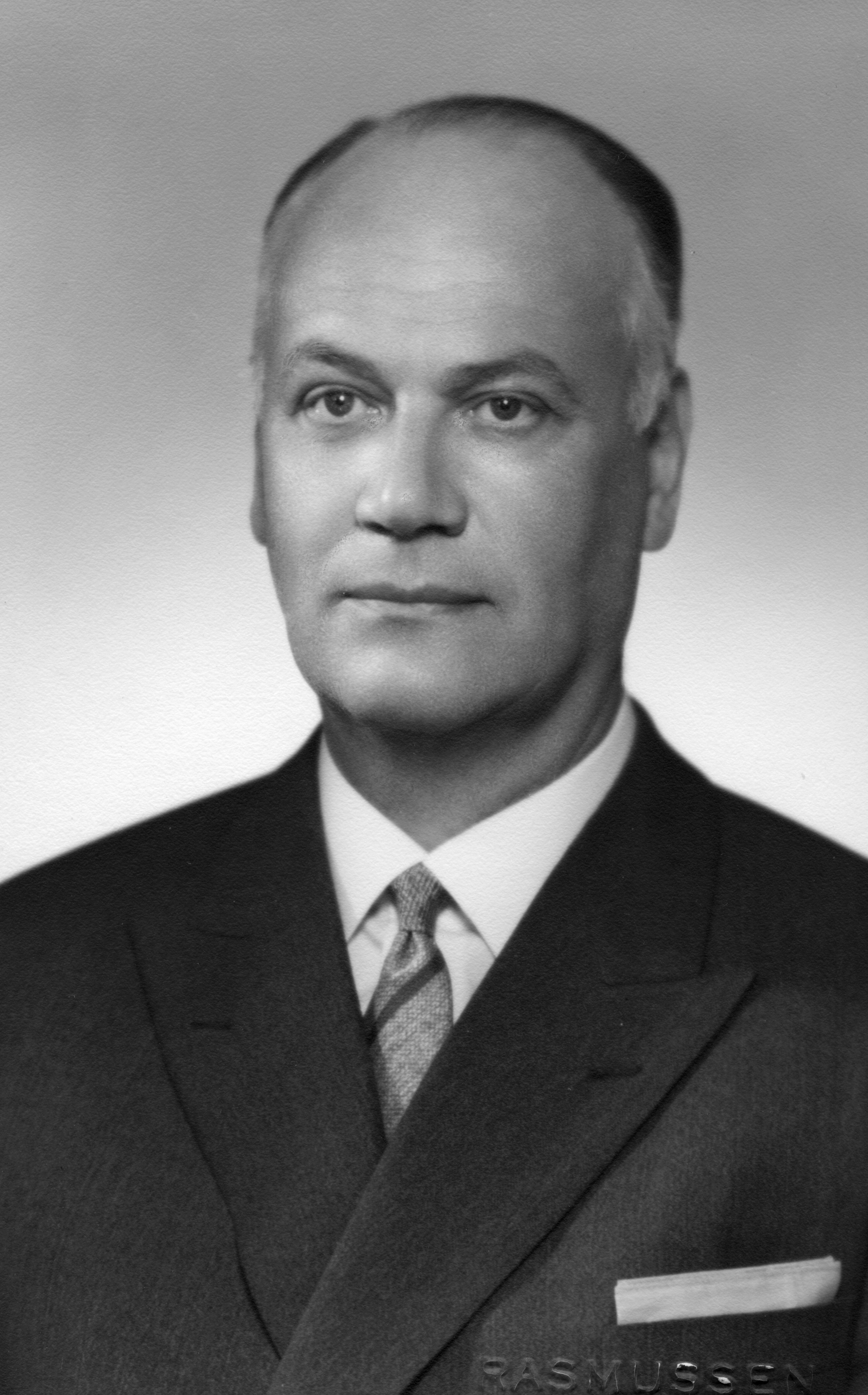
- Born: 19 March 1918; Pori, Finland
- Died: 14 September 1997 (aged 79); Helsinki, Finland
- Citizenship: Finnish
- Education: jurist
- Board member of: Finnish Employers' Central Association (STK; 1962–1964; 1968–1979); Finnish Textile Industry Employers' Association (1967–1975); Tampere Chamber of Commerce (1964–1965); Suomen Trikoo (1977–1979); Finnish Foreign Trade Association (1980–1983)
- Awards: Commander of the Order of the Lion of Finland, 1st class; Cross of Liberty, 3rd Class; Cross of Liberty, 4th Class; Knight of the White Rose of Finland, 1st class; Memorial Medal for Winter War; Memorial Medal for Continuation War; Commander of the Polar Star, 1st class; vuorineuvos (1970); Karelia Award

Manager of Finlayson
- In office 1962–1978
- Preceded by: Sadi Sandell

Manager of TKL
- In office 1979–1983
- Preceded by: Timo Laatunen
- Succeeded by: Timo Relander

Stig Herman Hästö (19 March 1918 – 14 September 1997) was a Finnish businessman and vuorineuvos. He served as manager of the textile company Finlayson from 1962 to 1978, as chairman of the Finnish Employers' Central Association (STK) from 1977 to 1979, and as manager of the Central Association of Industry (TKL) from 1979 to 1983. His most significant contribution is generally regarded to have been as leader of the central organisations of Finnish business and industry.

== Childhood, war years and studies ==
Hästö's Finland-Swedish father, manager Mats Hästö, had roots in Ostrobothnia, while his Finnish-speaking mother Ellen née Grönroos was from Satakunta. The family settled in Viipuri after the Finnish Civil War, in which the father had served on the White side. He attended a Swedish-language school in Viipuri, although his childhood environment was otherwise predominantly Finnish-speaking, and he grew up fully bilingual. The father died as early as 1923, after which the widowed mother secured a decent living standard for the family and an education for her three sons by running her own café.

However, the Winter War interrupted Hästö's law studies. He was promoted officer in the Continuation War and served in the Finnish Armoured Division. During the trench warfare stage he continued his studies. In 1944 he took part in Battle of Kuuterselkä and was severely wounded in the Tali. He studied during his convalescence and graduated in 1946.

== Early career ==
After working briefly as a lawyer, in 1948 Hästö became a delegate of the Finnish Engineering Industry Employers' Association, where he became familiar with the turbulent post-war labour market. Although he had grown up with the legacy of the White side of the Civil War, he came to understand and appreciate many of the trade union leaders he negotiated with. He clashed, however, with Väinö Karikoski, the manager of the Finnish Employers' Central Association (STK), over Karikoski's management style.

== Finlayson ==
Hästö's ambition was to lead a major company. He received several offers but was selective, and in 1957 he accepted the position of Deputy Manager at the textile producer Finlayson. As the industry was new to him, he received a thorough introduction from Sadi Sandell, the company's long-standing manager, and undertook a study trip to the United States.

While Finlayson was an old and financially stable company and also a highly considered brand, Hästö saw its future as uncertain; the company's position relied on high import tariffs and a domestic cartel. He realised that this position was unsustainable in view of the trend towards free trade. The company needed modernisation, but when Hästö was appointed manager in 1962, he proceeded carefully. The board chairmen, first Sandell and then Lauri J. Kivekäs, the dominant leader of the Emil Aaltonen group, resisted change. Hästö diversified the portfolio in line with contemporary management trends. After Finland signed an associate membership agreement with EFTA in the 1960s, the company maintained its position in the domestic market and increased its exports through modern design, and its plastics production grew substantially. A drawback came through two mergers, in which Finlayson took over a cotton company in Vaasa and another in Pori. Both units were unprofitable, but Hästö, who had opposed the mergers, deferred to the wishes of Finlayson's owners.

Finlayson fell into difficulties during the oil crisis of 1973. Hästö blamed unfavourable Soviet trade agreements, signed under pressure from Finnish officials, although the cotton industry across the Western world was facing similar problems due to intense competition. Hästö restructured the organisation into independent units based on product categories, but this did not bring the desired results. In 1976 Hästö became increasingly involved again in employers' associations and was elected chairman of STK that year, although he had initially resisted his nomination. Although the new role presumably limited his ability to focus on Finlayson's problems, the company began to recover. Hästö is widely credited with contributing to the recovery from the late-1970s recession and to the so-called "Korpilampi spirit" of 1977, a period of broad consensus between government, employers and trade unions on economic policy. Hästö stepped down as manager in 1978 but continued as chairman of the board until 1979.

== TKL manager ==
The Central Association of Industry (TKL), founded in 1975, suffered from internal disputes. Hästö mediated these disagreements successfully, and when TKL manager Timo Laatunen left, Hästö was selected to succeed him in 1979. His tenure was relatively easy; the recession of the 1970s had been overcome and Soviet trade was still running well. Over time, Hästö established relations with president Urho Kekkonen. When Kekkonen withdrew from office in 1981, some industrial leaders sought TKL's support for Ahti Karjalainen as his successor, believing him to be the best guarantor of Soviet trade, which was vital to the country. Although Hästö personally took a neutral and reserved approach, he did not oppose a joint TKL statement that was widely interpreted as indirect support for Karjalainen. Mauno Koivisto of the SDP was elected president in the 1982 election, and the TKL statement weakened the association's relationship with the Social Democrats.

Towards the end of his term, Hästö examined ways of improving co-operation between STK and TKL and proposed merging the two associations. This merger took place only later, in the 1990s. Hästö also suggested other changes, but his achievements at TKL remained modest. He retired in 1983.

== Later years ==
After his retirement Hästö held positions of trust in the European business confederation UNICE and in OECD's Business and Industry Advisory Committee (BIAC). He wrote his memoirs in both Finnish and Swedish, and also published a book on the events of summer 1944 in his childhood city of Viipuri.

== Personal life ==
In 1944 Hästö married Gunvor née Gräsbeck. The couple had two sons and a daughter born in 1947, 1948 and 1951. After his divorce, Hästö had Mary Botschmanoff née Indrenius-Zalewski as a long-time partner.

== Bibliography ==
- Hästö, Stig (1987). Vuodet kertyvät, pilvet haihtuvat – omaelämäkerrallista tarinaa ja mietteitä seitsemältä vuosikymmeneltä [Years accumulate, clouds go aside – autobiographical stories and thoughts from seven decades] (in Finnish). Porvoo: WSOY. ISBN 9789510146866. In Swedish: Från Pehrsgatan 6 till Champs Elysées – självbiografiska berättelser från sju decennier. ISBN 9789515211668.
- Hästö, Stig (1989). Syreenit kukkivat vielä – muistoja ja tunnelmia Viipurissa kesällä 1944 [Lilacs are still blossoming – memories and feelings from Viipuri in summer 1944] (in Finnish). Helsinki: WSOY. ISBN 9789510158364. In Swedish: Farväl Wiborg – minnen och verklighet då Wiborgs öde beseglades. ISBN 9789515212504.
