= Kari Kairamo =

Finnish businessman (1932–1988)

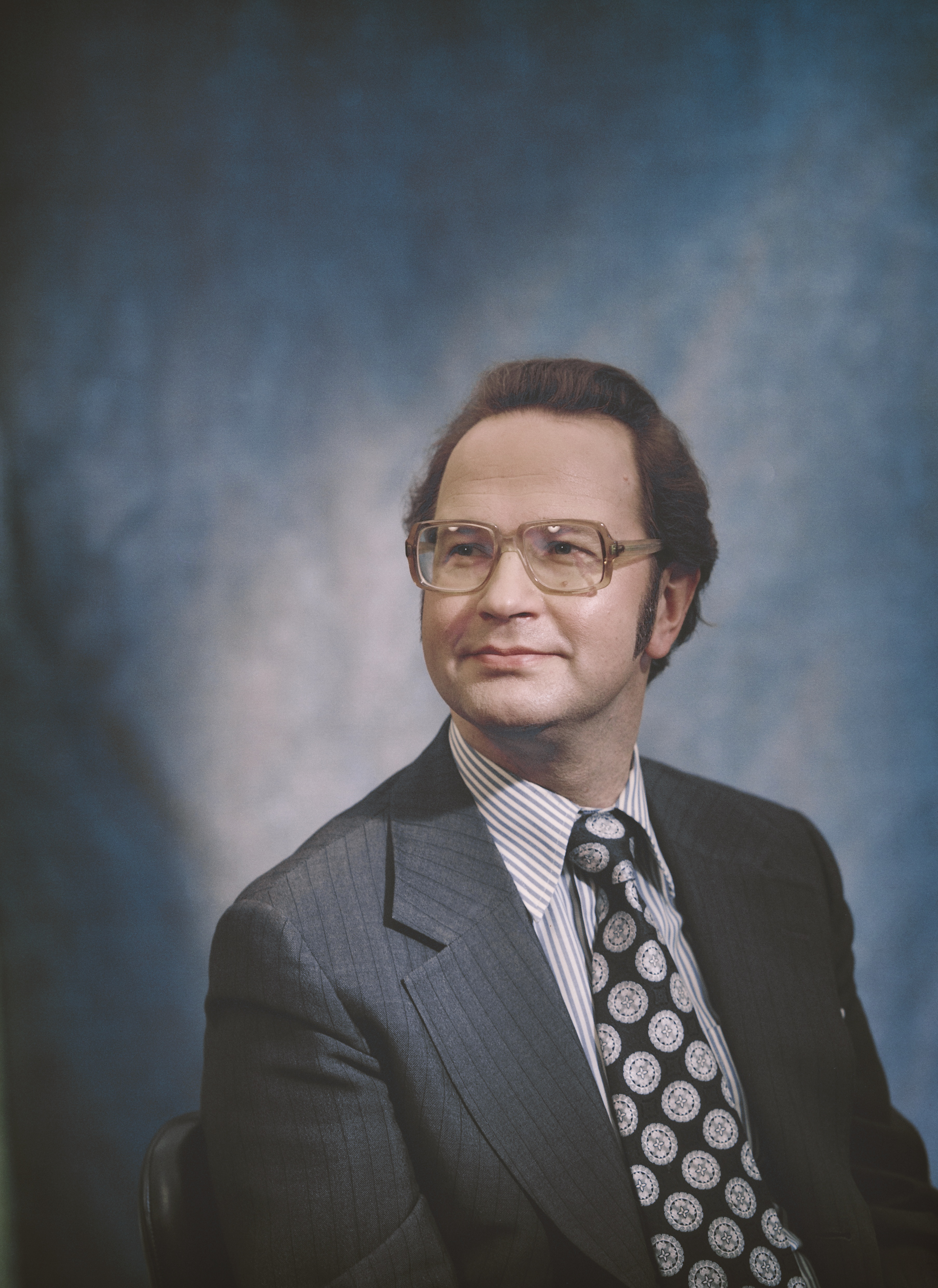
Kari Kairamo in 1976.

Kari Antero Oswald Kairamo, titled Vuorineuvos (31 December 1932 – 11 December 1988), was chairman and CEO of the Nokia Corporation and a significant and popular person in the industry, who was also actively involved in Finland's foreign policy. He was born in Helsinki, Finland.

== Biography ==
=== Career ===
Kari Kairamo had a master's degree in engineering (wood processing). Early on in his career, he had leading positions in several international firms in the paper industry. Nokia hired him in 1967, when it was still a major player in the forest industry, then became CEO of Nokia after Björn Westerlund retired in 1977. Kairamo's mission was to build Nokia fast into an internationally large multi-industry company, and he led several acquisitions for the company.

The late 1980s was a very special period for both the Nokia Corporation and Finland. The place Finland occupied on the map of Europe was about to change, and the cold war and protectionism in the Finnish trade politics were about to break down. Kairamo saw the importance of Nokia, the biggest company in Finland, as an agent in getting Finland closer to Western Europe, although at the same time, he considered the Soviet Union to be an important trade partner and managed to retain close relations with major Soviet politicians and business leaders.

=== Death ===
Kari Kairamo hanged himself in his home in Espoo on 11 December 1988, an act which Nokia at first attempted to hide. Bipolar disorder is a commonly suspected reason for his decision. As he was part of the Kihlman family, famous for their artists, some people close to the family suspect he was manic-depressive like many great artists.

== Bibliography ==
The Decline and Fall of Nokia by David Cord, published in 2014

The Finnish series "Mobile 101" combines fiction while tracing the brand's early days in the mobile phone industry. Directed by Maarit Lalli in 2022, and starring Oona Airola, Satu Tuuli Karhu, and Aku Sipola.

Business positions
Preceded by Björn Westerlund	Nokia Corporation CEO; 1977–1988	Succeeded by Simo Vuorilehto
Preceded by Mika Tiivola	Nokia Corporation Chairman; 1986–1988	Succeeded by Simo Vuorilehto
