= Björn Westerlund =

Finnish politician and businessman

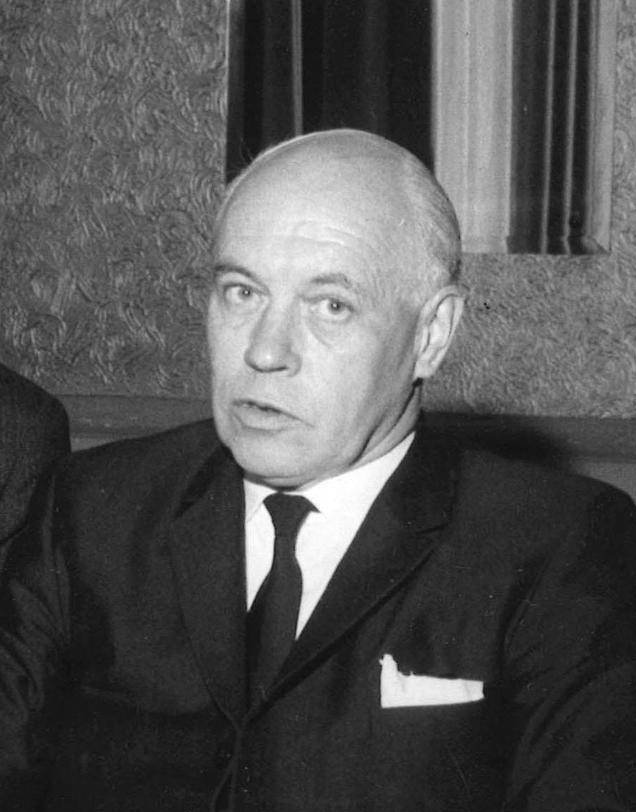
- Westerlund in 1966
- Born: Björn Georg Wilhelm Westerlund; 27 January 1912; Hanover, German Empire
- Died: 11 March 2009 (aged 97); Helsinki, Finland
- Other name: "Nalle"
- Education: Helsinki University of Technology
- Known for: President and CEO, Nokia Corporation
- Title: vuorineuvos
- Political party: Swedish People's Party

Björn Georg Wilhelm Westerlund, titled Vuorineuvos (27 January 1912 in Hanover, Germany – 11 March 2009 in Helsinki, Finland), was a Finnish businessman and a short-time minister in the government of Finland. He was the former and first President and CEO of Nokia Corporation that was formed in a 1967 merger between the three Finnish companies Nokia Company, Finnish Rubber Works and Kaapelitehdas (Cable Company). He was the CEO until his retirement in 1977. He remained Chairman of the Board until 1979.

He was also the Minister of Trade and Industry for a short while (19 June to 14 July 1961) in V. J. Sukselainen's second government, as a representative of Swedish People's Party.

Business positions
Preceded by –	Nokia Corporation CEO; 1967–1977	Succeeded by Kari Kairamo
Preceded by Lauri J. Kivekäs	Nokia Corporation Chairman; 1977–1979	Succeeded by Mika Tiivola
Political offices
Preceded by Ahti Karjalainen	Minister of Trade and Industry; 1961	Succeeded by Ilmari Hustich
