= Lauri Kivekäs =

Finnish businessman (1903–1998)

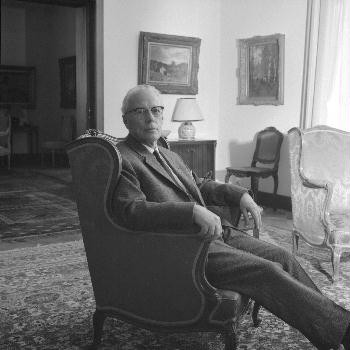
Lauri Kivekäs Portrait

Lauri Jaakko Kivekäs, titled Vuorineuvos (7 July 1903, in Muuruvesi, Finland – 12 February 1998; surname until 1926 Stenbäck), was a Finnish businessman. He served as Minister of Trade and Industry from 1957 to 1958. He was the former chairman of Confederation of Finnish Industries and the first chairman of Nokia Corporation after the 1967 merger of the three Finnish companies Nokia Company, Finnish Rubber Works and Finnish Cable Works. He remained Nokia Chairman until 1977 when he was replaced by Björn Westerlund.

Business positions
Preceded by –	Nokia Corporation Chairman; 1967–1977	Succeeded by Björn Westerlund
