= Simo Vuorilehto =

Finnish businessman (1930–2024)

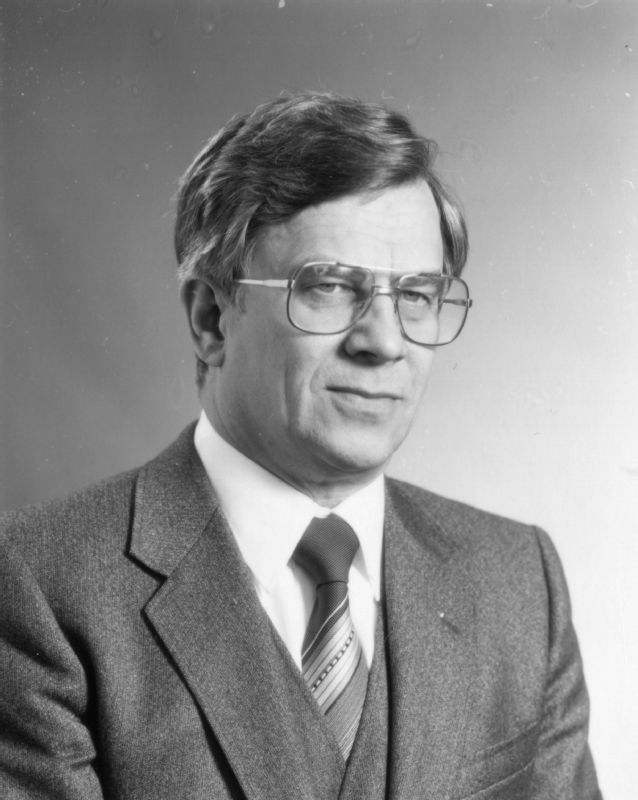
Simo Vuorilehto

Simo Vuorilehto, titled Vuorineuvos, (8 August 1930 – 13 June 2024) was a Finnish businessman who was the chairman and CEO of Nokia Corporation. He became the chairman and CEO in 1988 after the death of Kari Kairamo. In 1990 he was replaced as chairman by Mika Tiivola. He remained CEO until 1992 when he was succeeded by Jorma Ollila. Vuorilehto died on 13 June 2024, at the age of 93.
