= Carl Gustaf von Essen =

Finnish priest (1815–1895)

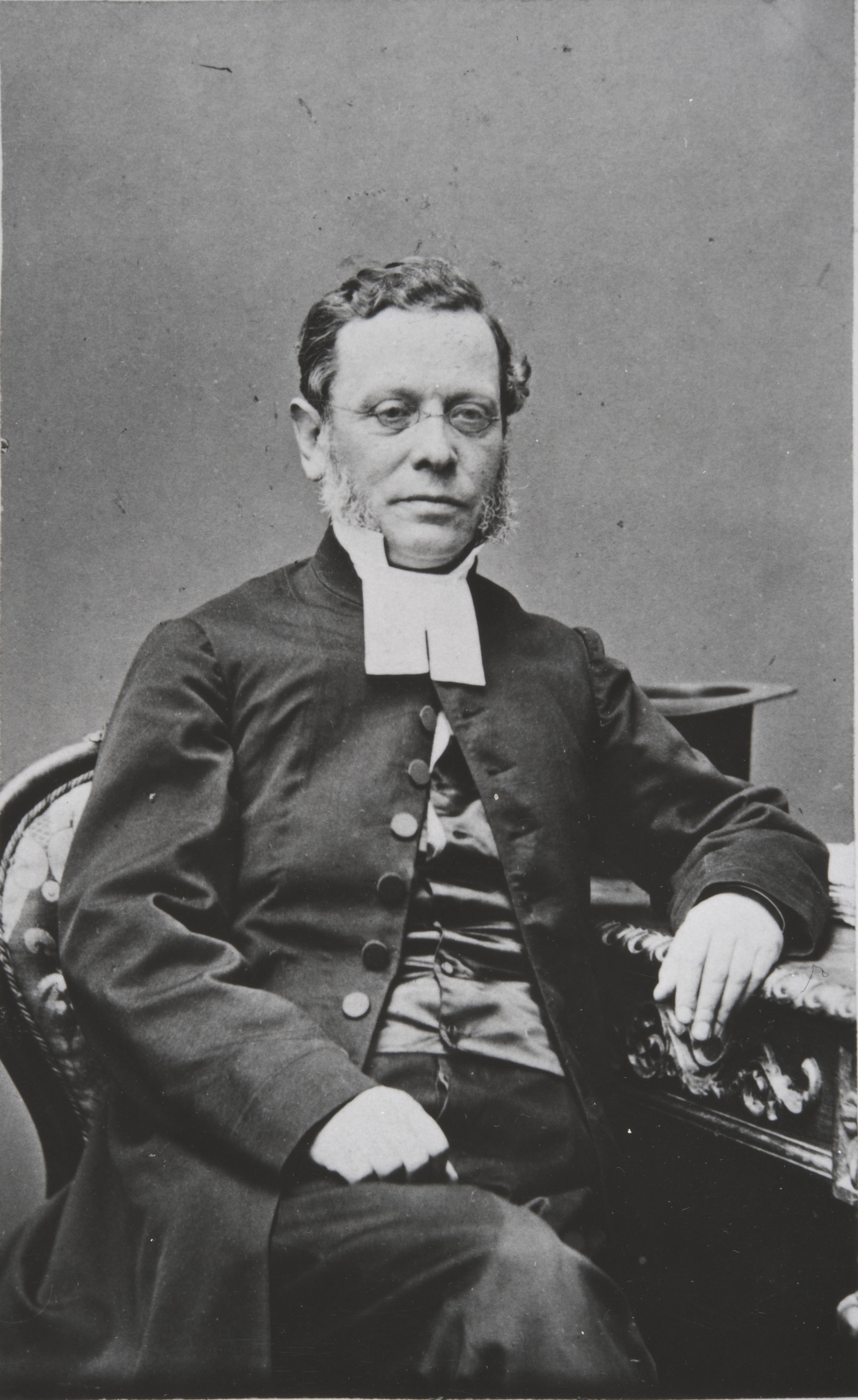
- Born: 20 March 1815; Oravais, Grand Duchy of Finland
- Died: 22 July 1895 (aged 80); Hiitola, Grand Duchy of Finland
- Education: PhD, theology
- Title: professor
- Movement: Pietism
- Opponent: Nils Gustaf Malmberg
- Spouse: Katalina Sofia née Arppe
- Children: Lydia, married Bergroth (1842–1872); Hanna (1843–1844); Mikael (1845–1905); Elina (1847–1950); Gertrud (1849–1898); Edvard (1850–1912)
- Parent(s): Otto Mauritz von Essen and Brita Christina née Thodén

Carl Gustaf von Essen (20 March 1815 – 22 July 1895) was a Finnish Pietistic priest.

Essen got into influence of Pietism at an early age. He studied theology but his views which differed from the official line of the church delayed his ordination.

As a priest, Essen was an active member in the Pietistic movement. In the early 1850s he got into doctrinal conflict with the leader of the movement Nils Gustaf Malmberg and got closer to the official church.

Essen took part in development of the Finnish hymnal, both in Finnish and Swedish, and he represented Estate of Clergy in Diet of Finland.

Later Essen worked as university professor of theology.

== Early life and studies ==
Essen was born in Oravais, Vaasa Province. His parents were lieutenant Otto Mauritz von Essen and Brita Christina née Thodén. Essen got the first influence of Pietism from a well-known preacher, Jonas Lagus. He did his matriculation exam in 1830. Essen went to study theology and in 1837 he graduated Bachelor of Theology. When he continued his studies he formed a group of university Pietists with Lars Stenbäck and Julius Immanuel Bergh. During 1839–1840 they published Pietistic newspaper called Evangeliskt Veckoblad. Consequently, officials and church became suspicious towards Essen and Porvoo Cathedral Chapter refused giving him ordination in 1838. But after Essen graduated Master of Theology in 1840 with excellent grades, the Turku Cathedral Chapter decided to ordinate him.

== Career ==
=== Clerical career ===
Essen started his clerical career working as priest in west Uusimaa. Later he moved to Ostrobothnia to Ylihärmä and Ilmajoki where Pietism was in upswing. He took actively part in the movement. He criticised strongly new church order proposal of 1847, proposed by Johan Jakob Nordström; according to Essen it included such elements of hierarchy which the Pietistic movement could not accept.

=== Doctrinal conflicts ===
Since the early 1850s Essen began to criticise Pietism, and especially its leader Nils Gustaf Malmberg. The internal schism in the movement led to a split; Essen and many other young priests adopted Johann Tobias Beck's theology, that represented Tübingen school. The influence had been brought to Finland by Alfred Kihlman. Subsequently, Essen's views approached to those of the traditional Lutheran church and participated in hymnal committee of the Finnish and Swedish-speaking versions. He evaluated J. L. Runeberg's hymnal version together with Kihlman and gave a positive assessment.

=== Political career ===
Essen participated in Diet of Finland in 1863–1864 and 1872 representing Estate of Clergy. In 1876 he took part in the first synod of Finland. He was also a member in number of governmental committees.

=== University career ===
Essen got doctorate in 1864 and in 1867 he made dissertation to get a position as professor of practical theology. His thesis is about confession and it includes a lot of influence from Beck; according to Essen, only a private penance is scripturally correct. Carl Gustaf von Essen worked as a professor until 1875, after which he moved for retirement to Herniäinen estate in Hattula.

== Family ==
Essen was married to Katalina Sofia née Arppe (1806–1894) in 1841. Their children were Lydia, married Bergroth (1842–1872), Hanna (1843–1844), Mikael (1845–1905), Elina (1847–1950), Gertrud (1849–1898) and Edvard (1850–1912).

== Bibliography ==
- Anmärkningar vid förslag till kyrkolag för storfurstendömet Finland (1847)
- Förslag till svensk psalmbok för de evangeliskt-lutherska församlingarna i Finland granskadt (together with Alfred Kihlman; 1862)
- Om bikt och avlösning (1867)
