= Mika Tiivola =

Finnish bank manager, bank director and minister

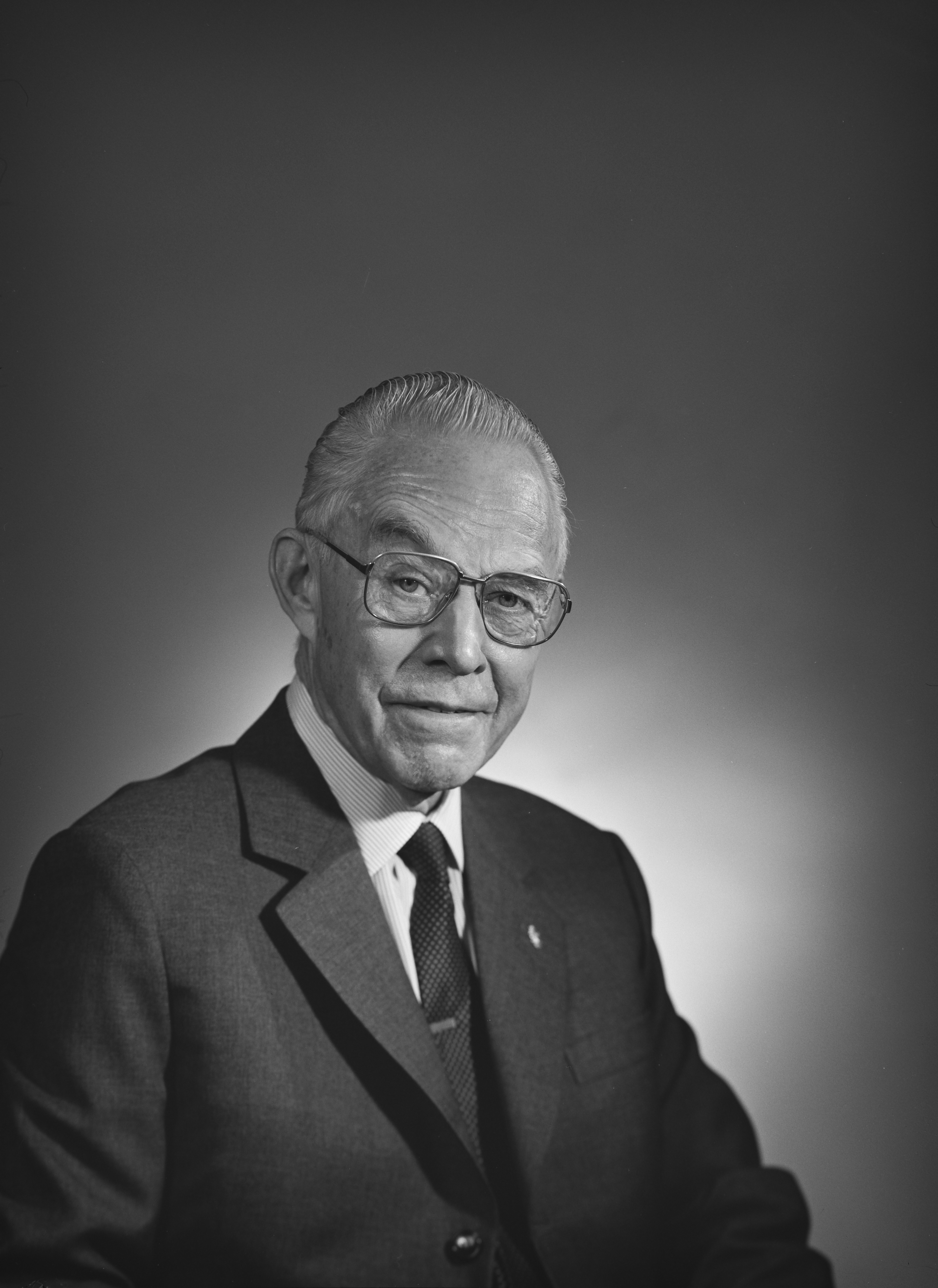
Mika-Tiivola-1992

Carl Mikael Augustinus ”Mika” Tiivola (30 November 1922 – 13 April 1994) was a Finnish businessman. He was the former CEO of the former Finnish bank Union Bank of Finland (SYP). He was the Chairman of Nokia Corporation when SYP was its largest owner in the 1980s.

Business positions
Preceded by Göran Ehrnrooth	Union Bank of Finland CEO; 1970–1989	Succeeded by Ahti Hirvonen
Preceded by Björn Westerlund	Nokia Corporation Chairman; 1979–1986	Succeeded by Kari Kairamo
Preceded by Simo Vuorilehto	Nokia Corporation Chairman; 1990–1992	Succeeded by Casimir Ehrnrooth
