= Maarit Toivanen =

Finnish business executive (born 1954)

Vuorineuvos Maarit Toivanen
- Born: 27 December 1954 (age 70); Helsinki, Finland
- Occupation: Business executive
- Parent(s): Erkki J. Toivanen (father), Anja née Auriala (mother)

Maarit Toivanen (previously Toivanen-Koivisto; born 27 December 1954) is a Finnish business executive and investor, notable for being only the second woman to receive Finland's highest civilian honorary title of vuorineuvos.

== Early life and education ==
Maarit Toivanen was born in Helsinki as the youngest daughter of the family owning the Finnish building materials wholesaler Onninen, which had been set up in 1913 by her great-grandfather, Alfred Onninen.

She was raised in the upmarket Ullanlinna district of Helsinki, and was privately educated, graduating from the Mannerheimintien Yhteiskoulu secondary school in 1973.

Following some post-secondary business studies in Finland, Toivanen went on to study economics and finance at Uppsala University in Sweden, graduating in 1978.

== Business career ==
After her studies, Toivanen joined the family business, and over the years worked in various functions including sales, purchasing, product management, quality and finance.

Following the death in 2000 of her father, Erkki J. Toivanen, who had run the business for 35 years, Maarit Toivanen took on the role of Chairperson of Onninen, as well as CEO of its parent group Onvest. She represented the fourth generation of her family to run the business, and continued to do so until the sale of most of the group operations to Kesko in 2016 for a reported EUR 369 million.

In addition to the family business, Toivanen has served in Board roles at several notable Finnish listed companies, including Neste, Itella and Rautaruukki, as well as in a number of cultural and civic organisations such as Sibelius Academy and Alvar Aalto Museum.

== Honours ==
In 2008, Toivanen was granted the honorary title of vuorineuvos by President Tarja Halonen. She was only the second woman in Finnish history to receive the honour.

In 2011, she was conferred an honorary doctorate in economic sciences by Aalto University.

== Controversies ==
Toivanen caused controversy in 2014, when she announced that she would be moving her and her family's tax domicile to Portugal the following year, in preparation for the impending company sale, in order to avoid Finland's 20% inheritance tax which she considered too high. She returned to Finland in 2018.

In May 2019, Toivanen was issued with a EUR 74,000 speeding ticket, for driving at 112 kilometres per hour (70 mph) in an 80 kilometres per hour (50 mph) speed limit area. The large amount is due to the Finnish 'day-fine' system whereby speeding tickets are not fixed, but depend instead on the offender's income.

== Personal life ==
Maarit Toivanen has been married twice. She has two children from her first marriage. From her second marriage, to Ilkka Koivisto (m. 1994 — div. 2017), she also has two children, as well as two step-children from Koivisto's earlier marriage.
