= Casimir Ehrnrooth =

Finnish businessperson (1931–2015)

Göran Albert Casimir "Casse" Ehrnrooth, titled Vuorineuvos (April 6, 1931 – July 8, 2015), was a Finnish magnate and former chairman of the Nokia Corporation. His business career began in the forest industry, and later he was a director of UPM-Kymmene and Merita-Nordbanken.

The eldest son of the President of Nordic Union Bank, one of the then two biggest banks in Finland, Ehrnrooth inherited substantial holdings in important companies from both his paternal and maternal families. His paternal family were in banking, while his maternal forefathers were founders of Fiskars and Kaukas industries. His earlier family tree includes notable military men. He had a degree in law from Helsinki University.

== Kaukas ==
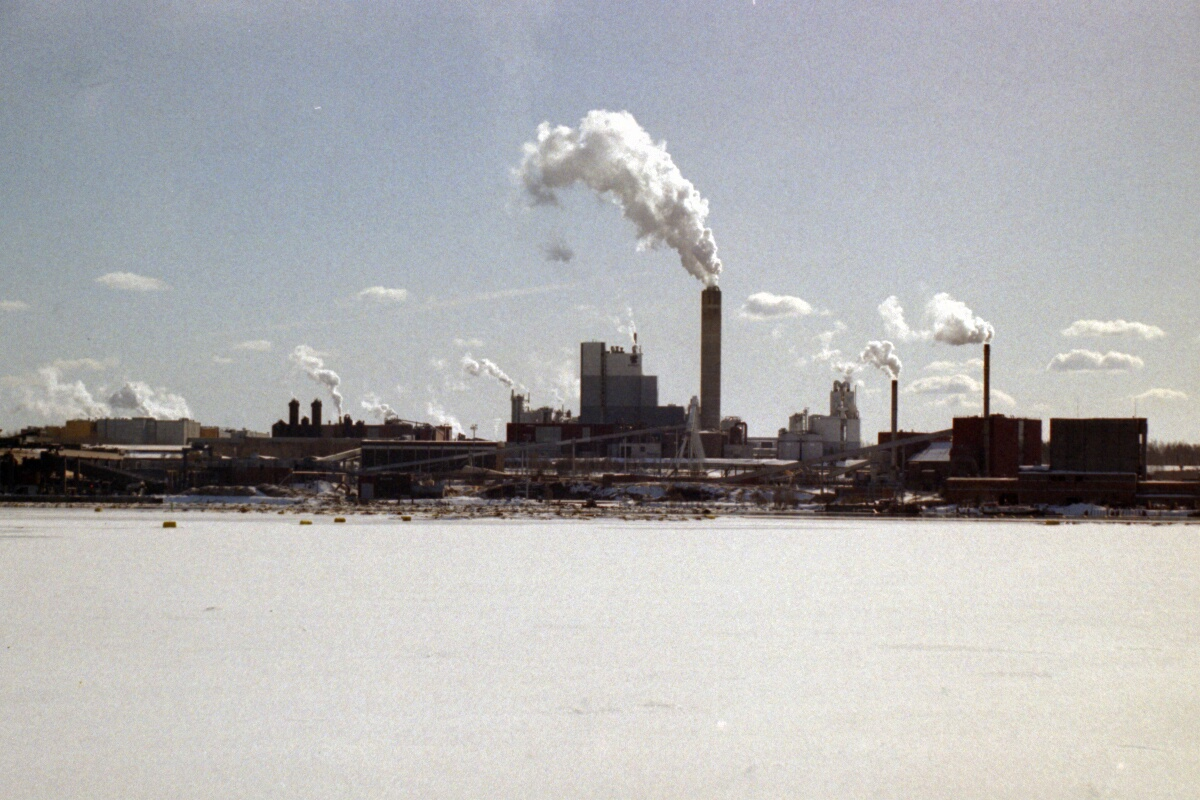
Kaukaa paper factory in Lappeenranta and Saimaa lake

Casimir Ehrnrooth succeeded his maternal relatives as President and CEO of Kaukas paper factory, in small town of Lauritsala (annexed to Lappeenranta in 1967), Southern Karelia in 1962; and he served there for a long time.

Casimir Ehrnroth was successor of Jacob von Julin (1906–1987) as CEO of Kaukas paper factory. He was Jacob von Julin’s sister's son. Casimir Ehrnrooth was selected in the Kaukas Board of Directors in 1954 and as CEO in 1967.

In 1985, he arranged the merger between Kymi-Strömberg industrial corporation and his Kaukas, becoming President and Chairman of the new conglomerate, Kymmene Corporation, in which position he served until retirement. As such, Casimir Ehrnrooth was in the late 1980s and early 1990s the top businessman and decision-maker of Finnish forest industry, a branch most important to overall Finnish economy. His influence was felt in several governmental policies of Finland, such as some devaluations of currency.

== Union Bank and Nokia Corporation ==
As side occupation, he also served in the council of Union Bank, and as chairman of Nokia Corporation (1992–1999), a company which just in those years rose to position of a worldwide developer of telecommunications devices.

Ehrnrooth lived in Helsinki retired from daily business. He also owned Vanantaka manor, in Janakkala, Kanta-Häme, Finland.

== Forcit ==
Casimir Ehrnrooth was Forcit Oy Board of Directors chairman in 2003–2009 and was a member in 2012. According to the Supreme Administration Court claims in the case of stone business in Tuusula the stone business is concentrated in Finland. According to the Competition Authorities in Finland (15.2.2010) Forcit produce and import the majority of explosives in Finland, but several foreign companies are competing. Forcit Oy produce explosives for civil and military use. Explosives are used in mines, rock construction of large buildings, and road and railway construction.

== Death ==
Ehrnrooth died in July 2015 from a sudden cardiac arrest at his home in Mallorca. He was 84 years old.

== Family ==
Casimir Ehrnrooth's father Göran Ehrnrooth (1905–1996) was a bank manager at Pohjoismaiden Yhdyspankki. His mother Louise von Julin came from a rich family. Ehrnrooth has been married twice. His first wife from 1953 to 1964 was Eva Kristina Katarina Reenpää, daughter of Professor Heikki Reenpää, CEO of publishing firm Otava. His second wife since 1965 was Ann-Mari Horelli, daughter of CEO Ingmar Horelli.

His children:

- Henrik Ehrnrooth (1954), owner of Lindvik manor in Jakari, Porvoo; once President and CEO of Jaakko Pöyry Consulting companies
- Johanna Ehrnrooth (1958–2020), painter
- Georg Ehrnrooth (1966), owner of Porlammi manor
- Carl-Gustaf Ehrnrooth (1969), Guggenheim Foundation Board of Directors, part-owner of Vanantaka manor, see Guggenheim Helsinki Plan

== Career ==
Posts held include:

- Petco Oy, CEO 1958–1962
- Kaukas, manager 1962–1967
- Kaukas, CEO 1967–1985

Kaukas merged with Kymi-Strömberg in 1986 and changed its name to Kymmene Oy in 1987

- Kymmene Oy, CEO 1987–1991

UPM-Kymmene was formed by the merger of Kymmene Corporation and Repola Ltd and its subsidiary United Paper Mills Ltd in 1996

- Chairman of ex Confederation of Finnish Industries 1988–1991

Member of the Board of Directors of:

- Finvest, chairman 1997–2003
- EQ Online, chairman 2000–2001
- Forcit Oy, chairman 2003–2009
- Cargotec, vice chairman 2005–2009, chairman 2009–

Business positions
Preceded by Mika Tiivola	Nokia Corporation Chairman; 1992–1999	Succeeded by Jorma Ollila
