= Day-fine =

Financial punishment

A day-fine, unit fine or structured fine is a pecuniary sanction which is based on the severity of the offence as well as the income (or wealth) of the offender.

The fine amount is calculated by determining the number of days based on the severity of the violation—the more severe the violation, the greater the number of days imposed. The daily unit, which represents how much is paid per day, is a standardized portion of an individual's daily income, ensuring equal proportional impact across all offenders. The total fine is the product of the number of days and the daily unit.

The rationale behind this type of fine is to create a fining system which equalises the burden of the punishment on the offenders, irrespective of their income. It has been introduced in different countries for a variety of reasons: to replace a short-term imprisonment sentence, to make the fining system more fair across different income groups, to enhance deterrence.

The day fine system is practiced already in around half of the European countries, and in some additional jurisdictions around the world. Among those jurisdiction are Denmark (Danish: dagbøde), Estonia (Estonian: päevamäär), Finland (Finnish: päiväsakko), France (French: Jour-amende), Germany (German: Tagessatz), Portugal (Portuguese: Astreinte), Sweden (Swedish: dagsbot), Switzerland, and Macau (Chinese: 刑法典).

== Example countries ==
=== Germany ===
Germany has imposed day fines since 1969. Day fines are used for convictions under the criminal code (Geldstrafe), while administrative fines (Geldbuße), such as for minor traffic infractions, usually use fixed amounts.

=== Denmark ===
Violations of the Danish Penal Code may be punishable by up to 60 day-fines, when the severity of a crime does not call for a custodial sentence.

Fines issued under other laws (e.g. the traffic code) are not day-fines and do not ordinarily scale. Exceptions include fines for driving under the influence or without a valid license, which (although not technically day-fines) scale with income. Fines that do not scale may still be reduced by half (to a minimum of DKK 500) for offenders who are under 18 or whose gross annual income does not exceed DKK 171,795 (as of 2020).

=== Finland ===
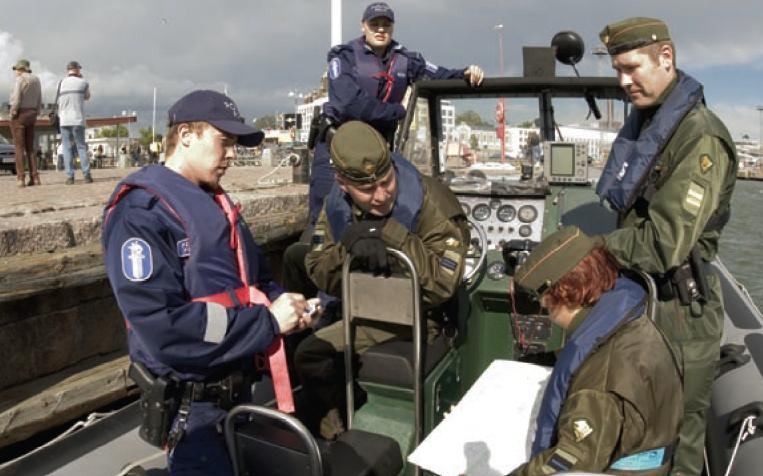
Both police and the Finnish Border Guard can make a formal demand for fining a person or order a petty fine.

In Finland, the day-fine system is used for most crimes that are punishable by way of a fine. The system has been in use since 1921. Most minor infractions are punished with a fixed petty fine (rikesakko, ordningsbot) such as minor traffic and water traffic violations, littering, and breaches of public peace. A petty fine is summarily ordered by the police officer if the suspect does not contest his guilt, but the person punished may contest the fine in a district court.

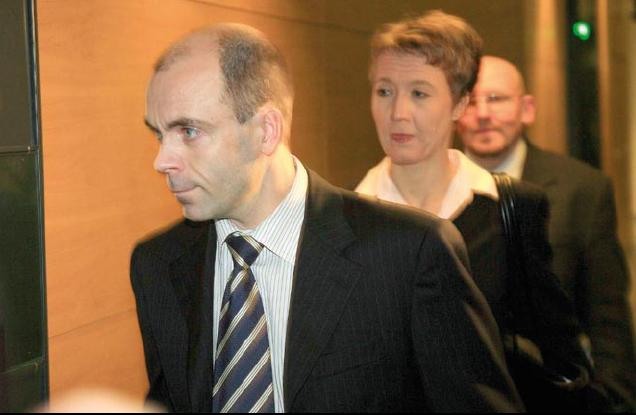
Finnish prosecutors have considerable judicial power in deciding fines. Here, prosecutors are arriving at a court of law.

Most infractions are punishable with a day-fine. For crimes warranting no more than six months in prison, the fine may be summarily ordered by the prosecutor if the suspect does not want the court to handle the case. The process of ordering a day fine is started by a police officer who makes a formal demand for the suspect to be fined. The suspect has one week to contest the demand. If the suspect does not contest the demand, the prosecutor may order a fine which may not be higher than demanded by the police officer. If the suspect contests the demand, the case may be taken to the district court if the prosecutor considers the suspect guilty. If the prosecutor considers the case to merit a term in prison or a higher fine, the case is always taken to the court. If the prosecution or the injured party do not demand a higher punishment than a fine, the district court has a quorum with a single member. The fine is paid to the bank using a giro. A fine ordered in Finland is executable in any European Union member country.

A Finnish fine consists of a minimum of 1 day-fine, up to a maximum of 120 day-fines. If several crimes are punished together, 240 day-fines may be sentenced. The fines may not be sentenced together with a prison sentence, unless the prison sentence is probational. The minimum amount of a day-fine is 6 euros. Usually, the day-fine is one half of daily disposable income. The daily disposable income is considered to be one 60th part of the person's monthly mean income during the year, after taxes, social security payments and a basic living allowance of €255 per month have been deducted. In addition, every person for whose upkeep the fined person is responsible decreases the amount of daily fine by €3. The income of the person is calculated on the basis of the latest taxation data. For speeding in traffic, however, the fine is at least as high as the petty fine, i.e. €115.

The person who is punished with a fine is responsible for giving accurate information concerning their income. Lying about one's income (Finnish: sakkovilppi, Swedish: bötesfusk) is a crime punishable with a fine or up to three months in prison. The police can, however, access the taxation data of Finnish citizens and permanent residents via a real-time datalink, so the chance of lying successfully is minor. There is no maximum day-fine, which may lead to considerably high fines for high-income persons. For example, in 2001, a Finnish businessman with a yearly income of 10 million euros, received a relatively mild punishment of six day-fines, amounting €26,000, for driving though a red traffic light. In 2009 a businessman was fined €112,000 for travelling at 82 kilometres per hour in an area with a speed limit of 60 kilometres per hour. In 2019, Maarit Toivanen, a business executive, was fined €74,000 for driving at 112 kilometres per hour (70 mph) in an 80 kilometres per hour (50 mph) speed limit area. As speeding is punished with a petty fine if the offender is exceeding the speed limit by up to 20 km/h, but with a day-fine if exceeding the limit by 21 km/h or more, the monetary amount of the fine can increase from €115 to over €100,000 although the actual change in speed is less than 1 km/h. This has given rise to some criticism, most vividly expressed by a Finnish member of parliament, avid motorist Klaus Bremer and other MPs of right-wing parties.

The fines are subject to recovery proceedings. If the fines are still not paid, the court may convert them to a prison sentence. Three day-fines will be converted to one day of imprisonment, ignoring the remainder for any amount of day-fines not divisible by three, and the length of the sentence must be between 4 and 60 days. This "conversion punishment" (Finnish: muuntorangaistus, Swedish: förvandlingsstraff) is only ever applied to court-ordered fines, not those issued by police.

=== Macau ===
Article 45 of the Penal Code (Chinese: 刑法典, Portuguese: Código Penal) specifies that a criminal fine (Chinese: 罰金, Portuguese: pena de multa) shall normally be at least 10 days and at most 360 days. One day-fine costs at least 50 Macanese patacas and at most 10,000 patacas. A court of law imposes the fine based on the economic and financial situations and personal burdens of a convict.

=== Sweden ===
In Sweden, fines can be set both as an absolute amount or as day fines. Day fines were introduced in 1931. Swedish day fines have, contrary to its Finnish counterparts, a maximum limit so as not to render too excessive of a fine should the offender have a very large income.

=== Switzerland ===
Since 2007 Switzerland has day-fines, which were introduced mostly to replace short prison sentences.

=== United Kingdom ===
England and Wales experimented with the system for a short period from 1992 to 1993. It was unpopular with both magistrates and the general public, and was soon abandoned. The scheme was replaced by requirements that magistrates consider an offender's means when imposing a fine, just not according to a mathematical formula.

=== United States ===
The New York Times reported on an experiment with day fines which took place in 1988 in Staten Island, which was a partnership between the local courts and District Attorney, and the Vera Institute of Justice. In addition to Staten Island, day fines experiments have also been piloted in Maricopa County, Arizona; Bridgeport, Connecticut; Polk County, Iowa; four counties in Oregon; and Milwaukee, Wisconsin. An additional project was set up for Ventura County, California, but never ultimately implemented. According to the National Center for Access to Justice, Oklahoma is the only state in the U.S. that "has taken one or more specific steps to mandate, encourage or facilitate courts' use of individualized fines ('day fines') that are scaled according to both the severity of the offense and the individual's economic status."

== See also ==
- Criminal justice financial obligations, the system of criminal financial punishment typically used by jurisdictions within the United States.
