= Edvin Bergroth =

Finnish engineer, businessman and vuorineuvos

Vuorineuvos Edvin Leonard Bergroth
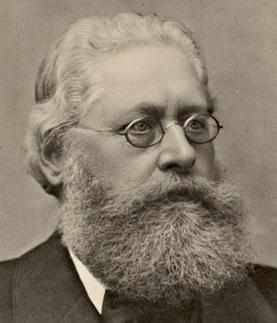
- Born: 26 December 1836; Pihlajavesi, Grand Duchy of Finland, Russian Empire
- Died: 29 March 1917 (aged 80); Helsinki, Grand Duchy of Finland, Russian Empire
- Education: Hannover Polytechnic School
- Board member of: Helsinki Carpenter School (1870–); Nokia Ab (1890–1913); Ironmills' Accident Insurance Company (1897–1912); Finnish Paper Industry Accident Insurance Company (1897–1912); City of Helsinki Illumination Works (1899–1907); Billnäs Ironmill (1902–1913); Finnish Industrialists' Mutual Fire Assistance Association (1904–1915); Tampere Linen and Iron Industry (1905–1915); Higher Swedish Business Institute
- Spouse(s): 1964–1872: Lydia née von Essen (1842–1872); 1876→: Eveleina née Bergroth (1851–1880)
- Children: Einar Ossian (1865–1887); Naomi, married de la Chapelle (1867–1907); Verna Lydia (1868–1868); Ingrid, married Cedercreutz (1869–1961); Torsten Lennart (1870–1872); Karl Sigurd (1871–1875); Werner (1872–1872); Gunnar (1876–1960)
- Parent(s): Johan Mikael Bergroth and Ebba Lovisa née Cajanus
- Awards: vuorineuvos (1907)

Manager of Hietalahti Shipyard and Engineering Works
- In office 18 November 1895 – 1900
- Succeeded by: Adolf Engström

Edvin Leonard Bergroth (26 December 1836 – 29 March 1917) was a Finnish engineer and businessman who played a prominent role in the development of Finnish industry during the late 19th and early 20th centuries. Trained in Hannover, he held leading positions in companies ranging from the Helsinki Gas Illumination Company to the Hietalahti Shipyard and Engineering Works and the oil giant Branobel in the Caucasus. As chairman of the Tampere Linen and Iron Industry (Tampella), he led a period of major industrial expansion. In recognition of his contributions to Finnish economic life, he was awarded the honorary title of vuorineuvos in 1907.

== Early life and studies ==
Edvin Bergroth was born and spent the early years of his life in Pihlajavesi, where his father Johan Mikael Bergroth served as chaplain. His mother was Emma Lovisa née Cajanus. Bergroth's father died when he was just six years old. In 1845, Bergroth began his schooling in Vasa (Vaasa). He later continued his studies in Vasa Gymnasium, which was temporarily relocated to Jakobstad following the great fire of 1852 which devastated Vasa. He completed his matriculation exam in 1857. Although he was qualified for university studies, Bergroth preferred practical work and sought to pursue engineering. During his time in school, he gained experience in mechanical workshops, first in the workshop at Jakobstads realskolan and later in Helsinki in 1857–1858.

In 1858, Bergroth received a state scholarship of 300 rubles to continue his studies abroad. He enrolled at the Hannover Polytechnic School in Prussia (now Leibniz University Hannover) to study engineering. He worked during school breaks in railway workshops, helping to repair and assemble locomotives. Bergroth graduated from the Polytechnic School in 1860.

== Career in Hannover, Helsinki and Caucasus ==
After completing his studies in Hannover in 1860, Edvin Bergroth returned to Helsinki and was employed by the Finnish State Railways. His early tasks included both drawing work and assembling the workshop’s machinery. He was also responsible for lowering the railway bridge over the Vantaa River by two feet.

Helsinki was planning to establish a mint for Finland, and in mid-1861, Bergroth was appointed foreman for the new facility. To prepare for this role, he returned to Hannover and worked at the Royal Prussian Mint for four months. However, the mint project in Helsinki was indefinitely postponed and Bergroth resumed to work for the state railways. Bergroth managed the construction of Leppäkoski railway bridge, which was completed in January 1862.

Shortly afterwards, Edvin Bergroth was appointed technical Manager of Helsinki Gas Illumination Company. The company operated as a private monopoly, having been granted in 1860 an exclusive permit to supply gas lighting in Helsinki until 1900, in areas where it had built the network. In early February 1862, he traveled to Augsburg and Zürich, where he visited gasworks to study contemporary methods of gas production and distribution.

He remained with the company until 1884, advancing from technical manager to general manager. Alongside his duties in gas production, he also oversaw the company's mechanical workshop, which expanded its operations beyond the gasworks and earned a reputation for high-quality technical work.

In 1884, Bergroth accepted a position with Branobel, the oil company founded by the Nobel brothers, and moved to Baku in the Caucasus region of the Russian Empire. He served as the company's technical director and later as site manager, overseeing operations at a time when Baku was emerging as a major global center of oil production. Bergroth remained with Branobel until 1890.

Bergroth returned to Finland in 1890 and went on to work for several companies. Until 1892, he served as an inspector for the Finnish Sawmills Fire Assistance Association. One of his longer-term roles was with Nokia, where he was employed from 1890 to 1913. Over time, Bergroth earned a strong reputation as a capable businessman.

When Hietalahti Shipyard and Engineering Works was re-established after bankruptcy on 18 November 1895, Bergroth was selected its first manager. Under his leadership, the company expanded its premises and invested heavily on facilities and machinery. Despite limited capital and challenging market conditions, his management was regarded as successful. He stepped down from the role in 1900 but remained on the company’s board thereafter.

By the 1880s, the City of Helsinki had become increasingly dissatisfied with Bergroth’s former employer, the gas illumination company, which had failed to invest in modern lighting technologies and continued to produce gas inefficiently by burning wood. In November 1899, the city took over gas distribution and established a municipal gas utility. Bergroth was appointed to the board of the newly formed City of Helsinki Illumination Works.

== Tampere Linen and Iron Industry ==
In 1905, Bergroth was appointed to the board of the Tampere Linen and Iron Industry Company (later known as Tampella), and in the following year, he was elected chairman. Under his chairmanship, the company underwent significant modernization, much of it driven by Bergroth's initiative. The company invested on new buildings and machinery for linen production, increasing both capacity and productivity. During the economic upswing prior to First World War, the company invested on production of various yarn types, canvas, sailcloth and plain weave for bedclothes. The favorable market conditions allowed these developments to continue even during the early years of the war. New facilities were constructed, including a large linen warehouse and an expanded weaving hall. Bergroth left the board in 1915.

== Political career ==
Bergroth was member of Helsinki City Council in 1875–1877, 1880–1882 and 1897–1899. He represented Helsinki bourgeoisie in Diet of Finland in 1882 and 1899. Bergroth took part in number of state committees, Swedish-speaking technical association, voluntary fire brigade activities and charity work.

== Personal life ==
In 1864, Bergroth married Lydia née von Essen, daughter of professor Carl Gustaf von Essen and Catalina Sofia née Arppe. Between 1865 and 1871, they had three daughters and four sons. After Lydia Bergroth's death in 1872, he was married to Evelina née Bergroth, whose parents were vicar Carl Edvard Bergroth and Carolina Amalia née Stenbäck. They had a son in 1876. In total, four of Bergroth's children survived until adult age.

== Sources ==
- Osakeyhtiö Hietalahden Sulkutelakka ja Konepaja – aikaisemmin Helsingfors Skeppsdocka [Hietalahti Shipyard and Engineering Works Limited – formerly Helsinki Shipyard] (in Finnish). Helsinki: Osakeyhtiö Hietalahden Sulkutelakka ja Konepaja. 1935.
