= Turun Sanomat =

Daily newspaper in Finland

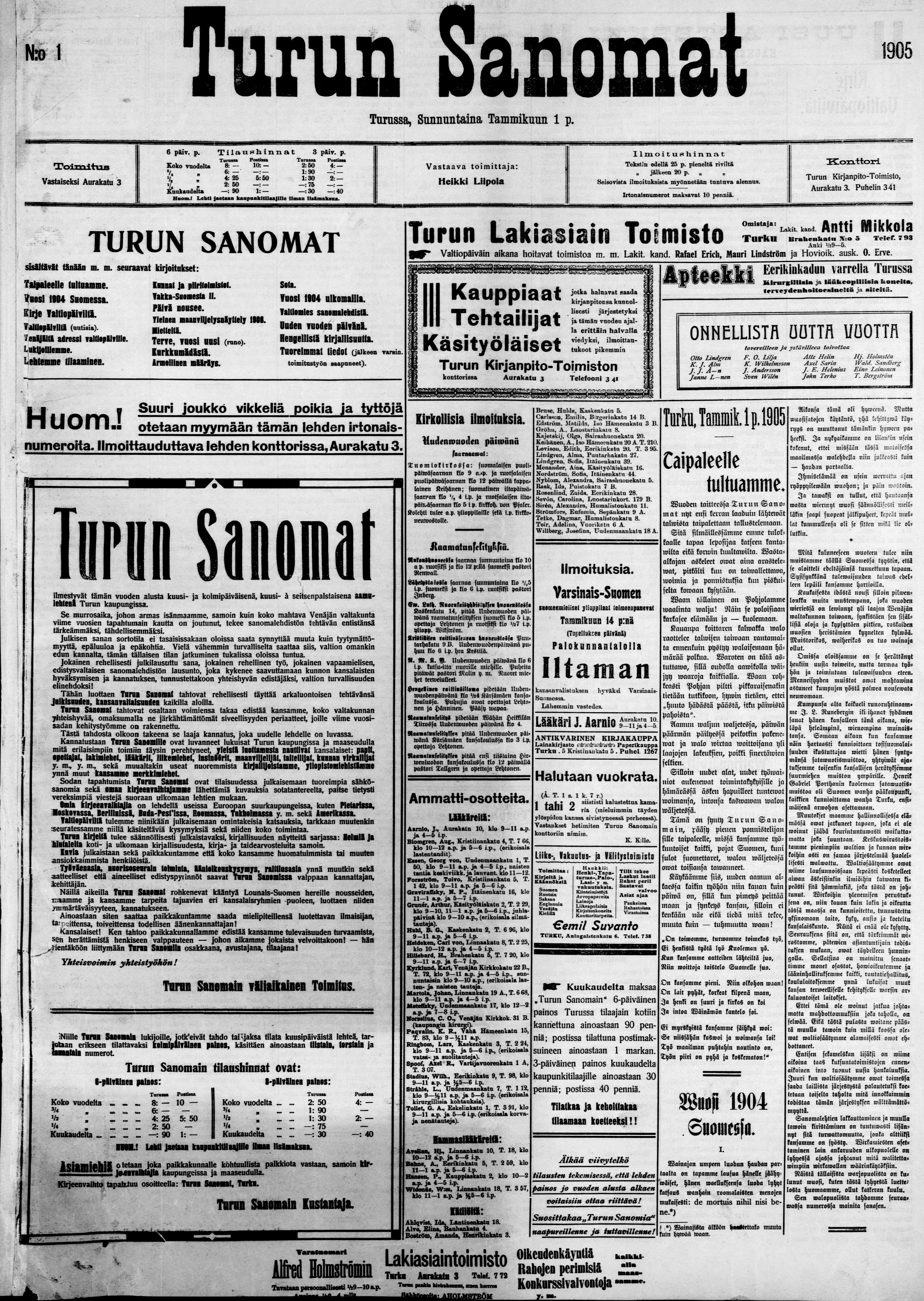
- Front page of Turun Sanomat on 1 January 1905
- Type: Daily newspaper
- Format: Broadsheet
- Owner: TS-Group
- Publisher: TS-Yhtymä group
- Editor: Kari Vainio
- Founded: 1905; 121 years ago
- Political alignment: Neutral
- Headquarters: Turku, Finland
- Circulation: 50,309 (2018)
- ISSN: 0356-133X (print); 1798-9671 (web)
- Website: www.ts.fi

Turun Sanomat is the leading regional newspaper of the region of Southwest Finland. It is published in the region's capital, Turku and the third most widely read morning newspaper in Finland after Helsingin Sanomat and Aamulehti.

== History and profile ==
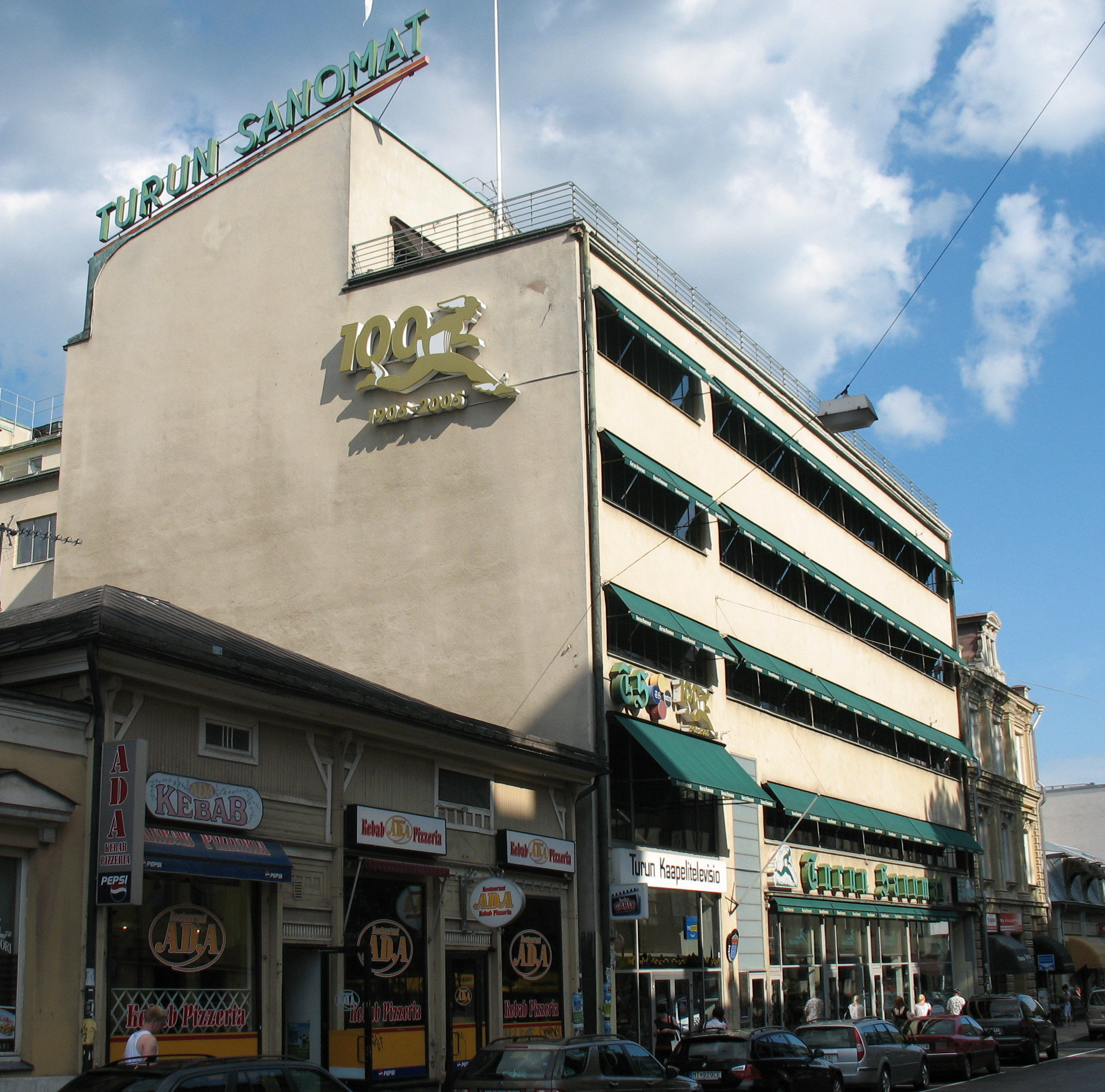
The Turun Sanomat building at Kauppiaskatu in Turku, designed by Alvar Aalto in 1929, housed the newspaper's main office between 1930–2011

Turun Sanomat was launched in 1905 as supporter of the liberal Young Finnish Party. The founder of the paper was Antti Mikkola, a politician and a journalist. It was subsequently owned and managed by Arvo Ketonen and, following his death in 1948, by his widow Irja Ketonen.

Turun Sanomat was one of the conservative papers in the Cold War period. During this period it was one of the Finnish newspapers which were accused by the Soviet Union of being the instrument of US propaganda, and the Soviet Embassy in Helsinki frequently protested the editors of the paper. The paper has been officially politically independent and non-aligned since 1961. It is owned by TS Group. The paper is headquartered in Turku. It is published by TS-Yhtymä group in broadsheet format.

In 1964, Turun Sanomat began to employ computers and new technology in printing, being a pioneer among European newspapers.

Turun Sanomat publishes two weekly supplements, Treffi (on entertainment, and containing the following week's TV programmes) and Extra, the monthly TS Talous (with in-depth economic coverage), and 24 different TS Teema supplements (lifestyle). It also operates its own printing press and the local television channel Turku TV. The current executive editor of Turun Sanomat is Kari Vainio.

== Circulation ==
Turun Sanomat was the fourth largest paper in Finland in 1993 selling 119,004 copies. Its circulation was 115,142 copies in 2001, making it the fifth largest paper in the country. In 2003, the paper sold 110,000 copies and became the fifth best selling newspaper in the country. The 2004 circulation of the paper was 112,567 copies and it was the third best-selling paper in the country. The same year the paper had a readership of 282,000. In 2005, the paper had a circulation of 111,547 copies. It sold 112,360 copies in 2006. The paper had a circulation of 112,419 copies in 2007.

The circulation of Turun Sanomat was 111,845 copies in 2008 and 109,504 copies in 2009. It was 107,199 copies in 2010 and 103,314 copies in 2011. Turun Sanomat was the third most read paper in terms of circulation and sixth largest paper in terms of readership in 2011. The paper sold 99,220 copies in 2012 and 97,289 copies in 2013.

== Literature ==
- Holmberg, Jukka (January 2004). Etusivun politiikkaa Yhteiskunnallisten toimijoiden representointi suomalaisissa sanomalehtiuutisissa 1987–2003.
