= Berndt Grönblom =

Finnish industrialist & vuorineuvos (1885-1970)

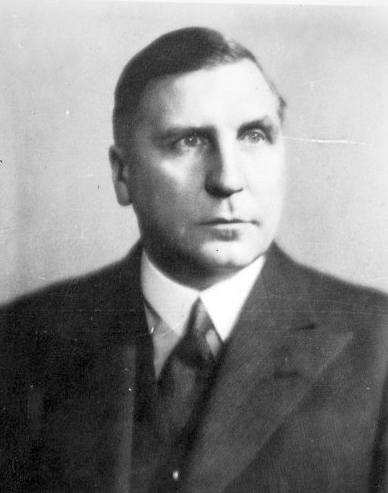
Berndt Grönblom in the 1930s

Berndt Gustaf Grönblom (20 December 1885 – 4 October 1970) was a Finnish industrialist and vuorineuvos.

== Life ==
Grönblom was born in Turku. He received a Master of Science degree in engineering. He received his Mining Counsellor's license in 1918. In 1926 he founded Vuoksenniska Ab Ltd. He received an honorary doctorate from Åbo Akademi University in 1948. He was one of Finland's leading industrialists of his time.

He had an older brother, Edgar Grönblom (fi; 1883–1960) who was a businessman and kauppaneuvos.
