= Göran Ehrnrooth =

Finnish banker (1905–1996)

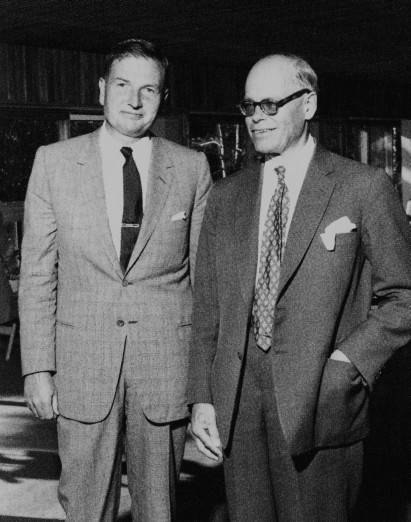
Ehrnrooth (right) and American banker David Rockefeller, 1964

Göran Ehrnrooth (1 April 1905, in Helsinki – 9 January 1996, in Helsinki) was a Finnish banker in Pohjoismaiden Yhdyspankki, a predecessor of Nordea. Ehrnrooth worked for that bank from 1933. He launched the financial services company Mandatum. His successor was Mika Tiivola.

== Industry ==
The family business included the paper and board factory Kaukas and oil business Petko, that was later sold to BP. Investments e.g. in the paper factory Ahlström Oy, Hyvilla and Tampella.

== Family ==
Ehrnrooth was married to Louise von Julin, daughter of Elsa Lovisa Standertskjöld and Jacob von Julin (1881–1942), the CEO of Kaukas paper factory. Their children are Casimir Ehrnrooth (1931–2015), CEO of UPM-Kymmene, Göran J. Ehrnrooth (born 1934), CEO of Fiskars, Robert Ehrnrooth (born 1939), CEO of EFFOA-Suomen Höyrylaiva (Silja Line) and Elsa Margaretha Louise Fromond (born 1942).

He belonged to the Ehrnrooth nobel family.
