= ALMC hf =

ALMC hf.
- Type: Private
- Industry: Banking
- Predecessor: Straumur Investment Bank hf. Hlutabréfasjóðurinn hf.
- Founded: 2010 as ALMC hf 2004 as Straumur; 1986 as Hlutabréfasjóðurinn
- Headquarters: Reykjavík, Iceland
- Area served: Iceland
- Products: investment banking
- Revenue: ▲ISK 2.997 billion (2013)
- Operating income: ▲ISK 415.145 million (2013)
- Net income: ▲ISK 647.239 million (2013)
- Total assets: ▲ISK 17.053 billion (2013)
- Total equity: ▲ISK 1.961 billion (2013)
- Number of employees: 32 (2013)
- Website: www.almchf.com

ALMC hf., formerly Straumur Investment Bank hf. (Icelandic: Straumur Fjárfestingabanki), is a regional investment bank headquartered in Reykjavík, Iceland.

Founded in 1986 as Hlutabréfasjóðurinn and rebranded as Straumur in 2004, the bank initially survived the financial turmoil in late 2008 but was nationalised by The Financial Supervisory Authority of Iceland (FME) on 9 March 2009. Straumur was the last of Iceland's four biggest banks to remain independent during the 2008–2011 Icelandic financial crisis. In the summer of 2010, the bank had been rebranded as ALMC and owned by its creditors. The majority of ALMC's owners are international investors and financial institutions and independent from any state involvement.

Before the collapse of the Icelandic banking system in late 2008 the company was mainly owned by Björgólfur Guðmundsson and his son Björgólfur Thor Björgólfsson. The latter was also the chairman of the board until the bank was temporarily closed by regulators in March 2009. At one point, Straumur was Iceland's largest pure investment bank and the sixth-largest company on the OMX Nordic Exchange in Iceland. Straumur had an established presence in ten countries including the UK, Denmark, Sweden, Finland and the Czech Republic.

== History ==
Straumur was founded in October 1986 as the Equity Fund (Hlutabréfasjóðurinn hf.) – an incentive for individuals in Iceland to invest in shares – and by 2001 it had become an investment company.

Over the next few years, the fund grew rapidly and was merged with a number of other Icelandic investment funds. In 2004, the Icelandic Financial Supervisory Authority approved Straumur's application for a license to operate as a credit undertaking and three more sources of income – brokerage, debt finance and corporate finance – were added to create a more regular flow of income.

In September 2005, Straumur merged with Burdarás, creating Iceland's largest investment bank. The newly merged organisation had a stronger balance sheet and shareholder base and was well positioned to start expanding its activities beyond Iceland.

Straumur-Burdaras, now ALMC, was the largest investment bank in Iceland prior to the 2008 financial crisis, with assets worth roughly EUR 7bn and around 500 employees.

Although the bank initially survived the financial turmoil in late 2008, Financial Supervisory Authority of Iceland (FME) assumed control of Straumur on 9 March 2009. The new owners successfully completed its composition in summer 2010, first of the collapsed Icelandic banks, with over 99% of ALMC's creditors approving the composition. Along with the composition ALMC's creditors approved on founding Straumur Investment Bank. In summer 2011, Straumur became the first entity to get a banking license in Iceland post the financial turmoil in fall 2008.

== Strategic acquisitions ==
July 2006 – Straumur acquired 50.01% share of Stamford Partners, a specialist investment banking firm with operations in London and Amsterdam.

May 2007 – Straumur acquired 62% share in eQ Bank, a Finnish bank specialising in brokerage, asset management and corporate finance.

June 2007 – Straumur acquired 50% share in WOOD & Company, the leading independent investment house in Central and Eastern Europe.

July 2007 – As a result of a public tender offer, Straumur now controls over 95% of shares in eQ.

June 2009 – Straumur acquired West Ham United due to a large debt owed by Björgólfur Guðmundsson, who borrowed a large sum of money from the bank to purchase the club.

January 2010 – Sold 50% of West Ham United to David Gold and David Sullivan for what was thought to be around £50,000,000

May 2010 – Sold a further 10% of West Ham United to current owners Gold and Sullivan

August 2010 – Sold a further 5% of West Ham United to a group of investors including former owner Terry Brown

== Icelandic credit crunch development ==
On 9 March 2009, the Icelandic Financial Supervisory Authority took control of Straumur. The FSA appointed a Resolution Committee which took over all activity of the board of directors. On 27 March, Straumur was closed.

ALMC successfully completed its composition in summer 2010, first of the collapsed Icelandic banks, with over 99% of ALMC's creditors approving the composition.

== Sources ==
- Official Website – http://www.straumur.com
- Quarterly factsheet – Straumur Q3 07 Factsheet
- Annual Report – Straumur 2006 Annual Report
