= Irja Ketonen =

Finnish media executive

Vuorineuvos Irja Ketonen
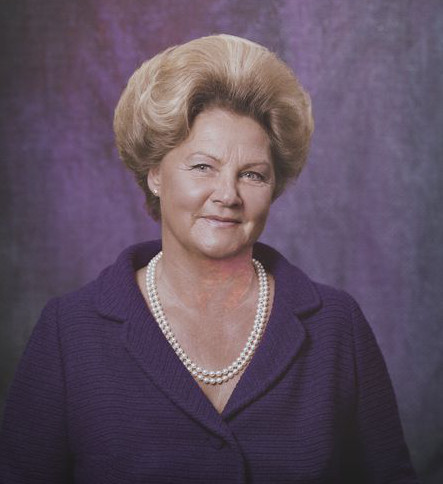
- Born: Irja Helena Blomqvist; 20 June 1921; Turku, Finland
- Died: 17 November 1988 (aged 67); Turku, Finland
- Occupation: Media executive
- Spouse(s): Arvo Ketonen, (m. 1941 – his death in 1948)

Irja Ketonen (née Blomqvist; 20 June 1921 – 17 November 1988) was a Finnish media executive, whose life and career has been described as 'the Cinderella story of the Finnish media sector'. She was the first woman to be granted Finland's highest civilian honorary title of Vuorineuvos.

== Early life ==
Irja Blomqvist was born to a working-class family. She began work at the age of 13, as a gofer in the Turun Sanomat newspaper offices, in which role she stayed for three years, while at the same time finishing her education. Later she was promoted to clerical roles, dealing with administrative matters such as processing mail and advertising. The managing director and editor-in-chief, Arvo Ketonen, saw potential in her, and among other things trusted her with the management of the newspaper's picture archive.

== Marriage ==
Arvo Ketonen's first marriage had ended in 1933, when his wife died leaving no children. In 1941, he caused controversy by marrying his employee, Irja Blomqvist, 30 years his junior.

Consequently, she left her job at the newspaper, and became a homemaker. The couple had four children, born between 1942 and 1946.

In 1945, Arvo Ketonen became ill, and eventually died in 1948, leaving his widow to look after the family business and a young family.

== Leadership ==
Upon her husband's death, and as stipulated in his will, Irja Ketonen assumed management control of the Turun Sanomat operations, at first only temporarily, due to strong resistance by the company's board, and with many doubting her ability to run the business due to her young age and lack of business experience, but nevertheless she returned and remained on permanent full-time basis from 1955.

At the time, it was uncommon for a woman to lead a large business. Under Irja Ketonen’s management, Turun Sanomat expanded into a broader media group and developed into a significant business enterprise within the industry.

In 1981, Ketonen stepped back from the day-to-day running of the newspaper, and instead took on the role of President of the wider TS-Yhtymä media group, which owns Turun Sanomat as well as many other media, printing, logistics and other businesses.

== Honours ==
In 1979, Ketonen was chosen by the Federation of Finnish Enterprises (Suomen Yrittäjät) as their 'Entrepreneur of the Year'.

In 1980, she was granted by President Urho Kekkonen the honorary Finnish title of Vuorineuvos, as the first woman to receive the honour.
