= Georg Ehrnrooth =

Finnish investor (born 1966)

Georg Johan Casimir Ehrnrooth
- Born: January 16, 1966 (age 60)
- Occupation: Investor
- Known for: Major owner of EQ Bank, YIT and Pöyry
- Parent: Casimir Ehrnrooth (father)
- Relatives: Henrik Ehrnrooth (brother); Johanna Ehrnrooth (sister); Carl-Gustaf Ehrnrooth (brother)

Georg Johan Casimir Ehrnrooth (born 16 January 1966) is a Finnish investor. With his brothers, he is the major owner of Finnish HEX exchange stock companies EQ Bank, YIT and Pöyry.

== Family ==
Father Casimir Ehrnrooth (1931–2015) held possessions in banking. Georg's siblings are Henrik (born 1954), Johanna, painter (1958–2020), and Carl-Gustaf (born 1969).

== Business ==
Georg Ehrnrooth owns, with his brothers, investment companies Structor S.A, Corbis S.A. Fennogens Investments S.A. in Luxembourg. These companies are the major owners of EQ Bank, the construction company YIT and the construction and forest industry consulting company Pöyry.

== Fines ==
Georg Ehrnrooth and Jorma Ollila were fined for Luxembourg investments in 2014. Ehrnrooth failed to reveal a Luxembourg-based investment company that he controlled, known as Partum. At the end of 2012, Partum was worth 26 million euros but has since been dissolved. Ehrnrooth told regulators that he had neglected to disclose of the investment company to the insider register in error. In 2016, Yle reported that Georg and Henrik Ehrnrooth own a company in Luxemburg that organize tax haven companies for their customers including Ollila and Kari Stadigh. The company made years cooperation with Mossack Fonseca in Panama.
