= Arvo Ketonen =

Finnish politician

Arvo Mikael Ketonen (19 November 1888 in Uusikaupunki – 27 May 1948) was a Finnish journalist, media executive and politician. He was a Member of the Parliament of Finland from 1939 to 1945, representing the National Progressive Party. His second wife, who followed him in running Turun Sanomat, was Irja Ketonen.
