= Guggenheim Helsinki Plan =

Coordinates: 60°10′01″N 24°58′06″E

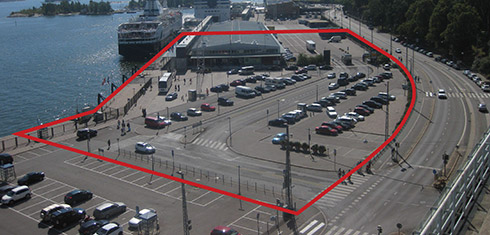
The site of the proposed museum (2014 proposal) at South Harbour, Helsinki

Guggenheim Helsinki Plan was an initiative to establish a Guggenheim museum in Helsinki, Finland. A proposal was introduced to the Helsinki City Council in 2011. After rejection of the initial plan in 2012, a new plan, introduced in 2013, was considered and finally rejected in 2016.

Following the 2011 proposal of a plan by the Solomon R. Guggenheim Foundation for a museum next to South Harbour, Helsinki, a debate was waged among local political and culture activists. The project's construction costs were estimated at 130–140 million euros to be paid by the city of Helsinki and the Finnish State. Guggenheim's license fee for the first 20 years was estimated as 23.4 million euros. Running costs of 14.4 million euros per year would outstrip annual admission fees of only 4.5 million euros. A survey found that 75% of citizens in Helsinki, and 82% of citizens in Vantaa, opposed the project. The Helsinki City Council rejected the plan in 2012. In 2013, Finland's Parliamentary Ombudsman issued a report concluding that Finnish investor and art collector Carl Gustaf Ehrnrooth, a member of the Board of Directors of the Guggenheim Foundation, and Janne Gallen-Kallela-Sirén, director of the Helsinki City Art Museum and a chief exponent of the Guggenheim plan, had conflicts of interest involving the plan and each other.

In September 2013, the Guggenheim Foundation advanced a revised proposal that sought to address the concerns. Operating cost estimates were revised downwards, while revenues were forecast by the Foundation to increase. In 2014, the city board agreed to reserve a new site for a potential museum at Eteläsatama and authorized the Foundation to hold an international architecture competition to design the potential museum. The competition, which was organised by London-based specialists Malcolm Reading Consultants, drew a record 1,715 submissions, and six finalists were announced. In June 2015 the French-Japanese architecture firm Moreau Kusunoki Architectes was selected as the winner. In December 2016, the Helsinki city council rejected the plan.

== Initial proposal ==
In 2009, then-Director of Helsinki City Art Museum, Janne Gallen-Kallela-Sirén, introduced to the city of Helsinki the idea to approach the Solomon R. Guggenheim Foundation in New York regarding establishing a museum in Helsinki that might stimulate tourism. In January 2011 the Guggenheim proposed a plan to the Helsinki City Council. The proposal was for a 12,000 square meter building, with the museum comprising 4,000 square meters. Helsinki would pay the construction costs, estimated as 130–140 million euros, plus the land costs. The museum was planned to be supervised by a board with 4 members from Helsinki and 3 from the Guggenheim. Five to eight exhibitions annually were assumed. The museum would also provide pedagogical and educational programs highlighting Finnish art, architecture and design.

The Guggenheim Foundation persuaded the City Council to commission the Guggenheim Foundation itself, for a fee of 1.15 million euros, to study the feasibility of building the museum for the Foundation, a move that American professor of architecture Peggy Deamer summarized as: "Despite quibbles regarding which entity has more to gain in the marriage—the Guggenheim or Helsinki—there is no speculation about who operates under whose umbrella. This is a purely fiduciary undertaking in which the Guggenheim 'oversees' Finland’s financial performance." Berndt Arell, Director of the National Gallery in Stockholm, Sweden, supported the project and participated in the steering committee of the evaluation. Arell was a director of The Svenska Kulturfonden, which contributed 250,000 euros to support the Guggenheim evaluation. The Finnish Cultural Foundation also supported the project. The feasibility study, presented in January 2012, recommended building the museum in Helsinki’s South Harbor.

The Guggenheim's study was based partly on a survey, made by Boston Consulting Group, estimating the museum's annual attendance at 530,000 visitors, 200,000 more than existing museums. Paavo Arhinmäki, Finland’s Minister for Culture and Sport, and a member of the Helsinki city council, doubted the estimate. The report estimated the museum's running costs at 14.4 million euros annually. An estimated 530,000 annual visitor entry fees would cover 4.5 million euros of these costs. Costs for the city of Helsinki would be 6.8 million euros and for the State of Finland, 700,000 euros annually. Interest costs from the construction loan were expected to be 7.5 million euros annually. The study provoked fears that the Guggenheim Foundation would have all the decision-making power in the Guggenheim Helsinki plan, while the City of Helsinki would retain all of the expenses and risk. Initially, also, there was discussion that Guggenheim Helsinki might not have an independent art collection, but that the collection would be merged with that of the Helsinki City Art Museum. Later, the Guggenheim confirmed that the museum would have its own art collection.

In May 2012, the city council rejected the plan in a narrow vote of 8 against 7, citing the costs of the project, including the Guggenheim's licensing fee of 23.4 million euros, that would have been borne by Helsinki.

=== Conflicts of interest ===
In May 2013, Finland's Parliamentary Ombudsman issued a report concerning conflicts of interest affecting Sirén and Finnish investor and art collector Carl Gustaf Ehrnrooth, who has been a member of the Guggenheim Foundation board since 2008. While serving as director of the Helsinki City Art Museum, Sirén acted on behalf of the city of Helsinki in the preparatory work for the Guggenheim proposal and was also the liaison with the Guggenheim Foundation. During this period, Sirén joined the advisory board of Ekoport Turku Oy, a Finnish oil company chaired by Ehrnrooth, and Sirén’s wife was employed by the oil company. Sirén helped to coordinate both the presentation of the feasibility study on the project and the Guggenheim Foundation's proposal to the City of Helsinki, and he advocated for the museum's plan.

The report found Sirén's impartiality with respect to the project compromised and stated that he should have recused himself from participating in the proposal. Paavo Arhinmäki, who opposed the project, commented that "most decision-makers thought [Sirén] tried to push [the Guggenheim project] very hard". Nevertheless, he called the findings in the report "problematic but minor", saying: "Finland is [such a] small country that it's very difficult to even find people who are not connected with each other." Sirén pointed out that he had been cleared of wrongdoing by an independent investigation by the Helsinki City Council before the report was released. He stated that he had obtained permission from Helsinki's deputy mayor to serve on the Ekoport Turku Oy board and noted that Ehrnrooth did not participate in any consideration or decisions by the Guggenheim Foundation board concerning the Helsinki proposal. In any event, Sirén left the Helsinki City Art Museum in late 2012 to become director of the Albright-Knox Art Gallery in the US.

== 2013 proposal ==
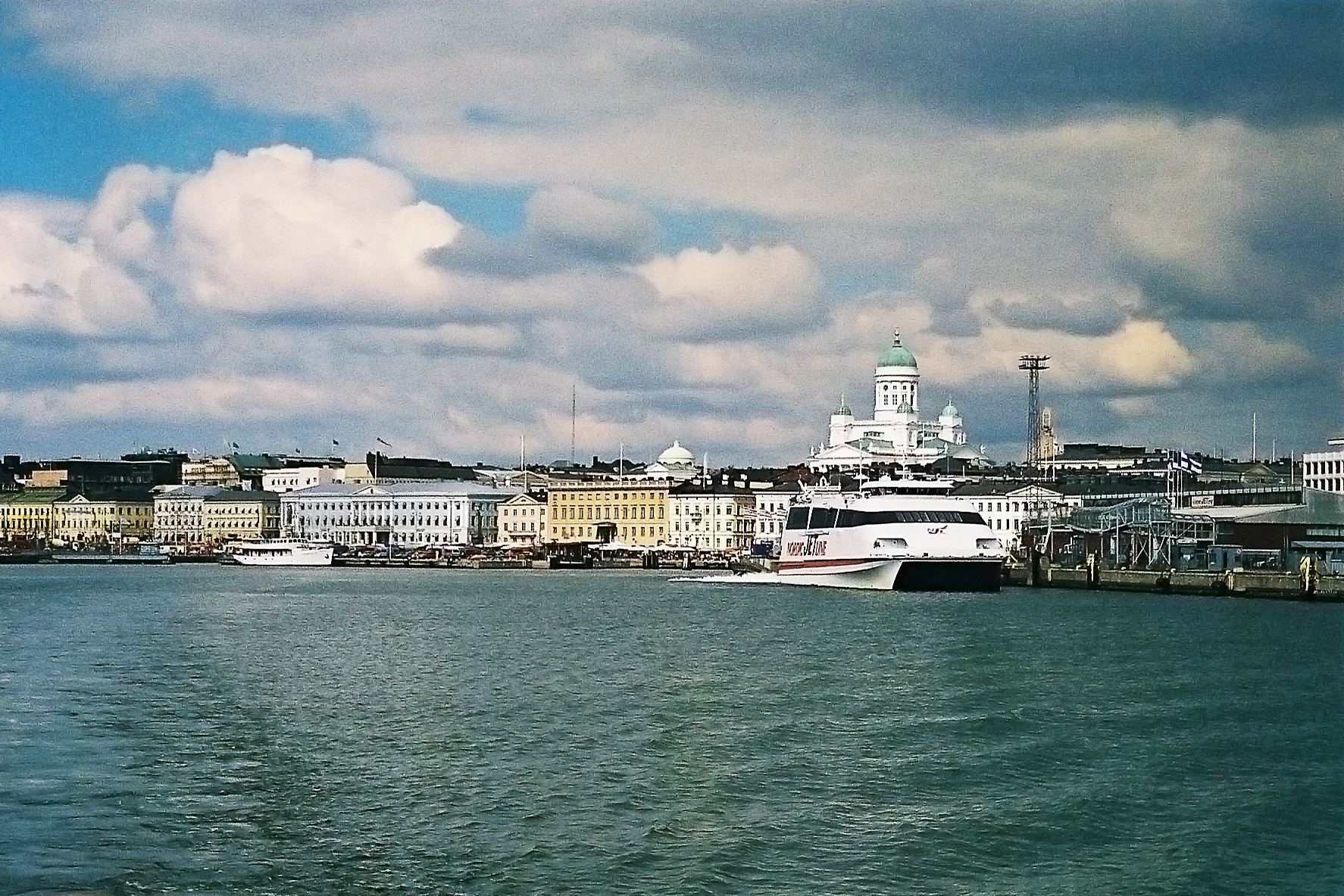
Eteläsatama, the new site of the proposed museum, seen from the bay

In September 2013, the Guggenheim Foundation advanced a revised proposal under which the museum would focus on Nordic and international architecture and design in the context of other forms of modern and contemporary art. Educational programs at the museum would have provided opportunities for children and adults to expand their experience of the visual arts. The project's architect was to be chosen through an international competition. The proposal eliminated the controversial proposed merger with Helsinki Art Museum, although this resulted in the loss of the 700,000 euro government subsidy, and the new museum was envisioned to gradually build up a permanent collection from parts of its exhibitions. The Guggenheim's licensing fee was to be funded by private sources. Operating and administrative costs were estimated at about 10% lower than the original plan, and annual revenues were projected to be slightly higher, with annual visitors estimated at 550,000. Journalist Lee Rosenbaum called the new estimates, again prepared with the assistance of Boston Consulting Group, "speculative at best".

In January 2014, the city council agreed to reserve a site for the potential museum at Eteläsatama (on the other side of the bay from the earlier planned location, and nearer to the city center), and the Guggenheim Foundation was permitted to hold an international architecture competition to design the potential museum, though no decision was then made about whether to proceed with the project. One of the factors cited for considering the new plan was the Guggenheim Foundation's pledge to arrange private funds to pay the licensing fee. Another was that the Helsinki City Art Museum would remain a separate institution. Members of the council stressed that they would make an independent assessment of the costs of the project. Leif Sevón questioned whether the financial support of the Swedish Cultural Foundation for the architectural competition complied with that foundation's rules, because the competition was open to architects outside the Swedish minority in Finland. The foundation's director, however, stated that its board had attached "certain conditions" to the proposed funding.

The architectural competition began in June 2014, and design submissions were accepted until September 10, 2014. The six finalists, out of a record 1,715 competition entries from 77 countries, were announced in December 2014. In June 2015, the French-Japanese architecture firm Moreau Kusunoki Architectes was selected as the winner of the competition. Their design is estimated to cost €130 million to build, with a floor area of 12,100 m^{2} (130,000 sq ft), including 4,000 m^{2} (43,000 sq ft) of exhibition space. It "comprises [a fragmented, non-hierarchical, horizontal campus] of darkly clad pavilions with concave roofs ... linked by a series of garden patios. A lookout tower with a glazed top [rises] from one side of the site to provide views over the city's waterfront. Lights within the tower ... illuminate the tip of the structure at night like a lighthouse." Of the nine pavilions, six would house gallery suites. Critics objected to the dark color of the design's exterior, which contrasts with the surrounding architecture, as well as the shape of the building. Osku Pajamäki, vice chairman of the city’s executive board, said: "The symbol of the lighthouse is arrogant in the middle of the historical center ... [like] a Guggenheim museum next to Notre Dame in Paris. People are approaching from the sea, and the first thing that they will see is that the citizens of Helsinki bought their identity from the Guggenheim." A restaurant was planned to be located in the top of the lighthouse.

== Rejection of plan ==
In December 2016, the Helsinki city council rejected the Guggenheim museum investment with a vote of 53 to 35. Satu Nurmio, a reporter from Yle, concluded that the main reasons for the rejection of the plan were that "the low level of funding pledged by the private sector was an indication that donors did not see it as a viable investment. ... [The] Foundation failed in its bid to use an architectural competition to create a building that the public would fall in love with. The winning entry even aroused a degree of opposition to the museum project. Yet another stumbling block was an operational style in planning by the Solomon R. Guggenheim Foundation that lacked transparency".

== Reaction ==
=== Criticism of the original plan ===
Critics of the original Guggenheim Helsinki Plan, Leena-Maija Rossi, director of Finland’s Cultural Institute in New York, art critic Marja-Terttu Kivirinta and researcher Hanna Johansson, argued that the Guggenheim Foundation would benefit from the project without financial risks. Finland's Minister of Culture Paavo Arhinmäki noted that his ministry had no budget for the proposed museum and that he was already forced to cut funding to other cultural institutions. Therefore, funding for construction of the museum would need to come from new taxes or further drastic cuts in other museums and cultural institutions. Arhinmäki stated that the Helsinki brand is stronger than the Guggenheim brand, and so the museum would benefit the latter more than the former. Jorma Bergholm, a member of the Helsinki City Council, believed that the figures estimated for construction of the museum were 150 million euros too low, overestimated its revenue-earning capacity by 50% and ignored some ongoing expenses. He also pointed out that a commercial building on the museum's site could bring in rental income of nearly 60 million euros.

Statistics expert Aku Alanen calculated that the museum would not be an economical investment for Helsinki with respect to tourism. A March 2012 survey conducted by Finland's largest newspaper, Helsingin Sanomat, showed that 75% of Helsinki residents opposed the project, and 82% of residents in neighbouring Vantaa also opposed the project. A group of more than 100 Finnish artists suggested that the construction funds would be better used to renovate the Helsinki City Art Museum. The Association of Finnish Artists stated that Helsinki museums have had 57 national exhibitions from 2000 to 2012, and the Guggenheim plan would reduce such opportunities for Finnish artists. Tuula Karjalainen, Helsinki City Art Museum director from 1993 to 2001 and Kiasma director from 2001 to 2006, noting that some museums in Helsinki reported loss of customers during the Picasso exhibition at the Helsinki City Museum, wondered what impact the proposed Guggenheim museum would have on other Helsinki museums.

=== Support for the original plan ===
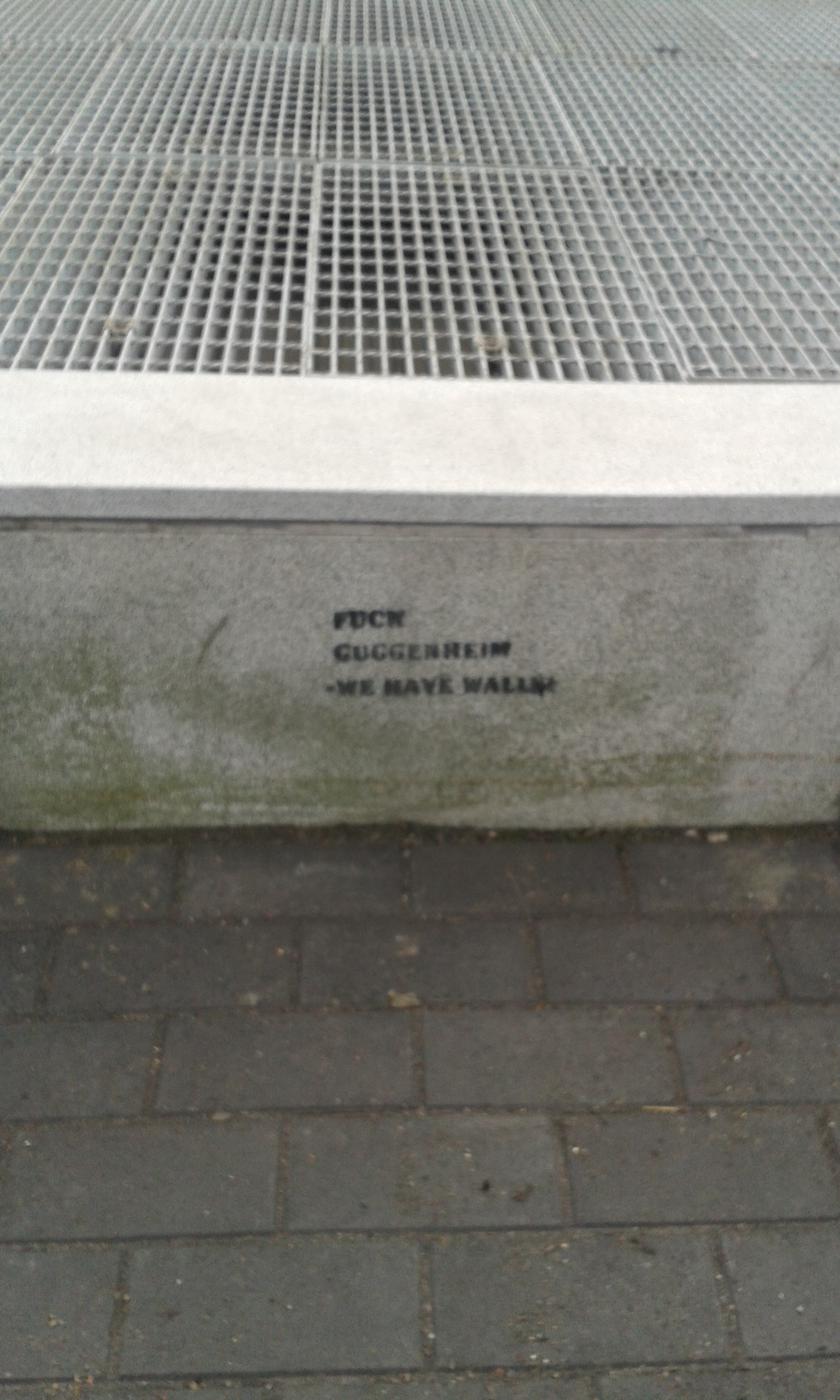
Anti-Guggenheim graffiti campaign, late 2014. The slogan reads "Fuck Guggenheim – We Have Walls".

Helsinki mayor Jussi Pajunen and deputy mayor Hannu Penttilä favored the original proposal, concluding that the museum would be an economic opportunity, based on the estimates of the Boston Consulting Group. Pajunen argued that the museum would "greatly increase tourist interest and strengthen Helsinki as a cultural city". Another deputy mayor, Tuula Haatainen, said: "By giving artists, designers and architects access to major international networks, and by promoting new types of conversations of the arts, a Guggenheim Museum in Helsinki would offer global exposure and unprecedented opportunities to practitioners in the field of visual culture in Finland as well as in the Baltic and Nordic regions in general."

Prime Minister Jyrki Katainen saw the museum as a good long-term investment and believes that it would promote the export of Finnish art, including the display of Finnish art works in other Guggenheim museums. He suggested that the museum would reinforce "appreciation for Finnish design, education, and culture around the world [and promote] increased tourism", although he emphasized that the decision belonged to the City of Helsinki rather than to the Finnish government. Jan Vapaavuori, Finland's Minister of Economic Affairs, also supported the proposal.

=== Later reactions ===
In 2013, Defence Minister Carl Haglund told public broadcaster YLE that he welcomed the Guggenheim's continued interest in the project. Mayor Pajunen continued his support for the museum, saying that it would "greatly increase tourist interest and strengthen Helsinki as a cultural city." In February 2014, Lars-Göran Johnsson, founding member of Kiasma's Friends, and Albert de la Chapelle, Academy of Finland, wrote an op-ed in Hufvudstadsbladet, a Swedish-language newspaper, arguing that a Guggenheim museum is needed Finland's capital. They reasoned that all of the Nordic capitals, except for Helsinki, have internationally known museums that present Western art movements from the 20th century.

The project was promoted by Finnish conservatives but opposed by liberals and the underfunded Finnish arts community. As the architectural competition heated up, critics called the proposed museum "a misguided vanity project, and a symbol of the Finnish capital selling out to an American brand", and a group of independent arts organisations launched a rival competition to "attract innovative ideas about how to more fully meet the city’s cultural, spatial and sustainability needs." The 2014 book In the Shadow of Guggenheim critically analyzed the plan and its projected effect on city finances. Critics noted that the estimated attendance figures exceed those of the Modern Museum in Stockholm, Sweden. Supporters countered that the museum would create nearly 500 jobs and an estimated 800 construction jobs, according to the Boston Consulting Group.
