= Johanna Ehrnrooth =

Finnish painter (1958–2020)

- Born: 23 June 1958; Helsinki, Finland
- Died: 26 May 2020 (aged 61); Helsinki, Finland
- Occupation: Painter

Johanna Ehrnrooth (June 23, 1958 – May 26, 2020) was a Finnish painter.
