= History of Nokia =

History of the Finnish corporation

Nokia is a Finnish multinational corporation founded on 12 May 1865 as a single paper mill operation. Through the 19th century the company expanded, branching into several different products. In 1967, the Nokia corporation was formed. In the late 20th century, the company took advantage of the increasing popularity of computer and mobile phones. However, increased competition and other market forces caused changes in Nokia's business arrangements. In 2014, Nokia's mobile phone business was sold to Microsoft.

== 19th century ==
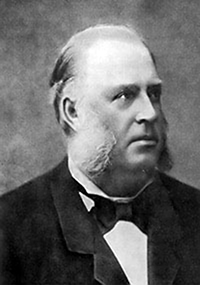
Fredrik Idestam, co-founder of Nokia

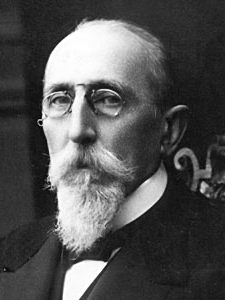
Leo Mechelin, co-founder of Nokia

The name "Nokia" is derived from the town of Nokia, Finland and the nearby Nokianvirta River, which was located next to the company’s original factory. The commercial entities that preceded the modern-day Nokia company included Nokia Ab (Nokia company); Suomen Gummitehdas Oy (Finnish Rubber Works Ltd); and Suomen Kaapelitehdas Oy (Finnish Cable Works Ltd).

In 1865, the mining engineer, Fredrik Idestam established a ground wood pulp mill on the banks of the Tammerkoski rapids in the town of Tampere, in southwestern Finland. Tampere was then part of the Russian Empire. In 1868, Idestam built a second mill near the town of Nokia. Nokia lies 15 kilometres (9.3 mi) west of Tampere, by the Nokianvirta river. The river had better hydropower resources than those at Tampere. In 1871, Idestam and Leo Mechelin, a statesman and Idestam's friend, transformed Idestam's enterprises into a public limited company called Nokia Ab.

In the late 1800s, Mechelin wanted to expand the company into the electricity business. However, Idestam refused. In 1896, Idestam retired and Mechelin became the company's chairman. He remained chairman from 1898 to 1914. During this time, Mechelin persuaded shareholders to allow the company to enter the electricity business. In 1902, Nokia commenced electricity generation.

== 20th century ==
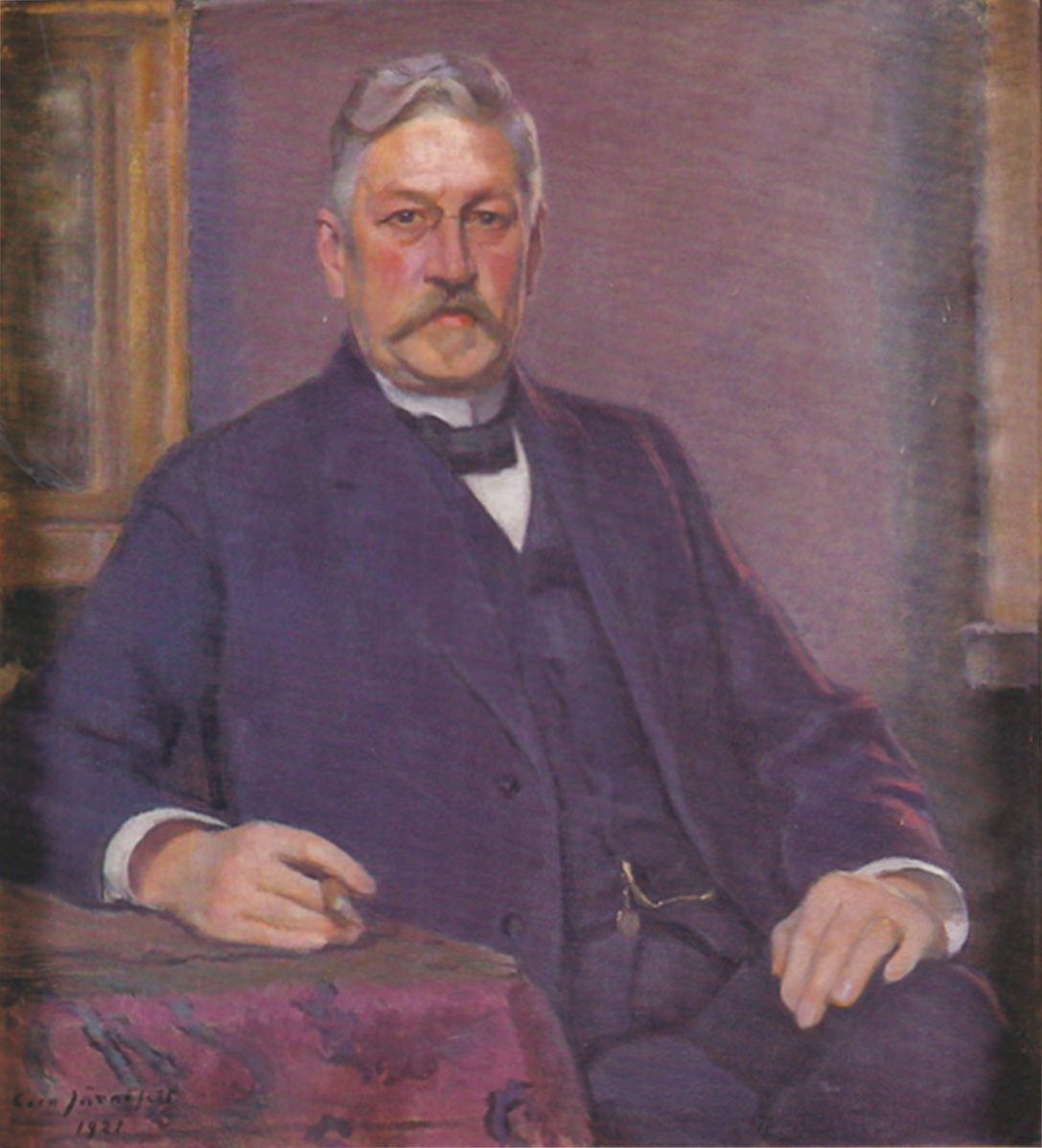
Portrait of Eduard Polón by Eero Järnefelt.

Eduard Polón (1866 – 1930), was a Finnish business leader. In 1898, Polón founded Suomen Gummitehdas Oy (Finnish Rubber Works) - a manufacturer of galoshes and other rubber products. In the early 1900s, the Finnish Rubber Works established factories near Nokia and used the town's name in the company's branding.

After World War I, the Nokia Company was nearing bankruptcy and was acquired by the Finnish Rubber Works.

In 1932, the Finnish Rubber Works also acquired the Suomen Kaapelitehdas Oy (Finnish Cable Works). The cable works had been founded in 1912 by Arvid Wickström. His company produced telephone, telegraph, and electrical cables.

In 1963, after 16 years as a technical director, Verner Weckman became the president of the Finnish Cable Works company. Weckman was a wrestler and was Finland's first Olympic Gold medallist. After World War II, Finnish Cable Works supplied cables to the Soviet Union as part of its war reparations. This gave the company a foothold for later trade.

=== Nokia Corporation ===
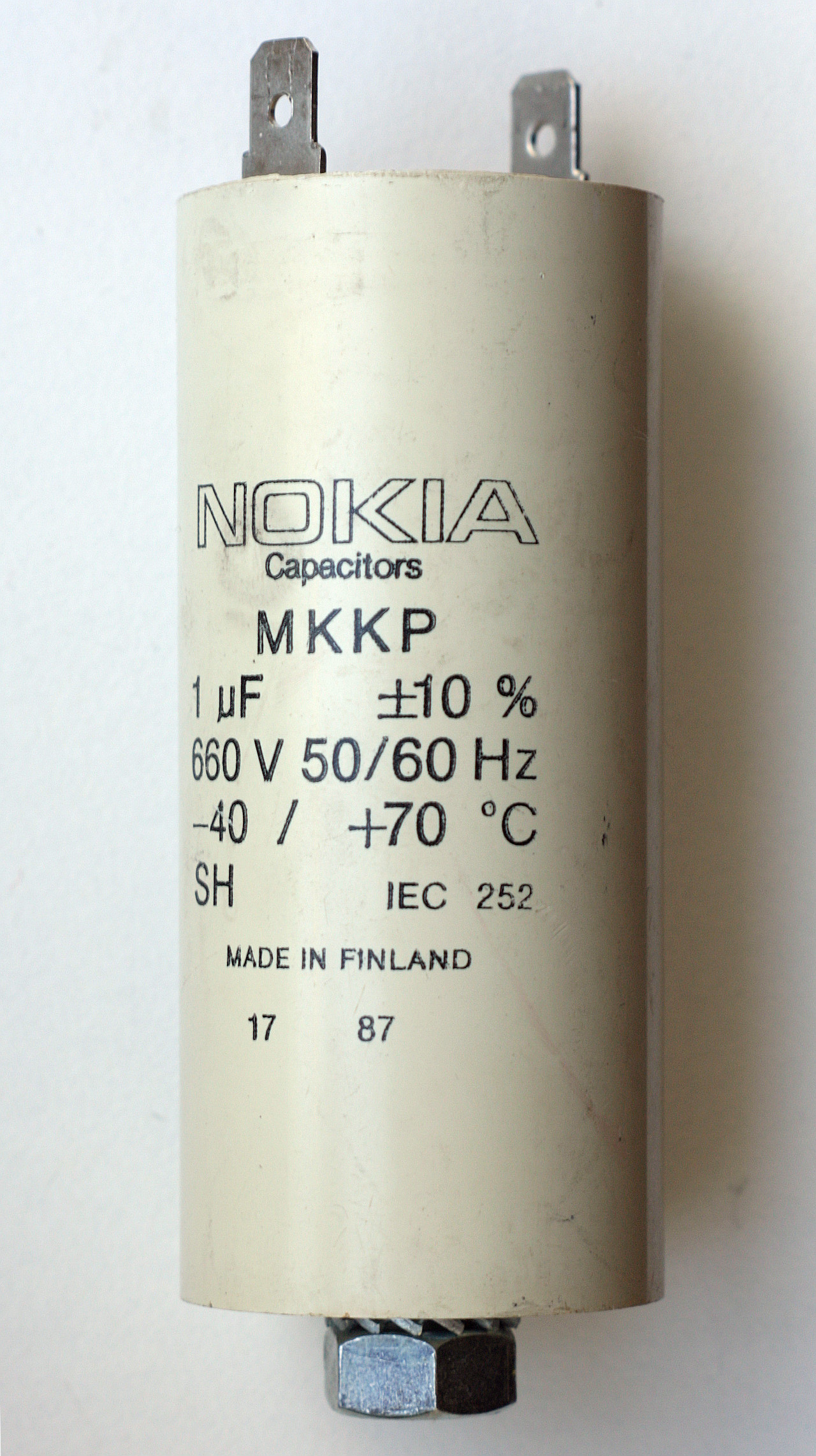
A capacitor made by Nokia Capacitors

In 1967, Nokia Corporation was formed through the merger of the three companies. The new company manufactured products including paper items, car and bicycle tires, rubber boots, communications cables, televisions and other consumer electronics, personal computers, generators, robotics, capacitors, Military technology and equipment (such as the SANLA M/90 device and the M61 gas mask for the Finnish Army), plastics, aluminum and chemicals.

In 1960, a cable division of the Nokia group had been formed. In 1962, it produced a pulse height analyzer used in nuclear power plants. In 1967, an electronics division within the Nokia Corporation was formed. It operated for the next fifteen years, sometimes at a loss. Nokia researchers were encouraged to develop their own projects. This may have contributed to Nokia's focus on mobile phone technologies.

=== Network equipment ===
In the 1970s, Nokia produced the Nokia DX 200, a digital switch for telephone exchanges. The DX 200 became the workhorse of the network equipment division. Its architecture allowed it to be further developed into other switching products. For example, in 1984, the development of an exchange for the Nordic Mobile Telephone network was begun. The network equipment division was merged with a Finnish State entity to form "Telefenno". In 1987, the state sold its shares in Telefenno to Nokia and in 1992, the name was changed to Nokia Telecommunications.

In 1998, the Israeli multinational company, Check Point which was founded in 1993, established a partnership with Nokia. Check Point's software was bundled with Nokia's network security tools.

=== Mobile radio telephony ===
Prior to cellular mobile telephony, there was mobile radio telephony. In the 1960s, Nokia had started producing commercial and military mobile radio telephones. From 1964, Nokia had developed VHF radios in collaboration with Salora Oy. From 1966, Nokia and Salora had developed ARPs (Autoradiopuhelin or radio car phones). In 1971, this technology became the first commercially available mobile phone network in Finland and in 1978, it offered 100 percent coverage in Finland. In the 1970s and 1980s, Nokia developed the Sanomalaitejärjestelmä (messaging system), a digital, portable and encrypted text-based communications device for the Finnish Defence Forces.

=== Nokia mobile telephone (1G) ===
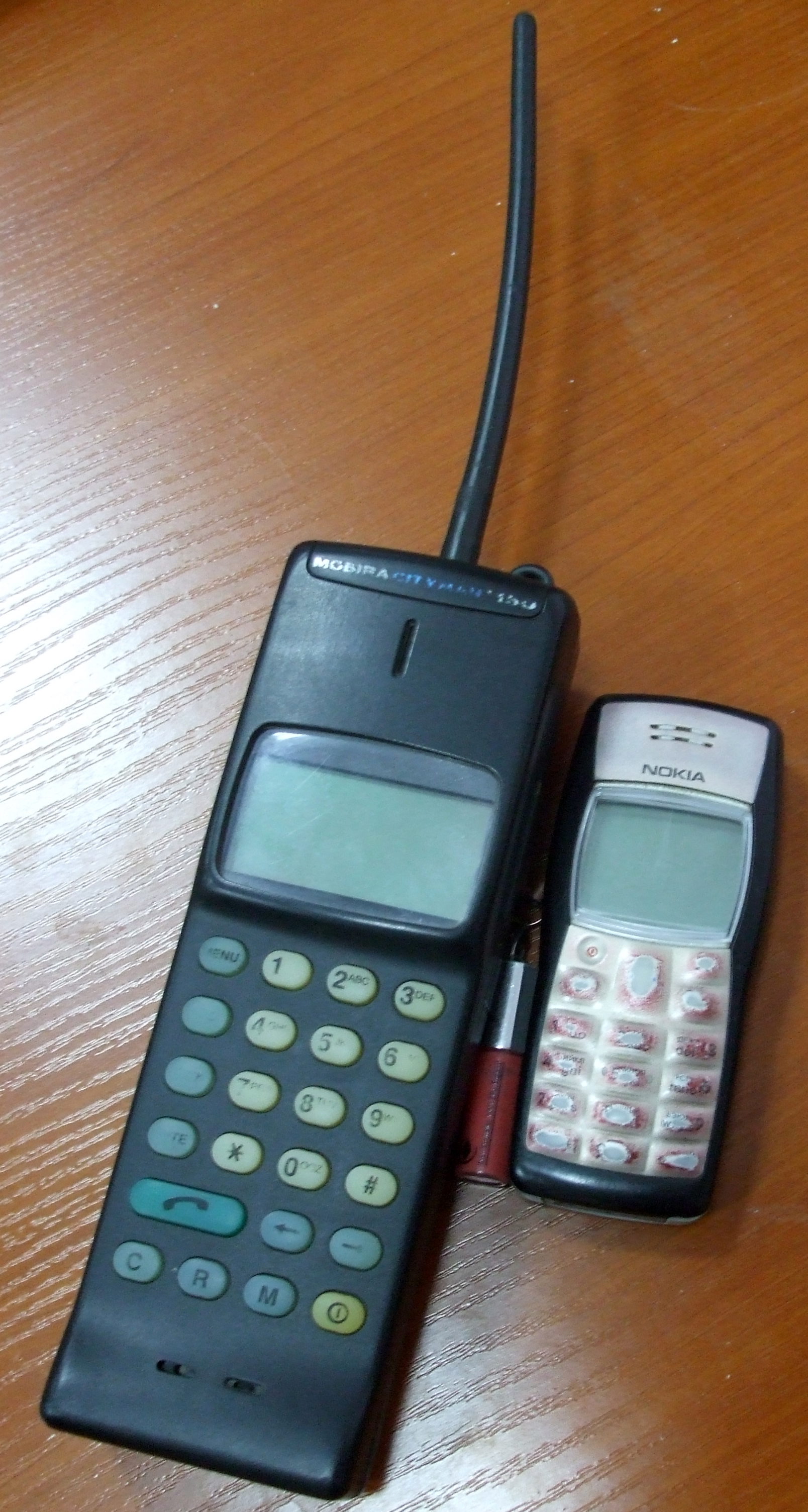
The Mobira Cityman 150, Nokia's NMT-900 mobile phone from 1989 (left), compared to the Nokia 1100, a GSM phone from 2003.

In 1979, Nokia and Salora established a joint venture, "Mobira Oy". Mobira developed mobile phones for the Nordic Mobile Telephone (NMT) network, called the "1G" and was the first fully automatic cellular phone system. It became commercially available in 1981. In 1982, Mobira introduced its first car phone, the "Mobira Senator" for NMT – 450 networks.

In 1984, Nokia purchased Salora. Nokia's telecommunications division was renamed "Nokia-Mobira Oy". In the same year, the "Mobira Talkman", an early portable phone was launched. In 1987, Nokia introduced its first mobile phone, the "Mobira Cityman 900" for NMT– 900 networks. In comparison to the NMT – 450 network, there was a better signal strength but less coverage. While the Mobira Senator of 1982 had weighed 9.8 kg (22 lb) and the Talkman just under 5 kg (11 lb), the Mobira Cityman weighed only 800 g (28 oz) including its battery. The phone, which was considered expensive, became an item indicating a high status.

In 1987, the Soviet leader Mikhail Gorbachev was seen using a Mobira Cityman in Helsinki. The phone developed the nickname, the "Gorba". In 1989, Nokia-Mobira Oy was renamed "Nokia Mobile Phones".

=== Global system for mobile communications (2G) ===
Nokia contributed to the development of the GSM 2G. It was able to carry data (computing) as well as voice traffic. Nordic Mobile Telephony (NMT) was an early provider of international roaming. In 1987, GSM 2G became the new European standard for digital mobile technology.

In 1989, Nokia delivered its first GSM network to the Finnish operator Radiolinja. On 1 July 1991, in Helsinki, the first telephone call on the GSM G2 network was made by Harri Holkeri, the Prime Minister of Finland. He used a prototype Nokia GSM phone to make the call. In 1992, the first GSM phone, the Nokia 1011, was made commercially available. The model number, "1011" refers to its launch date on 10 November 1992. In 1994, a branding ringtone, the Nokia tune, was included with the Nokia 2100 series.

The GSM 2G network and mobile phones provided improved voice calls, international roaming and support for new services such as text messaging (Short Message Service (SMS)). In 2008, the GSM 2G network had approximately 3 billion users. There were at least 700 mobile phone commercial providers in 218 nations or territories. There were 15 mobile phone connections per second and 1.3 million mobile phone connections per day.

=== Personal computers ===
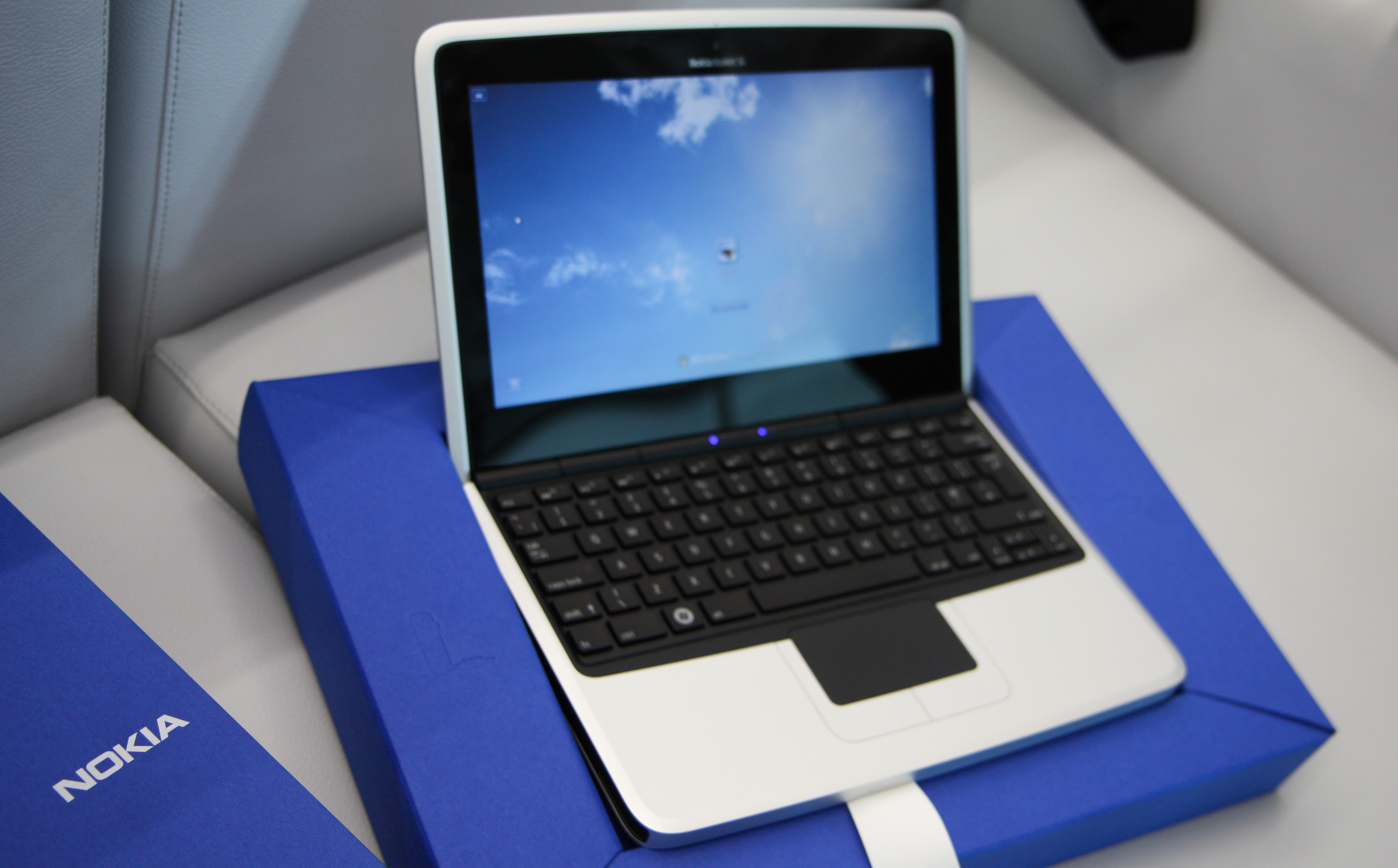
The Nokia Booklet 3G mini laptop.

In the 1980s, Nokia's computer division "Nokia Data" produced a series of personal computers called the "MikroMikko". It was aimed at the business market. MikroMikko 1, was released on 29 September 1981. Its competitor was the IBM personal computer. In 1991, Nokia Data was sold to a British company, International Computers Limited (ICL).

Nokia produced Cathode ray tubes (CRT) and thin film transistor liquid crystal displays (|TFT LCDs) for personal computers and other applications. In 2000, Nokia sold its display products division to ViewSonic. However, in August 2009, Nokia released the Nokia Booklet 3G mini laptop which it continued for a short time. Other abandoned Nokia products include DSL modems and digital set-top boxes.

=== Telecommunications ===
In the 1980s under the chief executive officer (CEO) Kari Kairamo, Nokia expanded, mostly through acquisitions. In the late 1980s and early 1990s, however, Nokia corporation experienced financial difficulties. Losses were made in the television manufacturing division. In 1988, Nokian Tyres became a separate entity. Nokia's paper division was sold in 1989. In 1990, Nokian Footwear was a separate entity. During the rest of the 1990s, Nokia divested itself of all other businesses.

In 1988, Kairamo committed suicide. Following his death, Simo Vuorilehto became Nokia's chairman and CEO. From 1990 to 1993, Finland was in recession. Vuorilehto made major changes to the Nokia corporation. The telecommunications division was stream-lined. The television and personal computing divisions were sold.

In 1992, Jorma Ollila became CEO. He made telecommunications Nokia's sole concern. International sales increased relative to those in Finland. By the mid-1990s, Nokia's supply of mobile telephones could not meet demand. Changes to Nokia's supply chain were made. Between 1996 and 2001, Nokia's revenue increased from 6.5 billion euros to 31 billion euros and between 1998 and 2012, Nokia was the world's largest mobile phone manufacturer. Nokia's logistics and economies of scale advantaged the company.

== 21st century ==
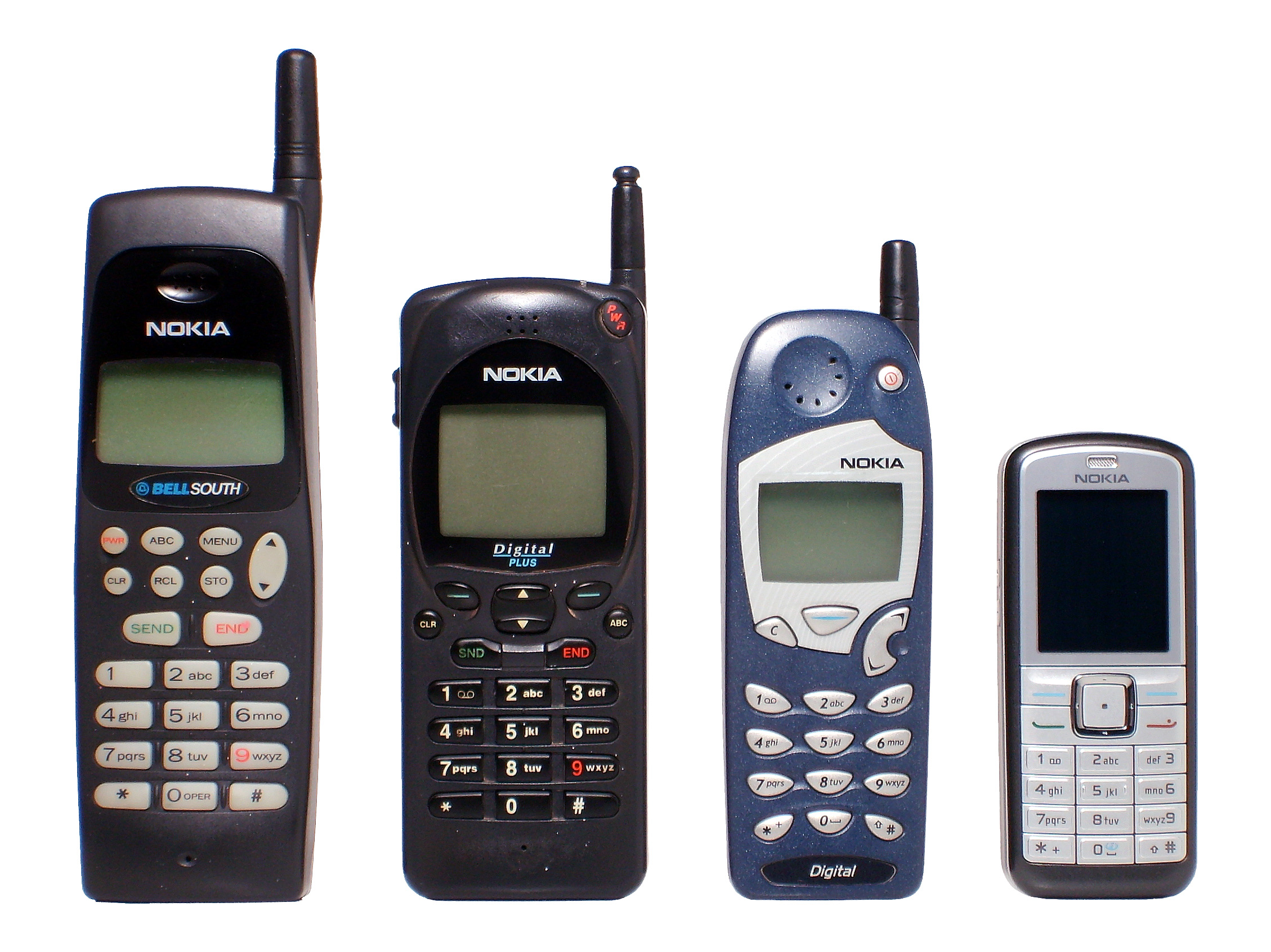
Reduction in size of Nokia mobile phones. Left to right: Nokia 638 (1996; 19.06 cm height), Nokia 2160 EFR (1996; 16.42 cm), Nokia 5160 (1998; 14.84 cm), Nokia 6070 (2006; 10.5 cm)

In 2000, Nokia launched the Nokia 3310. In 2003, the Nokia 1100 handset was launched. Nokia combined a video game console and a mobile phone in the "N-Gage", although this product was not so successful. Nokia's late entry in the growing market of clamshell phones had been cited as a reason for the company losing market share in 2004.

In April 2008, Nokia Productions started a mobile movie-making project. The movie which was presented at the Nokia Theater Los Angeles on 14 October 2008 was directed by Spike Lee. It was approximately 15 minutes long and comprised short segments made on phones contributed by the public. The theme of the movie was "humanity".

In 2008 Nokia entered the smartphone market with their Nokia 5800 XpressMusic model. In 2009, Nokia reentered the personal computing market. Its product, the Nokia Booklet 3G was a Windows-based netbook. The Series 40 was a phone platform used in feature phones, mainly running Java-based applications.

Nokia acquired Smarterphone, a company making the Smarterphone OS for "low end" phones and merged it with Series 40 to form the Asha Platform, which also used some user interface characteristics from Nokia's MeeGo platform. The Asha 501 used this new operating system. The Series 40 was discontinued in late 2014.

=== Symbian OS ===
Until 2011, Symbian was Nokia's main smartphone operating system. The devices using the Symbian operating system included the Nokia 7650, Nokia N-Gage, Nokia N96, Nokia 6600, Nokia 7610, Nokia 6630, Nokia N90, Nokia N95, Nokia N82, Nokia E71, Nokia 5800 XpressMusic, Nokia N97, Nokia X6 and the Nokia N8. The 2012 Nokia 808 PureView had a 41-megapixel camera. It was the last phone using the Symbian platform.

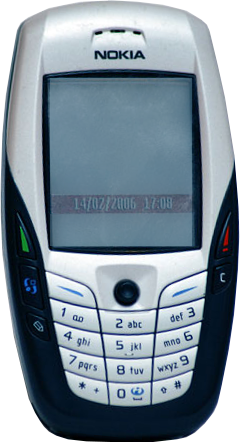
Nokia 6600 with a VGA camera, Bluetooth and expandable memory.

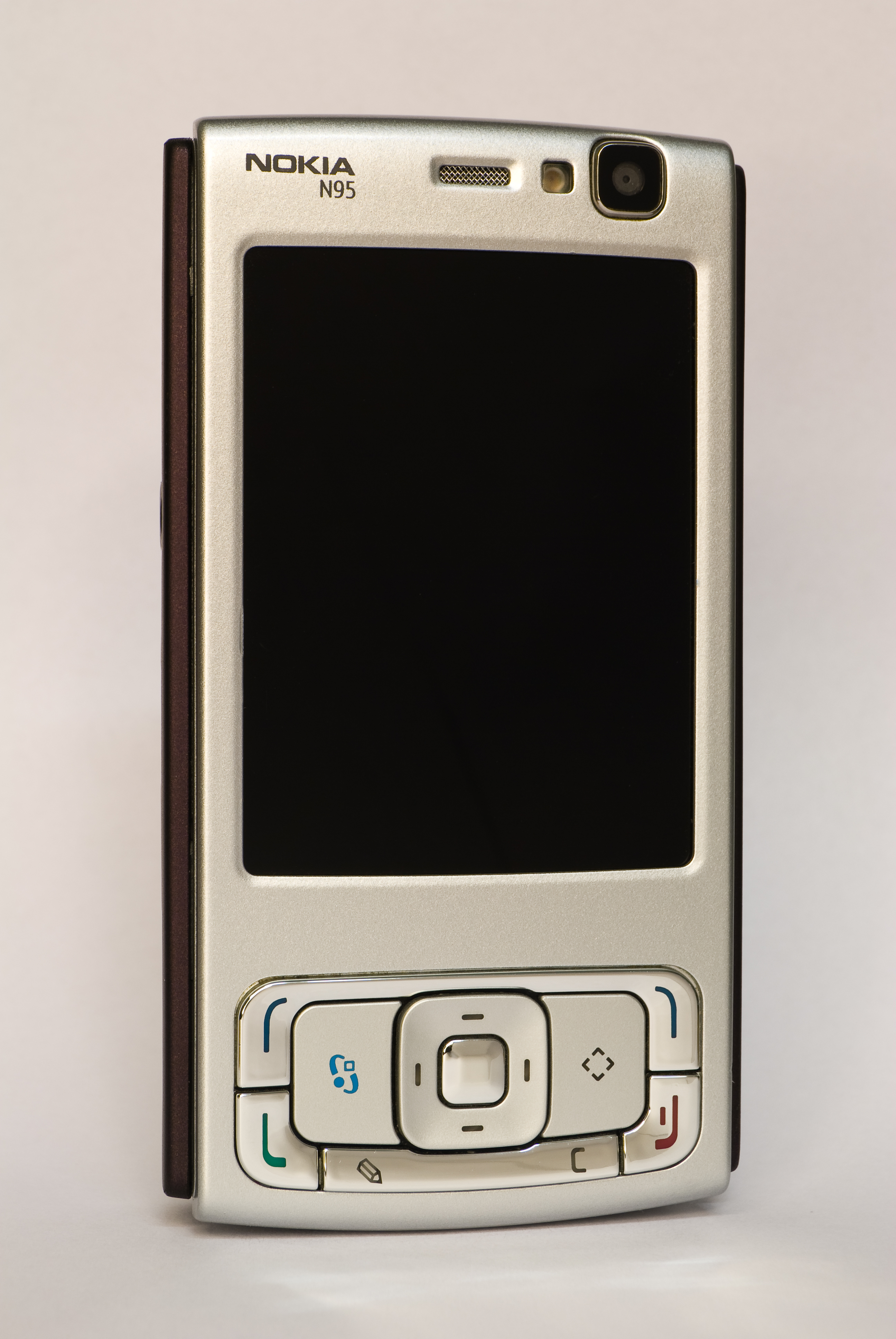
Nokia N95 with a 5-megapixel camera and sliding multimedia keys.

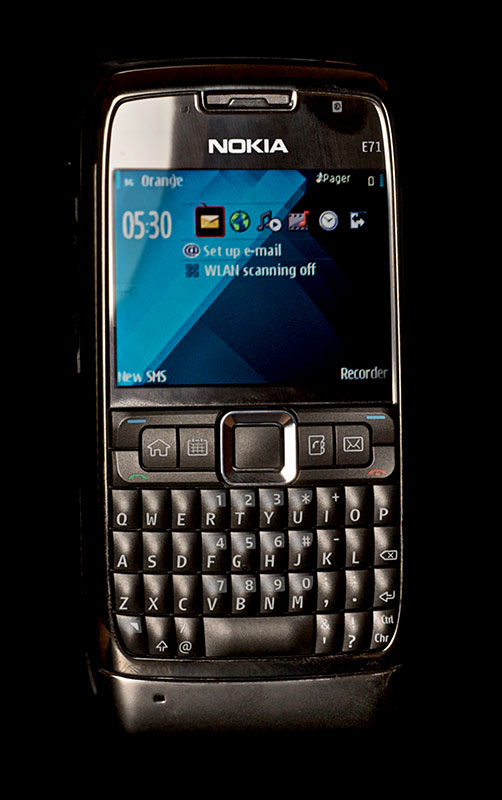
Nokia E71 with a QWERTY keyboard.

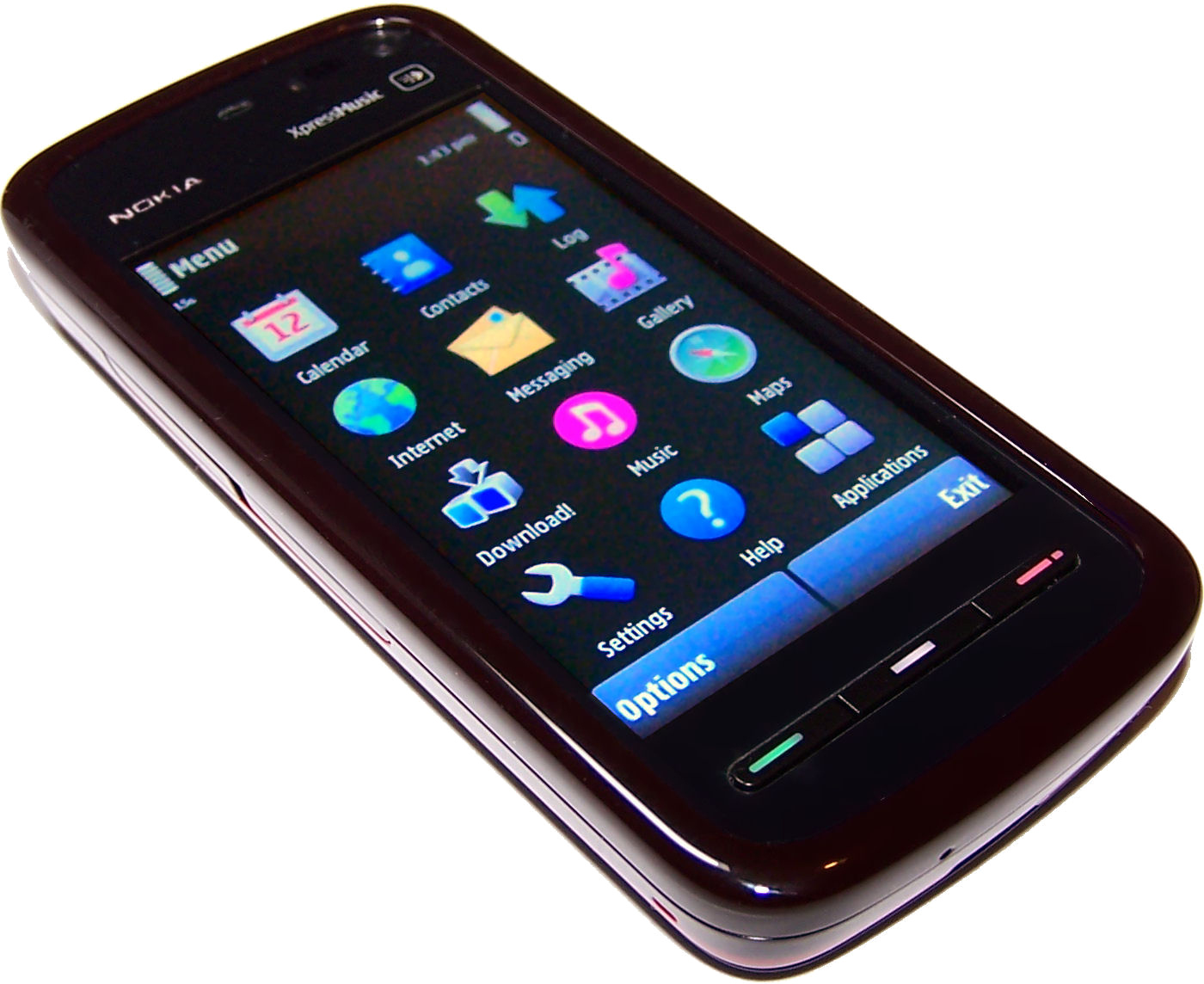
Nokia 5800 XpressMusic, with a full touchscreen.

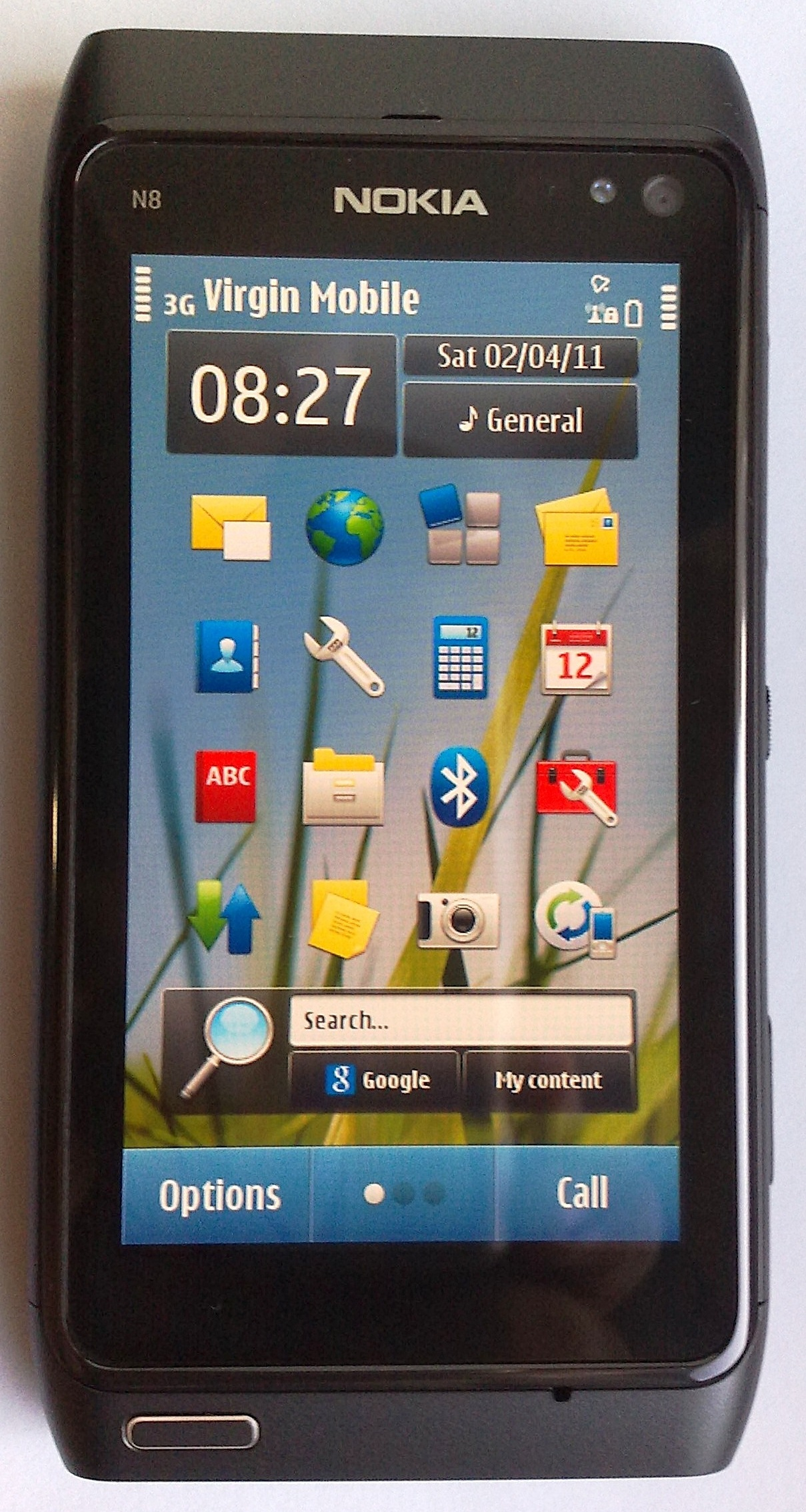
Nokia N8 the first Symbian^3 device, and the first to feature a 12-megapixel autofocus lens. (Symbian^3/Anna/Belle)

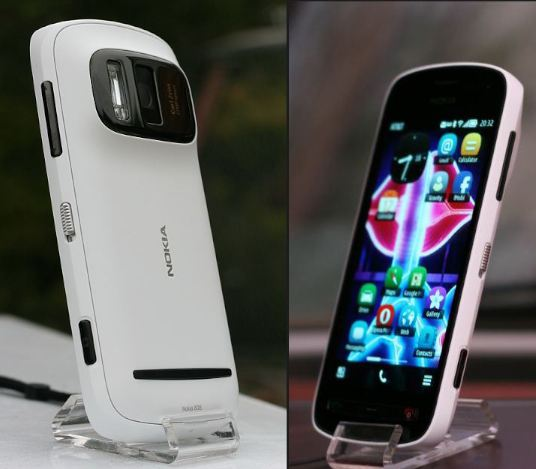
Nokia 808 PureView with a 41-megapixel camera and a 1.3 GHz CPU.

=== Linux devices ===
Nokia's first Linux devices were the Nokia Internet tablets and the Nokia N900, which ran the Debian-based Maemo. The Maemo project merged with Intel's Moblin to create MeeGo. The Nokia N9 was released before MeeGo was abandoned in favour of Windows Phone. The final products using Linux were the Nokia X series which had an Android operating system.

=== Reorganizations ===
On 5 May 2000, Nokia opened a mobile phone factory in Komárom, Hungary.

In April 2003, difficulties in Nokia's division of network equipment led to restructuring and layoffs. Nokia's public image in Finland was diminished. litigation was brought against Nokia and a critical documentary television program was broadcast.

In June 2006, CEO of Nokia Jorma Ollila, resigned and became the chairman of Royal Dutch Shell Olli-Pekka Kallasvuo was the new CEO.

In March 2007, Nokia signed an agreement with Cluj County Council, Romania to open a plant near the city in Jucu commune. Moving the production from the Bochum, Germany factory to a low wage country created an uproar in Germany.

In 2008, Nokia ceased its mobile phone distribution in Japan. In 2009, Check Point purchased Nokia's network security division.

In February 2012, Nokia announced that 4,000 employees would be dismissed. This was to allow its manufacturing centres to move from Europe and Mexico to Asia. In March 2012, Nokia dismissed 1,000 employees at its Salo, Finland factory. In June 2012, research facilities in Ulm, Germany and Burnaby, Canada closed. By the end of 2013, 10,000 employees had been dismissed. In January 2013, Nokia dismissed 1,000 employees from its internet technology, production and logistics divisions.

=== Acquisitions ===
On 22 September 2003, Nokia acquired "Sega.com", a branch of Sega in order to develop the N-Gage device. On 10 February 2006, Nokia purchased the Intellisync Corporation, a provider of data and Personal information management (PIM) synchronization software.

On 19 June 2006, Nokia and Siemens AG announced the merger of their mobile and fixed-line phone network equipment businesses with equal holdings. This created the entity "Nokia Siemens Networks" located in Espoo, Finland. Approximately 20,000 Nokia employees were employed by the new company. On 8 August 2006, Nokia purchased the online music distributor "Loudeye Corporation" for approximately US$60 million.

In July 2007, Nokia purchased the media sharing service "Twango". In September 2007, Nokia purchased "Enpocket", a supplier of mobile advertising technology and services. On 10 July 2008, Nokia purchased "Navteq", a U.S. based supplier of digital mapping data, for $8.1 billion.

In September 2008, Nokia purchased "OZ Communications" of Montreal, Quebec, Canada. OZ was a private company with approximately 220 employees.

On 5 August 2009, Nokia purchased some of the assets belonging to "Cellity", a privately owned mobile software company. In September 2009, Nokia purchased some of the assets belonging to "Plum Ventures corporation" to complement Nokia's social location services.

In March 2010, Nokia purchased "Novarra", a mobile web browser firm. In April 2010, Nokia acquired MetaCarta, a local search technology firm. In 2012, Nokia purchased "Smarterphone", a feature phone operating system developer, and the imaging company Scalado.

=== Loss of smartphone market share ===
Apple's iPhone (2007) did not immediately outsell the Nokia smartphones such as the Nokia N95. At the end of the 2007 financial year, Symbian had 62.5 percent of the market share while Microsoft's Windows Mobile had 11.9 percent and BlackBerry (RIM) had 10.9 percent. At the end of the 2008 financial year, Nokia's smartphone market share had fallen to 40.8 percent from 50.9 percent a year earlier. The Nokia E71 became a success in the business market against competitors such as Apple and RIM. On 24 June 2008, Nokia bought the Symbian operating system and in 2009 made it open source. The Nokia 5800 XpressMusic was the company's first major full-touchscreen device. It was a highly successful product, although in retrospect Nokia's decision to build a touch interface on top of S60 has been considered a mistake that led to its decline in the market by 2010.

In early 2009, Nokia released several devices such as the Nokia N97, a touchscreen device with a landscape QWERTY slider keyboard that was focused on social networking which received mixed reviews and the Nokia E52 which received positive reviews. At the end of the 2008 financial year, Symbian's market share was 52.4 percent and at the same time in 2009, it was 46.1 percent with the loss going to Blackberry, iOS and Android.

In 2010, the commercial pressure on Nokia increased. Original equipment manufacturers such as Samsung Electronics and Sony Ericsson chose to make Android based smartphones, not Symbian based smartphones. Nokia developed Symbian^3 to replace the previous Symbian^1 (S60 5th Edition) version but it never became popular as it was still seen as inferior to the user experiences of modern rival platforms. At the end of the 2010 financial year, Symbian's market share was 32 percent while Android's was 30 percent. Despite losing market share, Nokia's smartphones were profitable. Sales in 2010 steadily increased quarter by quarter. In the last quarter of 2010, Nokia sold 4 million N8 smartphones.

In February 2010, Nokia and Intel announced "MeeGo". MeeGo was a merger of their Linux based Maemo and Moblin projects. The project aimed to create one mobile operating system suitable for many types of device including tablets and smartphones. Nokia planned to use MeeGo on its smartphones. This was only achieved on the Nokia N9 (2011).

In February 2011, Elop wrote to his employees. He said Nokia was on a "burning platform". Elop said the "war of ecosystems" (software ecosystem) between iOS and Android was part of Nokia's commercial difficulties.

=== Partnership with Microsoft ===
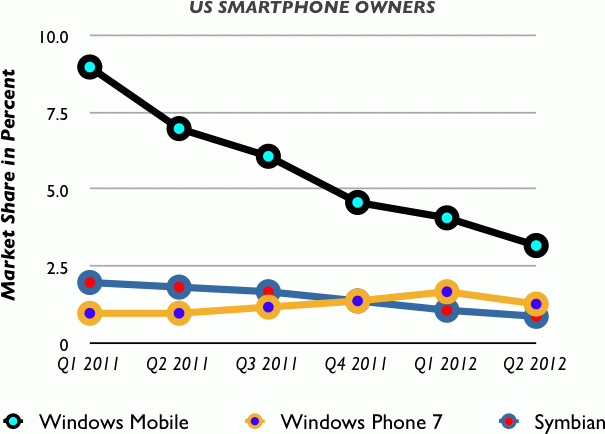
Market share of Symbian, Windows Mobile and Windows Phone 7 among US smartphone owners from Q1 2011 to Q2 2012 according to Nielsen Company.

In February 2011, Stephen Elop and Microsoft's CEO Steve Ballmer formed a business partnership. (Elop had worked at Microsoft.) Nokia adopted Windows Phone as the operating system on its smartphones and accessed the Bing search engine for its devices. The "Here" Nokia maps software was integrated into Microsoft's "Bing" mapping services.

In June 2011, Apple was making more smartphones than Nokia and a successful partnership with Microsoft became imperative for Nokia's business. In September 2011, Nokia dismissed 3,500 employees and closed its factory in Cluj, Romania.

On 26 October 2011, at the Nokia World conference, the first Nokia Windows Phone 7 based devices were launched. They were the Nokia Lumia 710 and the more expensive Nokia Lumia 800.

After the launch, Nokia's share price fell approximately 14 percent and Nokia's smartphone sales rapidly decreased. Between 2011 until 2013, Nokia's sales of smartphones fell from first in the market to tenth.

On 26 January 2012, Nokia reported its sales of the Lumia smartphones was "well above one million", two million sales in the first quarter of the 2012 financial year and four million sales in the second quarter of the 2012 financial year. However, in the second quarter of the 2012 financial year, in North America, Nokia sold 600,000 Symbian and Windows phones combined. In the same period, 26 million iPhones and 105 million Android phones were sold.

In August 2012, while announcing an alliance with Groupon, Elop identified Google as a competitor.

On 8 February 2012, Nokia dismissed 4,000 employees from smartphone manufacturing plants in Europe. Smartphone assembly was moved closer to component suppliers in Asia. On 14 June 2012, Nokia a further 10,000 dismissals. Production and research sites in Finland, Germany and Canada were closed. On 18 June 2012, Moody's downgraded Nokia's bond rating to junk. On 4 May 2012, a group of Nokia investors filed a class action against the company as a result of disappointing sales. On 22 August 2012, there were calls for Elop's dismissal. In December 2012, Nokia sold its headquarters, Nokia House, for €170 million and then leased the property. In the fourth quarter of the 2012 financial year, Nokia sold 6.6 million smartphones (2.2 million Symbian and 4.4 million Lumia devices).

In May 2013, Nokia released the Asha platform on its inexpensive smartphone devices. The American media company Vox Media speculated Nokia was not fully committed to Windows.

In the same month, Nokia entered a partnership with China Mobile, the Chinese mobile service provider to make the Lumia 920 (Lumia 920T) available in China.

In the second quarter of the 2013 financial year, Nokia recorded an operating loss of €115m. Nokia's revenue fell to €5.7bn. Nokia's hanset sales results were especially poor in China. However, in the same period, sales of the Lumia smartphone exceeded those of BlackBerry's handsets. In the second quarter of the 2013 financial year, 7.4 million Lumia devices were sold.

=== Sale of mobile phone business to Microsoft ===
On 25 April 2014, Nokia sold its mobile phone business to Microsoft for approximately €3.79bn. €1.65bn was paid by Microsoft for a ten-year license to Nokia's patents. Nokia's mobile phone assets became a part of Microsoft Mobile, based in Finland. The purchase was delayed from March 2014 to April 2014 while a taxation dispute in India was resolved.

Microsoft acquired the Asha, X and Lumia brands, but had only a limited license to the Nokia brand. Microsoft could only use the Nokia brand to promote Asha, X and Lumia products until December 2015, and feature phones for 10 years. Microsoft did not acquire any rights to the Nokia tune but can use it as the default ringtone on Nokia branded devices. Nokia was prohibited from manufacturing any Nokia branded smartphones until December 2015. Microsoft also took over Nokia's website and social media outlets for a minimum of one year. Microsoft used Nokia branding until October 2014.

Elop became the head of Microsoft's devices division. Risto Siilasmaa became acting CEO of Nokia until the appointment of Rajeev Suri.

Nokia continued Nokia Networks, its infrastructure division and Nokia Technologies, its development and licensing division.

In July 2014, Microsoft dismissed 12,500 former Nokia employees. Microsoft also ended development of Nokia's non-Windows Phone product lines.

=== Sale of licenses ===
In October 2014, Nokia and China Mobile signed a $970 million framework deal for delivery between 2014 and 2015.

On 17 November 2014, Ramzi Haidamus, head of the Nokia technologies division said the company planned to re-enter the consumer electronics business by licensing in-house hardware designs and technologies to third-party manufacturers. On 18 November 2014, the N1, an Android tablet manufactured by Foxconn was released.

=== Alcatel-Lucent ===
On 3 November 2016, Nokia purchased the French telecommunications equipment company Alcatel-Lucent for approximately €15.6 billion. At completion, Nokia shareholders held 66.5% of the new company and Alcatel-Lucent shareholders held 33.5% of the new company. Alcatel-Lucent's Bell Labs and submarine cables division were maintained in the new company. The Alcatel-Lucent brand was no longer used. The purchase required approval by China's Ministry of Commerce and French regulators. On August 3, 2015, Nokia announced that it had reached a deal to sell its Here digital maps division to a consortium of three German automakers—BMW, Daimler AG and Volkswagen Group, for €2.8 billion.

=== Foxconn and HMD Global ===
On 18 May 2016 Microsoft sold the Nokia-branded featurephone division to FIH Mobile, a division of Foxconn, and HMD, a new company in Finland. Nokia provided its brand and patent licensing to HMD, and took a seat on the board of directors. On 8 January 2017, Nokia 6, a mid-range smartphone based on the Qualcomm Snapdragon 430 system-on-chip running Android was launched. The Nokia 5, Nokia 3, Nokia 3310 (2017) and Nokia 6 Arte were also released.
