= List of acquisitions by Nokia =

Nokia Corporation is a Finnish multinational communications corporation, founded in 1865. It is headquartered in Keilaniemi, Espoo, a city neighbouring Finland's capital Helsinki. Nokia is engaged in the manufacturing of mobile devices and in converging Internet and communications industries. Nokia was founded by Fredrik Idestam in 1865. The company was subsequently incorporated in the town of Nokia in 1871.

The following is a list of acquisitions by Nokia since December 1997. During the past few years Nokia has been actively acquiring companies with new technologies and competencies, including also investments in minority positions. Since December 1997, Nokia has acquired 41 companies or businesses. The value of each acquisition is listed in either US dollars or Euros. If the value of an acquisition is not listed, then it is undisclosed.

== Acquisitions ==
	Date	Company	Nokia unit	Country	Value (million USD/EUR)		Refs
	Date	Company	Nokia unit	Country	Unadjusted	Adjusted for inflation	Refs
57	27 June 2024	Infinera Corporation	Nokia Corporation	United States	$2300	$2361	
56	29 June 2017	Comptel	Nokia Software	Finland	$370	$486	
55	15 December 2016	Deepfield	Nokia ION	United States			
54	31 June 2016	Withings		France	$190	$255	
53	1 April 2016	Nakina Systems		Canada			
52	15 April 2015	Alcatel - Lucent	Nokia Corporation	France	$16,600	$22547	
51	1 January 2015	Panasonic System Networks	Nokia Networks	Japan			
50	August 2014	SAC Wireless	Service	United States	—	—	
49	April 2013	HideALL	Mobile Application	India	—	—	
48	21 November 2012	earthmine	Location and Commerce	United States	—	—	
47	24 July 2012	Scalado (imaging technology)					
46	November 2011	Smarterphone	Asha platform	Norway	NA	NA	
45	Not yet finished (Expected: late 2010)	Wireless infrastructure assets of Motorola	Nokia Siemens Networks	United States	$1,200	$1772	
44	1 September 2010	Motally (app/webapp tracking software)	Services	United States	—	—	
43	9 April 2010	Novarra Inc. (Java based web browser)	Services	United States	—	—	
42	9 April 2010	MetaCarta, Inc.	Services	United States	—	—	
41	28 September 2009	Dopplr	Services	Finland	—	—	
40	11 September 2009	Plum	Services	United States	—	—	
39	5 August 2009	cellity AG	Services	Germany	—	—	
38	9 February 2009	bit-side GmbH	Services	Germany	—	—	
37	2 December 2008	Symbian Ltd. (Note: The net cash outlay from Nokia to purchase the approximately 52% of Symbian Limited shares it did not already own was approximately EUR 264 million.)	Nokia Corporation	United Kingdom	€264	€395	
36	4 November 2008	OZ Communications	Services & Software	Canada	—	—	
35	15 July 2008	Plazes	Services & Software	Germany	—	—	
34	10 July 2008	Navteq	Nokia Corporation	United States	$8,100	$12112	
33	17 June 2008	Trolltech (Qt Development Frameworks)	Devices	Norway	$153	$229	
32	18 December 2007	Digiskin UK	Nokia Innovation	United Kingdom	—	—	
31	4 December 2007	Avvenu	Enterprise Solutions	United States	—	—	
30	8 October 2007	Enpocket	Nokia Corporation	United States	—	—	
29	24 July 2007	Twango	Multimedia	United States	—	—	
28	16 October 2006	Loudeye Corp.	Multimedia	United States	$60	$96	
27	12 October 2006	gate5 AG	Multimedia	Germany	—	—	
26	30 June 2006	LCC International's U.S. deployment business	Networks	United States	—	—	
25	10 February 2006	Intellisync Corporation	Enterprise Solutions	United States	$430	$687	
24	18 October 2004	Metrowerks Corporation	Nokia Corporation	United States	—	—	
23	3 November 2003	Tahoe Networks	Nokia Networks	United States	—	—	
22	19 August 2003	Sega.com Inc.	Nokia Mobile Phones	United States	—	—	
21	22 April 2003	Eizel Technologies	Nokia Internet Communications	United States	$21	$37	
20	22 May 2002	Redback Networks Inc.	Nokia Networks	United States	—	—	
19	25 July 2001	Amber Networks Inc.	Nokia Networks	United States	$421	$765	
18	28 June 2001	F5 Networks Inc.	Nokia Internet Communications	United States	—	—	
17	7 December 2000	Ramp Networks Inc.	Nokia Internet Communications	United States	$127	$237	
16	20 October 2000	NGI Industrial (NGI) (Note: Nokia increased its ownership to 100% and purchased the additional 49% of the total share capital of NGI from Gradiente Telecom for US$415 million.)	Nokia Mobile Phones	Brazil	$415	$776	
15	8 August 2000	DiscoveryCom Inc.	Nokia Networks	United States	$220	$411	
14	1 February 2000	Network Alchemy Inc.	Nokia Internet Communications	United States	$335	$626	
13	13 December 1999	Security software business from TeamWARE Group	Nokia Wireless Network Solutions	Finland	—	—	
12	22 October 1999	Telekol Group	Nokia Internet Communications	United States	$56.5	$109	
11	2 September 1999	Rooftop Communications Corporation	Nokia Networks	United States	$57	$110	
10	30 June 1999	Aircom International	Nokia Networks	United Kingdom	—	—	
9	14 May 1999	R&D units from TeamWARE Group	Nokia Mobile Phones	Finland	—	—	
8	18 February 1999	InTalk Corporation	Nokia Wireless Business Communications	United States	—	—	
7	16 February 1999	Diamond Lane Communications	Nokia Networks	United States	$125	$242	
6	18 December 1998	Vienna Systems Corporation	Nokia Internet Communications	Canada	$90	$178	
5	17 September 1998	NE-Products Oy	Nokia Mobile Phones	Finland	—	—	
4	20 August 1998	User Interface Design	Nokia Communications Products	Sweden	—	—	
3	25 June 1998	Matra Nortel Communications	Nokia Mobile Phones	France	—	—	
2	9 December 1997	Ipsilon Networks Inc.	Nokia Networks	United States	$120	$241	
1	11 February 1991	Technophone Ltd	Nokia Mobile Phones	United Kingdom	£34M	£80M	

== Divestments ==
Since 1996, Nokia has made the following divestments.

Date	Divestiture target	Nokia unit	Ref.
13 September 2018	Velocix	IP Video	
1 December 2016	HMD Global	Hardware devices	
3 August 2015	HERE Technologies	Mapping and geospatial	
25 April 2014	Entire Devices and Services business	Mobile/Handheld Devices & related services	
Q1 2013	TCS, HCL	IT/ICM businesses including SCM, PLM, ERP	
2012	Vertu		
2011	The Qt Company		
2011	Sofia	Nokia Voip technology	
30 November 2010	Nokia's wireless modem business	Nokia Corporation	
12 July 2010	MetaCarta's enterprise business	Nokia Corporation	
1 December 2009	Venyon	Nokia Corporation	
16 October 2009	Nokia's Symbian Professional Services	Nokia Corporation	
14 April 2009	Nokia's security appliance business	Services	
16 June 2008	Nokia's line fit automotive business	Devices	
2 June 2008	Nokia's Adaptation Software R&D entity	Nokia Corporation	
16 May 2008	Nokia's Identity Systems	Services & Software	
5 November 2007	3G chipset development	Nokia Corporation	
5 September 2005	Professional Mobile Radio business	Networks	
18 March 2005	Nextrom Holding	Nokia Corporation	
30 August 2001	Part of mobile core related R&D	Nokia Networks	
13 March 2001	Narrowband access products	Nokia Networks	
13 June 2000	Cabling and electromechanical units	Nokia Networks	
17 January 2000	Nokia Display Products' branded business	Nokia Display Products	
10 January 2000	Monitor manufacturing unit in Hungary	Nokia Display Products	
1 November 1999	SHD/DWDM business	Nokia Networks	
1 October 1999	Salcomp Oy	Nokia Communications Products	
9 September 1998	Mobile radios and printed circuit boards	Nokia Networks	
7 August 1998	LK-Products Oy	Nokia Mobile Phones	
3 March 1998	Autoliv Nokia AB	Nokia Industrial Electronics	
23 December 1997	Loudspeaker Operations	Nokia Industrial Electronics	
7 February 1997	Tuner Operations	Nokia Multimedia Network Terminals	
17 July 1996	Television production	Nokia General Communications Products	
18 March 1996	Cable Business / NKF Holding NV	Nokia Communications Products	
