= Anna Bartels =

Swedish operatic soprano (1869–1950)

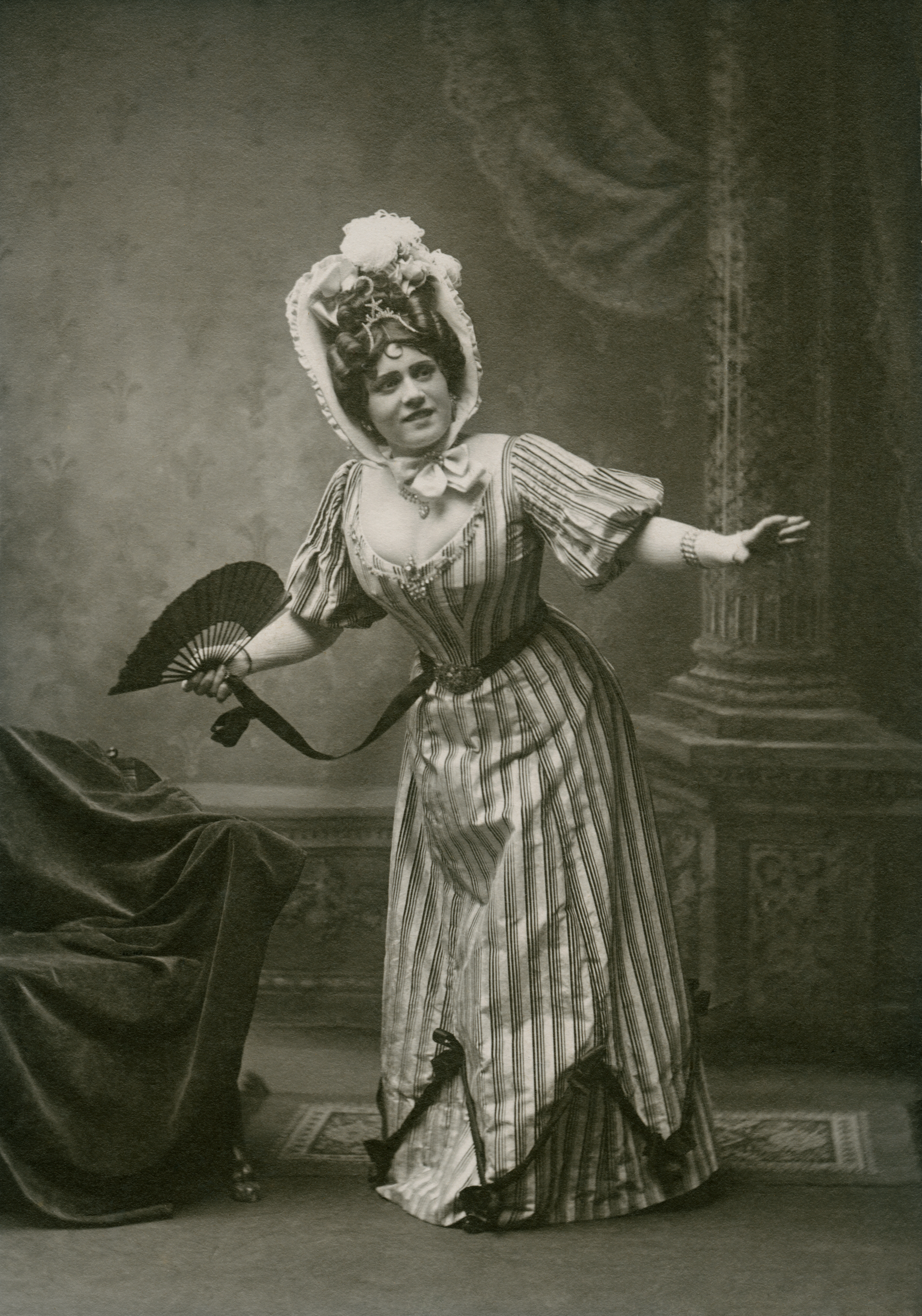
- Bartels as Musette in La bohème, 1901
- Born: Anna Fernquist; 9 December 1869; Gävle, Sweden
- Died: 17 February 1950 (aged 80); Rådmansö, Sweden
- Occupation: Operatic soprano
- Organizations: Royal Swedish Opera
- Awards: Litteris et Artibus

Anna Katarina Bartels née Fernquist (9 December 1869 – 17 February 1950) was a Swedish operatic soprano. She made her debut at the Royal Swedish Opera in 1897 in the title role of Flotow's Martha. Engaged by the company for the next 20 years, she gained popularity as a soubrette and coloratura soprano, performing Swedish premieres: such as Musette in Puccini's La bohème and Woglinde in Wagner's Rheingold. She later turned also to mezzo-soprano roles. In 1923, she was awarded the Litteris et Artibus medal.

== Early life and education ==
Anna Bertels as Fru Fluth in The Merry Wives of Windsor (1913)

Born on 9 December 1869 in Gävle, Anna Fernquist was the daughter of the manufacturer Carl Johannes Fernquist and his wife Charlotta née Larsson. In 1902, she married the Swedish painter Carl Olof Bartels.

She studied first in Gävle under the music teacher Wilhelm Björkgren (1886–87), then in Stockholm under Miss Achorn (1891–92), Signe Hebbe (1893) and Emilie Mechelin (1894–95) and later in Baden-Baden and Paris under Désirée Artôt (1899–1901).

== Career ==
In 1897, she made her debut at the Royal Swedish Opera in Stockholm in title role of Martha. For the next 20 years, she performed with the company, first gaining popularity in soprano roles but later also appearing as a mezzo-soprano. She performed in several Swedish premieres: Musetta in Puccini's La bohème (1901), Woglinde in Wagner's Rheingold (1901), Fattoumah in Henri Rabaud's Mârouf (1915), Marianne in Richard Strauss's Der Rosenkavalier (1920) and La Ciesca in Puccini's Gianni Schicchi (1920). Other roles included Fru Fluth in Nicolai's The Merry Wives of Windsor, the Queen of the Night in Mozart's The Magic Flute, Susanna in his The Marriage of Figaro, Elvira in his Don Giovanni, Philine in Ambroise Thomas's Mignon, Micaela in Bizet's Carmen and Juno in Offenbach's Orpheus in the Underworld.

Bartels is also remembered for her appearances in concerts and lieder recitals. After retiring from the stage in the early 1920s, she taught voice in Stockholm.

Anna Bartels died in Rådmansö in Norrtälje Municipality on 17 February 1950.

== Awards ==
In 1923, for her contributions to Swedish culture, she was awarded the Litteris et Artibus medal.
