= Emma Engdahl-Jägerskiöld =

Finnish opera singer

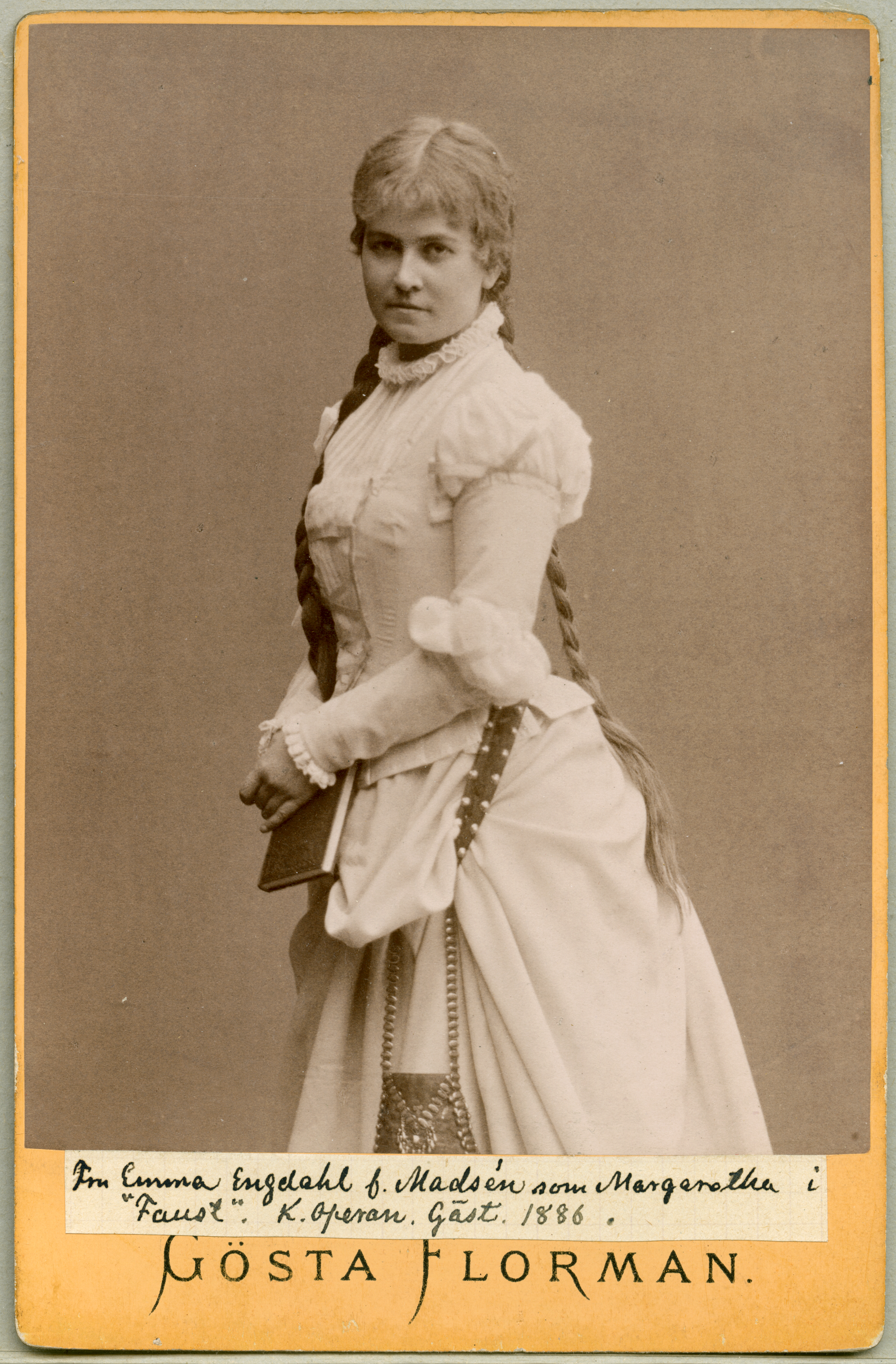

Background information
- Born: Emma Matilda Madsén; 26 April 1852; Saint Petersburg, Russian Empire
- Died: 13 June 1930 (aged 78) Helsinki, Finland
- Genres: Opera

Emma Engdahl-Jägerskiöld (née Madsén; 26 April 1852 — 13 June 1930) was a Swedish-speaking Finnish operatic soprano, and one of the country's first internationally recognised singers, noted especially for her dramatic talents as well as her voice.

== Early life and education ==
Emma Matilda Madsén was born in St Petersburg to Danish goldsmith Mads Peder Madsén and his wife Maria née Sandelin.

She began to receive piano lessons at an early age, but after her family moved, when Emma was aged 8, to Ekenäs, Finland — a small provincial town of less than 2,000 inhabitants — her access to music education became limited; nevertheless, she continued eagerly to practise the piano and singing.

At 19, she married the pharmacist and amateur singer Emil Engdahl, and the couple had a child together, but the union ended in divorce six years later. Afterwards, Emma Engdahl settled in Helsinki, and began to receive tuition from the renowned singing pedagogue Emilie Mechelin.

== Career ==
Engdahl was offered an opportunity to join the operatic section of the newly founded Finnish Theatre (now Finnish National Theatre), but was unable to take up the position due to her almost complete lack of the Finnish language. Instead, she was attached to the Swedish Theatre, where she sang her professional debut in the lead role of Adina, in Donizetti's L'elisir d'amore, to great acclaim.

She is known to have performed for Emperor Alexander II, from whom she received a pair of sapphire earrings as a token of appreciation, as well as a stipend to study singing in Milan between 1877 and 1878. After this, she was granted further royal funding, and moved to Paris to study under the leading pedagogue of the time, Pauline Viardot.

In addition to the Swedish Theatre in Helsinki, Engdahl worked regularly at the Stockholm and Kristiania (now Oslo) operas, as well as touring extensively around Europe, including in Germany, France and the Netherlands. She spent considerable time in Paris, including in the early 1880s when she studied there under Mathilde Marchesi.

In 1889, Engdahl set up her own opera company, Helsingfors Operasällskap (lit. 'Helsinki Opera Society'), which she ran for ten years. The company was based at the city's Alexander Theatre, which eventually also became the first home of the Finnish National Opera.

== Later life ==
In 1890, Engdahl married the lawyer Krister Jägerskiöld, who held the post of Assessor at the Turku Court of Appeal. The couple had three children together. They lived at the Jägerskiöld family seat, Sjölax Manor, in Kimito, near Turku, while also keeping an apartment in Helsinki.

The couple's youngest child, Ann-Mari Jägerskiöld, later taught piano at the Sibelius Academy for forty years.

Upon her second marriage, Emma Engdahl-Jägerskiöld effectively retired, performing afterwards only occasionally at charity galas and similar events.
