= Sanomalaite M/90 =

Finnish military telecommunications device

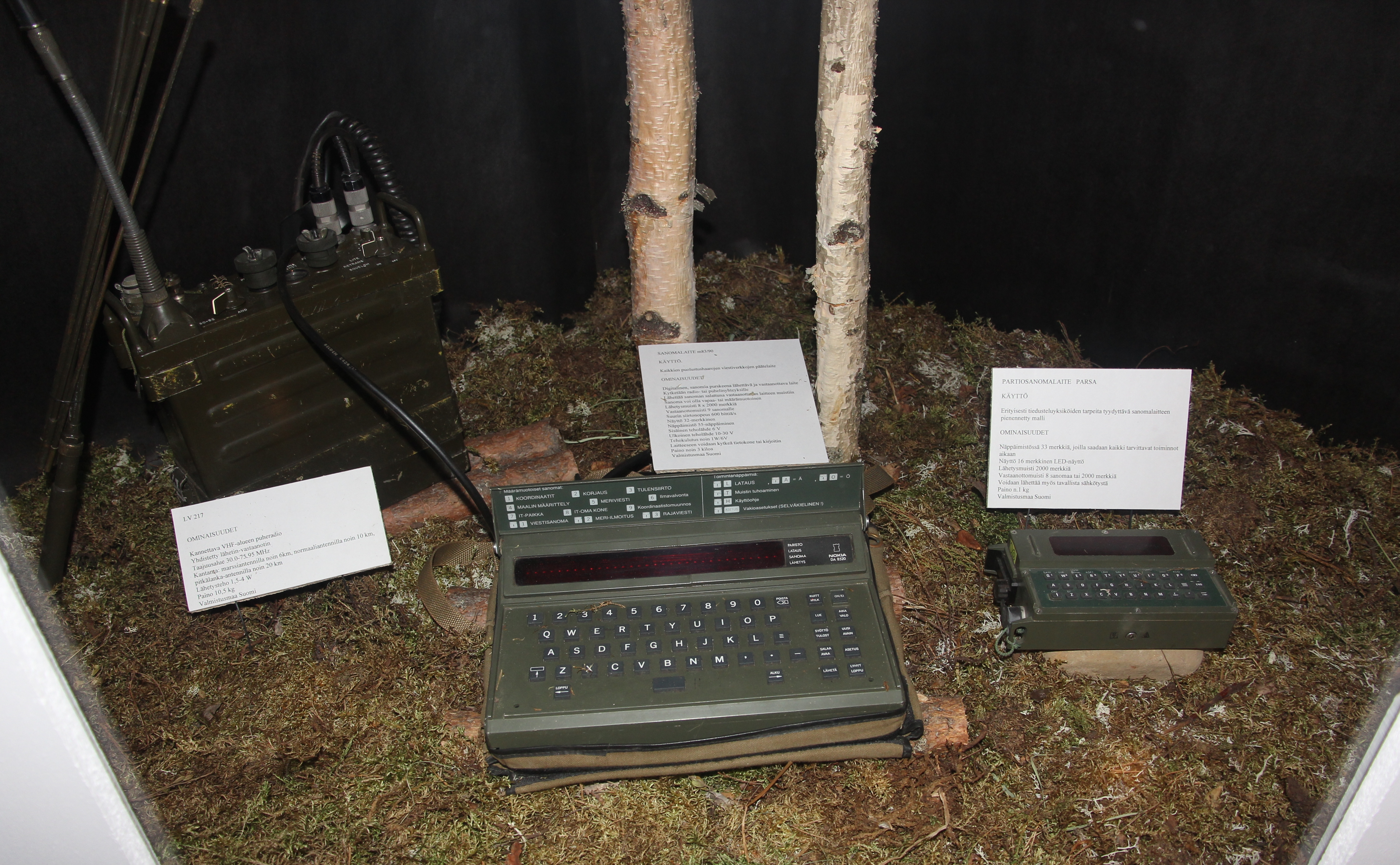
Sanomalaite m83/90 (center) and Partiosanomalaite (right). The m83/90 is connected to a field radio for wireless messaging.

Sanomalaite M/90 (SANLA) (Literally "Message device M/90") is a digital, portable and encrypted text-based communications device developed by Nokia and used by all branches of Finnish Defence Forces.

== History ==
The development of the messaging system Sanomalaitejärjestelmä ("Message device system") that Sanomalaite M/90 belongs to was started in the 1970s and the system went operational in 1983. Sanomalaite M/90 is an upgraded version of the original SANLA which was released in 1983. The messaging system includes also Partiosanomalaite and Keskussanomalaite. There is also a version for air surveillance posts. (Ilmavalvontapääte) The main difference between this type and the others is that it includes reporting buttons for different types of aircraft. (Bomber, fighter, turboprop, jet etc.)

From 2013 onward, the devices are being replaced with Panasonic CF-U1 Toughbook tablet computers running Windows 7 Professional and several applications running on it, such as MATI (Maavoimien tietojärjestelmä) and artillery fire control system.

== Features ==
- Digital; transmits and receives messages as bursts
- Uses radio or telephone connections
- Message is sent encrypted to the memory of the receiving device
- Fixed or freeform messages
- Sending memory 8 x 2000 characters
- Receiving memory for 9 messages
- Maximum speed 600 bit/s
- 32-character display
- 55-button keyboard
- Internal power source 6V
- External power source 10-30V
- Power usage about 1W / 6V
- Can be connected to a computer or a printer
- Weight about 3 kg
- Country of origin Finland
