= Kyocera C4700 =

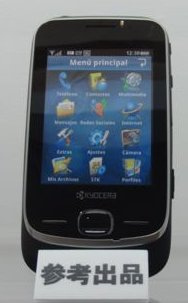
- Manufacturer: Kyocera Wireless
- Compatible networks: GSM, UMTS
- Form factor: Slate
- Dimensions: 111.6×59.6×13.2 mm (4.39×2.35×0.52 in)
- Weight: 103 g (4 oz)
- Operating system: Smarterphone OS 2.4
- Removable storage: Micro SD
- Battery: 1030 mAh Li-ion
- Rear camera: 2.0-megapixel
- Display: 240x320 pixels
- External display: 2.8 inches
- Data inputs: Predictive, multitap
- Other: Touchscreen, Haptic Touch feedback

The Kyocera C4700, also referred to as the Kyocera Cabo, is a touch slate phone from Kyocera with support for social media. It was shown first at the Expo Comm Wireless Japan 2011 show in Tokyo. Features include:

- LCD resistive touch color display - 240 x 320 pixels - 2.8"
- Web access: HTML and WAP 2.0 browser
- Social media: Facebook, Twitter and YouTube
- Email, including Hotmail, Yahoo and Gmail
- GPS locator
- Stereo Bluetooth
- FM radio
- MicroSD card up to 8 GB
- Java MIDP 2.1

Other technical data:

- Battery life: Talk: up to 4 hours, Standby: up to 400 hours on GSM, 350 hours on UMTS
- Bands: UMTS: 850/1900 MHz, GSM: 850/900/1800/1900 MHz

== Carriers ==
- Movilnet
