= Plazes =

Geosocial networking website

Plazes logo.

Plazes AG was a Berlin, Germany-based geosocial networking site. Plazes allowed users to post their location and current activities and share this information with other Plazes users via computers or mobile telephones. On 23 June 2008, Nokia Corporation announced plans to acquire Plazes. Plazes was subsequently integrated to Nokia Maps which itself was integrated to HERE Maps.

== History ==
Plazes AG introduced the beta version of the Plazes service on 16 August 2004. The service was continually updated and began to attract attention on technology blogs. In October 2004, Plazes introduced two APIs: a Web-based API that advised users of the current location of other Plazes users; and a launcher API that allowed users to create their own Plazes launchers. In January 2005, Plazes introduced a Movable Type plugin that allowed users to automatically include or add their location to blog postings. In June 2005, Plazes created an API that allowed users to access photos from their Flickr accounts and to add those photos to their Plazes accounts. A Flickr group of Plazes users quickly sprang up. In 2006, Plazes was awarded the LeadAward in Bronze in the Category "WebLeader 2006″.

== Notable features ==
=== Web interface ===
Plazes Radar Web Interface.

The Plazes Web interface allows users to post a location, the time of day they will be at the location and the activity they will be engaged in at the location. This information can be shared with people selected by the user, Plazes contacts or all members of the Plazes community. In addition to the Web interface, users can update their location using Plazer (see below), via text message or via m.plazes.com, the mobile Plazes Web site. Plazes users are able to publish their Plazes location on Fire Eagle, Twitter, Google Maps, MySpace and on the user's blog.

The Web interface allows users to invite others to join Plazes. Plazes can search a user's Gmail, Yahoo or Hotmail or Microsoft Outlook contacts and send invitations to these contacts.

Plazes allows users to create groups or to join an existing group of Plazes users. Under the Groups tab, Plazes suggests groups that the user may wish to join, as well as offer the user the opportunity to search for existing groups. If the user wants to create a group, the user will need to select a group name and a draft a brief description of the group. The user may add an image to the group to help differentiate it from other groups.

Plazes has a radar function that allows users to discover other Plazes users that are located near the user's current location. The Plazes Radar generates a list of the locations close to the user's current location and lists the number of Plazes users that have previously stated they were at that location. When the user clicks on the location name, information about the user that was at that location is displayed along with a description of the user's activity at the location.

=== Plazes Launcher/Plazer ===
The Plazes Launcher was a client application that allowed Plazes users to update their location and current activities without having to log onto plazes.com. The launcher would detect the MAC address of the user's current router, and query the Plazes database to see if the router already had a "plaze" associated with it. If no existing plaze was found, the user would be prompted to enter details about the plaze, including a name and its physical location.

In March 2006, the Plazes Launcher was rebranded as Plazer. Plazer is integrated with Skype; Skype users are able to publish their location on Skype via Plazer. Plazer is available for Windows, Mac OS X, iPhone and iPod touch, and Symbian. There was also a third-party Plazer available for Nokia's Maemo devices.

== Acquisition by Nokia ==
In August 2007, Nokia announced that it was moving into the services field with the introduction of Ovi. Nokia Maps became part of the Ovi service offering. On 23 June 2008, Nokia Corporation announced plans to acquire Plazes. As part of the acquisition, Plazes gained access to the millions of users that own a Nokia device. At the same time, Nokia gained technology and a research team that was on the cutting edge of the geosocial networking trend. The acquisition closed on 15 July 2008. Post acquisition, Plazes became part of Nokia's Services business unit.

== Closure ==
On 4 May 2012 the Plazes team sent an email message for their users informing that on the next week will go out of service. Users could export their Plazes history to Nokia Maps which itself was integrated to HERE Maps.

== See also ==
- Geosocial networking
- Location-based service
- Nokia Corporation
- List of acquisitions by Nokia
