= Nokia Booklet 3G =

Netbook model

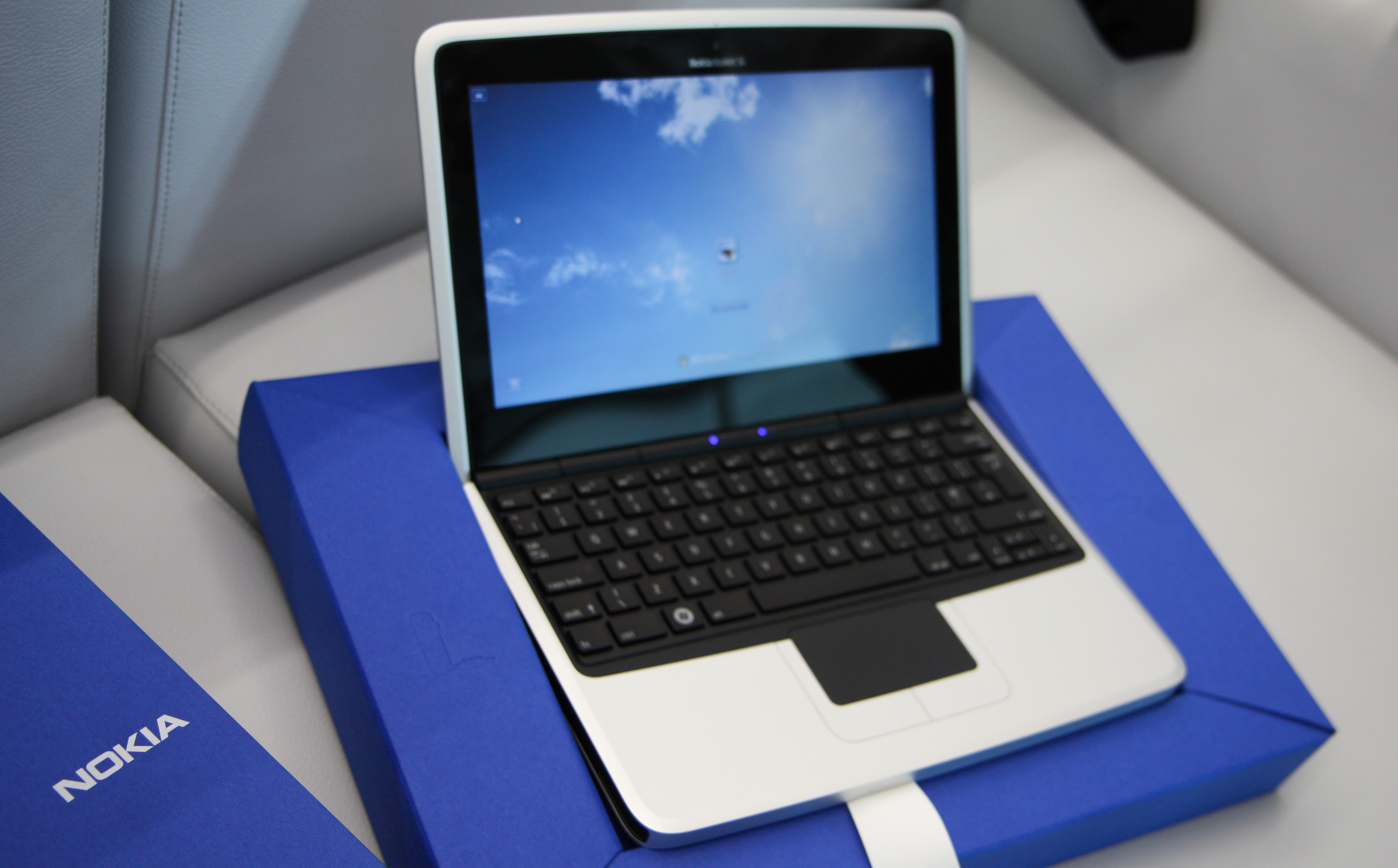
- Nokia booklet 3G
- Developer: Nokia
- Type: Netbook
- Introductory price: €575
- Discontinued: Yes
- Media: Toshiba MK1235GSL 4200rpm 120 GB SATA HDD
- Operating system: Windows 7 Starter 32-bit
- CPU: Intel Atom Z530 1.6 GHz
- Memory: 1 GB DDR2 RAM
- Display: 10.1-inch (260 mm) 1280x720 glossy display
- Graphics: US15W (GMA 500)
- Camera: built-in 1.3 megapixel webcam with microphone
- Connectivity: 3x USB 2.0 ports SD card reader HDMI 1.2; 3.5mm headphone jack Wi-Fi 802.11 b/g/n WLAN; 3G/HSPA; Bluetooth 2.1; A-GPS
- Power: 12 hours of battery life, AC-200 (19V⎓1,85A)
- Dimensions: 19.9 mm × 185 mm × 264 mm (0.78 in × 7.28 in × 10.39 in)
- Weight: 1.25 kg (2.8 lb)

The Nokia Booklet 3G was a netbook produced by the Finnish company Nokia. It was announced on 24 August 2009.

== History ==
The Booklet 3G was Nokia's first netbook. The company produced a series of personal computers in the 1980s called MikroMikko, but sold that business in 1991 to focus on mobile phone production. Though Kai Öistämö, Nokia's executive vice-president for devices, has said the Booklet is "a natural evolution for us," Stephen Williams from The New York Times says it is "more of a homecoming" because of Nokia's prior computer business. Nokia's expansion into the netbook market is contrary to computer maker Apple's 2007 expansion into the phone market with their iPhone.

Nokia announced the device in August 2009. The price was announced to be €575 before tax, making it one of the higher-priced netbooks available.

== Design and technology ==
Following the defence of the original netBook trademark by long-term partner company Psion the previous year, Nokia described the Booklet 3G as a "mini-laptop", although it was widely described as a netbook by others. It is 2 centimetres (0.79 in) thick and weighs 1.25 kilograms (2.8 lb), and is cased in an aluminium shell. Its glossy display measures 10.1 inches (260 mm) diagonally, and supports high-definition video.

The Booklet uses an Intel Atom Z530 processor to run the Microsoft Windows 7 operating system. Nokia says that the battery will last up to 12 hours per charge. The Booklet supports network connections through Wi-Fi, Bluetooth and 3G/HSPA. It also offers telecommunications support via SIM card, has a built-in A-GPS receiver and accelerometer, and includes Nokia's Ovi Maps service. The integrated Intel GMA 500 graphic system is poorly supported by the Linux distributions, since the drivers for it are proprietary software.

CNET rated it 4/5, saying it is a "wonderful piece of engineering" and praising its integrated 3G modem, its high-resolution screen, its exceptional battery life and its fan-free design, though they noted it was more expensive than most netbooks. Laptopmag rated only 3/5.

== See also ==
List of Nokia products
