= Smarterphone =

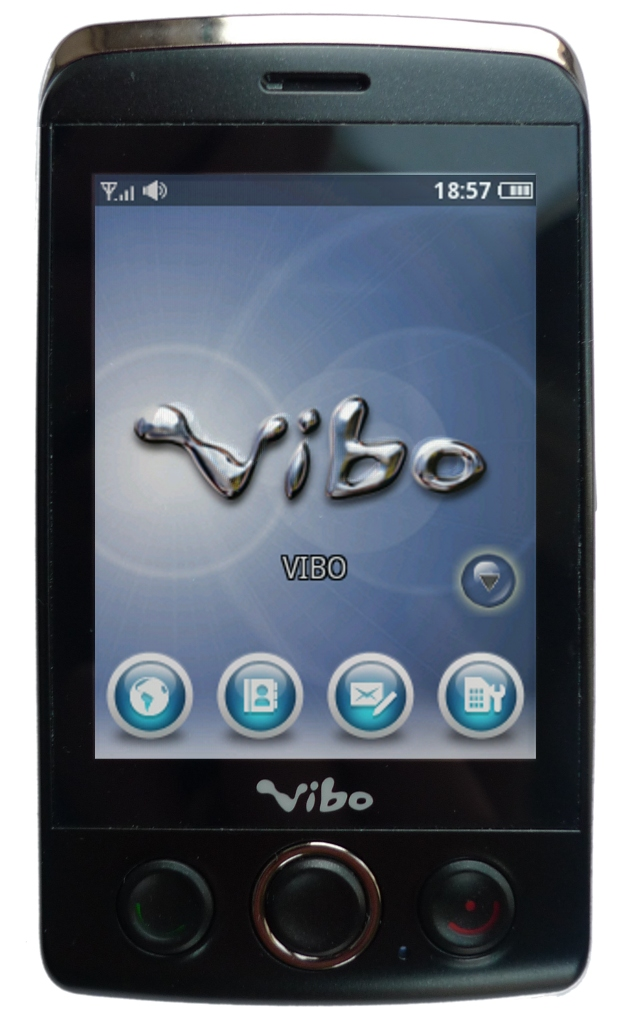
- Company type: Private, owned by Nokia
- Industry: Software
- Founded: 1993
- Headquarters: Oslo, Norway
- Key people: Egil Kvaleberg CEO
- Products: Mobile operating system and application suite
- Number of employees: 30

Smarterphone was a Norwegian company making software for mobile phones, founded in 1993 as Kvaleberg AS before being renamed in December 2010. In June 2007, venture capital investor Ferd invested €2 million in the company. By January 2010, further €3.6 million was invested. Nokia completed acquisition of Smarterphone by November 2011. The head office was in Oslo, Norway, but the company also had offices in Taiwan, South Korea, Japan and the United States.

Smarterphone developed mobile software for handsets, with mobile phone OEMs, ODMs and chipset vendors as customers. The company also provided professional services in the above areas.

In 2008, then as Kvaleberg, the company joined the LiMo Foundation, and at the 2009 Mobile World Congress they presented the Madrid handset, in cooperation with Compal Communications.

== Smarterphone OS ==
Smarterphone OS
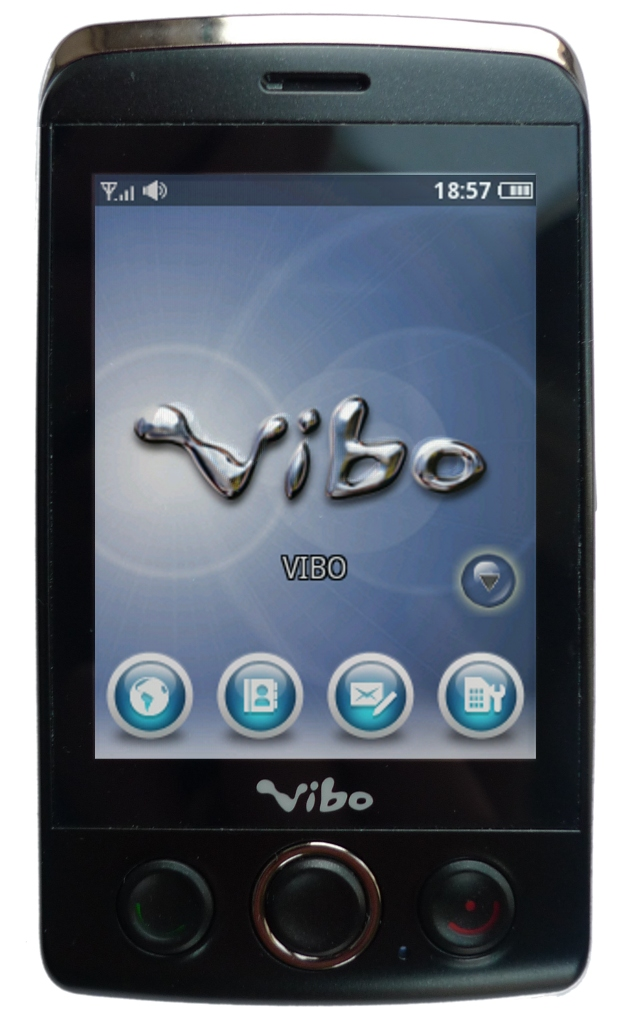
- Smarterphone OS 2.2
- Developer: Smarterphone
- Written in: Scheme (UI) and C++ (core)
- Working state: Current
- Source model: Closed source
- Initial release: 21 October 2008
- Latest release: 3.2
- Supported platforms: ARM/Qualcomm, ARM/Broadcom, ARM/TI
- Kernel type: Real-time kernel
- Default user interface: Graphical touch and/or keypad (ITU or QWERTY)
- Official website: smarterphone.com

The company's main product was Smarterphone OS, which was a platform-independent full mobile phone operating system and applications suite for the feature phone segment. Smarterphone OS, then called Mimiria, was first unveiled at the Mobile World Congress show in February 2008, and was used for such handsets as the Kyocera C4700, Vibo T588, and the Madrid LiMo device. The Smarterphone architecture was clean-room, with a very strict model-view-controller design that enabled variations to be implemented with little effort. The user interface of Smarterphone OS was programmed in a scripting language, which was a variant of Scheme with object-oriented extensions.

Smarterphone OS included a user interface (MMI) software stack, implementing a full user interface and middleware for 2G and 3G feature phones. It also integrated a range of third-party modules such as Java ME JVM from Oracle Corporation, mobile browser from Obigo, MMS and SMS stack from Mobile Messaging Factory, predictive text input from Nuance and CooTek, and handwriting recognition from Sinovoice.

== Nokia Asha platform ==
Nokia's Asha Platform inherits capabilities from Smarterphone.
