= TouchPal =

Alternative input method for mobile devices

- Developer: CooTek
- Release: October 2007
- Website: www.touchpal.com

TouchPal is an alternative input method for mobile devices, designed and developed by Shanghai-based CooTek. It is a software application running on multiple platforms, including Android, iOS (no longer supported, only maintained), Windows Mobile, and Windows 8. It simulates a keyboard on the screen of the device, which is used to enter text by tapping on the screen or sliding a finger between letters to construct the word. It is an optional text input method to the traditional physical keyboards and default keyboards provided by the device manufacturer.

== Technology ==
TouchPal default keyboard layout is designed based on the "T+" technology that combines two letters and one symbol on each key, whose layout looks like a T. The overall layout of all the letters follows a common computer keyboard layout, which is the QWERTY layout.

It also has a word-predicting technology that predicts the most probable word or its spelling.

== Ad practices ==
In June 2019, it was revealed that CooTek, the developer of TouchPal, was bundling malicious adware with its keyboard software and taking steps to conceal its involvement. Google subsequently banned CooTek from the Google Play Store.

== History ==
=== TouchPal v1 ===
TouchPal v1 was released in October 2007. It only provided the T+ layout virtual keyboard with a one-layer design. There wasn't any additional function keys such as Shift or Ctrl, because the functions they achieve are built-in and can be easily implemented by finger tapping or sliding. It has many useful features, such as self-defined sentences (My Sentences), My Commands, drag & drop buttons, and comprehensive content editing functions. It only supports English input.

=== TouchPal v2 ===
TouchPal v2 was released in late December 2007. Apart from what the v1 had to offer, its virtual keyboard was resizable by finger sliding. It also included customizable emoticons and a few other features. It also added support for several European languages, such as English, German, French, Italian, Spanish, and Dutch.

=== TouchPal v3 ===
TouchPal v3 English version was released in April 2008, together with extra European input languages. The TouchPal v3 Chinese input version was released one month later.

Compared with the previous two versions, TouchPal v3 underwent significant changes. It supported three layouts on one virtual keyboard: the T+ layout, the full QWERTY layout, and the 9-key PhonePad layout. Users can switch keyboard layouts by finger sweeping. There was also an animation effect when turning the pages or switching the layouts. TouchPal v3 significantly improved the predictive algorithm by incorporating its patent pending context-based word prediction and mistyping auto-correction algorithm. Overall, it was much more extensible than the previous two versions. With its SDK, users can self develop the supported input languages, the skins, and change the keyboard layout. It also provided changeable keypress sounds.

=== TouchPal v4 & v5 ===
In November 2008, CooTek started to release TouchPal for Android devices with its initial version (v4) mainly shipped for manufacturer. Five months later, in April 2009, CooTek launched the official public release of TouchPal v4.2.

Almost two years later, in June 2011, TouchPal Curve v4.7.6 was unveiled.

In September 2011, CooTek launched TouchPal v5.0 with milestone upgrading.

=== TouchPal X ===
In September 2013, TouchPal X v 5.4.5 released with various added features, such as TouchPal Wave, TouchPal Curve®, Symbol and Number quick input, Emoji X, Contextual prediction and Walkie-Talkie style voice input.
