= Partiosanomalaite =

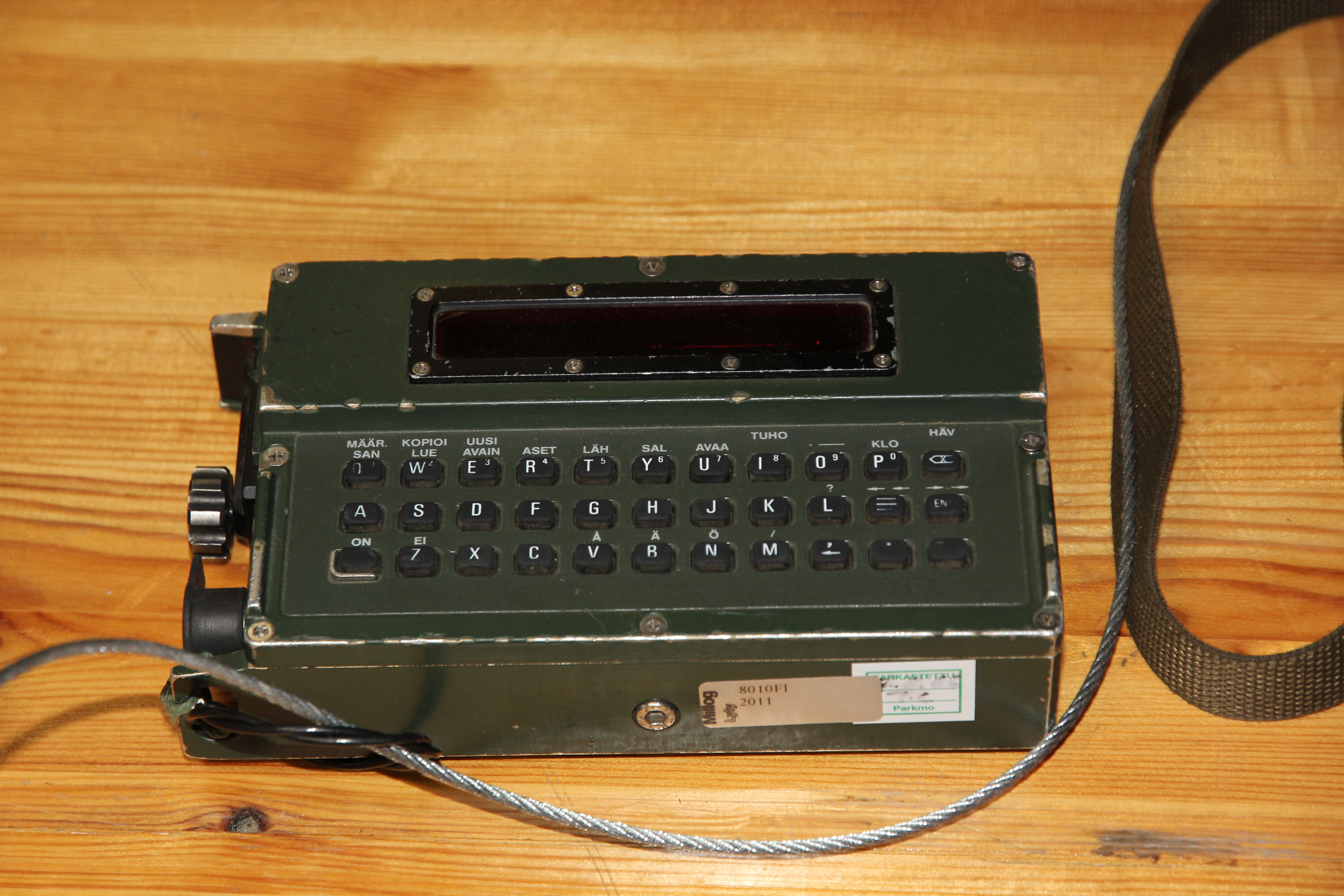
Partiosanomalaite

In the Finnish Army, a Partiosanomalaite m/83 (Parsa) is a compact communications device for reconnaissance units. It was developed around 1984 by Nokia and worked with telephone and high frequency, very high frequency and ultra high frequency radio equipment over standard voice channels. It was later used by other countries, including NATO members. The unit featured a keypad with circular (later rectangular) rubber keys and a 16-character LED display. It was powered by six internal AA batteries or by an external direct current source. It had a 2000-character memory for sent and received messages and was shock- and water-proof. Messages were encrypted using a Data Encryption Standard algorithm. It remained in use by the Finnish Air Force until at least 2022.

The device can send free- and limited length messages, but writing is more inconvenient than with a proper messaging device, for example for communicating fire commands two buttons need to be pressed.

== Determined length messages ==
- 1 TUKOM Fire control
- 2 KORJAUS Altering fix to match enemy movements
- 3 TUSII Fix target change
- 4 MÄÄRITÄ Determine target
- 5 KT HAV 1 Contacts with respect to target
- 6 KT HAV 2 Contacts with respect to fire control
- 7 MAALILUETTELO (Target list)
- 8 ILMOITTAUTUMINEN (Reporting/Withdraw from messaging position)
- 9 TIEDUSTELUTIETOJA (Recon data)
- 0 LIIKENTEENLASKENTA (General traffic count)

== Capabilities ==
- The keyboard has 33 characters that can perform all possible functions.
- 16 character LED-display
- Transmit memory 2000 characters.
- Receive memory 8 messages or 2000 characters.
- Can send morse messages.
- Powered by 6 AA-batteries.
- Weight ~1 kg.
- Partiosanomalaite was designed and is manufactured by Nokia.
