= Signe Hebbe =

Swedish operatic soprano and instructor

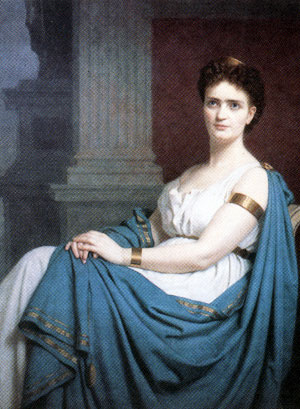
Signe Hebbe, circa 1890 by Amalia Lindegren.

Signe Amanda Georgina Hebbe (30 July 1837 – 14 February, 1925) was a Swedish operatic soprano and instructor.

== Life ==
Signe Hebbe was born in Värnamo to the journalist Vendela Hebbe and Clemens Hebbe.

=== Education ===
In 1848, at the age of eleven, she was enrolled at the school of the Royal Swedish Opera. She was a student of Karolina Bock and studied music at the Lindblad piano school. In 1852–1854, she was a student at the conservatory in Berlin.

Signe Hebbe made her debut as an actress at the Royal Dramatic Theatre in 1855. She was not given good reviews in spoken drama, and therefore resumed her studies in singing.

In 1856, she was enrolled as a student at the Paris conservatory. She was the first student from Scandinavia to be given an award at the Paris conservatory. She gave lessons in "plastic" (mimic) herself and, in 1860, came to act as the instructor of Sarah Bernhardt, when she replaced Bernhardt's ordinary teacher Élie during his absence.

She developed her ability as a singer by studies under Francesco Lamperti in Milan, and studied acting for Adelaide Ristori and Ernesto Rossi.

=== Opera singer ===
Signe Hebbe was made her debut as an opera singer in Frankfurt. She was active in Lyon in 1861-62, and engaged at the Nationaltheater Mannheim.

Between 1864 and 1879, she toured Europe as an opera and concert singer and performed in Stockholm, Karlsruhe, Copenhagen, Théâtre Lyrique in Paris, Warsaw, Geneva, Milan, Palermo, Helsingfors (Helsinki), and Oslo.

She was criticized for her acting, because she did not follow the accepted interpretation of roles. Interested in women's issues, Signe Hebbe preferred to give women's parts in opera's a more independent and strong interpretation rather than the traditional weak interpretations, innovations which exposed her to criticism for not adjusting to the opera traditions.

=== Instructor ===
Signe Hebbe was active as a voice trainer and singing instructor from 1871 to 1925. In 1877, she opened her own school. From 1883, she was active at the Royal Dramatic Training Academy, in 1886-88 at the Royal Swedish Academy of Music, and in the years around 1900 on the Royal Dramatic Theatre.

She reportedly preferred her work at her own school. In her own school, she was an instructor in the technique in speech, singing, plastique (mimic) and role analysis. She introduced the technique of deep breathing to Sweden from Paris, where she had been given this training by François Delsarte.

She had students from all Scandinavia, Europe and the USA. Some of her notable pupils include John Forsell, Emilie Mechelin and Carolina Östberg.

She died in Stockholm in 1925 at 87 years old.

== Bibliography ==
- Österberg, Carin et al., Svenska kvinnor: föregångare, nyskapare (Swedish women: Predecessors, pioneers). Lund: Signum 1990. (ISBN 91-87896-03-6)(Swedish)
- Nordensvan, Georg, Svensk teater och svenska skådespelare från Gustav III till våra dagar. Andra delen, 1842-1918, Bonnier, Stockholm, 1918 ['Swedish theatre and Swedish actors from Gustav III to our days. Second Book 1822–1918'] (in Swedish)
