= Leo Mechelin =

Finnish politician, academic, and businessman (1839–1914)

Baron Leo Mechelin
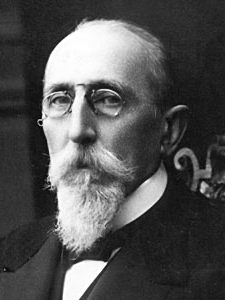
- Mechelin in the early 1900s

Personal details
- Born: Leopold Henrik Stanislaus Mechelin; 24 November 1839 Hamina, Grand Duchy of Finland, Russian Empire
- Died: 26 January 1914 (aged 74) Helsinki, Grand Duchy of Finland, Russian Empire
- Party: Independent (after 1885)
- Other political affiliations: Liberal Party (1880–1885)
- Spouse: Cecilia Lindroos
- Children: 3
- Relatives: Emilie Mechelin (sister)
- Education: University of Helsinki (BPhil, MPhil, LLB, PhD)
- Occupation: Politician; professor; businessman
- Known for: Leader of the constitutionalist movement; Co-founder of Nokia

Leopold Henrik Stanislaus Mechelin (24 November 1839 – 26 January 1914), known as Leo Mechelin, was a Finnish politician, professor, liberal reformer and businessman. A leading defender of the autonomy of the Grand Duchy of Finland, and of the rights of women and minorities, Mechelin's 1905–1908 government ("Mechelin's Senate") made Finland the first nation in the world with the universal right to vote and to be elected. During his period in office the freedom of expression, the press, and of assembly were introduced. Mechelin was born and died in Helsinki, Finland.

== Early life and education ==
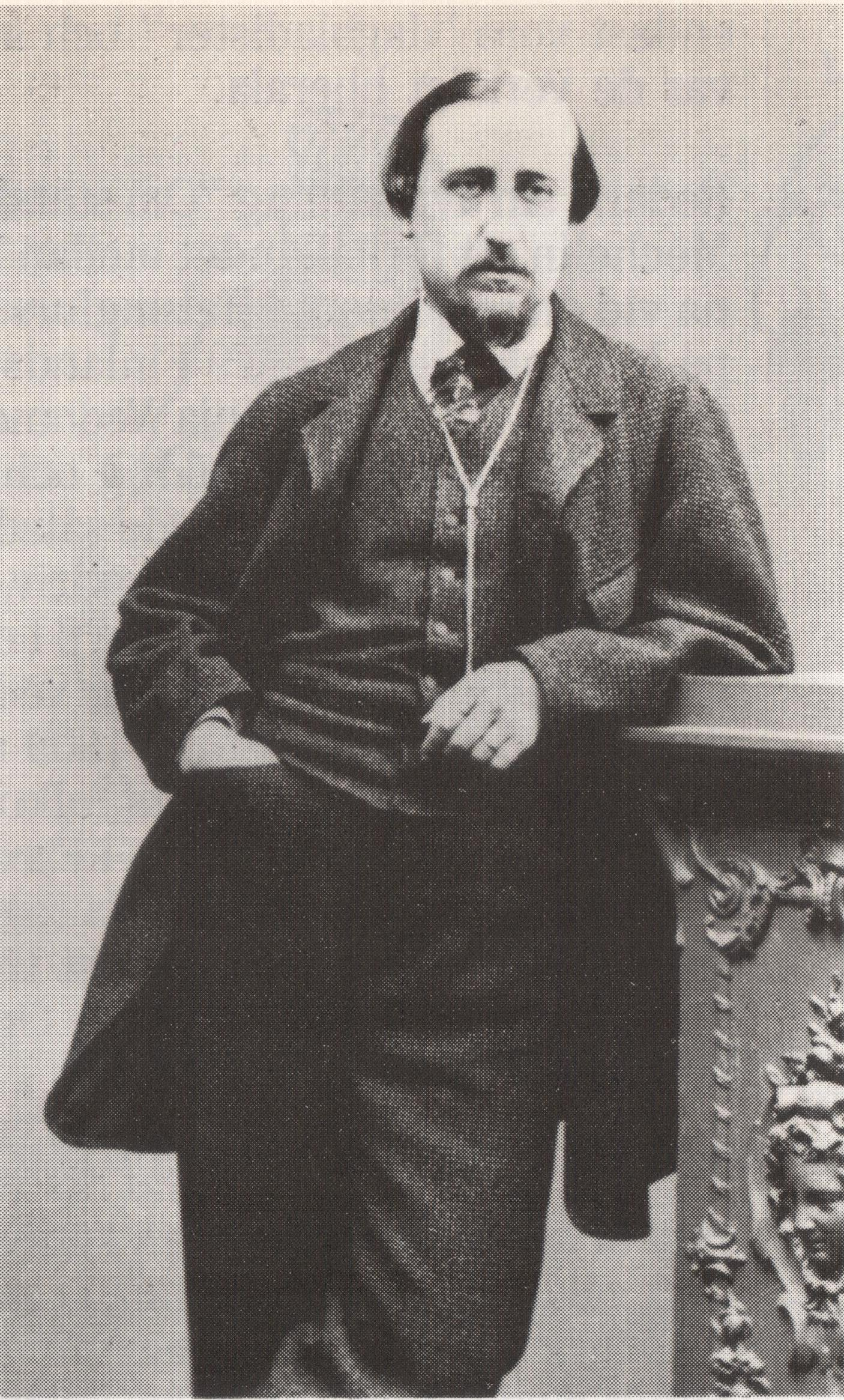
Leo Mechelin in 1866

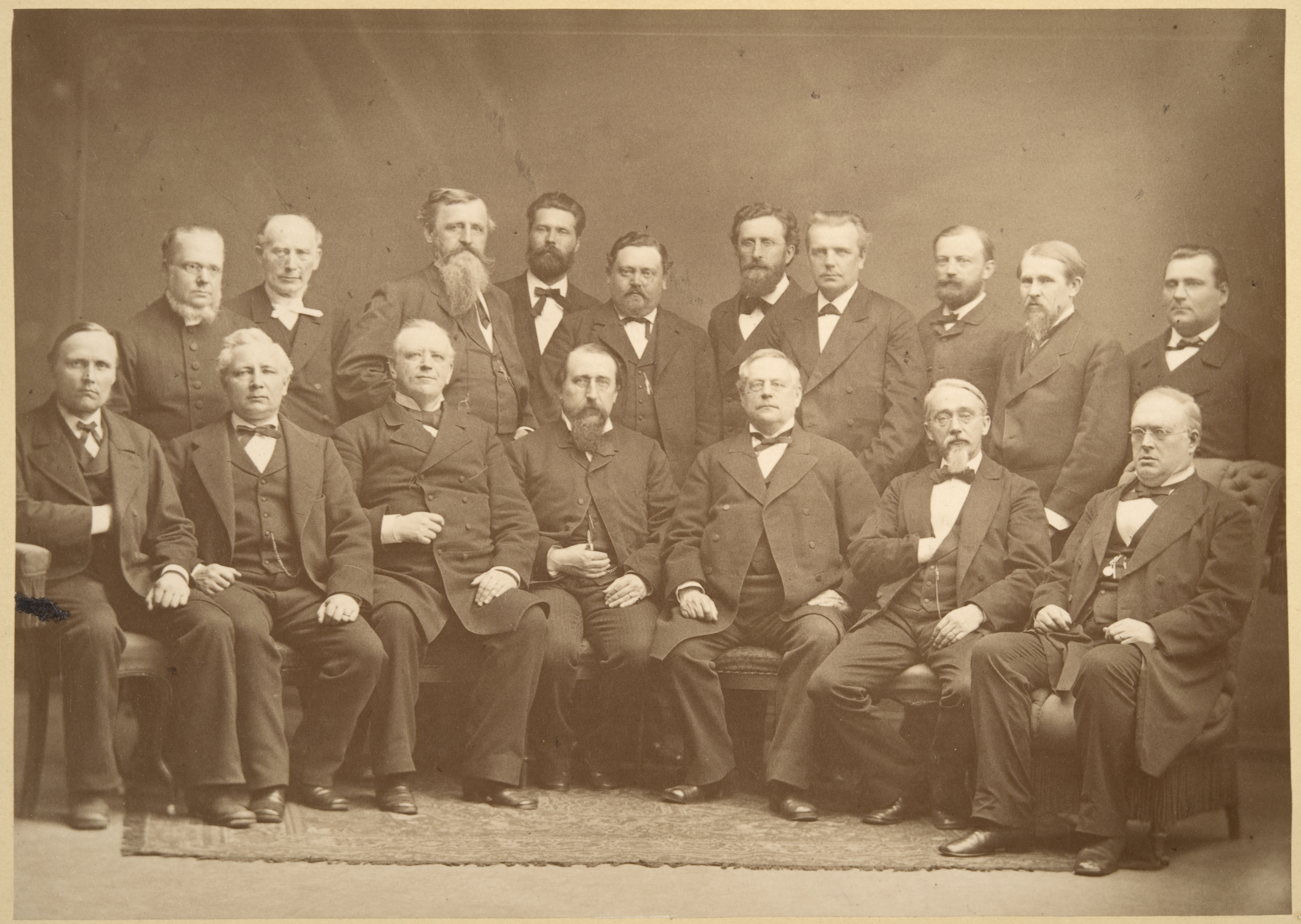
1882 Diet of Finland Finance Committee

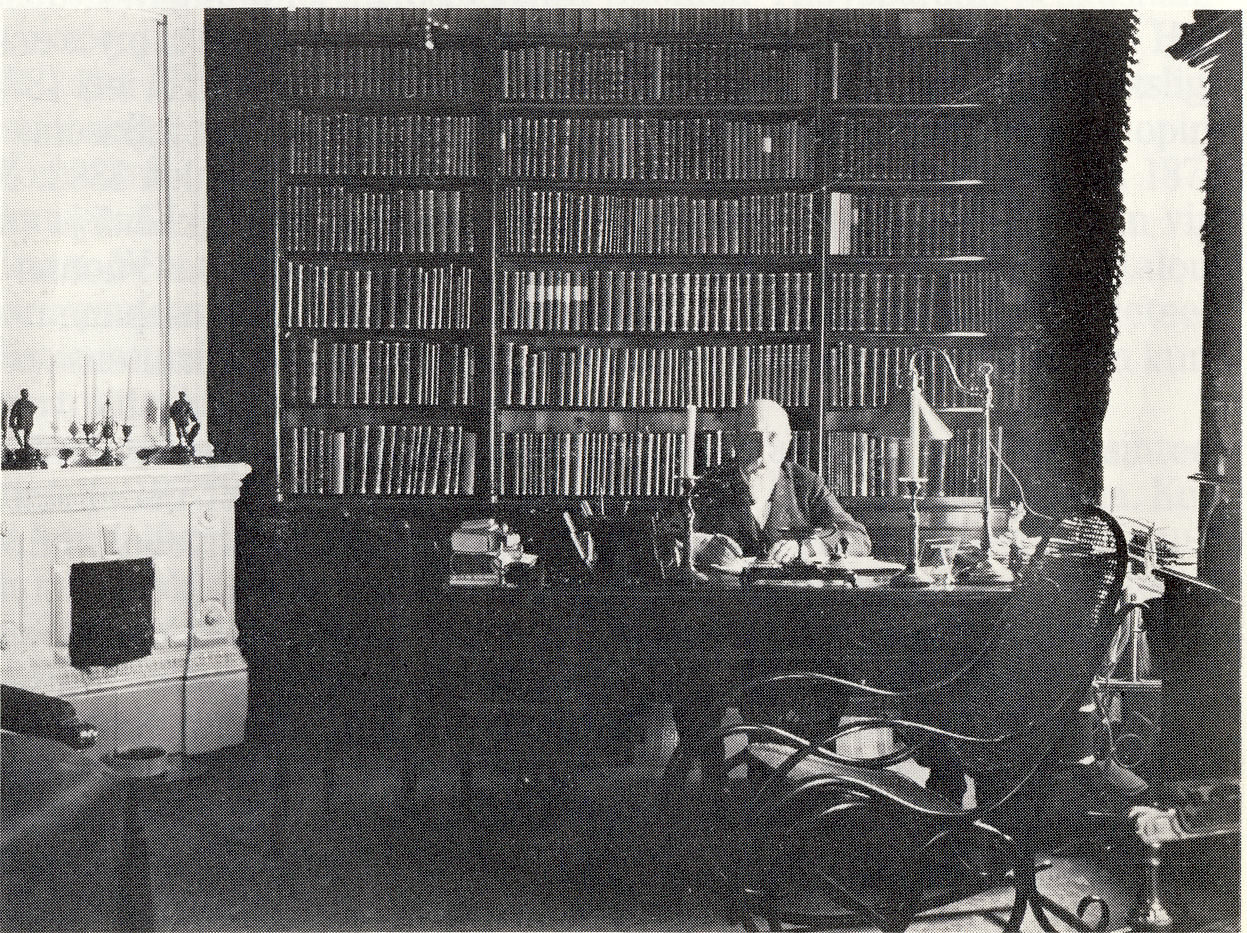
Leo Mechelin in his office

Born in Hamina in 1839, the son of Gustaf Johan Mechelin and Amanda Gustava Costiander, Leo Mechelin studied at the University of Helsinki, gaining his bachelor's and master's degrees in philosophy in 1860, a bachelor's degree in law in 1864, and a license and doctorate in 1873.

== Career ==
As professor of jurisdiction and politology 1874–82, Mechelin had argued that the tsars were bound by the old constitutional laws from the time of the Swedish rule of Finland (before 1809), and hence affirmed that Finland was a separate, constitutional state, which the tsar could only rule by law, whereas in Russia he had absolute power.

During the periods of oppression, the tsar tried to impose unconstitutional laws, which Mechelin opposed. The unrests in Russia and Finland (1905) finally compelled the tsar to comply with the November Manifesto written by Mechelin. This allowed Mechelin to form a government (1905–1908) and to transform Finland into what was in many respects the first liberal democracy (e.g., in New Zealand women already had the right to vote but not to be voted into office; in Australia only white people had those rights) in 1906. In 1907, the first universal elections to the one-chamber parliament ("eduskunta") were held, and 19 of its 200 first members were women. However, the constitutionals of all parties did not obtain the majority of seats, and the tsar realised that he could carry on with the oppression, starting the second period of oppression (1908–1917). After Mechelin's death in 1914, the two revolutions in Russia allowed Finland to declare its independence (1917) and Mechelin's younger co-workers were able to complete his work.

He also founded the Liberal Party of Finland (1880–1885), wrote its program, was one of the founders of the Union Bank of Finland 1862 (now part of Nordea Bank) and co-founded the Nokia Company (1871) with Fredrik Idestam, was the first chairman of the town council of Helsinki (1875–1876 and 1892–1899) and an internationally respected expert on politology and member of peace movement. Emperor Alexander II ennobled Mechelin 1876.

Mechelin led the passive resistance in Finland during the first period of oppression (1899–1905) until and even after his banishment (1903), from which officials had to let him return as a member of parliament (House of Nobles) 1904, welcomed by a celebrating crowd of 10,000 people. In a secret meeting of the Kagaali, Mechelin had written a petition against the draft of Finns to the Russian army, which collected almost 500,000 signatures. His coalition, the Constitutionals, managed to end the draft through boycott.

Finnish sculptor Walter Runeberg made a sculpture of Mechelin's bust for his 70th birthday. Today the statue sits on the steps to the House of the Estates, which is a major governmental building in central Helsinki.

Nokia, a mobile phone corporation, was founded by Mechelin and his student days' roommate Fredrik Idestam as a forestry company.

Later, Mechelin's wish to expand into the electricity business was at first thwarted by Idestam's opposition, but Mechelin managed to convince most shareholders of his plans and became the company chairman (1898–1914), thus being able to realise his visions.

Mechelin was active in civil society and President of the current University of Art and Design Helsinki and of the Finnish Art Society. As a politician he was always highly respected among all parties and citizens, although after the dissolution of the Liberal Party (1885) he never joined any other party. Mechelin demanded peaceful nonviolent resistance and did not bend even during hard times.

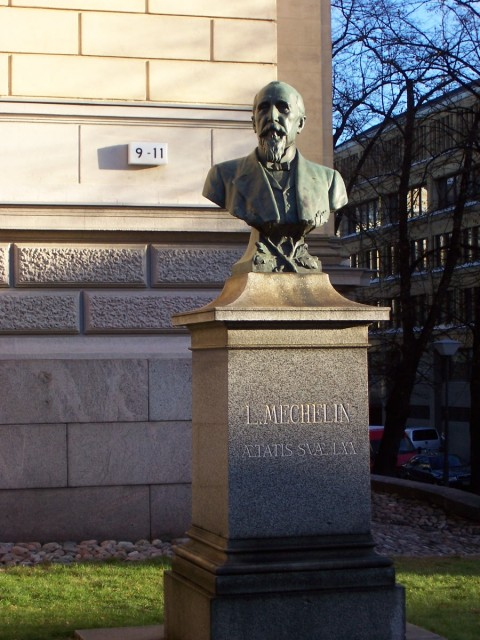
Leo Mechelin's bust in Helsinki.

Leo Mechelin has received several accolades and honorary dedications following the Russian revolutions and the Finnish Declaration of Independence, including several streets named after him such as Mechelininkatu (in Helsinki) and Mechelinintie (in Hamina).

== Personal life ==
One of his siblings was the opera singer Emilie Mechelin.
