= Twango =

Online media sharing site

Twango's logo.

Twango was an online media sharing site that supported multiple file types such as photos, video, audio, and documents. Founded in 2004 by Jim Laurel, Philip Carmichael, Randy Kerr, Serena Glover and Michael Laurel in Redmond, Washington, it provided users a means of repurposing their media, including sharing, editing, organizing and categorizing. In addition, Twango saved all the original media and its metadata (this includes, but is not limited to, IPTC and Exif). Non-members were free to browse the site, however only members could upload media to the site. Sign up for a basic account was free, and provided 250 megabytes of upload bandwidth a month.

Twango was acquired by Nokia in July 2007. In February 2008, Nokia rebranded Twango as Share on Ovi. With the rebranding, the 250 megabyte upload limit was removed. Subsequently, Share on Ovi was rebranded to Ovi Share to conform with the other Ovi services, such as Ovi Mail, Ovi Maps and Ovi Music.

On 7 March 2012, Nokia announced that Ovi Share will be discontinued and closed on 30 May 2012.

== Notable Features ==
=== Channels ===
Twango users organize their media in containers known as channels. A user's entire media collection is stored in what is known as "My Media". Channels represent a cross-section of "My Media". The same piece of media can appear in multiple channels, giving a different context to said media. For example, a picture of friends at a party could appear in a user's "friends" channel as well as in the user's "party" channel. Twango members can subscribe to a channel, receiving notifications when new media has been uploaded to a channel or when new comments have been added. Each channel can also be specified as public or private. If it is specified as private it can only be accessed by invitation. Users can also create open channels which allow other users to upload their own content.

=== Upload methods ===
Twango members can upload their media in a variety of ways. Users can upload via the website, either through a basic upload interface where the user browses for files to upload one at a time, or through a web based drag and drop uploader which enables them to upload multiple files at once by dragging them from a folder on their machine and onto the browser (this requires ActiveX or Java).

In addition to browser based uploading, Twango also supports uploading through email, mobile phone, and the Windows web publishing wizard.

=== Twidgets ===
A twango twidget is an embedded snippet of code (currently Flash or JavaScript) that can be added to a user's blog. For example, a user can embed a Flash ticker on his or her blog which will display all the media from a channel. Twango also has a webcam widget which can be embedded in blogs and provides in-place webcam comments from viewers.

=== Feeds ===
Movies and audio are condensed and played back via a Flash-based media player, but media can also be downloaded in the format it was originally uploaded in. In addition, Twango does not implement any technology to block copyrighted material, but instead relies on the community to "flag" inappropriate media. Media that has reached a certain flagging threshold is then automatically removed.

Twango supports various feeds, including channel feeds, most recent media feeds, and most popular feeds. It supports RSS 2.0, ATOM 0.3, and ATOM 1.0

=== Twango Mobile ===
Twango Mobile provides an XHTML web site for people with compatible mobile browsers. This mobile site gives access to photos, videos, audio and other media on Twango, as well as some interactivity including the ability to add comments and share media to mobile numbers and email addresses.

== Acquisition by Nokia ==
In July 2007, Nokia and Twango announced that Nokia was acquiring substantially all of the assets of Twango. Shortly after the acquisition, Nokia announced that it was moving into the services field with the introduction of Ovi. The Twango software was one of the first elements of the Ovi platform introduced by Nokia.

On 7 March 2012, Nokia announced that Ovi Share will be discontinued and closed on 30 May 2012.

== See also ==
- Video hosting service
- Image hosting service
- Photo sharing
- Nokia Corporation
- List of acquisitions by Nokia
