= Emilie Mechelin =

Finnish opera singer (1838–1917)

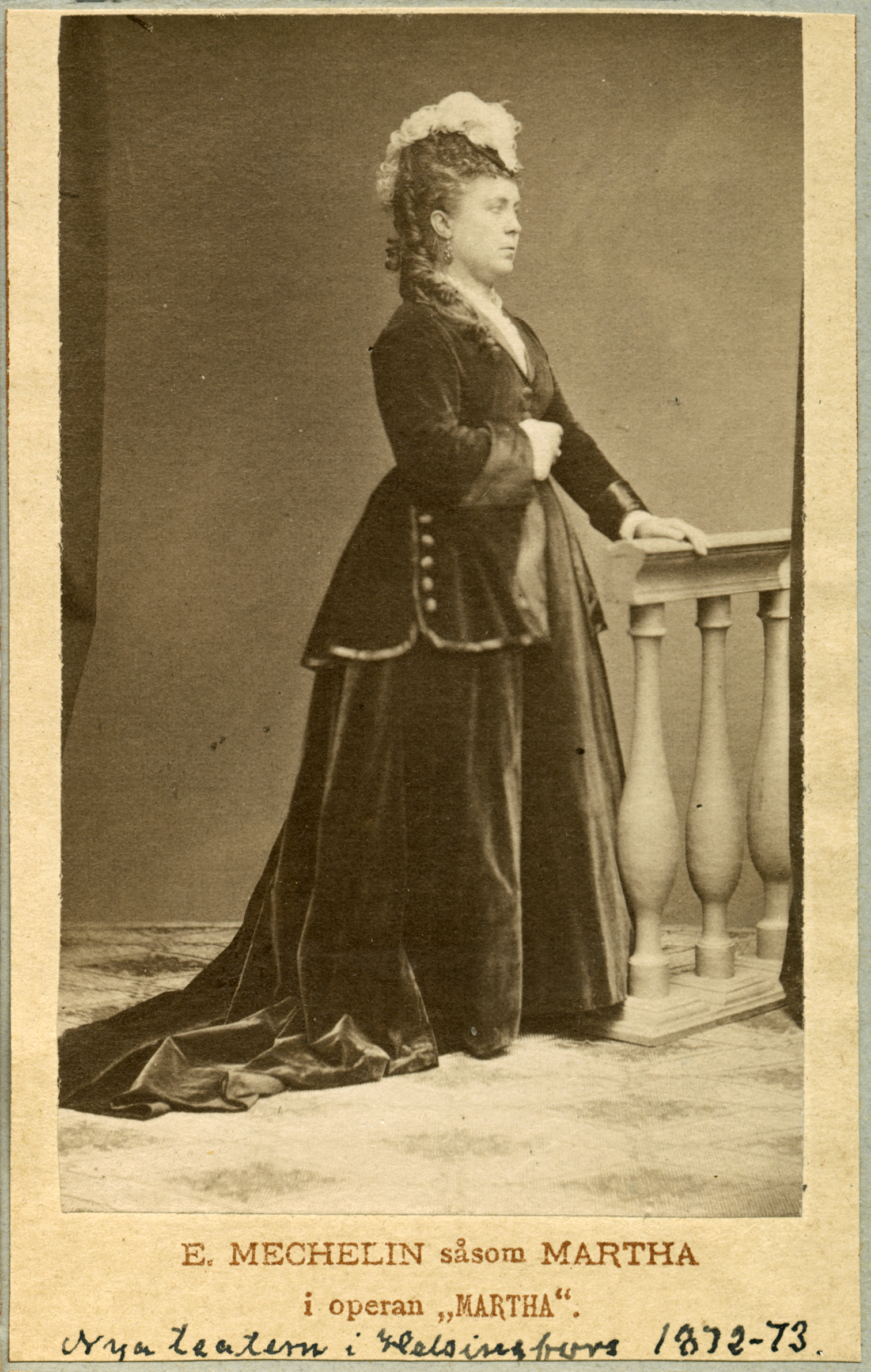
- Mechelin in the title role of Martha in 1872

Background information
- Born: 8 April 1838; Hamina, Grand Duchy of Finland
- Died: 22 December 1917 (aged 79) Hamina, Finland
- Genres: Opera

Emilie Mechelin (8 April 1838 – 22 December 1917) was a Finnish operatic soprano and pedagogue. She was the first singing teacher of the Helsinki School of Music (later to become Sibelius Academy).

== Early life and education ==
Johanna Sofia Emilie Mechelin was born to an upper-class family in Hamina in the Grand Duchy of Finland, the eldest of five children of Valtioneuvos ('Councillor of State') Gustaf Johan Mechelin and Amanda née Sagulin. One of Emilie's brothers is Leo Mechelin, who later became an economist, academic and statesman.

Mechelin trained in Paris in 1865–67 and 1869–70 under leading pedagogues of the time, including Pauline Viardot. In 1873–74 she was taught in Stockholm by Signe Hebbe. She also studied for a time in Germany.

== Career ==
Although there was no permanent opera house in Finland at the time, Mechelin performed at the Swedish Theatre and the Arkadia Theatre in at least six productions. She also performed at the Royal Dramatic Theatre in Stockholm, as well as touring extensively in Finland and Scandinavia.

Mechelin taught singing from early on, with her pupils including Emma Engdahl-Jägerskiöld, Emmy Achté and Ida Basilier-Magelssen.

In 1882, Mechelin was appointed the first teacher of voice at the Helsinki School of Music (Helsingin Musiikkiopisto), which post she held until 1885, when she moved to Kristiania (now Oslo) and later to Stockholm to continue her teaching career.

In the latter part of her career, Mechelin gave up singing almost entirely, dedicating herself instead to giving private lessons. She occasionally performed at concerts until the age of 60, by which time her voice had changed to mezzo-soprano.
