= MikroMikko =

1980s Finnish line of microcomputers

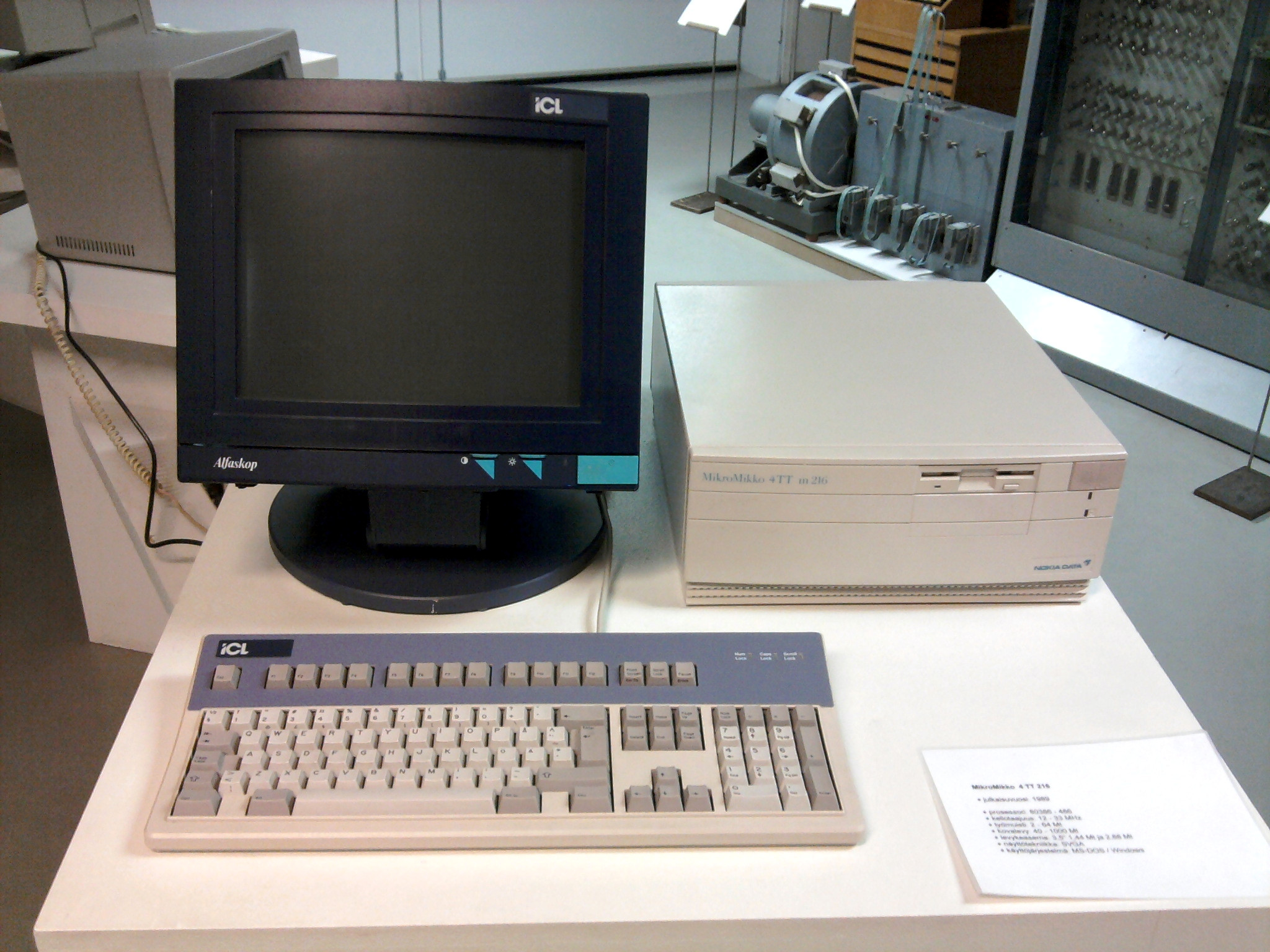
MikroMikko 4 TT m216 desktop computer

MikroMikko was a Finnish line of microcomputers released by Nokia Corporation's computer division Nokia Data from 1981 through 1987. MikroMikko was Nokia Data's attempt to enter the business computer market. They were especially designed for good ergonomy.

== History ==
The first model in the line, MikroMikko 1, was released on 29 September 1981, 48 days after IBM introduced its Personal Computer. The launch date of MikroMikko 1 is the name day of Mikko in the Finnish almanac. The MikroMikko line was manufactured in a factory in the Kilo district of Espoo, Finland, where computers had been produced since the 1960s. Nokia later bought the computer division of the Swedish telecommunications company Ericsson.

During Finland's economic depression in the early 1990s, Nokia streamlined many of its operations and sold many of its less profitable divisions to concentrate on its key competence of telecommunications. Nokia's personal computer division was sold to the British computer company ICL (International Computers Limited) in 1991, which later became part of Fujitsu. However, ICL and later Fujitsu retained the MikroMikko trademark in Finland. Internationally the MikroMikko line was marketed by Fujitsu under the trademark ErgoPro.

Fujitsu later transferred its personal computer operations to Fujitsu Siemens Computers, which shut down its only factory in Espoo at the end of March 2000, thus ending large-scale PC manufacturing in the country.

== Models ==
=== MikroMikko 1 M6 ===
- Processor: Intel 8085, 2 MHz
- 64 KB RAM, 4 KB ROM
- Display: 80×24 character text mode, the 25th row was used as a status row. Graphics resolutions 160×75 and 800×375 pixels, refresh rate 50 Hz
- Two 640 KB 5.25" floppy drives (other models might only have one drive)
- Optional 5 MB hard disk (stock in model M7)
- Connectors: two RS-232s, display, printer, keyboard
- Software: Nokia CP/M 2.2 operating system, Microsoft BASIC, editor, assembler and debugger
- Cost: 30,000 mk in 1984

=== MikroMikko 2 ===
- Released in 1983
- Processor: Intel 80186
- Partly MS-DOS compatible, used Nokia's own version of MS-DOS 2.x

=== MikroMikko 3 ===
- Released in 1986
- PC/AT compatible
- Processor: 6 or 8 MHz Intel 80286
- Hercules monitor
- Six extension card slots
- Mouse
- Cost: 47,950 mk

=== MikroMikko 3 TT ===
- Team workstation, released in spring 1987
- Processor: 8 MHz Intel 80286
- 1 MB RAM
- Two extension card slots
- One or two 3.5" 720 KB floppy drives
- Optional 20 MB hard disk
- MS-DOS 3.2 operating system
- Cost: with one floppy drive 21,500 mk, two drives 23,000 mk, one floppy drive and 20 MB hard disk 25,900 mk

=== MikroMikko 3 TT M125 ===
- Processor: 33 MHz Intel 80386DX
- 4 MB RAM
- 1.44 MB 3.5" floppy drive
- 40 MB hard disk
- Connectors: display, keyboard, mouse, RS-232 serial port, Centronics printer port
- Software: MS-DOS 5.0 operating system

=== Laptop computers ===
- MikroMikko 4m310
- MikroMikko N3/25x

== Tiimi workgroup system ==
The "Tiimi" workgroup system was a local area network consisting of MikroMikko workstations and servers, popular in the late 1980s. The servers were MPS-10s or MikroMikko models 2 and 3. The workstations were MikroMikko 3TT and PääteMikko computers. At least SQL/DMS database software and NOSS document manager software was available.
