= Fredrik Idestam =

Finnish mining engineer, founder of Nokia (1838–1916)

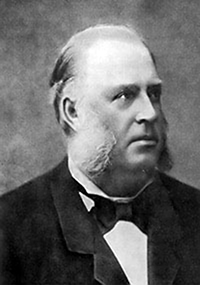
Fredrik Idestam

Knut Fredrik Idestam (28 October 1838, Tyrväntö, Grand Duchy of Finland – 8 April 1916, Helsinki) was a Finnish mining engineer and businessman, best known as a founder of Nokia. He is considered the father of the wood-based paper industry in Finland, having introduced groundwood pulp technology from Germany and establishing the first commercially successful groundwood mill in the country. He also played a decisive role in organising the Finnish paper industry through the founding of several trade associations.

== Biography ==
=== Early life and education ===
Idestam's father Gustaf was a mining official, and Fredrik followed in his footsteps by studying for a career in mining administration. After obtaining his degree, he received a senate scholarship to study at the Freiberg Mining Academy in Saxony in 1863–1864, during which time he was appointed an official at the Finnish Board of Mines.

On his return journey from Freiberg in the summer of 1864, Idestam visited a groundwood mill in the Harz mountains. It was a new invention — a small factory producing paper raw material from wood, using a process and machinery developed by paper manufacturer Heinrich Voelter. The mill Idestam visited was already a commercially viable operation. He immediately grasped the significance of the technology for Finland: the forests provided abundant raw material, and the country's rapids could serve as power sources. Upon returning to Finland, he ordered a set of Voelter machines from Germany.

=== Groundwood mill in Tampere ===
On 12 May 1865, Idestam obtained a concession from the senate to establish a groundwood mill at the lower falls of the Tammerkoski rapids in Tampere — a date that Nokia considers its official founding date. The mill began operations in early 1866.

Idestam was not the first in Finland to attempt groundwood production: pharmacist Achates Thuneberg had founded a mill near Vyborg as early as 1860, using equipment developed independently of Voelter. However, Thuneberg's mill performed poorly and the small enterprise soon ceased operations. Idestam succeeded where Thuneberg had failed, and found followers.

Like Voelter in Germany, Idestam had to actively market his product. Papermakers and consumers regarded groundwood pulp as inferior to rag pulp. At the Frenckell paper mill in Tampere, Idestam had paper produced from a mixture of equal parts rag pulp and his own groundwood. In December 1866, Tampereen Sanomat became the first newspaper in Finland to be printed on this wood-containing paper, with Helsingfors Dagblad soon following suit. Idestam demonstrated his groundwood pulp at the Paris World Exhibition in 1867, receiving a bronze medal — a breakthrough he later considered decisive.

=== Nokia Ltd ===
In 1871, Idestam incorporated his business and together with his close friend Leo Mechelin founded Nokia Ltd, transferring all operations to Nokia near Tampere. Mechelin played an important role in raising capital and financing for the venture. Idestam resigned from his position at the Board of Mines and the Mint, and devoted himself entirely to Nokia Ltd. He held just over half of the shares.

Under Idestam's cautious leadership, Nokia Ltd developed successfully. Unlike many other industrial pioneers in Finland, he managed to avoid financial crises by accounting for downturns in his calculations even during periods of heavy investment. In the early 1880s, three paper machines were built at Nokia, and in 1885 Finland's first sulphite cellulose factory was established there. By the end of the 1880s, Nokia was processing all of its groundwood pulp and cellulose into paper.

Idestam stepped back from Nokia's leadership in 1896, succeeded as CEO by his brother-in-law Gustaf Fogelholm, with Leo Mechelin as chairman of the board.

=== Industry organisation ===
On Idestam's initiative and under his leadership, the paper mill owners established several trade associations: an association of groundwood paperboard manufacturers in 1874, the Groundwood Pulp Association in 1875, and the Finnish Paper Association in 1892. These were effectively cartels through which the Finnish producers divided up their most important market, Russia, and ceased competing with each other there. Idestam served as CEO and chairman of the Paper Association until 1903.

=== Later life ===
Idestam retired from the Paper Association in 1903. He died on 8 April 1916 in Helsinki and was buried in the Hietaniemi Cemetery.
