= History of Turku =

History of the city of Turku, Finland

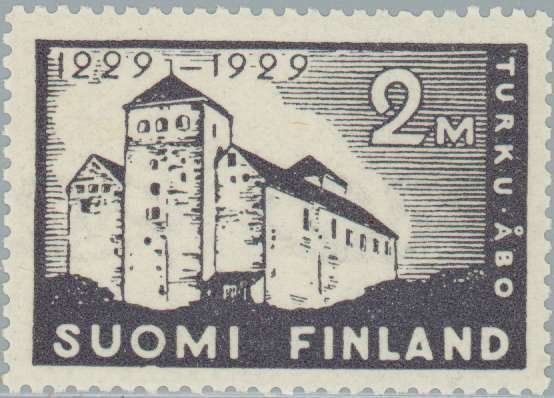
A postage stamp from 1929 depicting the medieval castle of Turku.

Turku (Swedish: Åbo) is Finland's oldest city, having been founded in 1229. The city has a history with Sweden and Russia, and now it is an important city of an independent Finland. Turku played a pivotal role during the Middle Ages as part of the Kingdom of Sweden. In the 16th century, it was the second most important city in the kingdom, after Stockholm. Turku served as the administrative, academic and religious centre of the eastern part of the Swedish kingdom, known today as Finland.

In 1809, Finland came under Russian rule with Turku serving as the capital of the Grand Duchy of Finland. In 1812, the Russians relocated the capital to Helsinki. The Great Fire of Turku in 1827 was a significant milestone in the history of the city due to its almost complete destruction. Nevertheless, Turku retained its status as the largest Finnish city until the 1840s.

Today, Turku is the primary city and population centre in Southwestern Finland. The city's population has been growing steadily as a result of the baby boom, migration from rural areas and, more recently, immigration. During the late 20th century and early 21st century, Turku has flourished as a bustling hub of commerce, academia, and tourism. The Turku region is the third largest metropolitan area in Finland.

== Prehistory ==
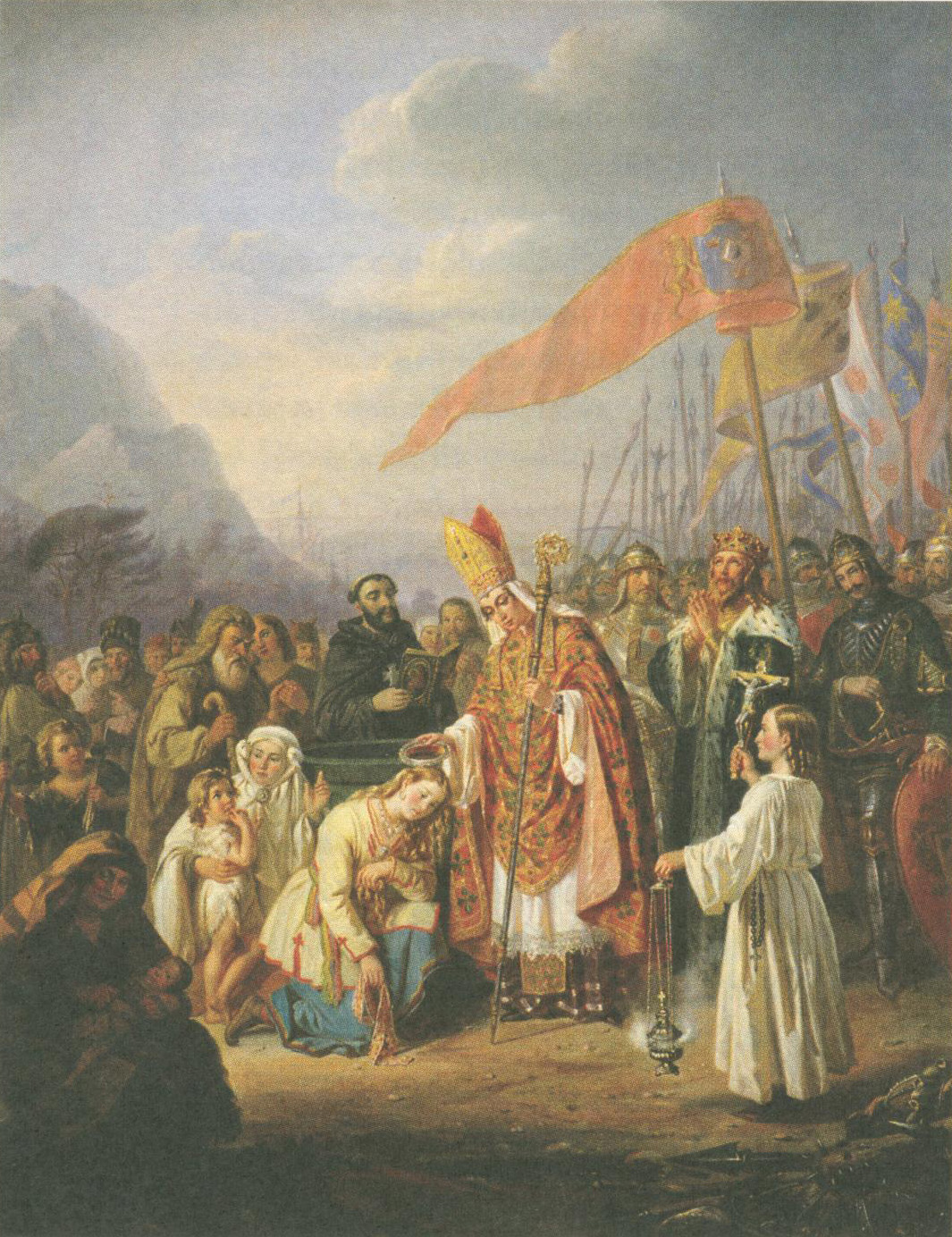
According to legend, Bishop Henrik baptised the first Finns at Turku's Kupittaa spring. The 1850s fresco in Turku Cathedral by R. W. Ekman.

Human settlement in the Turku region is relatively recent, as the southwestern part of Finland remained submerged below the sea for an extended duration due to the Ice Age. As a result of the tectonic uplift during 3000–2000 BCE, the Turku region transformed from an outlying archipelago to a shoreline. During the Iron Age, the area was densely populated as it was the most crucial agricultural part of the region. Moreover, the rivers of Raisionjoki and Aurajoki provided excellent harbor locations. In the 11th century, the Turku region began developing as a seaport, with Hämeen Härkätie serving as the first ancient road linking to inland areas.

The entire coast of south-west Finland was settled by the 12th century. Legend has it that in 1150, the English bishop Henry baptised the first Finns into Christianity. However, the initial burials of Christians can be dated back to the 10th and 11th centuries, although they do not necessarily indicate the presence of a Christian population in the area. In some instances, crosses were used purely as decoration. The first archeological indication of a church dates back to the 12th century.

Turku and the territory of present-day Finland gradually became part of Sweden during the 12th and 13th centuries. The area around Turku was densely populated, with new people arriving from the west across the Baltic Sea. Two main commodities were dried fish and furs, which were exported to Central Europe.

== Medieval city (1229–1499) ==
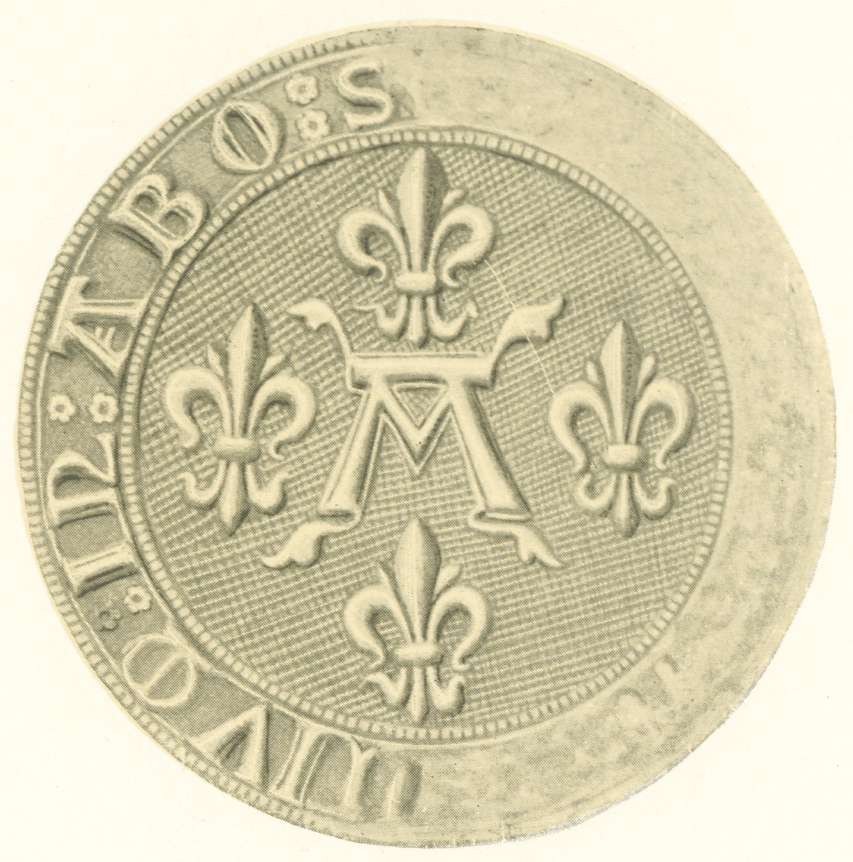
Turku town seal from 1309.

On 23 January 1229, Pope Gregory IX granted permission to move the episcopal seat from Nousiainen to Koroinen, which is presently located near the centre of Turku. The ecclesiastical centre of the diocese of Finland was situated in Nousiainen until the early 13th century with a degree of historical certainty. The written source refers to the bishop of Finland (Finlandensis episcopus). The current city of Turku regards this as the founding year. In a letter (Episcopus Aboensis) dated 24 February 1259, Pope Alexander IV first mentioned the name of Åbo (Finnish: Turku) and the bishop of Turku. No document has survived, but it is likely that Turku received its town charter at the joint initiative of the King of Sweden and the Dominican Convent of Saint Olaf (founded in 1249) at the turn of the 13th and 14th centuries.

The first town seal dates from 1309, and the town council and mayor are first mentioned in documents dating from 1323 and 1324. According to an outdated theory, there was already a settlement in Turku in the 13th century formed by German merchants, which was granted city rights at the end of the century. This settlement also included the wooden church on the Unikankare hill, which was replaced by the Cathedral. According to the old idea, the settlement also first arose around Unikankare, from where it spread to the Great Square area in the 14th century.

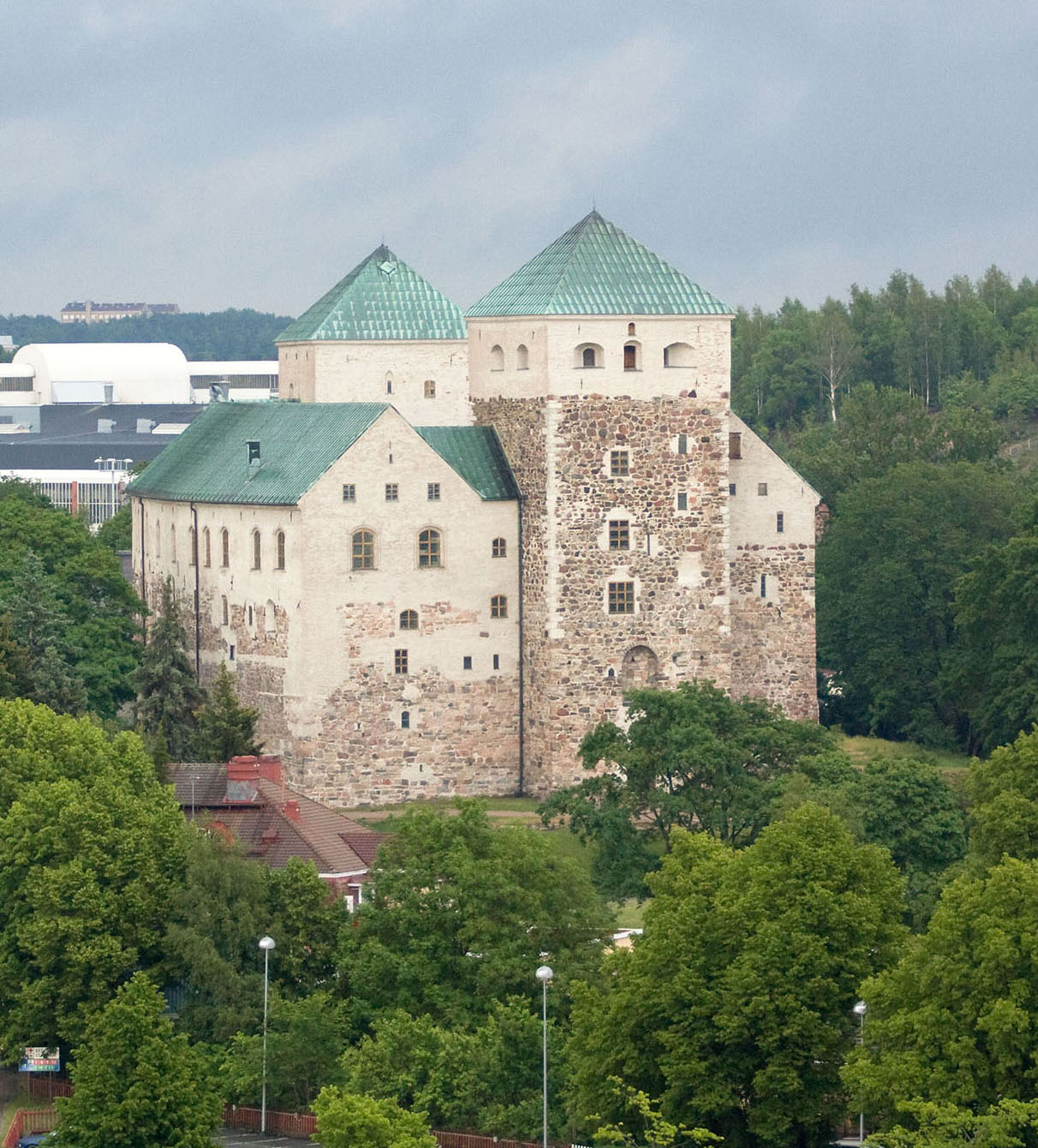
Construction of Turku Castle began at the end of the 13th century.

During the 12th and 13th centuries, Sweden, Denmark and various German entities all had a presence in Finland. Over time, Catholic Sweden gradually strengthened its position, leading to conflicts with the Orthodox Novgorod Republic. The expansion finally came to an end with the conclusion of peace in 1323. The Treaty of Nöteborg partitioned Finland into Western Catholicism and the far-eastern parts into Orthodoxy. Sweden centralized the administration of the eastern regions, i.e. present-day Finland, under Turku Castle. This resulted in Finland becoming part of Western cultural influence. Swedish law was predominant in the country, while the coastal regions were shaped by the urban culture of Germany. However, the cities situated in Finland refrained from joining the Hanseatic League, and Turku did not attain the status of a Hanseatic City.

In the 14th century, the population of the city—which at that time consisted only of single-story wooden houses—was approximately 800–900 inhabitants; two-thirds of the city's burghers were Germans, but gradually the proportion of native burghers increased. Also in the 14th century, the city of Turku declared the first annual Christmas Peace. The tradition has persisted up to the present day. In 1397, Sweden, Denmark and Norway decided to form the Kalmar Union. The alliance was controversial, however, as Denmark sought supremacy over the others. At the end of the 15th century, the Danes plundered the coasts of Finland and occupied the castles for some time. The union finally ended in 1523 when Gustav Vasa was proclaimed king of Sweden.

In the 15th century, the population of Turku increased to 2,000–3,000 inhabitants. This century witnessed a period of economic prosperity in Turku as the city engaged in profitable trade with German counterparts, including Danzig. The archdiocese of Turku had a vast administrative area, stretching east to Lake Ladoga and north to the wilds of Lapland. Until the mid-16th century, the Turku diocese was the only one in the country and the bishop had complete control over Finland's ecclesiastical administration at that time. Turku Cathedral was enlarged through the addition of extra chapels and Pennisilta ("Penny Bridge"), the first bridge over the Aura River, was built in 1414. Despite its small population, Turku emerged as one of the most significant cities in Sweden. In addition to ecclesiastical authority, Turku was also home to the only lagmans in Finland, and as early as the 15th century, the highest court in the country, the Turku County Court, convened in the city.

There is little information about everyday life in medieval Turku and, for example, social problems. Like most medieval cities, Turku must have been a fairly violent place. Death sentences were carried out much less frequently than is commonly thought, as this punishment only became common in Turku in the 17th century. Even then, death sentences were carried out in Turku at most about three times a year. The poor, the elderly and the sick could seek help from the church-run asylums. Lepers had their own St. George's Hospital, which is thought to have been located somewhere around Puolalanmäki, outside the medieval city area. In those days, there were very few people over the age of 50; infectious diseases such as measles and smallpox could be fatal, and those who survived the dangers of childhood until their twenties could live another 20–30 years.

== Modern era (1500–1808) ==
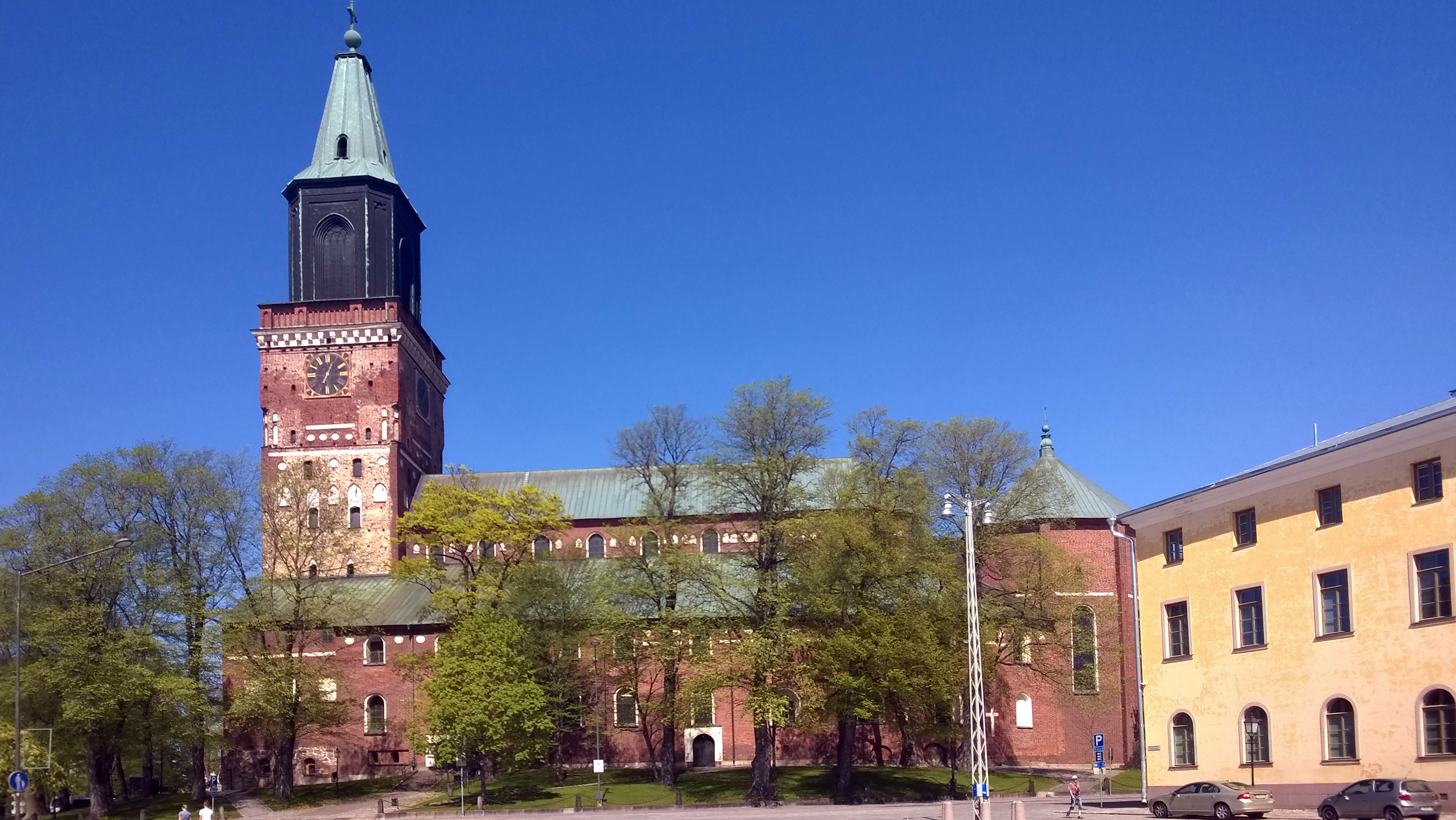
Turku Cathedral is the only surviving building from the medieval city, along with the castle.

Turku flourished as the second most important city in Sweden in the 16th century. At times it even found itself at the centre of the struggle for power in the Nordic countries. King Gustav Vasa unified the Swedish kingdom and established Stockholm as its capital. During the Reformation, the king abolished Catholicism and adopted Protestant Lutheranism as the state religion. This resulted in the reinforcement of the central government and the decline of the influence of the church.

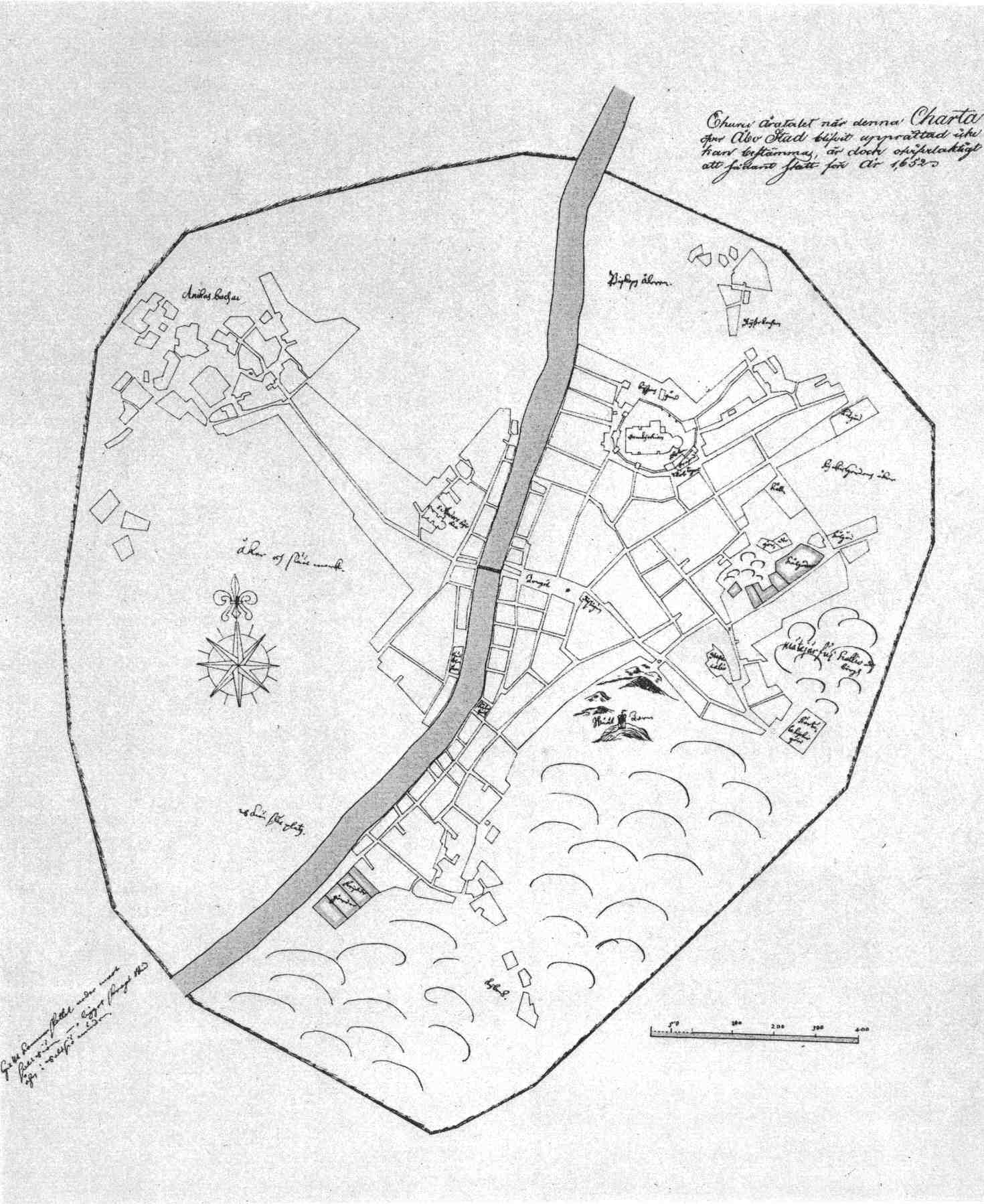
The oldest known map of Turku from 1634, drawn up by land surveyor Olof Gangius.

Duke John, the offspring of Gustav Vasa, was assigned the position of the Grand Duke of Finland. He governed Finland from Turku Castle and introduced the advances of the Renaissance. After seven years, John was imprisoned by his half-brother, Eric XIV, and transferred to the Gripsholm Castle. The tables turned six years later when Eric XIV was imprisoned in Turku Castle and compelled to step down. Duke John ascended to the throne as King John III. Apart from this, the period of rule in Turku was peaceful.

However, the conflict with Tsarist Russia continued in the east. In 1594, Sigismund III, the son of John III, ascended to the Swedish throne. His profession of the Catholic faith was regarded as a threat by the Swedish elite and the Protestant Church, leading to the emergence of Duke Charles as a dissident. This led to Duke Charles' mutiny against him. The Finnish nobility, however, remained loyal to Sigismund, which led to the siege of Turku Castle in 1597 and 1599. Finally, the Åbo bloodbath marked the end of the conflict. The Duke ascended to the throne as Charles IX.

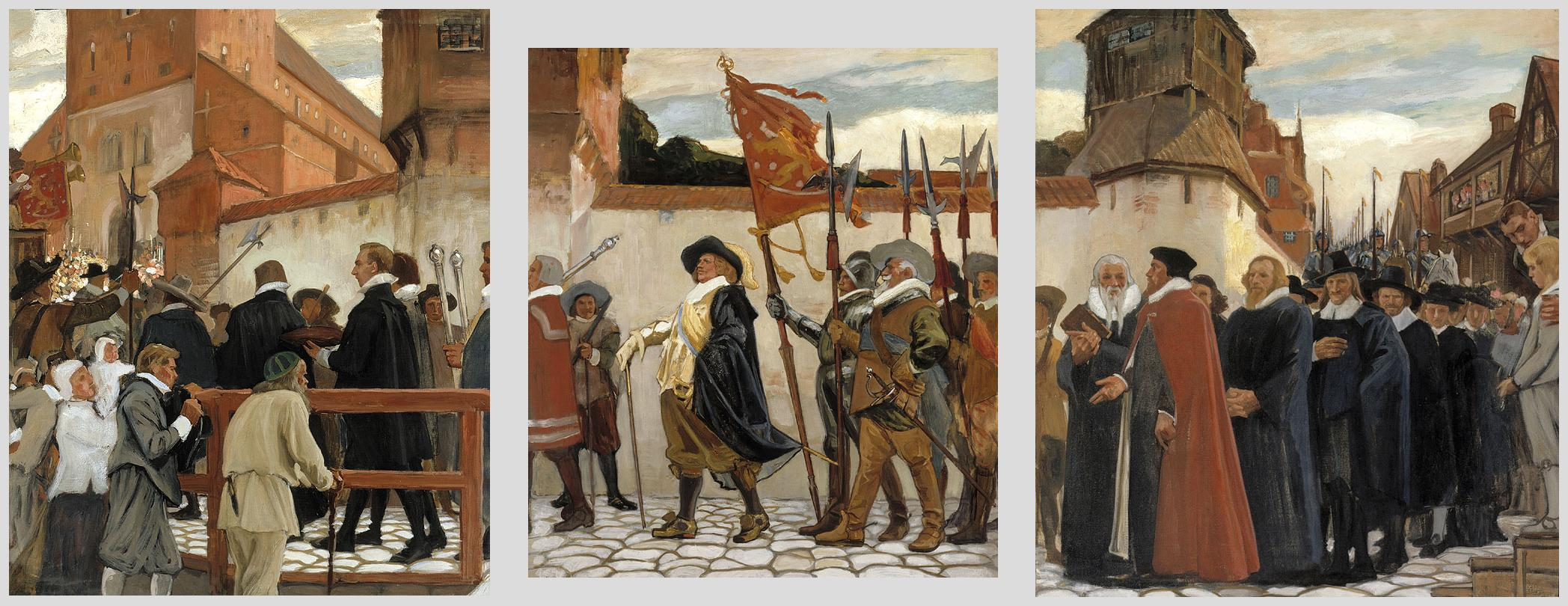
Inauguration of the Turku Academy in 1640, Albert Edelfelt (1902)

During the 17th century, Sweden emerged as a European Great Power, asserting control over the entire Baltic Sea region. Concurrently, Turku experienced significant economic growth, attracting merchants from Germany, the Netherlands and Scotland due to the kingdom's allowance of only Protestants to settle. In 1623 Turku was granted its own court of appeals (Swedish: Hovrätt), further enhancing its prosperity. To improve the administration of the Finnish region, the Governor-general was established. In 1637, Count Per Brahe was appointed as the governor-general. He established new cities in Finland and initiated the functioning of the postal service. His most significant achievement was the founding of the Turku Academy in 1640. Simultaneously, the country's first printing press started operating in Turku, which printed the initial Finnish Bible in 1642. During the 17th century, there were significant population disasters resulting in one-third of the Finnish population dying from hunger or disease. Yet, southern Finland withstood the calamities better than the north.

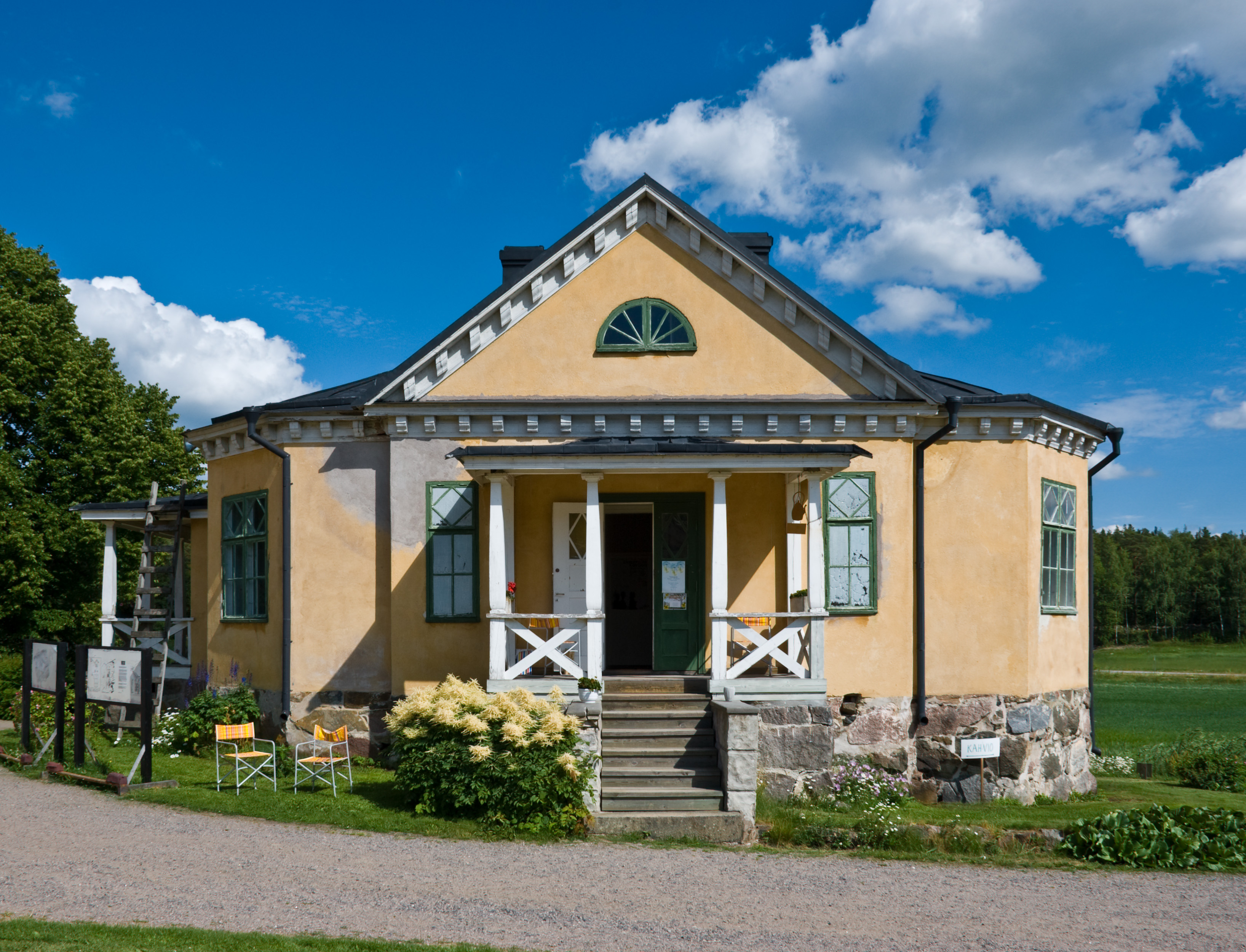
Brinkhall Manor's office and café building from the 1790s, Kakskerta Island, Turku.

During the 18th century, Sweden and Russia were embroiled in a series of conflicts that had far-reaching consequences. In 1713, Russia seized control of the entirety of Finland in what became known as the Great Northern War. This period of Russian occupation is referred to as the Great Wrath by the Finns, as it resulted in the deaths of many Finnish civilians. The 1721 Treaty of Nystad saw Sweden cede a significant portion of its eastern territories to Russia. Despite later attempts by Sweden to regain control of these territories, these efforts ultimately proved unsuccessful, and Finland was once again occupied by Russian forces in the years 1742–1743. The 1743 Treaty of Åbo resulted in Sweden ceding further territory to Russia. Swedish military defeats led to a decline in the monarchy's power and a rise in parliamentary authority. The era in Finnish and Swedish historical accounts is known as the Age of Liberty. Post-war, trade resumed and a booming shipbuilding industry emerged in Turku. Additionally, high-end goods such as tobacco and coffee began to be sold. Turku reached its pinnacle of affluence during the Gustavian era spanning the late 18th to early 19th centuries. In 1807, Europe was divided by the Treaties of Tilsit between France and Russia. As per the agreement, Finland, which was previously under Sweden's rule, was given to Russia. In the following year, the Russian army successfully conquered the eastern regions of Sweden during the Finnish War (1808–1809) without any opposition in Turku.

== Capital and Great Fire (1809–1914) ==
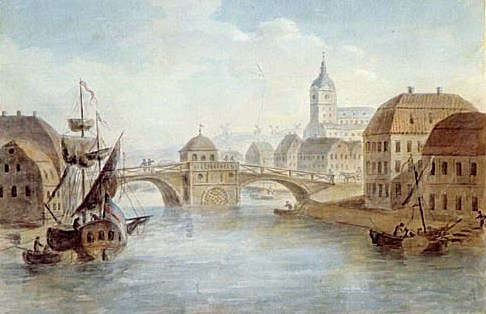
View of Turku, Gabriel Sergeev (1811).

The Russian Emperor Alexander I convened the Diet of Porvoo in 1809. The Emperor declared Finland to be annexed to the Russian Empire and to become an autonomous Grand Duchy of Finland. Finland was allowed to keep the constitutions from the time of Swedish rule, but the country was to be led by a Russian governor-general. Initially, Turku served as the capital of the new Grand Duchy. Cultural life began to contrast differences with Russianness and to emphasise Finland's own history, language and religion. In 1812 Russia moved the capital of the Grand Duchy of Finland from Turku to Helsinki. The Russians considered Turku too close to Sweden and its culture.

Losing the status of capital city dealt a severe blow to Turku. However, the Great Fire of Turku in 1827 was even more devastating. Three quarters of the city were destroyed in the largest fire in the Nordic countries. Soon after the Great Fire, it was decided that the Royal Academy, a university, would relocate to Helsinki. The rebuilding of Turku commenced subsequent to the devastating fire. The city layout was transformed from the intricate medieval buildings to a more organized grid plan by German architect C.L. Engel. This led to its development into a wooden empire style city that aligned with European ideals. The streets became quieter as public administration and the university had moved to Helsinki. Nonetheless, Turku remained Finland's most populous city until the 1840s.

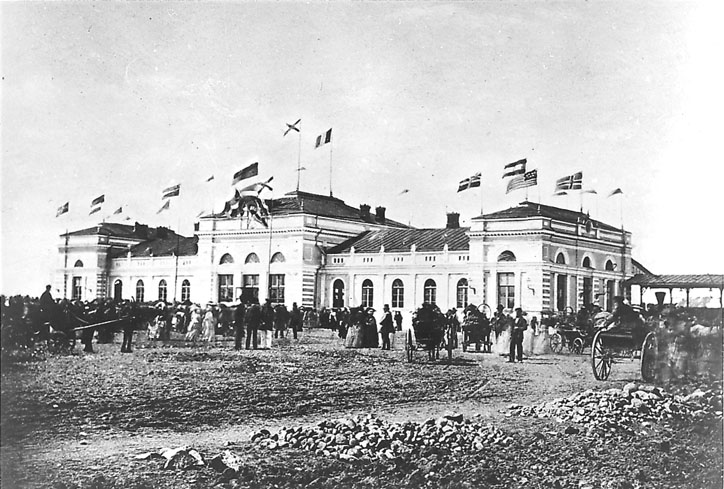
Opening ceremony of Turku railway station in 1876.

The Finnish economy experienced favourable growth between 1860 and 1890. Helsinki, the new capital, expanded rapidly during this time. Additionally, new industries emerged in Turku, as the traditional industries, such as the shipbuilding sector received a boost with the introduction of steamships. In 1862, the Turku Central Station was inaugurated. The presence of Russian soldiers enlivened street life. The start of railway traffic in 1876 and winter shipping to Stockholm in 1897 increased Turku's visitor numbers.

At the turn of the 20th century, Turku underwent rapid expansion as people migrated from surrounding rural areas to the city. Concurrently, suburbs surfaced in the surrounding urban region. The vast majority of those who relocated to Turku were Finnish-speaking, leading to a decrease in the proportion of Swedish-speaking inhabitants to 20%. Art deco-style wooden and stone high-rise buildings were constructed in the city centre. Noteworthy buildings in the area include the library, art museum, and St. Michael's Church. As the use of motor vehicles became more widespread, there was a considerable increase in traffic. In 1908, an electric tramway began operating in the city centre. Further additions to the area included water and sewage lines, electric lighting, telephones and the introduction of motion pictures.

== Wars and the Interwar period (1914–1944) ==
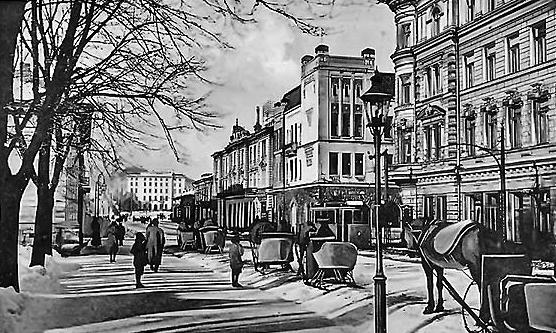
Aurakatu in Turku in the 1910s.

The outbreak of World War I in 1914 initially had no significant impact on the daily lives of Turku's inhabitants. However, as the conflict prolonged, the city plunged into a deepening and relentless food shortage and eventually encountered a severe famine. Nonetheless, Turku's industrial sector thrived due to an increased demand for various products in war-ravaged Russia.

Later on, in December 1917, Finland succeeded in achieving its independence but, at the same time, found itself embroiled in a civil war. Subsequently, Turku was ruled by the Reds, i.e. socialists, for a period of three months. One of Finland's largest prison camps was situated in the Sirkkala barracks at the end of the war. The scarcity of food and imported items persisted for an extended period beyond the war's conclusion. Diseases were prevalent amidst unsanitary and disorderly conditions. The Spanish influenza caused the demise of hundreds of Turku inhabitants during 1918–1919. The public health campaigns focused particularly on tuberculosis.

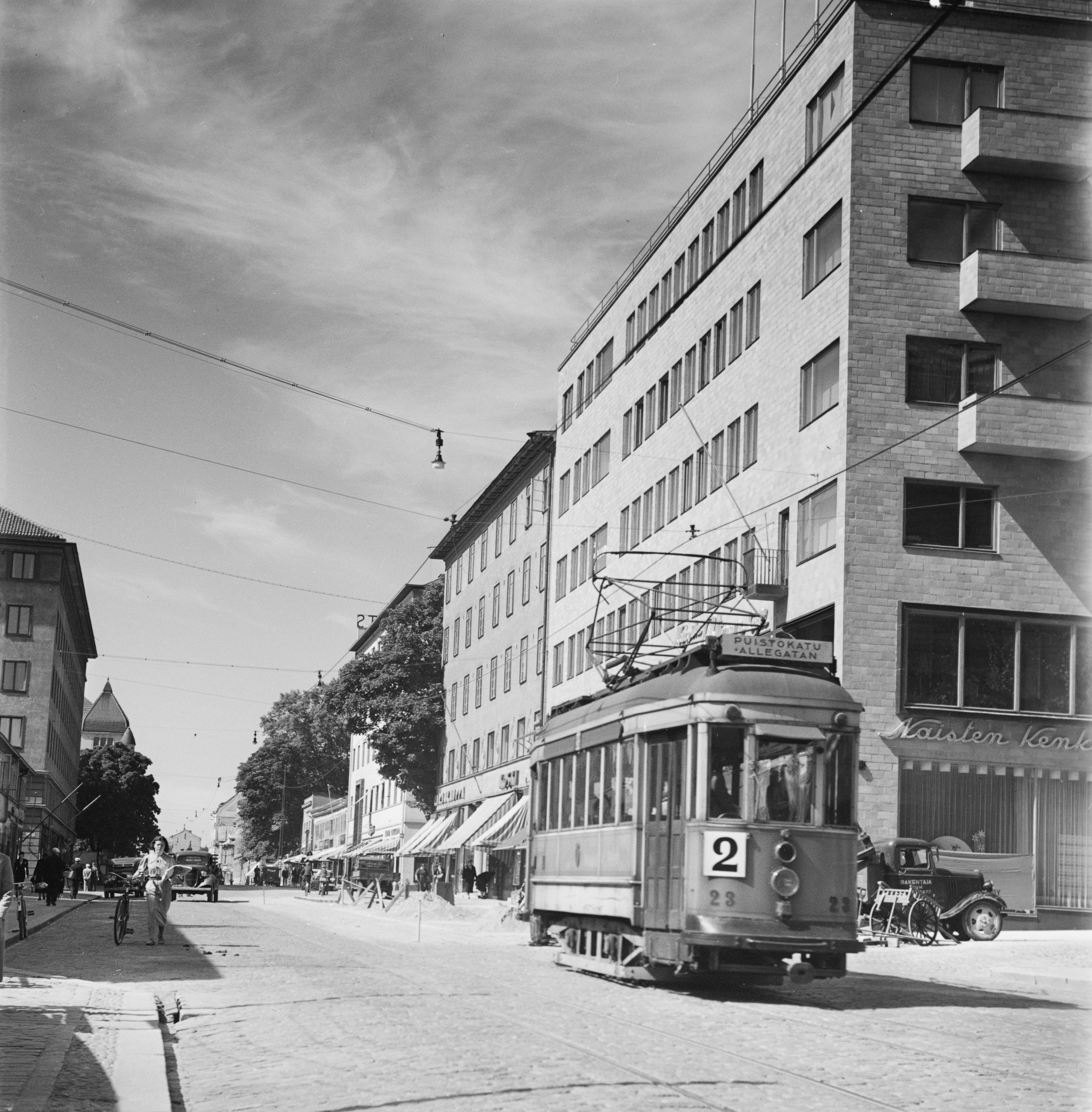
View of Yliopistonkatu street from Turku market square in 1938.

The 1920s saw a global economic expansion. Foreign brands were introduced into shops, the number of cars increased rapidly, and the press and advertising thrived. Although Finland had a prohibition law, illegal alcohol was still sold widely. The city saw the re-foundation of two universities: the Swedish-speaking Åbo Akademi in 1918 and the Finnish-speaking University of Turku in 1920. Additionally, numerous new apartment buildings were constructed. Turku emerged as a leader in functionalism in architecture.

The 1930s marked a worldwide Great Depression, causing several European nations to fall under extreme right-wing dominance. Meanwhile, Finland maintained its democratic regime. The challenging economic circumstances are also discernible in Turku, with construction work coming to a near standstill, among other factors. However, towards the end of the decade, industrial edifices, an airport, a bus station, and a new railway station were constructed.

During the World War II, Turku was heavily bombed by the Soviet Union due to its sea port. The city centre was mostly unscathed by the destruction, as the objectives were industrial plants and the port. The war resulted in a shortage of food in Finland, leading to rationing.

== Recent history (1945 to present) ==
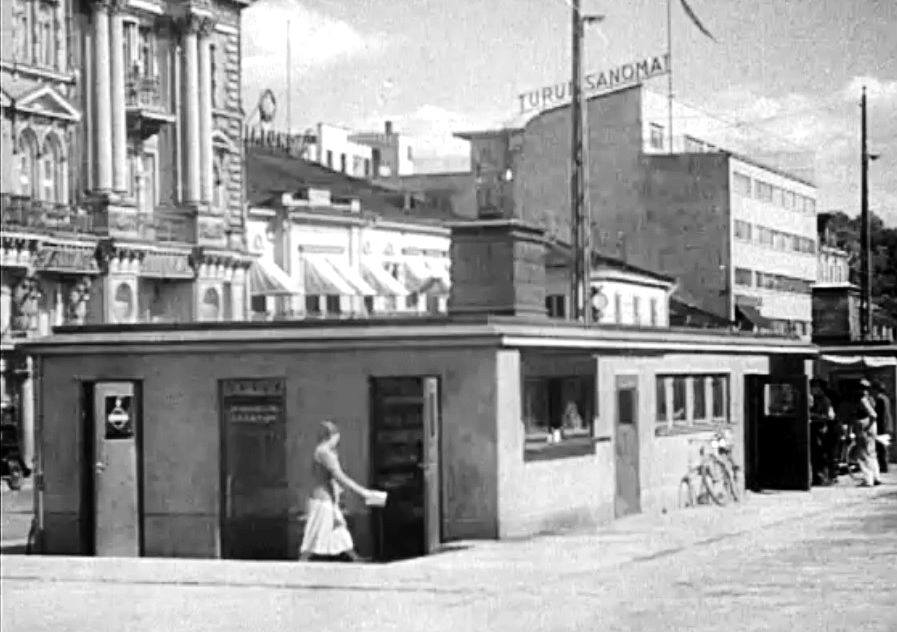
Lindblom's house and Pystykaffepaikka in 1948.

After the war came the years of reconstruction and population growth. Turku's shipbuilding industry was a major beneficiary. In 1930, 1939, 1944 and 1949, many surrounding suburbs were added to the city of Turku, extending its boundaries. Under the terms of the peace treaty with the Soviet Union, Finland was obliged to pay war reparations. In the 1940s, many workers moved to the city, living in cramped conditions, and at the same time the baby boomers were born.

The 1950s were a time of significant growth in Finland. Helsinki organized the Olympics in 1952, and Turku hosted some football matches at Kupittaa football stadium during the event. The opening of Turku Concert Hall in 1952 brought a considerable improvement in the city's music and theatre scene. In response to a severe housing shortage, old wooden houses were demolished and replaced with apartment buildings.

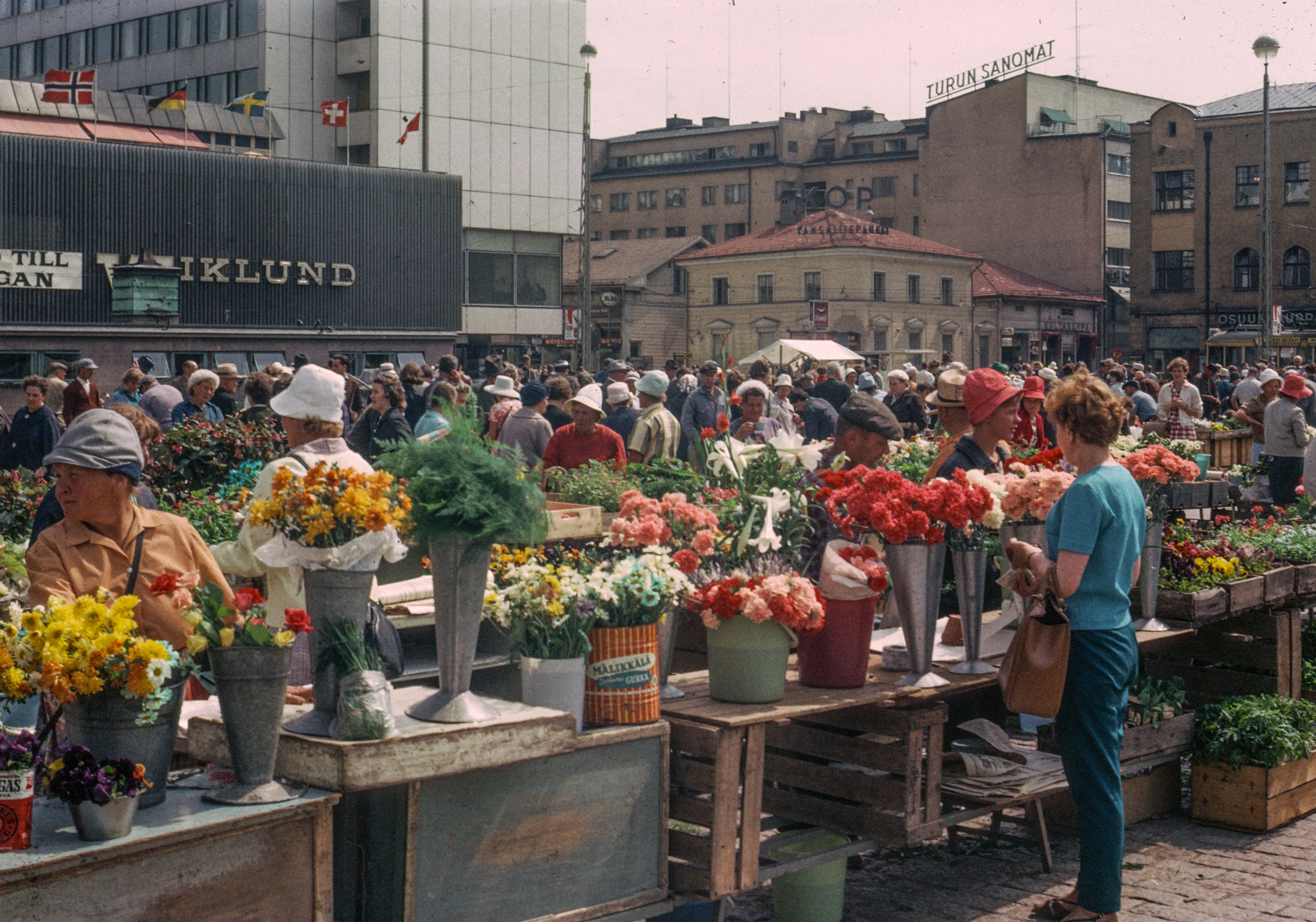
Market square in Turku in 1965.

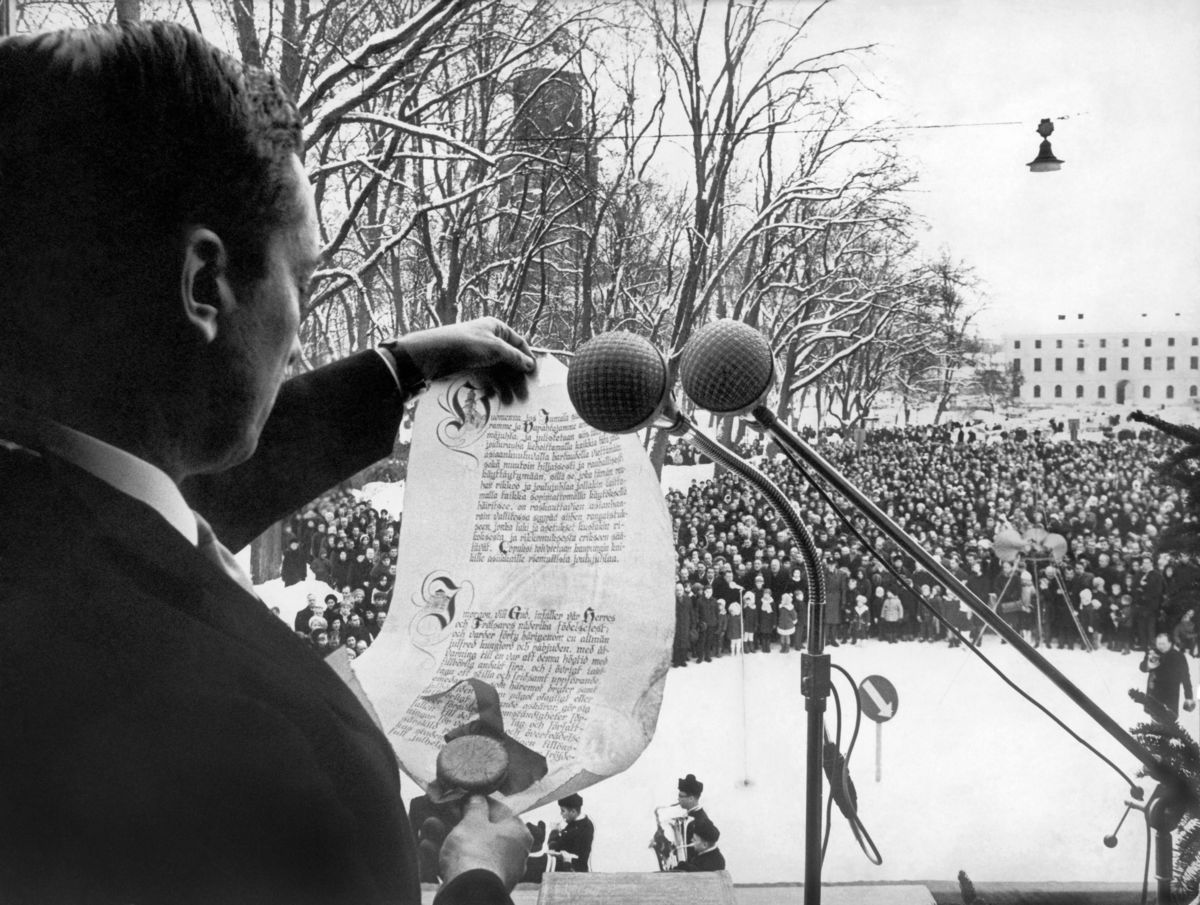
The declaration of Christmas Peace in 1965.

In the 1960s, Finnish students and art life predominantly conveyed radical leftism. Turku, as working-class city, saw left-wing parties driving the political scene. The establishment of Turku City Theatre in 1961 and Wäinö Aaltonen Museum of Art in 1967 were notable additions to the cultural landscape. In 1970, a rock concert held at the Ruissalo campsite gathered a significant number of attendees, leading to the subsequent annual organization of the Ruisrock festival during the summer. Concurrently, a sizeable growth in traffic and population resulted in prominent air and water pollution concerns.

During the 1960s and 1970s, Turku underwent a large-scale demolition of historical buildings that attracted criticism throughout Finland. This phenomenon, derisively referred to as the "disease of Turku", involved the removal of cultural heritage buildings to make way for new developments, often involving corruption.

The era was characterised by a strong belief in car ownership. As a result, Turku's last tram network was dismantled in 1972, despite opposition. However, the decision was soon regretted. Almost 60 years after the demolition, Turku is planning to build a new tram network in the 2030s. The demolition of the old art deco hotel building Hamburger Börs in 1976 was significant news throughout Finland. The left's reign ended in the municipal elections of the same year. Additional suburb areas were incorporated into the city of Turku in 1957, 1967, 1968, and 1973.

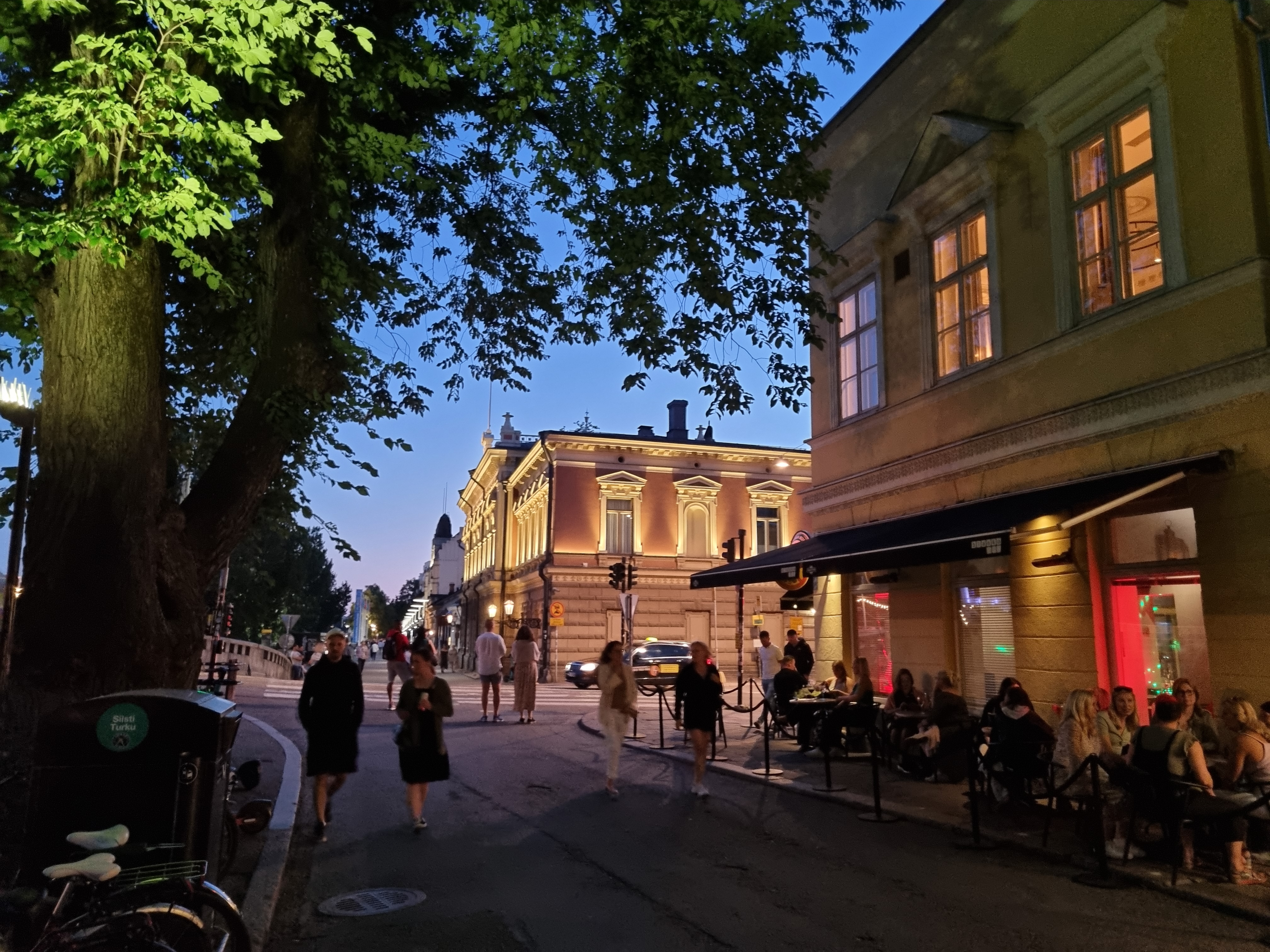
The historic centre of Turku on a summer night in 2022.

Today, the Turku region ranks third among Finland's metropolitan areas with about 320,000 inhabitants. The population of Turku has grown steadily throughout its history. In recent years, the majority of this growth has been due to immigration. The Turku region is the second-most ethnically diverse metropolitan area following the Helsinki metropolitan area.

== See also ==
- History of Finland
- History of Helsinki

== Sources ==
- Hiekkanen, Markus (2003). "Turun kaupungin perustaminen. Tulkintayrityksiä uusien arkeologisten tutkimusten perusteella". Archaeologiga Medii Aevi Finlandiae IX: Kaupunkia pintaa syvemmältä. Arkeologisia näkökulmia Turun historiaan (in Finnish). Turku: Suomen keskiajan arkeologian seura: 42–52. ISBN 951-9129-57-X.
- Laaksonen, Mikko (2018). Turku – Historialliset kaupunkikartat – Historical City Maps (in Finnish and English). Riga: AtlasArt. ISBN 978-952-5671-93-3.
- Lahtinen, Rauno (2015). Turun historia [History of Turku] (in Finnish) (2nd ed.). Turku: Turkuseura. ISBN 978-952-7025-04-8.
- Pihlman, Aki (2010). "Turun kaupungin muodostuminen ja kaupunkiasutuksen laajeneminen 1300-luvulla". Varhainen Turku. Raportteja 22 (in Finnish). Turku: Turun museokeskus: 9–29. ISBN 978-951-595-146-5.
