= Corruption in Finland =

Finland's overall corruption is relatively low, according to public opinion and global indexes and standards. The 2025 Corruption Perceptions Index released by Transparency International, which measures the perception of corruption in the public sector, scored Finland at 88 on a scale from 0 ("highly corrupt") to 100 ("very clean"). When ranked by score, Finland ranked second among the 182 countries in the Index, where the country or countries ranked first are perceived to have the most honest public sector. Finland has ranked first, second or third every year since the current version of the Index was introduced in 2012. For comparison with 2025 worldwide scores, the best score was 89 (ranked 1), the average score was 42, and the worst score was 9 (ranked 181, in a two-way tie). For comparison with regional scores, the best score among Western European and European Union countries (Note: Austria, Belgium, Bulgaria, Croatia, Cyprus, Czechia, Denmark, Estonia, Finland, France, Germany, Greece, Hungary, Iceland, Ireland, Italy, Latvia, Lithuania, Luxembourg, Malta, Netherlands, Norway, Poland, Portugal, Romania, Slovakia, Slovenia, Spain, Sweden, Switzerland, and the United Kingdom.) was 89, the average score was 64 and the worst score was 40.

According to a 2013 Transparency International survey, an overwhelming majority of people in Finland do not witness cases of corruption by public officials or institutions in their lifetime. Existing corruption tends to be structural, arising from a network of wealthy individuals who favor each other in business; private companies have no disclosure requirements. The few instances of corruption involving the government include decision-making in state investments, political donations, and election funding. Non-traditional types of corruption in Finland (common globally) include tax evasion, gifts, hospitality, and conflicts of interest.

== Agreements ==
Finland signed in 2002 the European Council GRECO criminal law against bribery. Finland demanded two exceptions in bribery law that have been signed e.g. in neighbour lands Estonia and Sweden. In May 2019 exceptions were still not taken into force in Finnish criminal law against bribery.

== Forms ==
=== Elections ===
A 2008 Transparency International report noted a remarkable lack of transparency in Finnish political finance, reinforcing demands for greater transparency; in 2007, the Groupe d'États Contre la Corruption (GRECO) stressed that corruption should be better noticed in election financing. The 2007 Finnish campaign finance scandal erupted the following spring, with nine government ministers and several members of parliament lacking transparency in their election-funding reports. Since the law had no penalties for false fund reporting by elected politicians, the conservative National Coalition Party and rural Centre Party have not demanded the resignations of the convicted politicians. According to the 2009 Act on Candidate Election Funding, presidential candidates, parliamentarians, and deputies must declare all funding for an election campaign; donors of over €1,500 must be named.

=== Public-sector jobs ===
Two-thirds of state and municipal public servants are appointed from political parties, of which only five percent of Finnish citizens are members. Article 6 of the constitution of Finland states that everyone has an equal right to public jobs, and selection should be based on capability and expertise. The number of political appointments of public servants has been criticized as excessive, and the parties determine public-sector salaries.

=== Tax avoidance ===
Prime Minister Jyrki Katainen claimed to fight unreported employment or undeclared employment income but, according to Markku Hirvonen, resources and initiatives in Finland have been insufficient to reach this goal. Two hundred tax officers examined tax havens in Sweden in 2013; 100 officers worked in Denmark, 80 in Norway, and 10–20 in Finland. Although investigations of unreported employment income found Sweden €100 million in previously unpaid taxes, Finland found none. In Sweden, unlike Finland, all international transactions above 150,000 Swedish kronor (about €15,000) are required to be reported to tax officers.

According to Taloussanomat, Finland loses €320 million in annual taxes to tax havens. The business watchdog organization Finnwatch reported that Finnish companies, including the nation's top 20 companies, have 438 subsidiaries in countries classified as tax havens.

Germany bought LGT Bank data from Heinrich Kieber in 2008. According to the data, about 20 Finns evaded taxes amounting to €50-60 million; this was the country's largest known tax avoidance case. All names have been kept secret, and authorities have been criticized for not doing enough to prosecute tax evaders.

Foreign accounts are legal if taxes are paid. Based on this data, the unpaid taxes on the accounts amounted to more than €10 million in 2013. According to a 21 September 2013 Helsingin Sanomat article, Liechtenstein banks held funds from Casimir Ehrnrooth (UPM). Ehrnrooth's family owns majority shares in companies such as YIT, Jaakko Pöyry, Guggenheim Helsinki Plan and Bertel Paulig, and owns a construction company in Turku. Jorma Ollila and Kari Stadigh also have investments in Luxembourg.

In Finland, total collected annual taxes are €65 billion and the annual fiscal deficit is estimated at €4.6 to €7.7 billion. Unlike Sweden, the country has not fully determined how the tax gap should be assessed. According to Parliamentary Audit Committee chairperson Tuija Brax, "Sweden has been actively addressing this tax gap problem for some time".

Finnish tax authorities began investigating holdings in Liechtenstein in 2008, and 17 Finns paid additional taxes totaling €10 million. Taxpayers made reclamation in Administrative Court. The amount of unpaid taxes is estimated to be high, and decisions of this court are not made public. In two cases shown to reporters, the Administrative Court imposed a payment of about one percent (which conflicts with Tax Administration rules). The court's justification for a very low tax is unknown. In one case, funds sheltered from taxation amounted to €483,000 and the additional tax was €4,350. This extra taxation is paid as interest on the original amount. According to the Supreme Administrative Court of Finland, no other legal procedures are possible when collecting the hidden tax and its one-percent interest rate. Tax officers are untrained in legal issues.

==== Money laundering ====
The Helsinki District Court dropped charges in October 2019 in a suspected €135 million money laundering case through Finnish construction company bank accounts.

=== Construction ===
Finnish police investigated the financial irregularities of the Youth Foundation. In 2018, foundation chair Perttu Nousiainen received hundreds of thousands of euros from tax-haven firms into his personal accounts. Police suspect the building firm's managers of aggravated tax fraud and other offenses. The trust connected to the Youth Foundation funded Centre Party politicians, in conflict with the law.

An audit was conducted in 2012 of a Helsinki construction office, based on corruption concerns. The business works with YIT. Six people were arrested in May 2012 by an order from Helsinki District Court, investigating corruption in Helsinki building contracts. The detainees were suspected of accepting bribes. The public HKR-Rakennuttaja purchased services from the construction sector with a value of up to about €100 million per year. Fines may reach about €100,000 over several years. Destia, a state-owned company that builds public roads, was investigated for alleged irregularities in January 2013.

Former Espoo mayor Marketta Kokkonen and Olavi Louko, director of Espoo's Technical and Environment Services since 2001, were charged with bribery linked to major construction companies in 2010. Bribes were said to be paid from 2004 to 2008. The state ordered Louko to pay a fine of €7,500 . On the Espoo board of directors, some Finns voted no confidence in Louko

In a Parliamentary Ombudsman investigation released in May 2013, Maija Saxlin said that museum director Janne Gallen-Kallela-Sirén was biased in his position on the Guggenheim Helsinki Plan. According to Carl Gustaf Ehrnrooth, a major owner of construction companies (including YIT and Pöyry), Gallen-Kallela-Sirén made the proposal for the Guggenheim museum; he was a board member of a company majority-owned by C–G Ehrnrooth, and his wife also worked for the company. When tax havens were criticised and Casimir Ehrnrooth's accounts made public, Helsinki politicians accepted a tax-haven-funded project. The 2007 Finnish campaign finance scandal bribery sentences were overturned in the Helsinki Court of Appeals in late June 2013.

In 2013, former Vantaa mayor Jukka Peltomäki was accused of receiving €500,000 from Forma Futura from 2006 to 2011. Forma Futura had planned buildings for VVO, NCC, YIT and Citycon.

==== Olkiluoto nuclear plant ====
The Olkiluoto nuclear plant construction project has been accused of grey work; it was impossible to check foreign workers' employment documentation without prior notice. Controllers and police had no unannounced access to the area. After notice, employment circumstances were often changed; foreign workers often left the country before a criminal case was evaluated. The workforce was fluid, and employees were not registered for tax or other official registers.

=== Youth Foundation ===
There are several criminal investigations going on regarding transactions done by Youth Foundation, or Nuorisosäätiö in Finnish, since 2014 ongoing in 2018. Youth Foundation rents apartments for young adults in Finland. Youth Foundation have had close links to Centre Party. For example, its ex-directors include ex-Prime Minister Matti Vanhanen and MP Antti Kaikkonen. Foundation have received tens of millions of public funds for construction. In 2018 police investigated construction business in Estonia and €18,5 million financing from Poland. Millions of euros seem to be lost in consulting agreements and in overpayments of land and constructions. Police investigate financial transactions, black market accounting, potential money laundering and potential relations to tax havens. Business in Estonia was made with a Finnish businessman, who is a member of the board in at least three apartments in the USA owned by MP Eero Lehti, conservative National Coalition Party in Finland.

The construction company in Hämeenlinna was in bankruptcy in September 2019. Main owner was accused of bribes in relation to the Youth Foundation (Nuorisosäätiö) case.

Youth Foundation lost 8 million in real estate deals and the first juridical claim was published in January 2020. Investigation is ongoing about e.g. fraud and bribe.

=== Electronics ===
The 1977 Salora case was Finland's largest tax evasion and bribery case to date. TV Nurmi and Salora sold televisions valued at six million Finnish markkas (excluding accounting procedures) from 1970 to 1975. A Valco factory, built in Imatra at a cost of Fmk265 million in 1978, was bankrupt in two years. Politicians were accused of bribery, since they received TV and stereo equipment from Salora. Although no leading politicians were accused in court, Social Democrats, RKP, Liberals and Centre Party candidates lost in the next election because of suspected bribery. Bror Wahlroos, father of Björn Wahlroos, was accused of receiving stereos valued at Fmk2,000 and received a Fmk3,000 fine. Selora's director was convicted of bribing five ministers, two secretaries-general, one governor and 30 tax officers, and sentenced to 3 1/2 years' imprisonment.

=== Politics ===
Tax Administration director Mikko Laaksonen found company election funds for the National Coalition Party which were incorrectly reduced as the expense of company operations during the 1980s. In 1979, the largest newspaper advertisement expenses in Helsinki were by members of the Construction Committee.

Mikko Sauli told Helsingin Sanomat on 11 May 2012 that political youth organizations overestimate membership to receive more state support. The large parties refused to give their member lists to authorities. State support was largest in 2012 for the centre (€670,000) and National Coalition Parties (€657,000). Ilkka Kanerva of the National Coalition Party was convicted in April 2012 for receiving bribes, and resigned from the Turku council the following month.

==== Government ====
In November 2016, Juha Sipilä's government allocated €100 million in public funds for Terrafame (known as the Talvivaara Mining Company). YLE TV News reported that a company owned by Sipilä's children and other relatives had a half-million-euro contract with Terrafame. According to Sipilä, Pöyry drew up the contract as a consultant. Pöyry's major owners are Henrik Ehrnrooth and his family. YLE reported that Georg and Henrik Ehrnrooth own a company in Luxemburg that organizes tax-haven companies for clients, including Jorma Ollila and Kari Stadigh. The company worked with Mossack Fonseca in Panama for several years.

=== Sports ===
In 2011, 11 football players were charged with bribery. Singaporean match-fixer Wilson Raj Perumal was accused of fixing matches from 2008 to 2011.

== Anti-corruption conventions ==
Agreements include:

- Council of Europe Civil Law Convention on Corruption (signed June 2000; ratified October 2001)
- Council of Europe Criminal Law Convention on Corruption (signed January 1999; ratified October 2002)
- OECD Convention on Combating Bribery of Foreign Public Officials (signed December 1998; ratified February 1999)
- United Nations Convention against Corruption (signed December 2003; accepted June 2006)
- UN Convention against Transnational Organized Crime (signed December 2000; ratified February 2004)

== Transparency International ==
Transparency international's Corruption Perceptions Index scores countries on a scale from 0 ("highly corrupt") to 100 ("very clean") according to the perceptions of experts and business people of the corruption in the countries' public sectors. Finland's score has changed little since the current version of the Index was introduced in 2012:

- 2012 - 90 points
- 2013 - 89 points
- 2014 - 89 points
- 2015 - 90 points
- 2016 - 89 points
- 2017 - 85 points
- 2018 - 85 points
- 2019 - 86 points
- 2020 - 85 points
- 2021 - 88 points
- 2022 - 87 points
- 2023 - 87 points
- 2024 - 88 points
- 2025 - 88 points

== See also ==
- Crime in Finland
- Disease of Turku
- Police corruption in Finland
