= Disease of Turku =

Corruption-related demolition of old houses of Turku in 1960–1970s

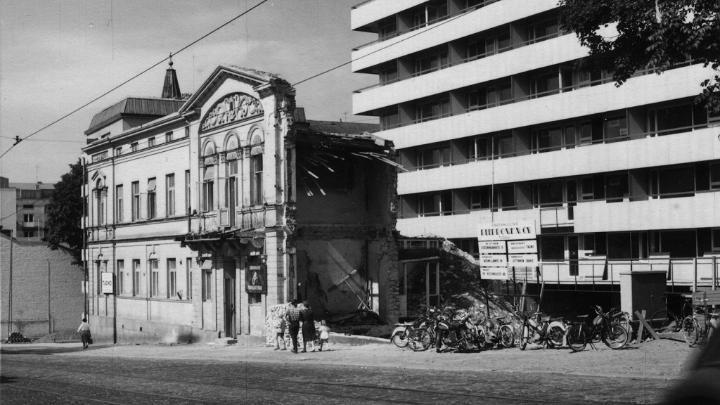
The Nobel House is demolished in front of an apartment building to widen the Uudenmaankatu street in 1961.

The disease of Turku (Finnish: Turun tauti; Swedish: Åbosmittan) was the demolition of old buildings of cultural and historical significance in Turku, Finland, in the 1960s and 1970s to make way for new buildings, and the corruption associated with it. Although the name mentions Turku, similar urban development took place in several other Finnish cities. The term only began to be used after the worst wave of demolitions in the 1980s, when Turku's municipal policy was criticized in the Finnish press.

== Background ==
Turku faced a severe housing shortage following the Second World War. According to population projections, the city's population would have risen to over 200,000 in a few decades. To cope with the increase, land use had to be made more efficient and the old wooden building stock had to be demolished to make way for new apartment buildings and commercial buildings. It was more profitable for developers to demolish old buildings rather than repair them, and the new apartments sold very well. The first valuable buildings to be demolished in the center of Turku were the Lindblom House and Hotel Phoenix.

The reconstruction or renovation of the grid plan area of Turku was most extensive from the late 1950s to the early 1960s. New buildings were built without any regulation from a cityscape perspective, and the town planning was done one plot or block at a time using "postage stamp plans" for the needs of each building site. These plans generally included widening the roads for increasing car traffic and the demolition of old valuable buildings. Developers were granted the right to add more floors than the 1950 building regulations allowed, in exchange for leaving space to widen the street.

In 1959, the city council of Turku left the proposal for a change to the local plan for the grid plan area unprocessed, but decided instead to apply for a building ban from the Finnish Government. During the building ban, local plans could be drawn up with special permits, which allowed the council to force builders to widen streets. The ban was originally in effect for two years, but it was repeatedly renewed until the mid-1970s. The council rarely heard any speeches in defense of historically valuable buildings. The preparation of the functional zoning was slowed down by the incompleteness of various studies and population and traffic calculations, but Turku's development was considered a high priority, so plan changes were granted almost automatically. Ten plan changes were sometimes discussed at a single council meeting.

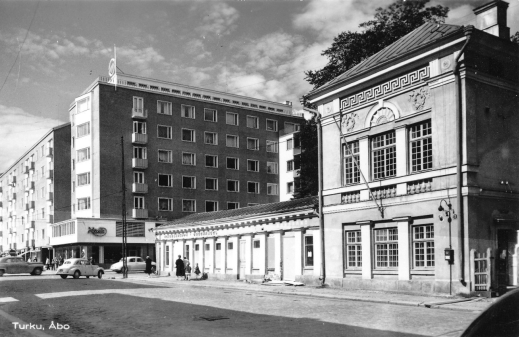
The houses on the Julin's block were granted a demolition permit when Stockmann threatened to withdraw from the Turku department store project. The houses were demolished in 1966, except for one end section, but the plot remained empty for over 20 years. According to Rauno Lahtinen, the case is one of the symbols of Turku's disease.

In the early 1960s, almost 70 percent of the city's housing construction was concentrated in the city center, until rebuilding almost stopped in 1964. There were many reasons. The tax relief laws for housing production changed (15 percent of the floor area was now allowed to be used for purposes other than housing, instead of the previous 30 percent), and the Turku City Council restricted building rights in the city center in 1962. On the other hand, the number of vacant plots in the city center had decreased, and prefabricated construction technology made it possible to build in the area at a low cost. Two-thirds of the plots in the core business district had already been renovated by 1963, and the focus of construction began to shift to the suburbs.

The last major building to be demolished was the Hamburger Börs in 1976, when the first protest against the demolition was also held. In the autumn 1976 municipal elections, the left lost its majority, which also resulted in a decrease in the popularity of Gründer construction. However, the construction continued to cause controversy. The next scandal arose from the apartment buildings planned for the Talousseura plot along the Hämeenkatu street, which opponents believed threatened to obscure the views from Vartiovuorenmäki. The incident activated the Turku environmental movement, and in connection with the handling of the construction controversy, the press began to use the term "the disease of Turku".

== History of the term ==
Most often, the "Turku disease" refers to the large-scale illegal influence of a few large concentrations on municipal policy and public decisions regarding specific land use, which leads to the city's old architecture, especially its cultural and historical value, disappearing from the streetscape.

— Eugen Parkatti, Chairman of the Majority Association,

At the beginning of 1981, the Finnish press was buzzing about apartment buildings being built on the Vartiovuorenmäki plot of the Talousseura in Turku. On Saturday, January 10, 1981, a front-page story was published in Uusi Suomi, titled "Quarrels, intrigues, defections, trading, pseudo-democracy and dirty gossip: TURKU DISEASE". In the article, Ilkka Juva referred to the politics of Turku in the early 1980s with the term "Turku disease" and not to the earlier demolition scandals. In his article, he drew attention to Turku's "own super board", i.e. the real estate and building board, which was responsible for both zoning and construction and a third of the city's budget funds.

A week later, the term was used in a news article in Helsingin Sanomat, which referred to builders, businessmen and Finnish Freemasons in addition to Turun Sanomat. According to the story, Turku was led by a group of Freemasons, which included the city's key businessmen, authorities, architects and many construction company managers. According to non-fiction writer and historian Rauno Lahtinen, the only truth is that planning was "strongly in the hands of Freemasons": the city planning architect Olavi Laisaari and his successors Pekka Sivula and Risto Tilus were all Freemasons. The press began to see Freemasons in the leadership of other Finnish cities as well. In addition to Helsingin Sanomat, the Turku disease was widely covered in publications such as Seura and Apu. According to Lahtinen, the term became established at the latest when law professor Hannu Tapani Klami wrote a pamphlet on the subject, "The Turku Disease". In it, he discussed the shortcomings of the planning and construction laws. According to Klami, the concept of the same name first appeared in the local press as "Åbosmittan" in 1917, when it referred to a similar corruption.

In the Suomen Turku newspaper in the spring of 1982, SDP member Jukka Mikkola said that the concept described the situation in Turku well. In his opinion, its "most essential manifestations are – the political defections that occurred after the 1980 municipal elections, the many tax fraud lawsuits and the channels of influence of construction companies". In the Yhdyskuntasuunnittelu magazine, Osmo Kivivuori, head of the environmental protection department of the Turku and Pori County Administrative Board, wrote that the culmination of Turku's disease was the defection of Kirsti Smolander and Eva-Liisa Välke to the National Coalition Party, which resulted in a narrow right-wing majority in the council. In the autumn of 1982, the city council decided that the town planning architect Pekka Sivula, who had been involved in the Puolimatka bribery scandal, would be allowed to continue in his post. His successor, Risto Tilus, had also been convicted of accepting bribes.

== Present day ==
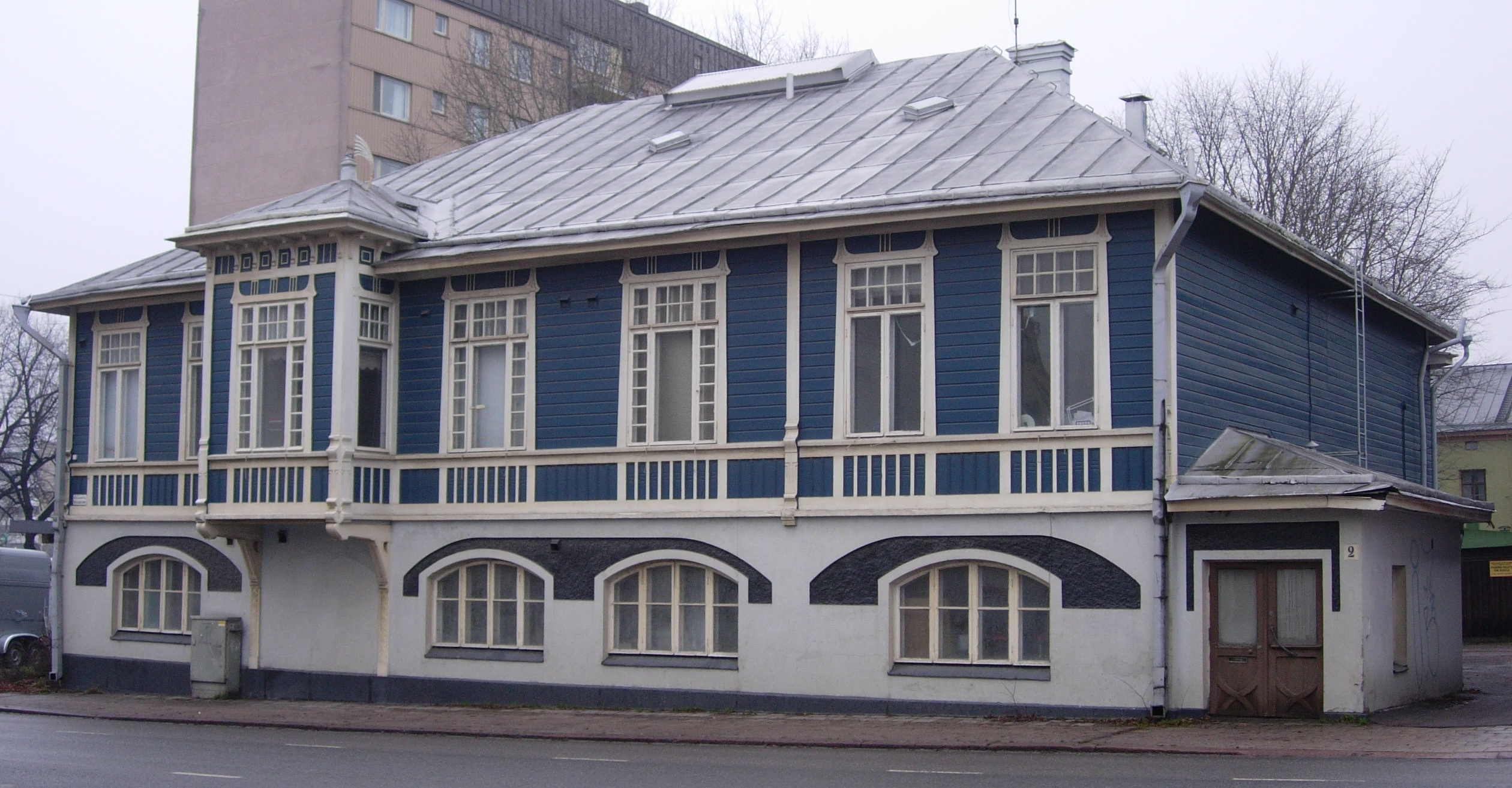
The Blue House (Sininen talo) was granted a demolition permit by the building board in 2009. During the processing of the local plan proposal in the city council, supporters of the demolition were accused of being a Turku disease.

Accusations of Turku disease have been raised in the 2000s, especially in the Turku City Council in connection with proposals for changes to the city plan. For example, in 2015, when the council granted building rights to Sepänkatu 5 and Harjattula, Turku disease was raised again, although at the same time it was decided to save three old buildings. Turku disease was also raised in connection with the decision to demolish the Blue House.

The Sokos Hotel Hamburger Börs, located on the edge of the market square and opened in 1979, was demolished in 2019. According to Janne Helin, CEO of Schauman Architects, the new hotel building is a "counterattack" against "Turku's disease, where the old is torn down and an 'ugly box building' is designed in its place."

== Analysis ==
According to Rauno Lahtinen, the Turku disease "corroded into an essential part of Turku's public image for decades." He says that many people think that the events in Turku were "not significantly different from the development of other Finnish cities." The media of Helsinki desire to divert attention from the Helsinki Metro bribery scandal has also been cited as a reason. According to Lahtinen, the concept has become established, although people can mean different things by it: some refer to it simply as demolition of buildings, others as political wrangling.

According to Raimo Vahtera, the concept is not only related to zoning and demolition of buildings. According to him, it is a "multi-purpose weapon when the target is Turku", and "if someone's affairs in Turku are not going well for one reason or another, the reason can easily be found in the Turku disease." Architect Osmo Kivivuori wrote in 2012 that it is a question of emphasis what is considered the "most essential symptom" of the Turku disease, but according to him, all of them are connected by corruption.

According to Turku Deputy Mayor Juhani Määttä, the Turku disease ended in 1993, when there were so many plans that there was no longer any need to "pay anyone" for construction. At the beginning of the same year, the composition of the Real Estate and Building Board also changed, and "some officials" retired. Minister of Culture and Sports Stefan Wallin, for his part, has said that the Turku disease ended in 2001, when the linking of the market square park and the new library fell through in the Land Use and Building Act.

According to Jouko Aaltonen, director of the 2011 documentary film Battle for the City, which deals with the subject, the Turku disease "is unfortunately a disease of the whole of Finland", as similar chains of events have been seen elsewhere, for example in Tampere and Oulu.

== See also ==
- Corruption in Finland
- History of Turku
- Termination of the Turku tramway

== General and cited references ==
- Klami, Hannu Tapani (1982). Turun tauti. Kansanvallan kriisi suomalaisessa ympäristöpolitiikassa (in Finnish). Helsinki: WSOY. ISBN 951-0-11365-4.
- Lahtinen, Rauno (2013). Turun puretut talot (in Finnish). Turku: Sammakko. ISBN 978-952-483-266-3.
