= Hamburger Börs =

Hamburger Börs may refer to:

- Hamburger Börs, Stockholm, a venue in Sweden
- Hamburger Börs, Turku, a hotel in Finland

== See also ==
- Hamburger Börse, the Hamburg Stock Exchange
