= Battle for the City =

2011 film

- Directed by: Jouko Aaltonen
- Written by: Jouko Aaltonen; Rauno Lahtinen; Olli Vesala
- Produced by: Jouko Aaltonen
- Cinematography: Pekka Aine
- Release date: 29 April 2011
- Running time: 76 minutes
- Country: Finland
- Language: Finnish

Battle for the City (Finnish: Taistelu Turusta) is a 2011 Finnish documentary film directed by Jouko Aaltonen about the city of Turku, including the controversial "disease of Turku".
