= AFRY =

Swedish design and consulting company

- Type: Publicly traded Aktiebolag
- Traded as: AFRY
- Industry: Engineering Consultancy
- Predecessor: Pöyry; ÅF
- Founded: 1895; 131 years ago Malmö, Sweden
- Headquarters: Solna, Sweden
- Area served: Worldwide
- Key people: Linda Pålsson (CEO); Tom Erixon (Chairman)
- Number of employees: 18,000 (2025)
- Website: www.afry.com

AFRY AB (publ) is a Swedish-Finnish supplier of engineering, design, and advisory services, with a global reach. The company originates from Sweden and it was formed in 1895 under the name of "The Southern Swedish Steam Generator Association" (in Swedish: Södra Sveriges Ångpanneförening). AFRY has been listed on Nasdaq Stockholm.

== History ==
Södra Sveriges Ångpanneförening ("The Southern Swedish Steam Generator Association") was founded in Malmö on 23 February 1895. It was the first Swedish steam-pipe association to take care of the interests of the owners of steam generators and other pressure vessels. The main task was to perform regular inspections on the safety of steam boilers to help prevent industrial accidents. "The Central and Northern Swedish Steam Generator Association" was formed in Stockholm in 1897, and the inspectors began to conduct consultancy services. In 1910, both associations expanded their business to include Electrical engineering. The two associations merged in 1964 under the name Ångpanneföreningen (ÅF), covering the whole of Sweden as a market.

On 5 May 2008, the Ångpanneföreningen changed its name to ÅF. In 2010, the operations of ÅF-Kontroll were sold to DEKRA. In 2019, ÅF acquires the Finnish company Pöyry PLC and are combined into one company and brand – AFRY.

== Divisions ==
AFRY is divided into three divisions:

1. Energy
2. Industry
3. Transportation & Places

AFRY has around 18,000 experts in infrastructure, industry and energy worldwide in 40 countries.

== CEOs ==
- 12 January 2025 – present: Linda Pålsson
- 1 April 2017 – 11 January 2025: Jonas Gustavsson.
- 2002 – 30 March 2017: Jonas Wiström.
