= Pöyry =

Finnish consulting and engineering company

Pöyry PLC
- Native name: Pöyry Oyj
- Company type: Julkinen osakeyhtiö
- Traded as: Nasdaq Helsinki: POY1V
- Industry: Engineering
- Founded: 1958
- Founder: Jaakko Pöyry
- Defunct: 2019
- Successor: AFRY
- Headquarters: Helsinki, Finland
- Number of locations: Offices in 45 countries
- Products: Engineering and project management, management consulting
- Services: Management Consulting; Engineering Services;
- Net income: EUR 4 million (2015)
- Number of employees: 4,881 (2019)
- Website: www.poyry.com

Pöyry PLC (Finnish: Pöyry Oyj), which merged in 2019 with Swedish company ÅF into AFRY, was an international consulting and engineering firm that served clients globally across the energy and industrial sectors and provided local engineering services in its core markets. Its focus sectors were power generation, transmission, and distribution; forest industries; chemicals and biorefining; mining and metals; transportation and water. It changed its name from Jaakko Pöyry Group in 2006. The company was listed on the Helsinki Stock Exchange and was headquartered in Vantaa, Finland.

The company was founded by Jaakko Pöyry, who spearheaded its growth from a small engineering office in Finland to a global corporation in his special field of interest, the forest products industry.

Pöyry delivered around 10,000 projects annually including engineering consulting services for major projects such as:

- The world's longest traffic tunnel, the Gotthard Base Tunnel in Switzerland
- The world's largest combined power and desalination plant, Ras al-Khair in Saudi Arabia
- The first hydropower dam on the lower Mekong river, the Xayaburi Dam in Laos
- The largest and most energy efficient waste-to-energy plant in Finland, Vantaa Energy, Finland
- One of the world's most advanced sewage systems, Emscher, Germany
- The world's largest single-line pulp mill, Eldorado, Brazil
- One of the world's largest offshore wind farms, Lillgrund Wind Farm, Sweden

== Organisation ==
Pöyry operated with four business groups: Energy, Industry, Regional Operations, and Management Consulting. The Pöyry Group had offices in over 45 countries and operated in over 100 countries employing about 6,000 experts.

== Financial information ==
Pöyry's net sales in 2015 were €575 million. The company's shares were quoted on Nasdaq Helsinki (Pöyry PLC: POY1V).

== Controversies ==
In 2011, Pöyry was commissioned by the Government of Laos (GoL) to review whether GoL had complied with the guidelines of the Mekong River Commission in their commencement of the controversial Xayaburi Dam Project (the first major hydropower dam on the mainstream of the lower Mekong). Pöyry's conclusion was that “Xayaburi HPP has principally been designed in accordance with the applicable MRC Design Guidelines”. However, they later go on to state "With additional investigations…it should be possible to fully meet the MRC Design Guidelines requirements relating to the Xayaburi HPP." Despite this contention, they concluded "the decision whether or not to proceed with the project rests solely with the Government of Laos".

On 11 June 2012, a number of NGOs filed a complaint to the Ministry of Employment and the Economy in Finland, concerning Pöyry PLC and Swiss subsidiary Pöyry Energy AG, relating to the Xayaburi hydropower plant project. On 18 June 2013, the ministry released a statement that Pöyry complied with OECD guidelines for corporate social responsibility. The ministry stated that Pöyry's actions served to mitigate the environmental impacts of the project. Pöyry acted as a technical consultant to the Lao government, however did not participate in the assessment of the environmental and social impact or in the decision-making process.

On 1 October 2015, Pöyry Finland, a subsidiary of Pöyry PLC, was handed a sanction of debarment by the World Bank for four distinct cases of "fraudulent practices". Under the sanction Pöyry Finland and its subsidiaries were barred from participating in World Bank-funded projects for a period of one year starting 30 September 2015.

According to a Pöyry press release, "Neither Pöyry PLC nor any other subsidiary companies of Pöyry PLC are affected by this sanction, and remain eligible to participate in World Bank Group financed projects. The decision relates to a water sector project in Vietnam in 2008, where Pöyry Finland Oy (as successor to Pöyry Environment Oy) was found to have not complied with the Bank's administrative rules. No unlawful conduct by Pöyry Finland Oy or its employees has been identified in this connection."

== Company ranking ==
The Engineering News-Record's yearly rank of the largest contractors and design firms internationally, in 2015, ranked Pöyry the 35th largest international design firm from projects executed outside its home country.

CEO and President from 1 January 2016 is Martin à Porta.
