= Jaakko Pöyry =

Jaakko Veikko Emanuel Pöyry (August 6, 1924 in Sodankylä – September 8, 2006 in Helsinki) was a Finnish industrialist.

He founded Pöyry (OMX: POY1V) and personally oversaw its growth from a small engineering office to a global consulting and engineering firm focusing on the energy, forest industry and infrastructure and environment sectors. It changed its name from Jaakko Pöyry Group in 2006. The company is headquartered in Vantaa, Finland.

== Sources ==
- Seppälä, Raimo (2004). Korvessa karjui se karvainen karhu : Jaakko Pöyryn pitkä tie Sodankylästä kuuteen maanosaan [In the wilderness roared that hairy bear: Jaakko Pöyry's long way from Sodankylä to six continents] (in Finnish). Helsingissä: Otava. ISBN 978-951-1-19328-9. OCLC 61530003.
