= Trams in Turku =

Trams in Turku may refer to:

- Trams in Turku (1890–1892), a horse-drawn tram system
- Trams in Turku (1908–1972), an electric tram system
- Turku tramway, a planned electric tram system
