= Functional zoning =

Land classification method

Functional zoning, functional city zoning, or use-based zoning is a method used for dividing land use by its function. Typically, land use is divided in two ways, by its function and by its physical characteristics. An example of functional zoning would be an area that has designated zones based on a function such as an industrial zone, a recreational zone and a residential zone. An example of an area zoned by its physical characteristics is defined in terms of characteristics like development density, minimum lot size, and building coverage, placement and height.

Functional zoning tends to create or increase car dependency, while mixed-use zoning tends to enable walking, making it more sustainable. It has been criticized for causing the squandering of land, energy, and time.

== Single-use zoning ==
Separation between uses is a feature of many planned cities designed before the advent of zoning. A notable example is Adelaide in South Australia, whose city centre, along with the suburb of North Adelaide, is surrounded on all sides by a park, the Adelaide Park Lands. The park was designed by Colonel William Light in 1836 in order to physically separate the city centre from its suburbs. Low density residential areas surround the park.

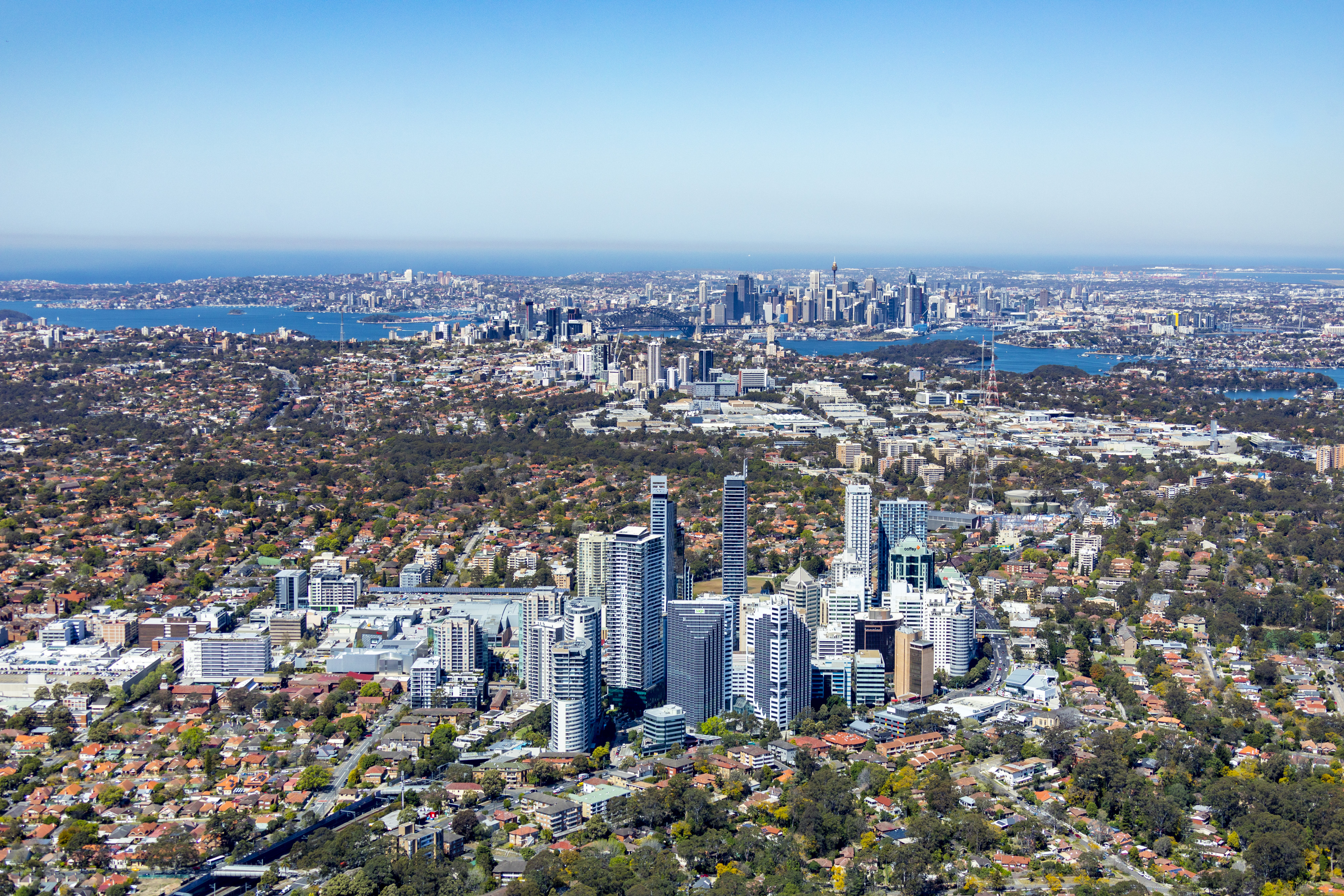
Aerial view of Chatswood, Australia, looking toward Sydney. The boundaries between low density residential, commercial and industrial zones are clearly visible.

Sir Ebenezer Howard, founder of the garden city movement, cited Adelaide as an example of how green open space could be used to prevent cities from expanding beyond their boundaries and coalescing. His design for an ideal city, published in his 1902 book Garden Cities of To-morrow, envisaged separate concentric rings of public buildings, parks, retail space, residential areas and industrial areas, all surrounded by open space and farmland. All retail activity was to be conducted within a single glass-roofed building, an early concept for the modern shopping centre inspired by the Crystal Palace.

In 1916, New York City enacted the first city-wide zoning ordinance. Zoning ordinances like this one went beyond the earlier city plans to create a process for setting guidelines for what could be built where.

The application of single-use zoning has led to the distinctive form of many cities in the United States, Canada, Australia and New Zealand, in which a very dense urban core, often containing skyscrapers, is surrounded by low density residential suburbs, characterised by large gardens and leafy streets. Some metropolitan areas such as Minneapolis–St Paul, the San Francisco Bay Area, and Sydney have several such cores.

== Mixed-use zoning ==
Mixed-use zoning combines residential, commercial, office, and public uses into a single space. Mixed-use zoning can be vertical, within a single building, or horizontal, involving multiple buildings.

Examples of mixed-use zoning include:

- Melbourne, Victoria, Australia
- Baltimore, Maryland Baltimore, MD City Code, Art. 32 § 6-201 (2017).
- Saint Anthony, Idaho St. Anthony, ID Municipal Code §§ 17.06.090-17.06.120
