= Hamburger Börs, Turku =

Former hotel in Turku, Finland

Coordinates: 60°27′04″N 022°16′07″E

Hamburger Börs was a 1909 Art Nouveau hotel building in Turku, Finland, next to the Market Square. It was designed by Frithiof Strandell as an expansion to an existing hotel on Kauppiaskatu (the street along the northeast side of the square), and had 30 rooms. A brick warehouse stood in what was to become the inner yard of Strandell's expansion; rather than tearing it down, he had the Metropol film theatre built inside it. (Under the names Lyyra V and Rialto, the theatre later functioned until the 1960s.)

Oy Centrum Ab sold the property to the Turku cooperative in 1942, and the cooperative began considering how to make better use of the lot. Plans for a renovation began in the 1970s. Both the Finnish Museum Board and the Turku museum board wanted to protect the building. Proposals that involved dismantling it were published in 1976, and this drew media attention all around the country. There were differing opinions about whether the building should be protected; the intendant of the Turku Museum of Art, Erik Bergh, said that the building did not fit into its surroundings at all and could be dismantled.

The Turku city council accepted the plan to dismantle. The Finnish People's Democratic League, the museum boards, the provincial arts foundation of Turku and Pori, and Enemmistö ry (a group promoting public transport and pedestrians) opposed it. The Finnish government received complaints about the plan, but in December 1976 those complaints were dismissed, and dismantling could begin. Although the issue of protecting Port Arthur had awoken citizen activism in Turku, it was Hamburger Börs that made them demonstrate against dismantling for the first time. Dismantling began despite the protests, and a new hotel was built in 1979. The 1979 building was demolished in 2019 and replaced with another hotel.

The old 14-room Hamburger Börs hotel building on Kauppiaskatu that existed before 1909 was spared, and was reinforced in 2003. At the same time, elements in Strandell's original plans were restored to its facade and the coat of arms of Hamburg which had been on the facade since 1894 was restored. This building was originally a two-storey stone house from the 1830s; an extra floor was added along with Art Nouveau-style renovations in 1903 and 1904, according to plans by Strandell. The building's stained glass was designed by the German Willy Baer.

== Gallery ==
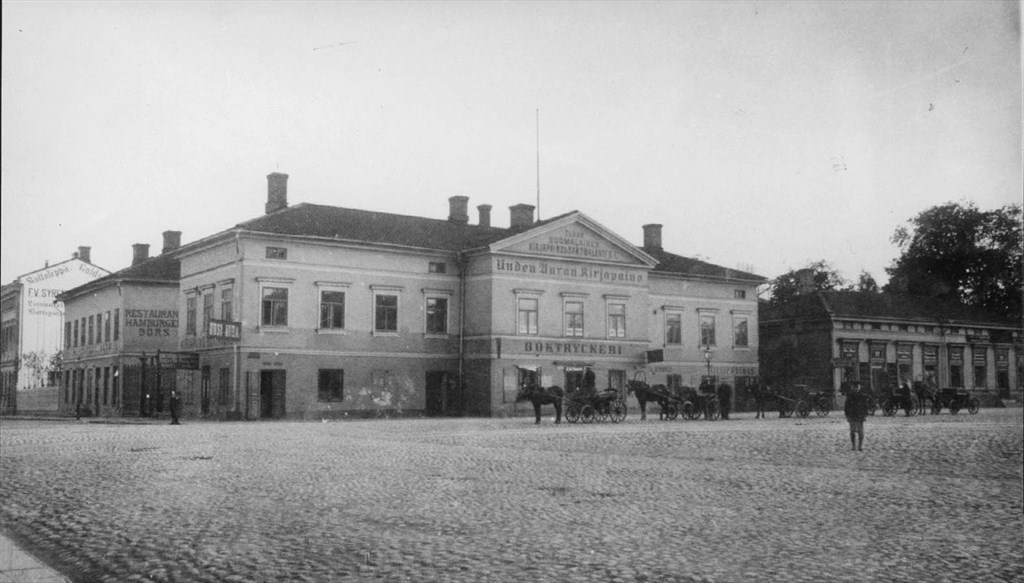
Two-floor stone "Restaurant Hamburger Börs" on Kauppiaskatu, built in 1830. Beside it (on Eerikinkatu facing the Market Square) is the Forss House, containing the press of the Uusi Aura newspaper. Photo from 1899.

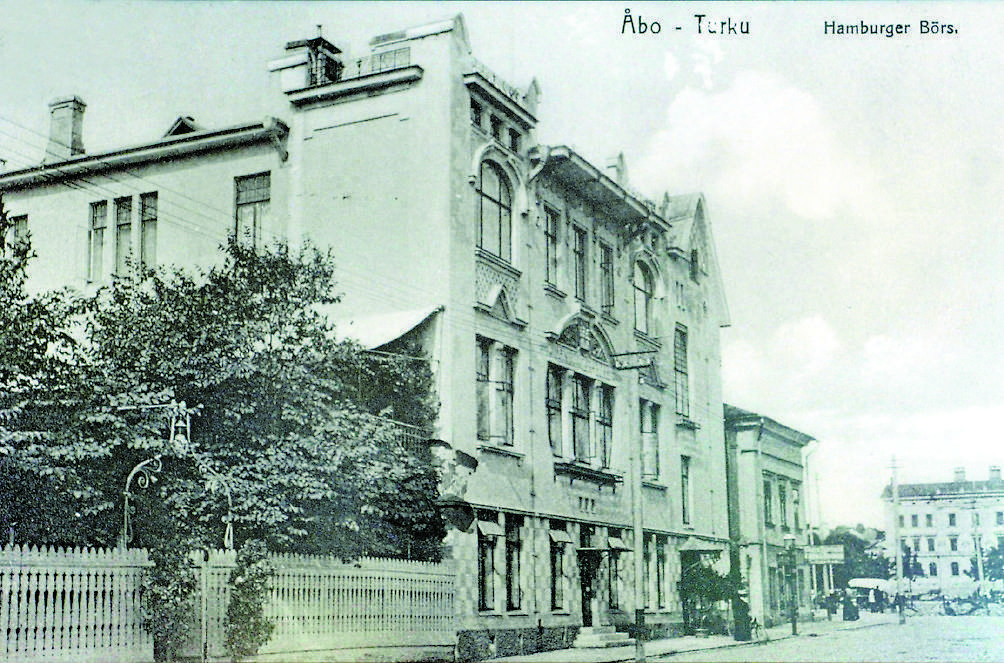
The same Hamburger Börs in the early 1900s, expanded to a third floor and renovated in Art Nouveau style. The Forss House had not yet been dismantled.

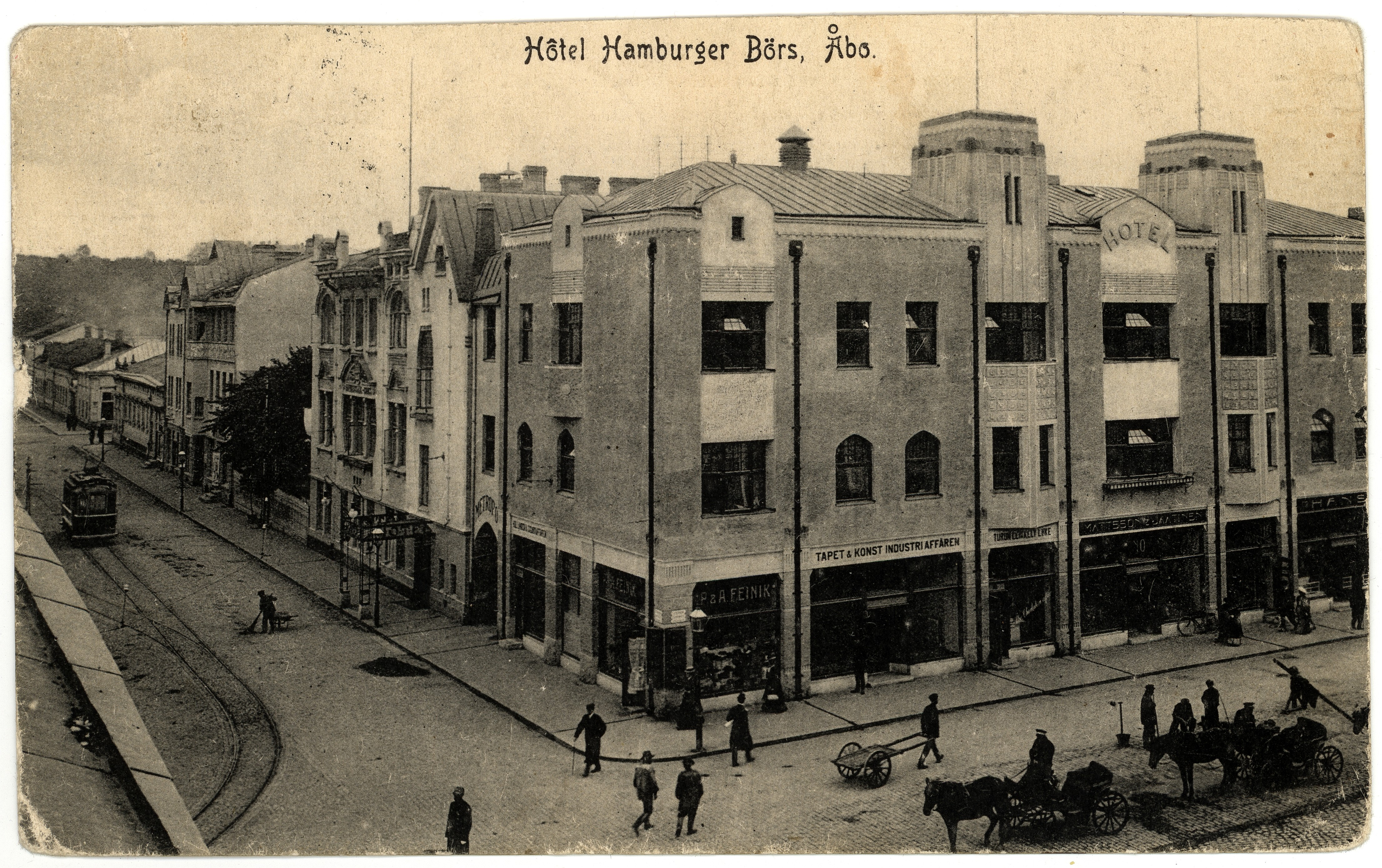
The 1909 expansion included replacing the Forss House and keeping the earlier Hamburger Börs. Photo from 1910.

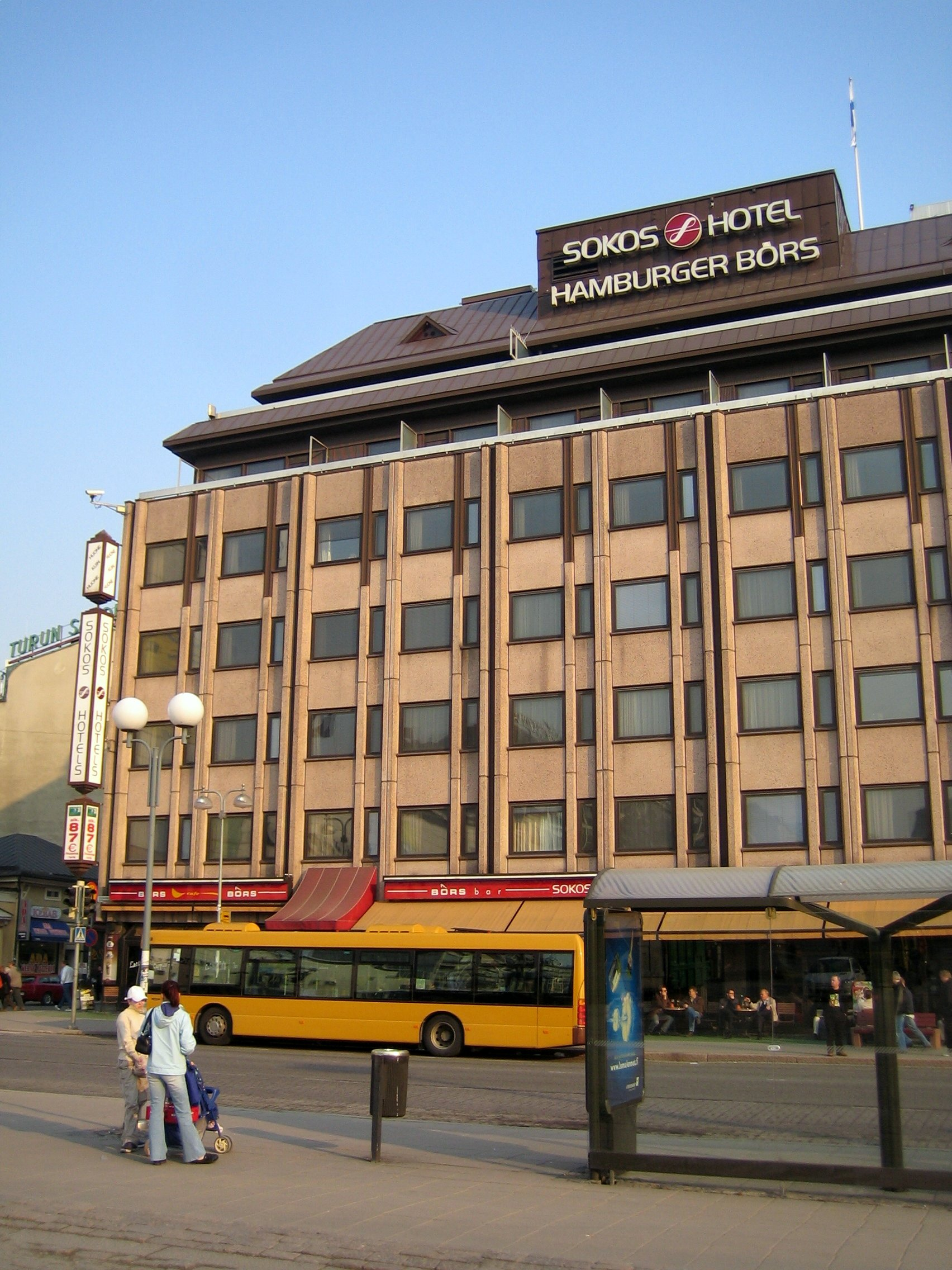
The Hamburger Börs hotel between 1979 and 2019, designed by Pauli Lehtinen, which replaced the 1909 expansion but preserved the original building (not pictured).

== Sources ==
- Lahtinen, Rauno: Turun puretut talot. Sammakko, 2013, Tallinn (5th edition). ISBN 978-952-483-266-3.
