= World Cultural Council 31st Award Ceremony =

- Cover page of event invitation
- Date: November 17, 2014
- Location: Dipoli Hall, Otakaari 1 Building, Aalto University, Espoo
- Country: Finland
- Presented by: World Cultural Council
- Hosted by: Professor Tuula Teeri
- Rewards: Medal, diploma and $10,000US

Highlights
- Albert Einstein World Award of Science: Professor Sir Philip Cohen
- José Vasconcelos World Award of Education: Professor Federico Rosei
- Website: wcc.aalto.fi/en/

The World Cultural Council performed its 31st Award Ceremony on November 17, 2014 at the Dipoli Hall, Otakaari 1 Building, Aalto University, Espoo, Finland. Aalto University acted as the host and co-organizer of the event, which was the opening act prior to the Aalto University Academic Summit titled "The Impact of Universities on Economic Growth."

The WCC presented awards to two distinguished scientists. Acclaimed enzymologist Professor Sir Philip Cohen received the Albert Einstein World Award of Science for his forty-year research into cellular communication. Professor Federico Rosei accepted the José Vasconcelos World Award of Education, granted for his excellence in the field of university teaching.

Jussi Nuorteva, Director of the National Archives of Finland and member of the WCC, presented the Winners' Book to the laureates. Professor Sir Philip Cohen and Professor Federico Rosei signed the book in presence of witnesses from Aalto University and WCC.

Also, the WCC conferred Aalto University President, Professor Tuula Teeri, the Medal for Educational Merit.

As part of the award ceremony, honorary mentions were granted to Aalto University researchers Assistant Professor Camilla Hollanti, Assistant Professor Katri Kauppi, Assistant Professor Mauri Kostiainen, Doctoral Candidate Matti Kuittinen, Assistant Professor Jani Romanoff and Assistant Professor Hele Savin.

Finally, Professor Edmond Fischer handed over the Presidential Emblem to Professor Sir Colin Blakemore, a founding member of the council. The WCC acknowledged the work of Professor Fischer, in the last eight years as Honorary President, and in the last fifteen supporting the work of the council. The first duty of Professor Blakemore as new Honorary President was to present the Presidential Emeritus medal to Professor Fischer.

Prior to the award ceremony, Professor Sir Philip Cohen presented the lecture "Protein Kinases, the Major Drug Targets of the 21st Century." Also, Professor Federico Rosei gave the lecture "What Type of Energy for the Future of Humanity?". Furthermore, Nobel laureate Professor Edmond Fischer performed a public lecture in support of the ceremony.
