= Atte Harjanne =

Finnish politician

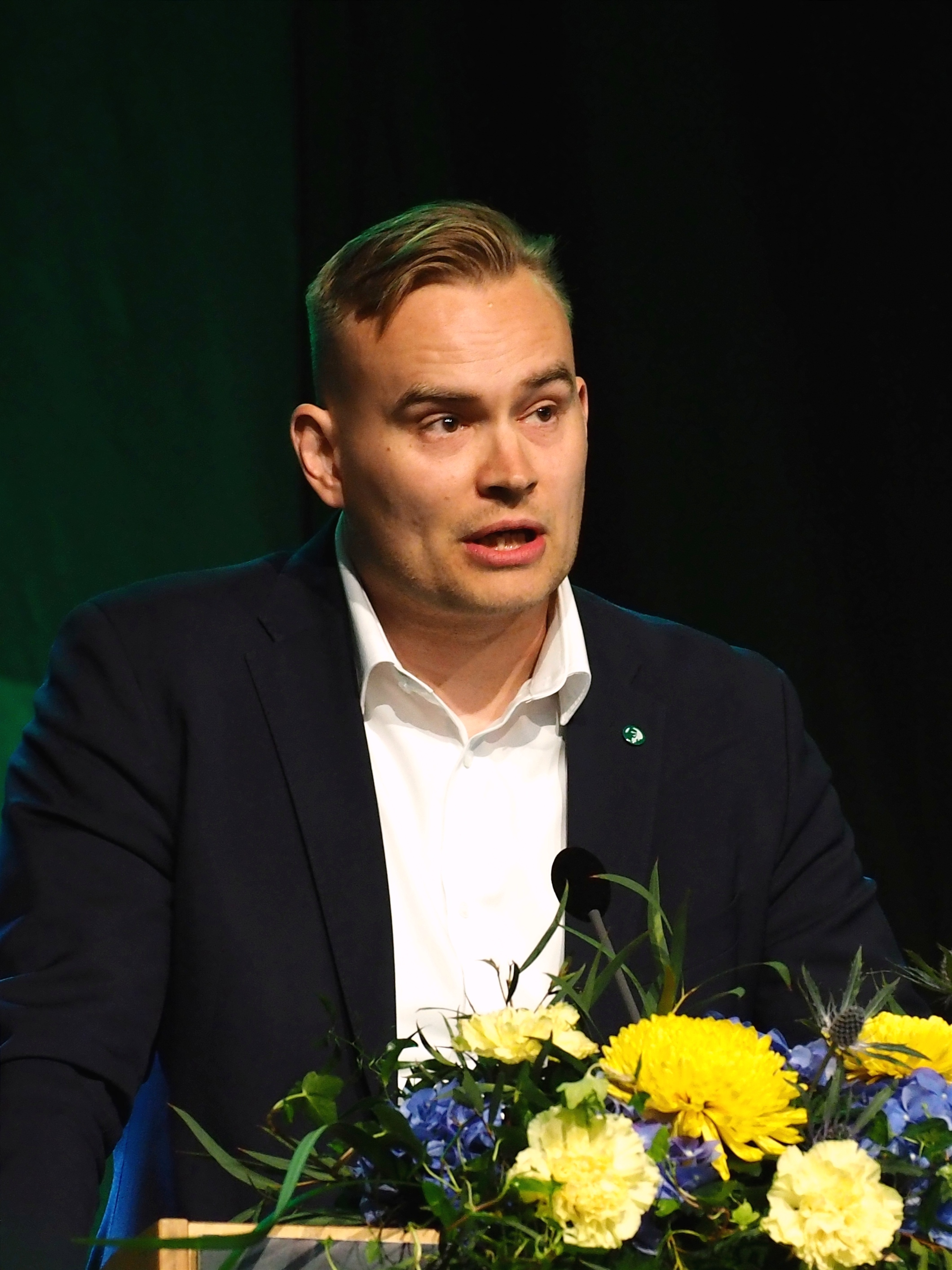
- Harjanne in 2023

Chairperson of the Green League parliamentary group
- Incumbent
- Assumed office 28 October 2021
- Preceded by: Emma Kari

Member of the Finland Parliament for Helsinki
- Incumbent
- Assumed office 17 April 2019

Personal details
- Born: 13 July 1984 (age 42) Helsinki, Uusimaa, Finland
- Party: Green League
- Education: Aalto University (MA)

Military service
- Rank: Reserve Captain

Atte Erik Harjanne (born 13 July 1984 in Helsinki) is a Finnish politician currently serving in the Parliament of Finland for the Green League at the Helsinki constituency.

Since October 2021, Harjanne has been the chairperson of the Green League's parliamentary group.

== Education and career ==
Harjanne graduated from Mäkelänrinte high school in 2003. He graduated with a master's degree in engineering from the Aalto University School of Electrical Engineering in 2012, majoring in user-oriented communication technology. He has also been a doctoral student at the Aalto University School of Economics.

From 2012 to 2013, Harjanne worked at Deloitte & Touche LLP as a risk management consultant. From 2013 to 2019, he worked as a researcher in the Weather and Climate Change Impact Research Results Unit of the Finnish Meteorological Institute. Harjante's research area was weather and climate risk management and utilization of climate information..

== Political career ==
Harjanne was previously a member of the National Coalition Party. During his studies, he served as the education policy officer of the Aalto University Student Union in 2010 and as the chairman of the Representative Council in 2011. He joined the Green League while working in Pekka Haavisto's presidential election campaign in 2012 and was elected to the Helsinki City Council in 2017.

Harjanne has also been involved in investigating the hybrid threat impact on Helsinki, and he served as a member of the Greens League's security policy expert working group from 2016 to 2017. He has been a member of the board of the City of Helsinki's business department and the vice-chairman of the Helsinki Region Environmental Services Municipal Corporation since 2017.

Harjanne was elected the Member of Parliament for Helsinki in the 2019 parliamentary election. During the election period, Harjanne was a member of the advisory board of the Finnish Institute of International Affairs, and he was also a member of the large committee and the economic and defense committees.

Harjanne in the Helsinki Pride parade in the summer of 2023.

In the fall of 2019, a meme about Harjante circulated on the internet, which collected pictures from several trips he made abroad in different continents. The pictures were collected from his Instagram page. According to Harjanne, a large proportion of the trips were work-related. He also said that he considers criticism of his air travel desirable.

In September 2021, at the Green League meeting, Harjanne was elected vice-chairman of the party. In October 2021, Harjanne was elected chairman of the Green League parliamentary group to replace Emma Kari, who moved to the position of Minister of the Environment and Climate Change in the Marin cabinet.

In the 2023 parliamentary election, Harjanne was elected for a second term with 5,804 votes.[5] He works in parliament as a member of the Foreign Affairs Committee and the Transport and Communications Committee. In addition, Harjanne is a member of the advisory board of the Finnish Institute of International Affairs.

Harjanne has been a member of the board of the energy company Helen Oy since 2023 and served as its chairman from 2023 to 2025.

Harjanne was a candidate in the 2024 European Parliament election. He received 19,693 votes and came in second place.

In the 2025 municipal elections, Harjanne was the Green League's candidate for the Mayor of Helsinki. After the elections, Harjanne refused the offered position of deputy mayor and continued as an MP.

== Political views ==
Based on responses to election compass questionnaires, Harjanne is positioned in the political center or center-right. In Yle’s election compass, Harjanne is positioned firmly on the liberal side of the value spectrum. According to the GAL–TAN spectrum used by the Helsingin Sanomat's election compass, Harjanne’s views reflect a liberal-green (GAL) stance. In the views Harjanne expressed for the HS election compass, right-wing and liberal-green opinions are the most prominent..

Harjanne is considered to belong to the economic-right, market-liberal wing of the Greens.

Harjanne signed Seta's candidacy pledge in the 2019 and 2023 parliamentary elections. As a signatory to the candidate pledge, Harjanne is committed to supporting the goals of gender and sexual minorities in his parliamentary work, to oppose discrimination and hate speech, and to promote the participation of those groups in decision-making.

During his campaign for Parliament, Harjanne ran on a platform of climate values. According to him, for example, curbing climate change and stopping the loss of species are "the number one issues in politics".

Harjanne is known for his positive stance on nuclear energy; he has proposed utilizing nuclear energy for the production of district heating in Helsinki.

During the 2019 parliamentary election, Harjanne supported Finland's NATO membership.

== Personal life ==
Harjante has one child with his wife Salla Koivu (b. 2023). He lives with his family in Herttoniemi, Helsinki.

Harjanne likes reading, exercise and reservist activities. He holds the military rank of reserve captain.
