= Metsähovi =

Metsähovi may refer to:

- 2486 Metsähovi, a main-belt asteroid
- Metsähovi Radio Observatory, Finland
