= HIIT (disambiguation) =

HIIT is high-intensity interval training.

HIIT may also refer to:

- Helsinki Institute for Information Technology, a computer science research institute in Helsinki, Finland
- Hamdard Institute of Information Technology, a computer science institute at Hamdard University in Karachi, Pakistan
- "HIIT", an episode of How Heavy Are the Dumbbells You Lift?
- HIIT Brands, and activeware company acquired by ASOS
