= Kauppakorkeakoulun Ylioppilaskunnan Laulajat =

Helsinki Academic Male Choir KYL Kauppakorkeakoulun Ylioppilaskunnan Laulajat
- Also known as: KYL
- Origin: Helsinki, Finland
- Genres: A cappella, Choral music
- Years active: 1949–present
- Website: kyl.fi

Helsinki Academic Male Choir KYL (in Finnish: Kauppakorkeakoulun Ylioppilaskunnan Laulajat or KYL), founded in 1949, is an academic male choir from Helsinki, Finland. The choir is associated closely with Aalto University School of Business, consisting mainly of students and alumni of the university.

The choir's artistic range spans classical Finnish (e.g. by Jean Sibelius, Leevi Madetoja, Toivo Kuula, Selim Palmgren, and Armas Järnefelt) and international male choir music, modern compositions (e.g. by Einojuhani Rautavaara and Jaakko Mäntyjärvi), barbershop, as well as pop music arrangements. KYL has participated in several international competitions and toured extensively abroad. The choir performs regularly in the Helsinki metropolitan area.

In 2018 Master of Music Visa Yrjölä became the artistic director of the choir. Previous artistic directors include Matti Apajalahti (1997–2017), Raul Talmar (1992–97), Heikki Saari (1975–92), Aapeli Vuoristo, Kaj Chydenius, Ensti Pohjola, Ahti Sonninen, and Jorma Tolonen.

== Awards ==
- Winner (40 voices and under) & Champion Choir - The V Cornwall International Male Voice Choir Competition 2011
- Winner (international series) - The V International Leevi Madetoja Choir Competition 2010
- Finnish Male Choir of the Year 1998

== Tours ==
- USA and Canada 2010
- Spain 2009
- China 2006
- Germany 2003
- Brazil 2002

== Discography ==
- Larin-Kyösti - Elämän kertoja (2013, "Larin-Kyösti - Narrator of The Life")
- Kirje Korvatunturille (2008 "A Letter to Santa Claus")
- Hämärän ääniä (2008, "Sounds of Twilight")
- Kullervo (2005)
- Maailma jääkukkien takana (2001, "The World Behind Frost Flowers")
- Legenda (1999, "Legend")

== See also ==
- Aalto University School of Business
- The Academic Female Choir KYN
