= Brunila =

Brunila is a Finnish surname. Notable people with the surname include:

- Anne Brunila (born 1957), Finnish economist
- Teemu Brunila (born 1976), Finnish musician
