= OUBS =

OUBS may refer to:

- Otaniemi Underground Broadcasting System, cable-TV channel of Aalto University Student Union (AYY)
- Oxford University Broadcasting Society, a student society at the University of Oxford, England
