= Aalto University Library =

Scientific library in Aalto University, Espoo, Finland

Aalto University Library, from 2015 called Aalto University Learning Centre is a service unit of Aalto University. The library is a scientific service organization free for everyone to use. It provides support for the diverse research, education, studying, and artistic activities of the university. Aalto University Library was established on January 1, 2010, by the merger of the libraries of Helsinki University of Technology, the Helsinki School of Economics, and the University of Art and Design Helsinki.

== Harald Herlin Learning Centre (1970–) ==
60°11′5.02″N 24°49′40.05″E

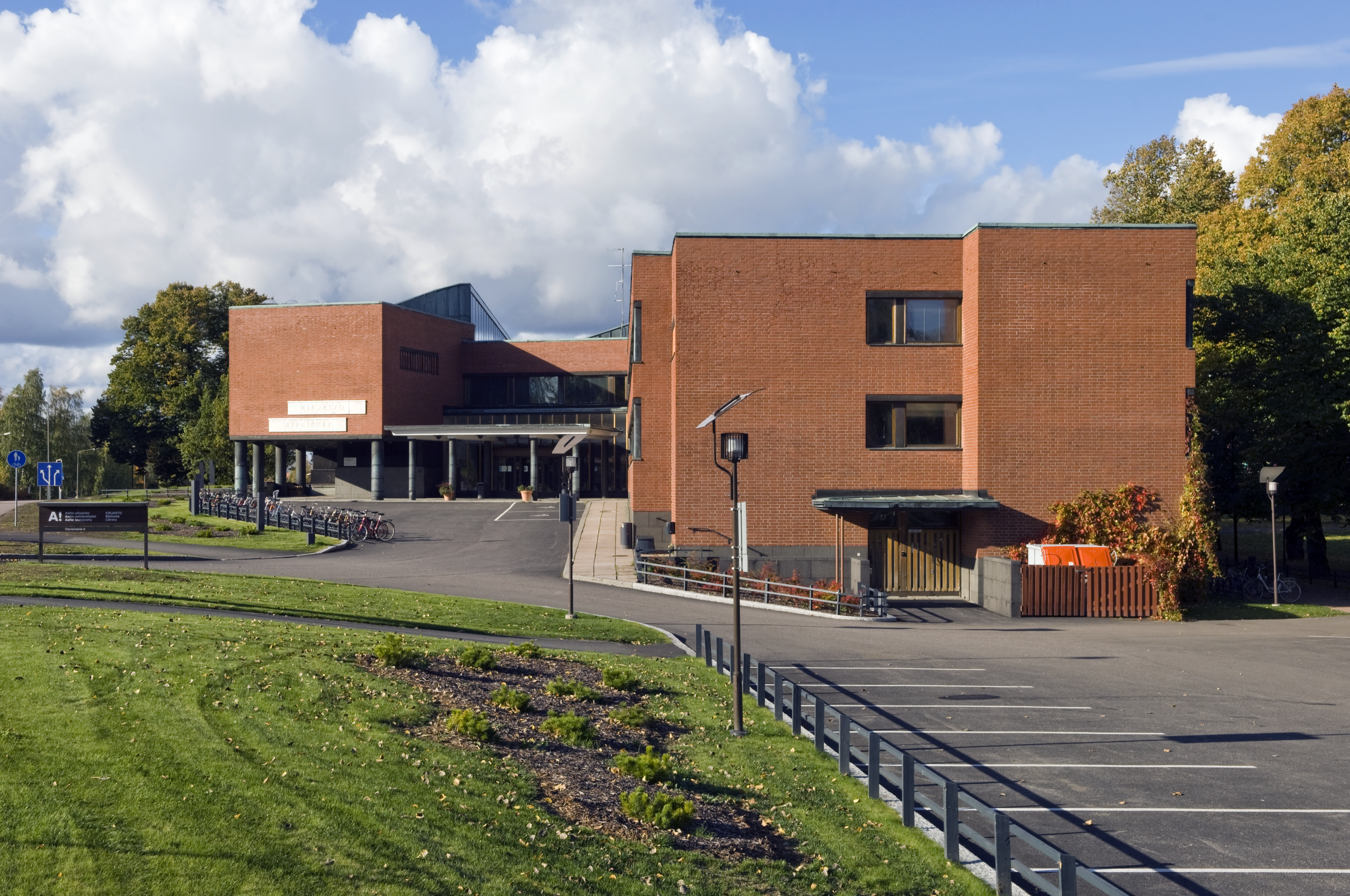
Harald Herlin Learning Centre

The Otaniemi Campus Library is officially known as Aalto University Library, Otaniemi and is located in Espoo, on the Otaniemi Campus of the Aalto University. The main building of the library is designed by architect Alvar Aalto like all the other key buildings at the Otaniemi campus area. The four-storey building was completed in 1969. It has 8942 square metres of floor space. Customers and guests have free access to the service areas of the second floor and to the collection areas of the first and ground floors. The library was known as the Helsinki University of Technology Library before the merger.

The visiting address of the library is Otaniementie 9.

In May 2015 the library building went under renovation. Thus, the library moved temporarily to Otakaari 1 X (A wing) with the new name Learning Center beta. The renovation was completed in 2016.

== Arabia Campus Library (1875–2018) ==
60°12′33.99″N 24°58′34.88″E

Arabia Campus Library

The Arabia Campus Library was officially known as Aalto University Library, Arabia and is located in Helsinki, on the Arabia Campus of the Aalto University. The Library first opened in 1875 starting as the library of the Finnish Society for Crafts and Design and its school. In 1973–2009 the library served as a University of Art and Design Library. The library was known as the University of Art and Design Helsinki Library before the merger.

The Arabia Campus Library was part of the Aralis Library Center. The Aralis Library Center was a public library open to all, which also brought together the Helsinki City Library's Arabianranta Library and two other art libraries: the Cultural Library Services of the Metropolia University of Applied Sciences and the Pop & Jazz Conservatory Library.

The Aralis Library Center was completed in two phases: the Art Libraries moved to new premises in June 2003 and the Arabianranta Library in December 2003. The Aralis Library Center totaled 2192 m², of which the Arabian Campus Library accounted for 61.7% (1352 m²). The section of the Art Library in the old building of the Arabia factory, 1352 m², was designed by Tuomo Siitonen Oy.

The visiting address of the library was Hämeentie 135 A.

The library was shut down 2018 when Aalto University contracted at Otaniemi campus.

== Töölö Campus Library (–2018) ==
60°10′11.76″N 24°55′17.87″E

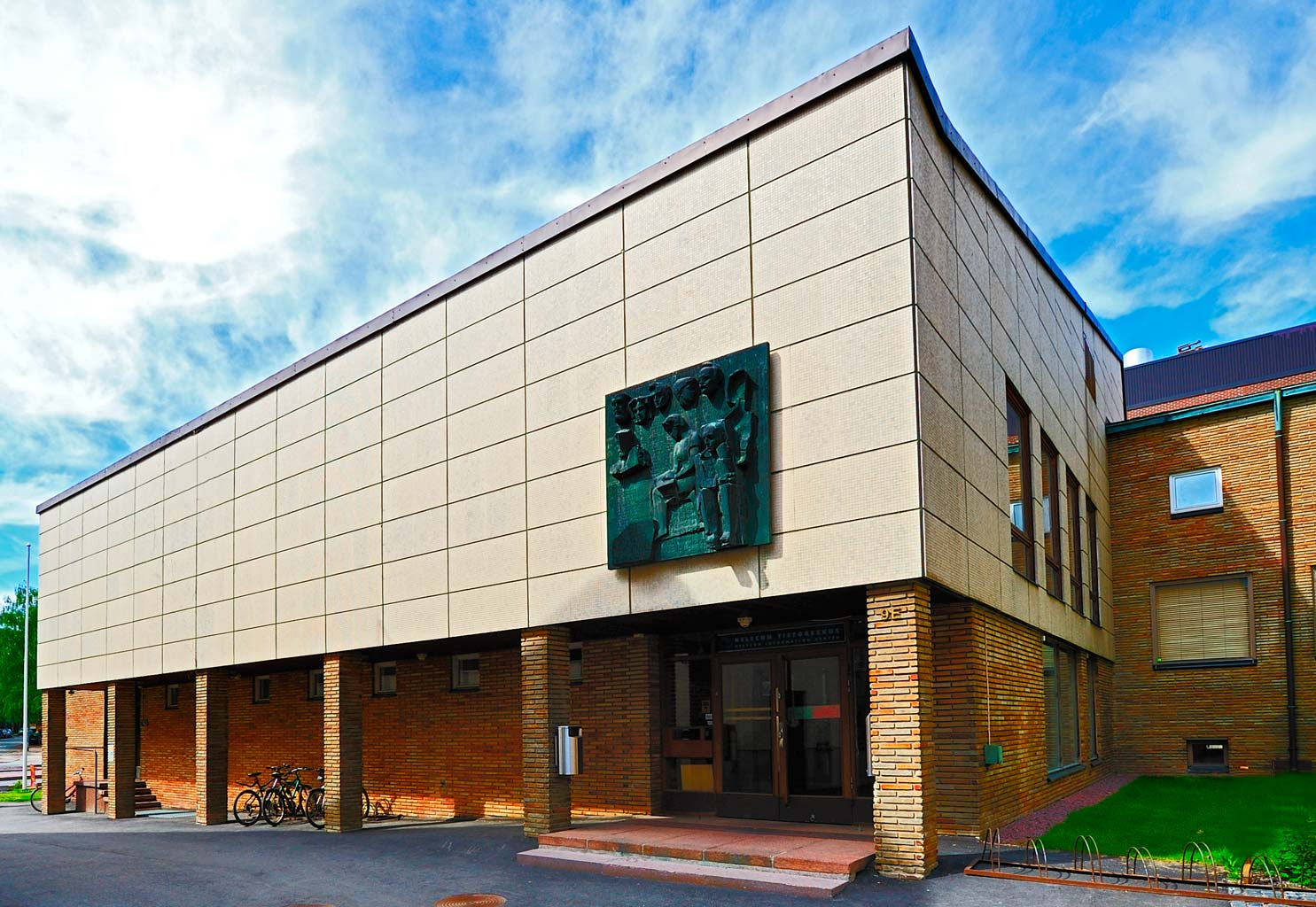
Töölö Campus Library

The Töölö Campus Library was officially known as Aalto University Library, Töölö and is located in Helsinki, on the Töölö Campus of the Aalto University. The library was known as the Helsinki School of Economics Library before the merger.

The visiting address of the library is Mechelininkatu 3 D.

The library was shut down 2018 when Aalto University contracted at Otaniemi campus.

== See also ==
- List of libraries in Finland

== Notes ==
- "Aralis" (in Finnish). Aralis Library and Information Centre. 2012. Archived from the original on 2012-05-07.
- "Aalto University Library, Otaniemi" (in Finnish). Aalto University. 2011. Archived from the original on 2012-08-25.
- "Contact information" (in Finnish). Aalto University. 2012.
- "Aalto University Library, Töölö" (in Finnish). Helecon Information Center. 2012. Archived from the original on 2012-11-15.
