= Otahalli =

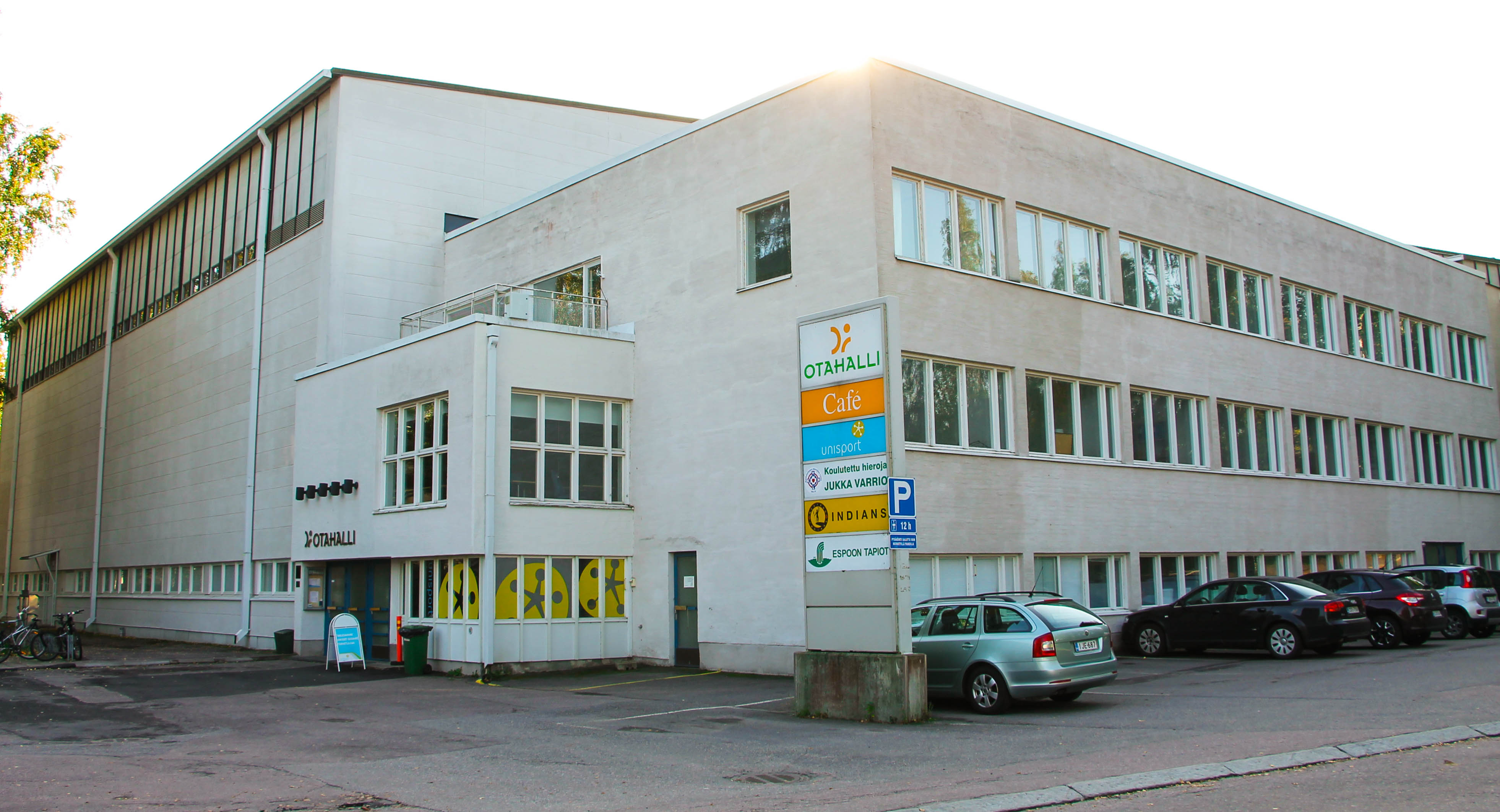

General information
- Address: Otaranta 6
- Town or city: FI-02150 Espoo
- Country: Finland
- Coordinates: 60°11.06′N 24°50.08′E
- Completed: 1952

Design and construction
- Architect(s): Alvar Aalto

Other information
- Seating capacity: 500

Otahalli is a sports venue in the Otaniemi district of Espoo, Finland. It is situated adjacent to the Aalto University campus.

== History ==
When completed, Otahalli was the largest indoor sports venue in Finland. It was designed by architect Alvar Aalto in preparation for the 1952 Helsinki Olympics.

== Architecture ==
Aalto's design is notable for its long wooden truss that spans 45 metres (148 ft).

The materials used in the winding stairways and wooden roof structures represent typical Aalto functionalism.

== Sports activities ==
Otahalli is operated by Unisport which provides sporting activities to the public.

The athletics club Espoon Tapiot also uses Otahalli as its home arena. It is one of Finland's leading athletics clubs with around 1,300 members, in all age groups and levels.

Otahalli also hosts the Westend Indians sports club as their home arena.

== Non-sport activities ==
In November 2022, Otahalli the Aalto Talent Expo 2022 by Aalto University Student Union for 120+ employer organizations and students from all Aalto University.
