= Aalto University School of Engineering =

University in Espoo, Finland

- Aalto-yliopiston insinööritieteiden korkeakoulu Aalto-universitetets högskola för ingenjörsvetenskaper
- Established: 1 January 2011
- Dean: Professor Kari Tammi
- Academic staff: 800 (incl staff)
- Students: 3,444 (2012)
- Location: Espoo, Finland; 60°11′01″N 24°49′20″E
- Campus: Urban, Inner City
- Website: eng.aalto.fi/en

Aalto University School of Engineering (Finnish: Aalto-yliopiston insinööritieteiden korkeakoulu, Swedish: Aalto-universitetets högskola för ingenjörsvetenskaper) is part of Aalto University. It is one of the four new schools of technology established on 1 January 2011 from Aalto University School of Science and Technology, formerly known as Helsinki University of Technology. The four new schools continue to offer education and research that promotes advances in science and technology. The Department of Architecture was part of the School of Engineering until 2012, when it was restructured into the Aalto University School of Arts, Design and Architecture.

The School of Engineering teaches and researches sustainable development, global warming, energy conservation and clean energy, and the sustainable use of natural resources. In 2018, Aalto University had a World University Ranking of 140, and was ranked 9th overall in the Top 50 under 50.

The School operates in the fields of applied mechanics, civil and environmental engineering, energy and HVAC technology, mechanical engineering, real estate economics, geomatics, structural engineering and building technology, and urban and regional studies.

== Departments ==
- Department of Built Environment
- Department of Civil Engineering
- Department of Energy and Mechanical Engineering

Other units

- Center for Energy Technology (CET)

== International Master´s degree programmes (2012-2013) ==
- Environomical Pathways for Sustainable Energy Systems (SELECT) (Erasmus Mundus)
- Creative Sustainability
- Managing Spatial Change
- Real Estate Investment and Finance
- Structural Engineering
- Mechanical Engineering
- Minerals and Environmental Programme (EMMEP)
- Nordic Master Programme in Environmental Engineering
- Nordic Master Programme in Innovative and Sustainable Energy Engineering
- Nordic Master Programme in Maritime Engineering
