= Hele Savin =

Finnish inventor, professor

Hele Irene Savin
- Born: Hele Väinölä; 1 August 1977 (age 49); Imatra, Finland
- Education: Aalto University
- Occupations: Inventor, professor
- Known for: High-efficiency solar cells using nanostructured, black silicon

Hele Irene Savin (née Väinölä; born 1 August 1977 in Imatra) is a Finnish scientist and inventor, best known for her research in solar cells and is a professor of micro and nanoelectronics at Aalto University. She is publicly known as an inventor and developer of high-efficiency solar cells using nanostructured, so-called black silicon.

== Life and work ==
Savin graduated from the Helsinki University of Technology (now part of Aalto University) with a master's degree in engineering (2000) and a doctorate in technology (2005). Her English-language dissertation, titled Controlling iron and copper Precipitation in Silicon wafers, studied ways in which silicon materials that are used in electronics can be more economical.

During her postgraduate studies, Savin visited the United States as a visiting researcher at the Lawrence Berkeley National Laboratory in Berkeley, California (2002–2003). As a postdoc researcher, she worked at the Fraunhofer Institute for Solar Energy Systems in Freiburg, Germany (2009–2010). Later, she was a visiting professor at the Massachusetts Institute of Technology (2013) in Cambridge Massachusetts.

Savin is listed by the U.S. Patent Office as co-inventor of nine patented devices.

Savin received awards for her "pioneering research" in solar energy development of efficient solar cells with, among other things, the World Economic Forum's Young Scientist Award (2013), and the Parliament's EUR 110,000 Women's Innovation Award (2017). She is a member of the Academy of Technical Sciences.
