= Anne Brunila =

Finnish economist

- Born: 31 August 1957 (age 68)
- Occupations: Professor, Investor, Manager of the Bank of Finland, and Manager of the European Commission
- Board member of: Sanoma, Stora, Enso, Kone, Aalto
- Children: 1
- Honours: Ability to select the winner of the Finlandia award

Anne Maritta Brunila (born 31 August 1957) was the Executive Vice President, Corporate Relations and Sustainability at Fortum Corporation from 2009 to 2013. She has a P.h.D in Economics and Business Administration from Helsinki School of Economics. Brunila has been described as "one of the most influential women in the Finnish economy."

== Biography ==
In 1983 Brunila's son suffered a brain damaging fever, resulting in him being unable to read or write as an adult. In 2012, she was chosen to select that year's Finlandia Award. On 12 October 2012 she decided to resign from her position at Kone to pursue new careers and activities after her father's death. However, Brunila was unable to officially stop working at the company until 2013. She was replaced by Helena Aatinen. Brunila was tasked with promoting the creative sector of the Finnish economy in 2016 by the Finnish Ministry of Education and Culture.

== Positions ==
Term length	Position	Organization or Company
1992-2000	Executive Positions	Bank of Finland
2000-2002	Advisor	European Commission
2003-2006	Director General	Finnish Ministry of Finance
2006-2009	President and CEO	Finnish Forest Industries Federation
2009-2012	Executive Vice President of Corporate Relations and Strategy and Senior Vice President of Communications	Fortum
2009–present	Board of Directors	Kone
2014–present	Professor of Practice	Hanken University
2016–present	Board of Directors	Aalto University
2020–present	Board of Directors	Sanoma
2020–present	Board of Directos	Eera
2020–present	Board of Directors	Sampo
2020–present	Board of Directors	Finnish Film Foundation
2020–present	Chairwoman of the Sustainability and Ethics Committee	Stora Enso.

== Books ==
Book	Date Published	Source
Fiscal Policy and Private Consumption-Saving Decisions: European Evidence	1997	
Public Finances in the XXI Century: Limitations, Challenges and Directions of Reforms in Finland in	2000	
Fiscal Policy in Europe: How Effective Are Automatic Stabilizers?	2002	
Cyclical Stabilisation Under the Stability and Growth Pact: How Effective are Automatic Stabilisers?	2002	
Indicators of the Cyclically Adjusted Budget Balance: The Bank of Finland's Experience.	N/A	
