= Software Industry Survey =

The Software Industry Survey is an annual, for-the-public scientific survey about the size, composition, current state and future of the software industry and companies in Europe with origin in Finland.

Apart from these reports, the survey's data is used as input for various scientific studies based on the collected data. Results are also used by media companies like newspapers as source for news articles.

== History ==
Previously used logo

The survey organization was led (in 2010 and 2011) by the Software Business Lab research group of the BIT research centre at Aalto University, School of Science and Technology (former Helsinki University of Technology) with the help of several industry partners. Researchers from the Helsinki University of Technology and Centres of Expertise first organized this survey in 1997 to provide an overview of the Finnish software industry with financing mainly from the National Technology Agency (Tekes) and the Finnish Ministry of Trade and Industry. The 2011 Finnish survey received responses from 506 participants which is a bit smaller than 2010 due to more strict selection criteria. Surveys analysing the industry in other European countries than Finland are run by research partners. In 2011 the survey was implemented in Austria and Germany.

The published reports by the survey group cover economic impacts on the software industry such as the Great Recession or Nokia’s changes for Symbian in 2011, on roughly 100 pages. Starting with the 2009 report, all included images and tables can be re-used under the free Creative Commons Attribution license version 3.0.

== Past surveys and key results ==
=== Software Industry Survey 2022 ===
The 2022 survey was carried out in cooperation between the University of Jyväskylä, Software Finland, University of Vaasa and Technology Industries of Finland.

As the pandemic was only beginning to subside, the economy was hit by Russia's invasion of Ukraine. Industries and companies that are able to grow even in difficult circumstances are therefore even more important for the economy and well-being of Finland as a whole.

The survey highlights strong growth in Finland's software industry, particularly in the Software-as-a-Service (SaaS) sector. While other industries are struggling, the software industry is making rapid progress, with more than 40% of companies expecting significant growth. SaaS in particular stands out, with 56% of companies predicting significant growth, making it a key export driver for Finland as the world continues to digitalise.

=== Software Industry Survey 2018 ===
The 2018 survey was conducted through interviews, exploring the main directions of business development, challenges, trends in the IT sector, and their impact on business growth for 99 software companies.

=== Software Industry Survey 2017 ===
The software and IT services sector grew by 5.9% in 2016, with growth seen across all company sizes: small, medium, and large. The 2017 survey highlights that companies remain growth-oriented and increasingly eager to expand internationally. Many companies are also driving innovation by experimenting with new technologies and business models.

The survey, now in its 20th year, analyzes the development of the Finnish software business and the outlook for software companies. This year, particular attention was paid to the industry's evolving skill requirements. The survey reveals that software companies are struggling to find talent that matches their needs, with a demand for thousands of skilled workers. The challenge is not just about the number of skilled professionals, but also about the rapidly changing skill requirements. The survey indicates that most software companies find it difficult to hire sufficient software professionals with the right expertise. Around half of the needed roles are related to programming and related tasks, but there is also demand for other types of expertise.

=== Software Industry Survey 2015 ===
The survey was conducted in two parts. The first part focused on the overall state of the industry. The second part, including a survey study with a short questionnaire, shall focus on details of software firms’ growth and internationalisation.

Analysis of publicly listed software and IT services companies reveals a slight revenue decline of 2.2% compared to the previous year. The positive aspect is that this decline is smaller than in previous years, and many companies have still managed to increase their revenues. This decline is attributed to structural changes in the industry, as demand shifts from customer-specific projects to cloud services. Despite this, the outlook remains promising, as companies are adapting and developing new capabilities to meet these industry changes.

=== Software Industry Survey 2014 ===
The 2014 Survey found that most companies favor agile methodologies over traditional plan-based approaches, prioritizing customer collaboration, flexibility, and individual empowerment. The study also highlighted differences in agility between software product firms, which tend to be more flexible, and service firms, which are more structured. Smaller firms were found to be more agile, leveraging individual strengths and maintaining openness to customer collaboration, while larger firms standardize their processes. These differences are linked to business models, with startups benefiting from greater agility and a focus on customer-oriented strategies.
