= 2486 Metsähovi =

Asteroid

2486 Metsahovi
Discovery
- Discovered by: Y. Vaisala
- Discovery site: Turku Obs.
- Discovery date: 22 March 1939

Designations
- Named after: farm near Helsinki; Metsähovi Radio Obs.
- Alternative designations: 1939 FY · 1961 TZ; 1970 FE · 1970 GN; 1975 WC · 1978 SW_{2}
- Minor planet category: main-belt · (inner)

Orbital characteristics
- Epoch 4 September 2017 (JD 2458000.5)
- Uncertainty parameter 0
- Observation arc: 78.11 yr (28,531 days)
- Aphelion: 2.4489 AU
- Perihelion: 2.0874 AU
- Semi-major axis: 2.2682 AU
- Eccentricity: 0.0797
- Orbital period (sidereal): 3.42 yr (1,248 days)
- Mean anomaly: 47.042°
- Mean motion: 0° 17^{m} 18.6^{s} / day
- Inclination: 8.4101°
- Longitude of ascending node: 359.97°
- Argument of perihelion: 101.37°
- Known satellites: 1

Physical characteristics
- Dimensions: 7.883±0.062 km 8.42±0.03 km 12.782 km
- Synodic rotation period: 4.4518 h (0.18549 d)
- Geometric albedo: 0.232±0.023; 0.268±0.031
- Absolute magnitude (H): 12.5

2486 Metsähovi, provisional designation 1939 FY, is a stony asteroid and synchronous binary system from the inner regions of the asteroid belt, approximately 10 kilometers in diameter. It was discovered on 22 March 1939, by Finnish astronomer Yrjö Väisälä at the Turku Observatory.

== Orbit and classification ==
Metsähovi orbits the Sun at a distance of 2.1–2.4 AU once every 3 years and 5 months (1,248 days). Its orbit has an eccentricity of 0.08 and an inclination of 8° with respect to the ecliptic.

== Naming ==
This minor planet was named for a donated farm near Helsinki, where various institutes have established their observing stations: the Finnish Geodetic Institute for space geodesy, the University of Helsinki for astrophysics, and the Helsinki University of Technology for radio astronomy. (Also see Metsähovi Radio Observatory). The approved naming citation was published by the Minor Planet Center on 26 May 1983 (M.P.C. 7946).

== Satellite ==
Satellite
Discovery
- Discovered by: M. Pikler, M. Husarik, G. Cervak, W. Cooney, J. Gross, D. Terrell, P. Pravec, P. Kusnirak, A. Galad, J. Vilagi, L. Kornos, S. Gajdos, V. Reddy, and R. Dyvig
- Discovery date: 2006/12/12
- Detection method: Light curve

Orbital characteristics
- Satellite of: 22486 Metsähovi

Physical characteristics
- Sidereal rotation period: 2.6404 hours

A moon was discovered in 2006 from lightcurve observations and announced in 2007.
