= Aalto University Executive Education =

Finnish education company

Aalto University Executive Education Ltd
- Type: Limited company, Ltd.
- Industry: Executive education and professional development
- Founded: 2010; 16 years ago
- Headquarters: Helsinki, Finland
- Area served: Europe, Asia
- Key people: Tom Lindholm (Group Managing Director); Petri Suomala (Chairman of the Board)
- Revenue: 19.7 million Euros (2025)
- Owner: Aalto University
- Number of employees: 129
- Subsidiaries: Aalto Executive Education Academy Pte Ltd (Singapore); Finva Finanssikoulutus Ltd
- Website: www.aaltoee.com

Aalto University Executive Education and Professional Development (also known as Aalto EE) is a Finnish company that offers executive education and professional development services for leaders, experts, and organizations. Aalto EE is owned by Aalto University.

Aalto EE has an office in Espoo, Helsinki and Singapore. In addition to Finland and Singapore, Aalto EE offers education programs in multiple locations worldwide, such as South Korea and Taiwan.

== History ==
- Aalto University's two executive education providers, HSE Executive Education and TKK School of Business, merged on 1 April 2010. The name of the new company is Aalto University Executive Education Ltd (Aalto EE).
- In 2014 the activities of Aalto EE have been extended to include the commercial professional development activities of both Aalto University Professional Development (Aalto PRO) and the School of Business' Small Business Center (PYK).
- In 2017 Aalto EE acquired the entire share capital of FINVA Financial Education Ltd (Finva Finanssikoulutus Oy) from the Insurance Sector Development Association (Vakuutustiedon Kehittämissäätiö). The company is now part of the Aalto EE Group.

== MBA and DBA programs ==
Aalto University Executive Education organizes Aalto University's MBA programs: Aalto MBA Program and Aalto Executive MBA Program. Aalto EE also organizes Aalto Executive Doctor of Business Administration program (Aalto Executive DBA).

== Open enrollment programs and customized services ==
In addition to MBA programs, Aalto EE offers open enrollment programs for individuals and customized services for companies that need education tailored for the company needs. All Aalto EE's open programs offer a pathway to the Aalto MBA and Aalto Executive MBA programs.

== Rankings ==
Aalto EE is ranked in Financial Times Executive Education and Executive MBA rankings. In the Financial Times Executive Education Ranking, Aalto EE ranked 28th globally in customized program ranking and 62nd in open enrollment program ranking in 2025. The Financial Times only ranks the top 95 customized program providers and the top 85 schools offering open-enrollment programs.

In 2025, the Aalto Executive MBA program ranked 50th in Europe and 92nd overall in Financial Times Executive MBA Ranking.

== Accreditations and networks ==
As a part of Aalto University Aalto EE holds three most respected business university accreditations:AACSB (The Association to Advance Colleagiate Schools of Business, US), EQUIS (the European Quality Improvement System Label, European Foundation for Management Development (EFMD)) and AMBA (Association of MBAs, UK).

Aalto University and Aalto EE are part of various networks: UNICON (The International University Consortium for Executive Education), EFMD (The European Foundation for Management Development) and PIM (Partnership in International Management). Aalto University School of Business is also a member of CEMS, a network united by the leading European universities and major companies.
