= Raul Talmar =

Estonian conductor

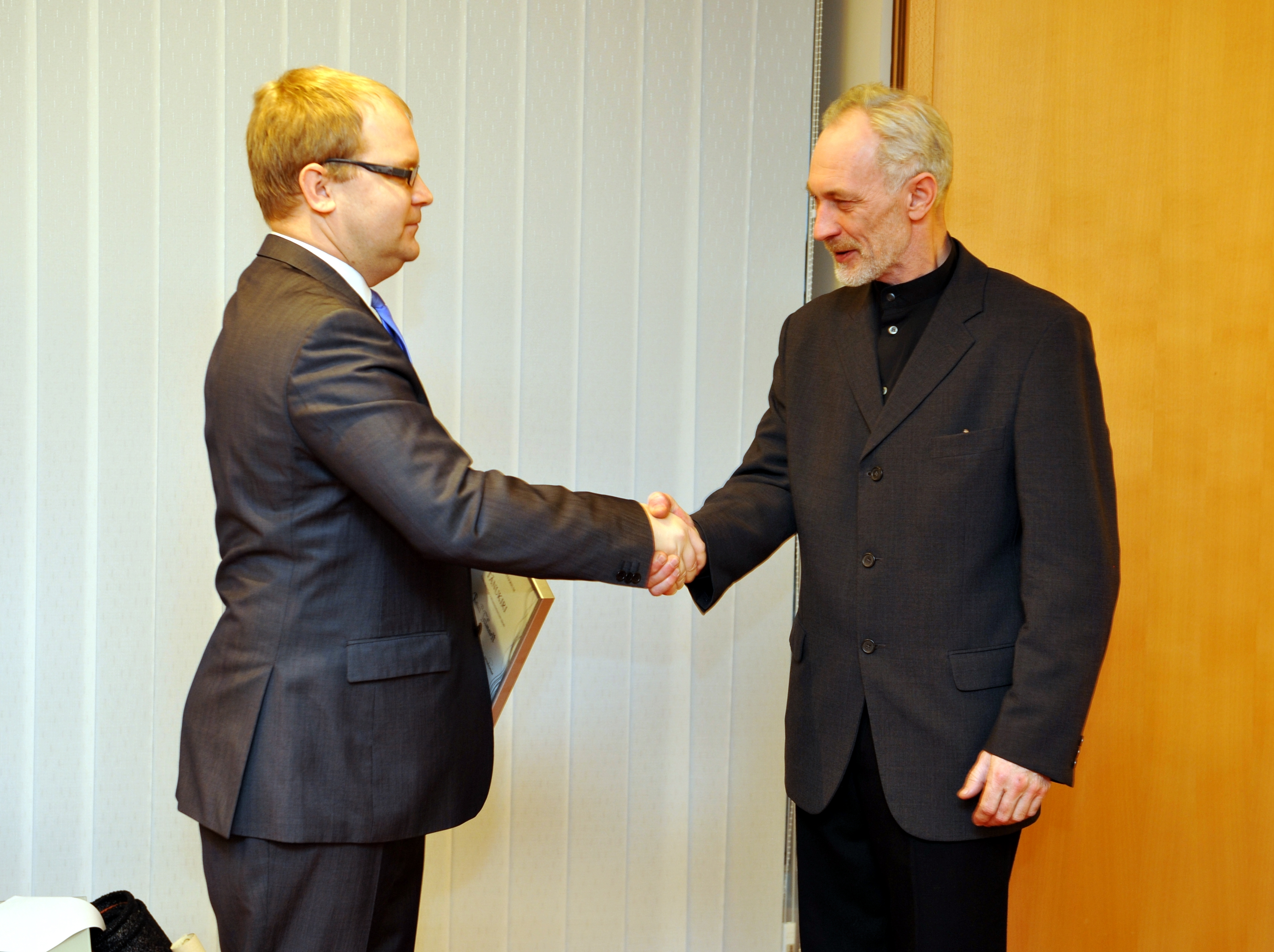
Urmas Paet and Raul Talmar (on the right) in 2012

Raul Talmar (born 6 January 1959 in Tallinn) is an Estonian choral conductor.

He graduated from the 22nd High School in Tallinn in 1977 and Tallinn State Conservatory.

Since 2008, he teaches choir conducting at Tallinn University. He is also the chairman of the Board of Estonian Song and Dance Festival. He has been the chairman of Estonian Choral Association.

He has conducted the Estonian Song Festival on numerous occasions.

In 2012, he was awarded the Order of the White Star, V class.
