= Helsinki Institute for Information Technology =

Joint research unit in Helsinki, Finland

Helsinki Institute for Information Technology HIIT (Finnish: Tietotekniikan tutkimuslaitos HIIT, Swedish: Forskningsinstitutet för informationsteknologi HIIT) is a joint research unit of two leading research universities in Helsinki, Finland, the University of Helsinki (UH) and Aalto University.

Established in 1999, the work of the institute is organised in four research programmes working on Computational Inference, Computational Health, Information Security and Augmented Research. Much of the work is carried out in competitively funded projects in co-operation with Finnish and international partners. The institute is led by Petri Myllymäki from University of Helsinki, who was selected to continue the work of Martti Mäntylä from Aalto University, Esko Ukkonen from University of Helsinki, Heikki Mannila from Aalto University, and Samuel Kaski from Aalto University. HIIT has about 200 researchers.
