= Otaniemi Underground Broadcasting System =

- Country: Finland
- Broadcast area: Otaniemi, Internet

Ownership
- Owner: Aalto University Student Union

History
- Launched: March 3, 1983
- Closed: May 31, 2011
- Former names: OtaRadio, OtaTv

Links
- Website: www.oubs.fi

Availability

OUBS, Otaniemi Underground Broadcasting System was the student television station of the Aalto University Student Union (AYY). In addition to broadcasting 24h on the Otaniemi cable network, OUBS offered its content on their website and over IPTV. OUBS had a staff of 10 people working in the basement of Jämeräntaival 1 A, Espoo, Finland. The homes of the staff of OUBS, the studio and the editing facilities were all located in that same address.

== History ==
Construction of Otaniemi student village finished in the early 1950s. Soon after that a central radio named OtaRadio was established. The student village served as housing during the 1983 World Championships in Athletics. This led to building a cable-TV network serving the apartments. The cable network enabled the student union (TKY) to create its own channel, OtaTV. The former telephone exchange was transferred into a TV studio. OtaTV and OtaRadio soon merged and formed OUBS. Until the end of 20th century, OUBS also was responsible for maintaining the cable network, both infrastructure and channels.
