= Global Alliance in Management Education =

Network of business schools in Europe

CEMS – The Global Alliance in Management Education
- Other names: CEMS
- Former names: Community of European Management Schools and International Companies
- Type: Network
- Established: 1988
- Chairman: Professor Gregory Whitwell, Dean of the University of Sydney Business School
- Executive Director: Nicole de Fontaines
- Academic staff: Combined from 34 schools
- Students: 1300+ of 80+ nationalities (2019–20 cohort)
- Location: 33 countries across 6 continents
- Campus: Multiple sites
- Alumni: 15,000+ (108 nationalities, work in over 75 countries)
- Website: www.cems.org

The CEMS – The Global Alliance in Management Education, or CEMS (formerly The Community of European Management Schools and International Companies), is a collaboration of leading business schools and universities with multinational companies and NGOs. The CEMS Global Alliance includes 34 academic institutions on every continent, nearly 70 corporate partners, and 8 social partners (NGOs) from around the globe. CEMS administers the delivery of the CEMS MIM (Master in International Management) degree in its member schools, supports the CEMS Alumni Association (CAA), and facilitates general cooperation among its members.

== CEMS MIM ==
CEMS Master in International Management (CEMS MIM) is a one-year degree program for a select group of students at the member institutions, taught jointly by CEMS business schools and universities. Created in 1988 by founding members from the University of Cologne, HEC Paris, ESADE and the Bocconi University, it was the first supra-national MSc. The aim of CEMS is to develop knowledge and provide education that is essential in the multilingual, multicultural and interconnected business world.

The MIM Programme consists of three terms: two academic terms and one internship term. The two academic terms must be consecutive, while the internship term can take place at any time during the graduate period of studies. Students must spend at least two out of the three terms abroad. In addition to completing one's home degree, graduation from CEMS also requires completion of a business project, skill seminars, an international internship, and two foreign language exams.

Each CEMS academic member has a limited number of places available. In many cases, schools have prerequisites to be admitted into the selection process, including a high-grade average and proof of language skills. The selection process typically requires the student to already be enrolled or selected for a Master of Business degree with a member university before applying for the CEMS MIM. CEMS graduates receive a degree from their home institution as well as from CEMS.

== Global ranking ==
The CEMS MIM has consistently ranked among the top 10 in the Masters in Management Ranking since 2005 by the Financial Times. Nonetheless, it has also consistently figured among top programs in the QS Top Universities' World University Rankings for Masters in Management worldwide since 2018.

	2026	2025	2024	2023	2022	2021	2020	2019	2018	2017	2016	2015	2014	2013	2012	2011	2010	2009	2008	2007	2006	2005	
QS Top Universities	4	10	11	12	15	16	8	8	8	-	-	-	-	-	-	-	-	-	-	-	-	-	-
Financial Times Ranking	-	-	-	-	-	-	-	10	8	9	9	—N/a	4	5	7	3	2	2	1	3	2	2	3

== Academic members ==
Schools offering the CEMS Master's in International Management (CEMS MIM):

Country/Region	School	City
Japan	Keio University	Tokyo
South Korea	Korea University Business School	Seoul
China	Tsinghua University School of Economics and Management	Beijing
Hong Kong	HKUST Business School	Hong Kong
Singapore	National University of Singapore	Singapore
India	Indian Institute of Management Calcutta	Kolkata
Turkey	Koç University	Istanbul
Australia	University of Sydney Business School	Sydney
Poland	SGH Warsaw School of Economics	Warsaw
Czech Republic	Prague University of Economics and Business	Prague
Hungary	Corvinus University of Budapest	Budapest
Finland	Aalto University School of Business	Helsinki
Sweden	Stockholm School of Economics	Stockholm
Norway	Norwegian School of Economics	Bergen
Denmark	Copenhagen Business School	Frederiksberg
Netherlands	Rotterdam School of Management, Erasmus University	Rotterdam
Germany	University of Cologne	Cologne
Belgium	Louvain School of Management, UCLouvain	Louvain-la-Neuve
Austria	Vienna University of Economics and Business	Vienna
Switzerland	University of St. Gallen	St. Gallen
Italy	Bocconi University	Milan
France	HEC Paris	Jouy-en-Josas
Spain	ESADE Business School	Barcelona
Portugal	Nova School of Business and Economics	Lisbon
United Kingdom	London School of Economics	London
Ireland	Michael Smurfit Graduate Business School	Dublin
Egypt	The American University in Cairo	Cairo
South Africa	University of Cape Town Graduate School of Business	Cape Town
Canada	Ivey Business School	London
United States	Cornell University	Ithaca
Colombia	University of the Andes	Bogotá
Brazil	Escola de Administração de Empresas de São Paulo	São Paulo
Chile	Universidad Adolfo Ibáñez	Santiago

=== Suspended ===
Country/Region	School	City
Russia	Saint Petersburg State University Graduate School of Management	Saint Petersburg

== Corporate partners ==
Nearly 70 corporate partners contribute financially on an annual basis and provide the programme with human resources and input into the curriculum itself in each country they are based. (Note: Two Japanese corporations are the CEMS company partners supporting Keio University, from among 70 registered CEMS CPs as multinational companies. They are the Kōwa Co., Ltd. and the Nomura Securities Co., Ltd.)

Students are advised to arrange by themselves an internship partner which will accept the student intern for at least ten consecutive weeks. There are student visa requirements that each student takes responsibility to abide by, and the regulation varies by each local government.

== Social partners ==
The first CEMS social partners joined the organisation in December 2010. These are the first in a series of non-profits and NGOs that contribute to the alliance in a way identical to corporate partners (selection and admission of students, governance, curriculum delivery, proposal of internships and employment opportunities). This new initiative is part of a major sustainability drive from within CEMS. In the same vein, CEMS has also signed the PRME (Principles for Responsible Management Education) declaration.

== Alumni association ==
The CEMS Alumni Association (CAA), founded in 1993 by CEMS graduates, is an international network of CEMS graduates throughout the world. To date, there are nearly 16,000 CEMS alumni. The Graduation Ceremony takes place each year during the CEMS Annual Events (usually at the end of November) which is hosted by one of the CEMS member schools.

The CAA is led by an alumni board and is present in many countries through local committees of CEMS alumni. The local committees are responsible for keeping in contact with CEMS alumni and organizing professional and social activities. They meet regularly to discuss the activities and development of the association. The alumni board comprises the CAA President, the CEMS Executive Director, a representative of the CEMS Student Board, a representative of CEMS member schools, three local committee representatives, two senior alumni and two junior alumni. It proposes and develops initiatives to foster career and personal development opportunities for its alumni members and represents alumni interests on the CEMS Executive Board.

While students stay at partner universities, there are support groups called CEMS clubs through which CEMS students share their identities. The extended network of CEMS students spans schools across the world.
