= Tuula Teeri =

Finnish molecular geneticist

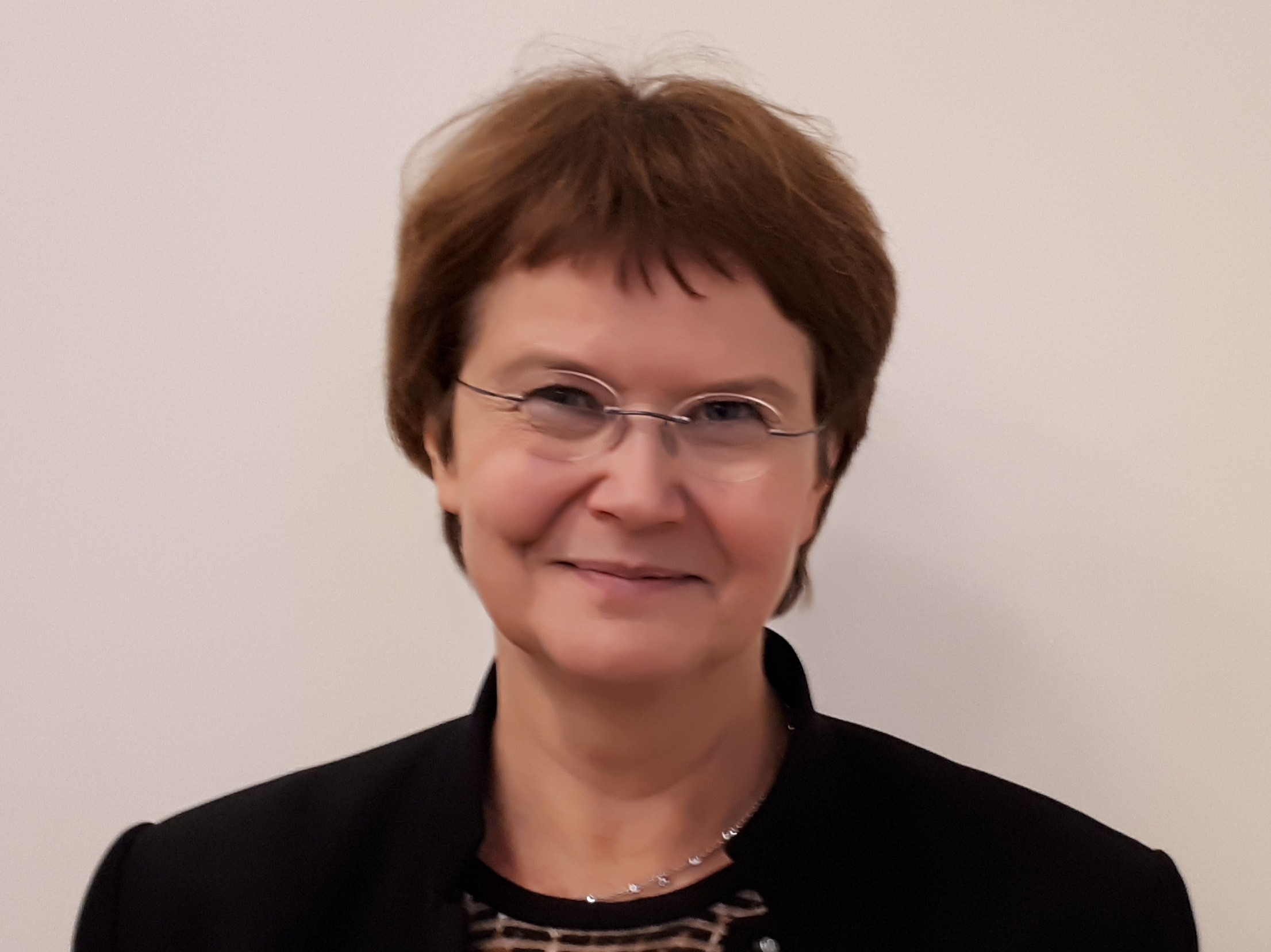
- Teeri in 2017
- Born: 1957 (age 68–69)
- Occupation: geneticist

Tuula Teeri (born 1957) is a Finnish molecular geneticist and the President of the Royal Swedish Academy of Engineering Sciences (IVA). She has previously been a Vice President at the Royal Institute of Technology (KTH) in Stockholm and President of Aalto University from April 1, 2009 to 2017. Professor Teeri started as the President of IVA on November 1, 2017

She holds a Ph.D. from the University of Helsinki (1987) and was elected a member of the Royal Swedish Academy of Sciences in 2004.
