= Aalto University =

Public university in Espoo, Finland

- Aalto-yliopisto; Aalto-universitetet
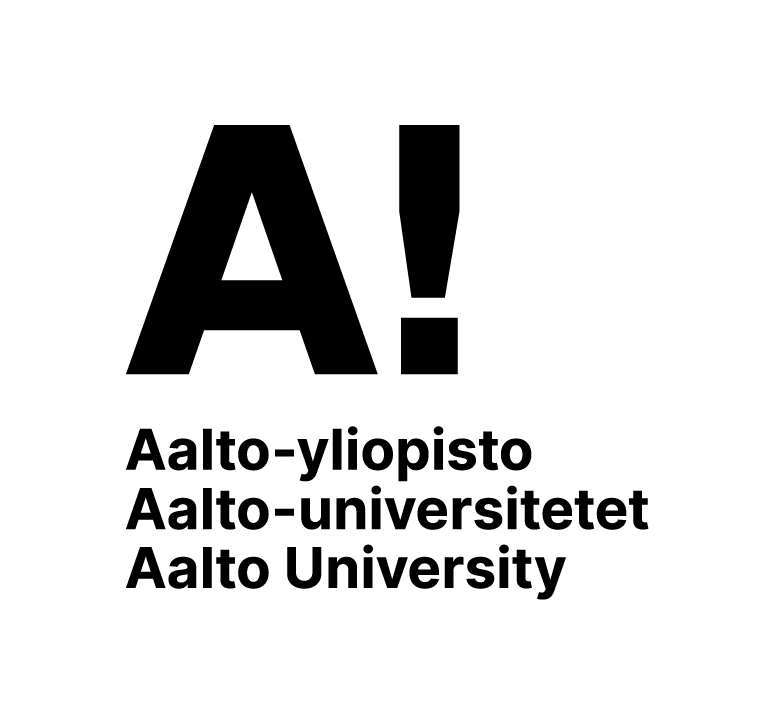
- Type: Public university
- Established: 2010; 16 years ago
- Affiliations: CLUSTER, UArctic, CESAER, AACSB, AMBA, EQUIS, CEMS, UNITE!
- Endowment: €1475 million (2024)
- Budget: Approx. €450 million per year (2024)
- Chairman: Tero Ojanperä
- President: Ilkka Niemelä
- Provost: Kristiina Mäkelä
- Academic staff: 3442 of which 413 are professors
- Administrative staff: 1442 (2023)
- Total staff: 4884 (2023)
- Students: 17,235 (2023)
- Undergraduates: 7475 (2023)
- Postgraduates: 6466 (2023)
- Doctoral students: 3294 (2023)
- Location: Otaniemi, Espoo, Töölö, Mikkeli, Metsähovi, Finland (Note: Although primarily located in Otaniemi, Espoo, Aalto University also has a presence in the cities of Helsinki, Mikkeli and Kirkkonummi.); 60°11′10″N 24°49′43″E
- Campus: Urban
- Colors: Blue, yellow, and red
- Website: aalto.fi

Aalto University (Finnish: Aalto-yliopisto; Swedish: Aalto-universitetet) is a public research university located in Espoo, Finland. It was established in 2010 as a merger of three major Finnish universities: the Helsinki University of Technology, the Helsinki School of Economics and the University of Art and Design Helsinki. The close collaboration between the scientific, business and arts communities is intended to foster multi-disciplinary education and research.

The Finnish government, in 2010, set out to create a university that fosters innovation, merging the three institutions into one. The university is composed of six schools with close to 17,000 students and 4,000 staff members, making it Finland's second largest university. The main campus of Aalto University is located in Otaniemi, Espoo. Aalto University Executive Education and Professional Development also operates in Otaniemi. In addition to the Helsinki metropolitan area, the university also operates its Bachelor's Programme in International Business in Mikkeli and the Metsähovi Radio Observatory in Kirkkonummi.

The university is named in honour of Alvar Aalto, a prominent Finnish architect, designer and alumnus of the former Helsinki University of Technology, who was also instrumental in designing a large part of the university's main campus in Otaniemi.

== History ==
In 2004, a workgroup led by Anne Brunila of the Finnish Ministry of Finance concluded that Finland had too many universities and other institutes of tertiary education which should be consolidated. Following this, Yrjö Sotamaa, president of the University of Art and Design Helsinki at the time, proposed the merger of Aalto University's founding schools in his president's opening speech in 2005. Sotamaa's line of reasoning was that this move would create a unique interdisciplinary university that was needed to create new innovative thought.

The idea received attention within the Finnish Ministry of Education, which appointed Raimo Sailas, a leading official at the Ministry of Finance, to investigate the possibility of a merger. After Sailas' group reported that it considered the merger to be beneficial to the Finnish academic world and economy, the Finnish government decided to go on with the project on 11 November 2007.

On 29 May 2008 the government announced that the new university would be named after the Finnish architect Alvar Aalto in honor of his achievements in technology, economics and art. The Finnish minister of education at the time, Sari Sarkomaa, together with representatives of Finnish industries and professional organisations, signed the Aalto University charter on 25 June 2008 in Helsinki. On 19 December 2008 Tuula Teeri was selected by the board to be the first president of Aalto University.

Aalto University started operating on 1 January 2010. During the establishment of the university, Finland's university law was revised to permit the institution to collect endowments. The university managed to reach its goal of collecting 200 million euros in private donations. The sum was augmented by 2.5 times by the Finnish state.

In a 2017 analysis by The Times Higher Education, Aalto University ranked 55th among technology challenger universities.

=== Helsinki University of Technology ===
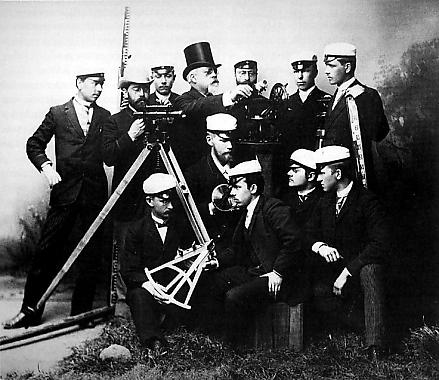
Surveying students with professor in the early days of the university of technology.

As the Aalto University was founded the four schools of science and engineering were formed out of the departments of the Helsinki University of Technology (TKK), founded in 1849 by Grand Duke Nicholas I. It received university status in 1908. In 1966, the University of Technology moved from Hietalahti in downtown Helsinki to its current Otaniemi campus, designed by Alvar Aalto. At the time of creation of Aalto University, TKK had about 250 professors and approximately 15,000 students. This means the largest part of the Aalto University is formed from the former Helsinki University of Technology.

In 2011, the former University of Technology (then known as Aalto University School of Science and Technology) was split up into four schools, corresponding to the former TKK faculties: School of Chemical Technology (CHEM), School of Electrical Engineering (ELEC), School of Engineering (ENG), and School of Science and Technology (SCI).

=== Helsinki School of Economics ===
The Helsinki School of Economics (HSE) was established in Helsinki in 1904 by the business community and was given the status of a university in 1911. It operated as a private university until 1974, when the state of Finland was given the financial responsibility of the university.

Following the merger, the university was briefly renamed Aalto University School of Economics, and is currently known as Aalto University School of Business (Aalto BIZ).

=== University of Art and Design Helsinki ===
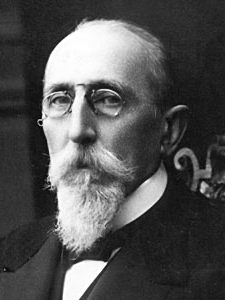
Leo Mechelin served as one of the first presidents of the school of art and design.

The University of Art and Design Helsinki has been the largest art university in the Nordic countries. It was founded in 1871. Media Centre Lume – the National Research and Development Center of audiovisual media – is also located in the university. The university awarded the following academic degrees: Bachelor of Arts, Master of Arts, and Doctor of Arts.

The university has been active in establishing research projects and industrial collaborations via the private sector. During the rectorship of Yrjö Sotamaa the university was active in integrating design into Finnish innovation networks.

Following the merger, the university was briefly renamed Aalto University School of Art and Design. In 2012, the Department of Architecture, which historically has been a part of the Helsinki University of Technology, was moved to the school, and the name was changed to Aalto University School of Art, Design and Architecture (Aalto ARTS).

The department of photography at Aalto University School of Art, Design and Architecture (Aalto ARTS) is home to what is known as The Helsinki School, a selected group of photographers from Aalto University School of Arts, Design and Architecture that has been the model for a new approach to education as well as a vehicle for collaborative thought and cooperation.

== Administration and organisation ==
=== Governance ===
The university, which is incorporated as Aalto University Foundation, is governed by the seven-member Aalto University Foundation Board. The board decides on the foundation's strategy, operation and financial issues, is responsible for any far-reaching plans and appoints the university president and vice rectors. Formerly working as the provost of Aalto University, Ilkka Niemelä was elected president of Aalto University in 2017. The first president of Aalto University was Tuula Teeri. The university is organized into six schools with their respective deans and administrative structures.

=== Schools ===
The university is organized since the beginning of 2011 into six schools formed out of the three merged universities. Each school has several departments and separate laboratories as well as a number of separate research and other units.

- School of Arts, Design and Architecture (Aalto ARTS)
- School of Chemical Engineering (Aalto CHEM)
- School of Business (Aalto BIZ)
- School of Electrical Engineering (Aalto ELEC)
- School of Engineering (Aalto ENG)
- School of Science and Technology (Aalto SCI)

=== Other units and institutes ===
- Aaltoes (Aalto Entrepreneurship Society), student-run entrepreneurship community
- Aalto University Learning Centre
- Aalto University Executive Education
- Factories – interdisciplinary collaboration networks:
  - Design Factory
  - Media Factory
- Aalto Science Institute – interdisciplinary research initiative
- Helsinki Institute for Information Technology (joint research unit with University of Helsinki)
- Helsinki Institute of Physics (operated jointly with University of Helsinki, University of Jyväskylä, Lappeenranta University of Technology and Tampere University of Technology)
- Metsähovi Radio Observatory as part of Aalto ELEC.

== Academics ==
University rankings

Global – Overall
- ARWU World: 401–500 (2024)
- QS World: 113 (2025)
- THE World: =196 (2025)
- USNWR Global: =296 (2025)

=== Studies ===
==== Study in Science and Technology ====
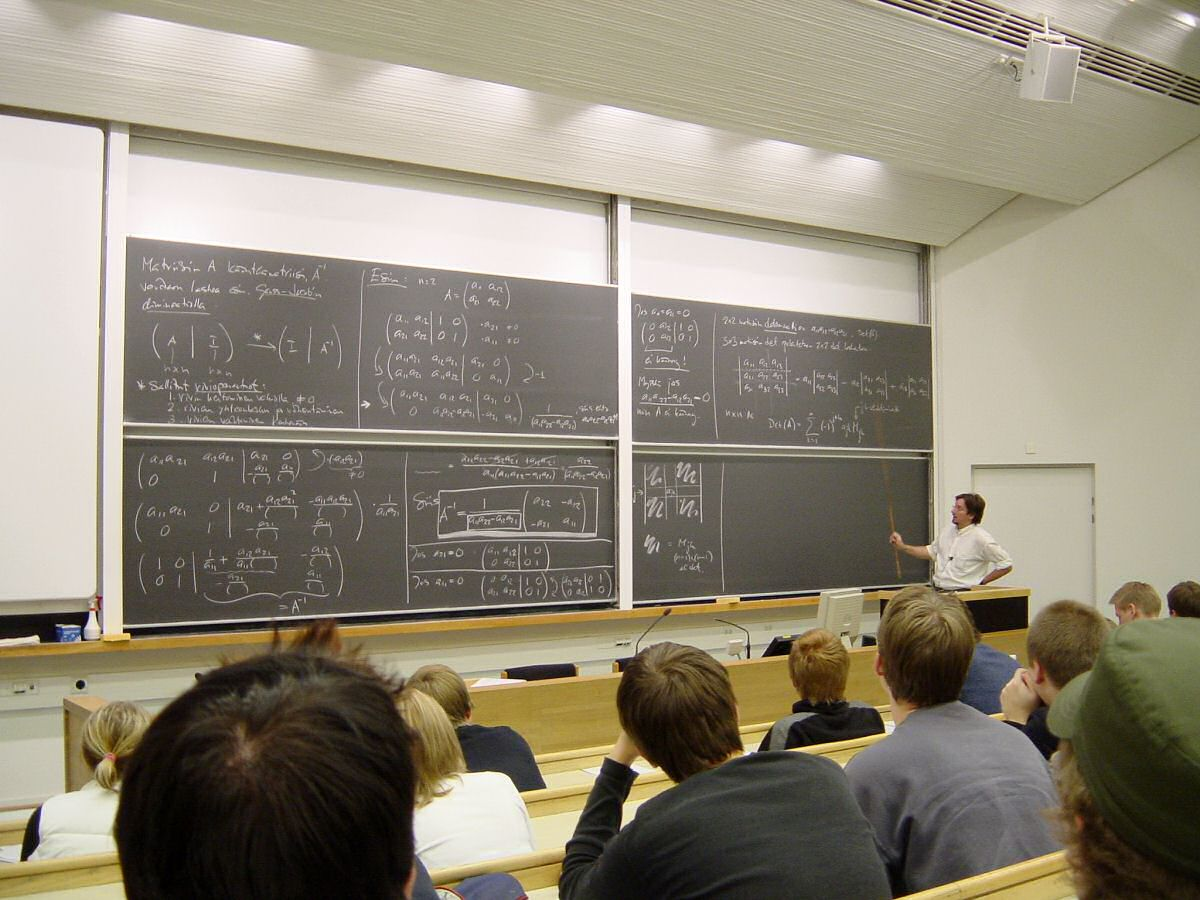
A lecture of mathematics for undergraduates inside the main building.

All engineering programmes offered by the schools of science and technology lead to the degree of diplomi-insinööri (M.Sc. (Tech.), Master of Science in Technology), a five-year taught master's degree, which is fairly similar to the German Diplom-Ingenieur degrees. From 2005, according to the Bologna process, all students must also complete a bachelor's degree (B.Sc. (Tech), Bachelor of Science in Technology), in Finnish tekniikan kandidaatti or TkK, before the DI or architect's degree. However, the schools of science and technology do not offer programs terminating in a bachelor's degree; a student may only be accepted to study for the Master's level degree. The schools of science and technology require a bachelor's degree from foreign students studying in English, because only Master's studies are offered completely in English.

Undergraduate studies are generally quite similar in between different programs with a considerable part being taken by a tuition of a solid base in mathematics and physics.

Apart from numerous programs in Finnish/Swedish, various international Master's programs are offered exclusively for studies in English. The postgraduate degrees given are tekniikan lisensiaatti (Lic.Sc. (Tech.), Licenciate of Science in Technology) and tekniikan tohtori (D.Sc. (Tech.), Doctor of Science in Technology).

Finnish students are accepted mainly on the basis of result in the national DIA entrance exam. The exam variant taken by most entrants mainly tests quantitative ability in mathematics, physics and chemistry, but specialized tests are available for students applying to a number of programs. The score required for entry to the Aalto University varies much depending on the intended field of study, however, in general the scores required for the Aalto University are higher than for any other university granting entry through the DIA exam. For example, the mean sum of mathematics and physics DIA exam scores was 7.2 in the year 2010, whereas the mean minimum sum of mathematics and physics exam scores for gaining admission to an Aalto program was 17.1–20.1, depending on the priority point distribution. Aalto also contains five of the most selective programs with respect to the matriculation exam scores, out of approximately total of 50 university technology programs in the nation, of which approximately 30 are outside of Aalto, and the three most selective programs with respect to entrance exam and combined scores. The minimum scores required for these top programs are in the 95th–99th percentile range of the whole applicant pool, and approximately 98th-99.8th percentile of what would be the score distribution of the whole age group.

==== Study in Arts, Design and Architecture ====
The School of Arts, Design and Architecture has been a leader in art and design education in Finland for over 138 years. It is an international postgraduate university institution with students from over 50 countries. It offers doctorate, master and bachelor's degrees in a wide range of disciplines – fine art, design, new media, art education, visual culture, motion picture and production design. School of Arts, Design and Architecture is a pioneer in research and in developing interdisciplinary study programmes.

The school received its current name in the beginning of 2012 when the architecture department moved in from the School of Engineering (previously part of Helsinki University of Technology). The architecture programmes lead to the Master of Science degrees in architecture and landscape architecture.

In 2021, Aalto University was ranked the sixth globally according to the QS World University Rankings by the subject Art and Design. The school maintained this position in the QS World University Rankings by Subject published in March 2023, once again placing sixth globally in art and design. In the same ranking, Aalto University was also placed 48th in architecture and the built environment.

==== Study in Business ====
The School of Business offers degrees in economics and business administration at the Bachelor, Master, Licentiate and Doctoral levels, along with MBA programs targeted to business professionals. Many of the degrees and programs are offered in English.

In its degree programs, the school has a two-step program structure with a three-year bachelor's degree followed by a two-year master's degree. A doctoral degree normally takes four additional years. Financial Times ranked Aalto University School of Business 29th in the European Business school rankings in 2013.

Aalto University School of Business is located at the Otaniemi campus. The school offers two Bachelor of Science Programs (one in Finnish at the Otaniemi campus and the other one in English at the Mikkeli campus) and 13 Master of Science Programs (12 are offered in English).

===== MBA programs =====
Aalto MBA and Executive MBA Programs are NOT Master's degree programs. Both are organized by Aalto University Executive Education Ltd. MBA and Executive MBA programs are offered in Helsinki, China, Singapore, South Korea, Taiwan and Poland and have tuition fees, unlike the degree programs. The MBA program is taught through two-week modules by visiting faculty from some of the top business schools in the world, including Emory University, Rutgers Business School – Newark and New Brunswick, University of South Carolina, Georgetown University, UCLA, Concordia University, Queen's University, Rotterdam School of Management, Indiana University, ESADE and INSEAD. Aalto University Executive Education Ltd also offers a double degree Executive MBA Program in partnership with ESADE Business School. Financial Times ranked Aalto University School of Business 78th in Global MBA programs, 85th in Executive MBA programs.

Aalto EMBA was advertised as a master's degree program in Taiwan, even though it's a non-degree program. Recruiting and hosting of the program infringed local laws. The issues were discovered in 2022 and the program was closed as a result.

=== Research ===
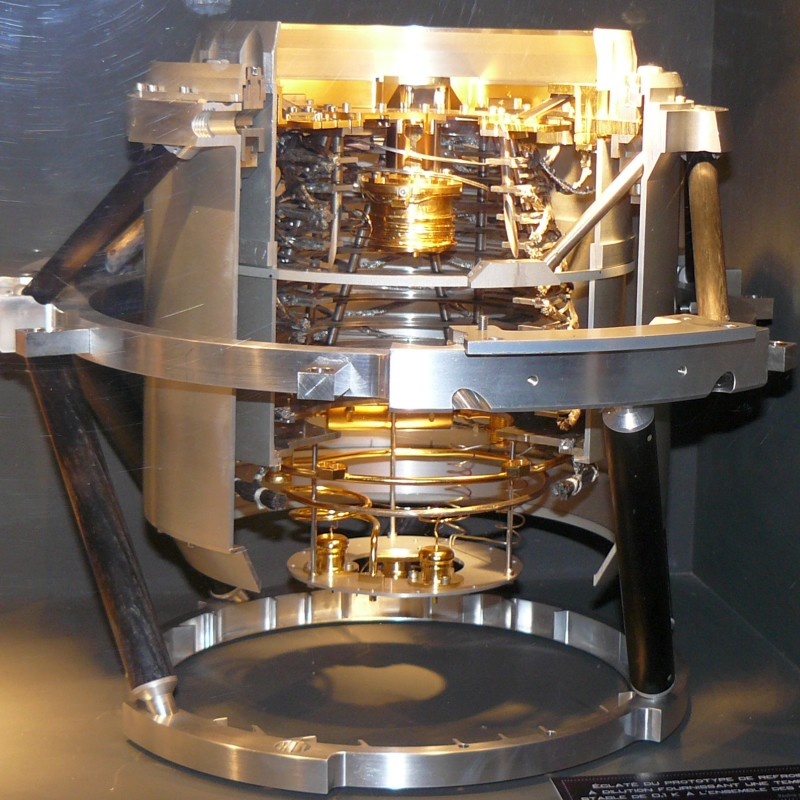
Radio science done with the receiver in the Planck probe reveals the age and composition of the universe.

Aalto University has defined four fundamental competence areas: ICT and digitalisation, Materials and sustainable use of natural resources, Global business dynamics and Art and design knowledge building. In addition to these, the university invests in three integrative multidisciplinary themes: Advanced energy solutions, Health and wellbeing, and Human-centred living environments.

Researchers at Aalto University have achieved notability in, among other things, low temperature physics (holding the current world record for the lowest temperature achieved), the development of devices and methods for magnetoencephalography, mobile communications, wood processing, and neural networks, with professor Teuvo Kohonen initiating research in self-organizing maps. Additionally, the first commercialised total synthesis, the synthesis of camphor, was invented by Gustaf Komppa, the first professor of chemistry at TKK and the Nobel laureate (chemistry, 1945) Artturi Virtanen held a professorship in biochemistry at TKK. More recently, the university has notably invested in the research of nanotechnology, operating the largest cleanroom facility in Northern Europe and one of the largest microscopy clusters in Europe. MilliLab, a joint laboratory of VTT and Aalto University, built one of the radio receivers in the Planck probe, which maps the cosmic microwave background for determining the age and composition of the universe.

=== Centres of Excellence ===
Aalto University has participated in nine centres of excellence during 2008–2019 (Finnish: huippuyksikkö), selected by the Academy of Finland to represent the top research in the country, and receiving separate, fixed-period funding from the academy.

- Centre of Excellence in Generic Intelligent Machines Research
- Centre of Excellence in Smart Radios and Wireless Research
- Centre of Excellence in Computational Nanoscience
- Centre of Excellence in Computational Inference
- Centre of Excellence in Laser Scanning Research
- Centre of Excellence in Low Temperature Quantum Phenomena and Devices
- Centre of Excellence in Molecular Engineering of Biosynthetic Hybrid Materials
- Centre of Excellence in Molecular Systems Immunology and Physiology, together with University of Helsinki and University of Turku
- Centre of Excellence in Research on Solar Long-Term Variability and Effects, together with University of Oulu and Finnish Meteorological Institute

Aalto University participates in three Centre of Excellences (2018–2025):

- Centre of Excellence in Quantum Technology
- Centre of Excellence of Inverse modelling and Imaging, together with University of Helsinki
- Centre of Excellence in Research of Sustainable Space, together with Finnish Meteorological Institute

=== Network Memberships ===
- BALTECH
- Conference of European Schools for Advanced Engineering Education and Research (CESAER)
- Consortium Linking Universities of Science and Technology for Education and Research (CLUSTER)
- Cumulus
- Global Education for European Engineers and Entrepreneurs (GE4)
- The European Association for the Transfer of Technologies, Innovation and Industrial Information (TII)
- T.I.M.E. Association (TIME)
- ProTon Europe, the European Knowledge Transfer Association
- Partnership in International Management (PIM)
- European Society for Engineering Education (SEFI)
- European Council of Landscape Architecture Schools (ECLAS)
- European Association for International Education (EAIE)
- Community of European Management Schools and International Companies (CEMS)
- The European Association for University Lifelong Learning (EUCEN)
- University Consortium of Pori
- University Network for Innovation, Technology and Engineering (UNITE!)

== Campuses ==
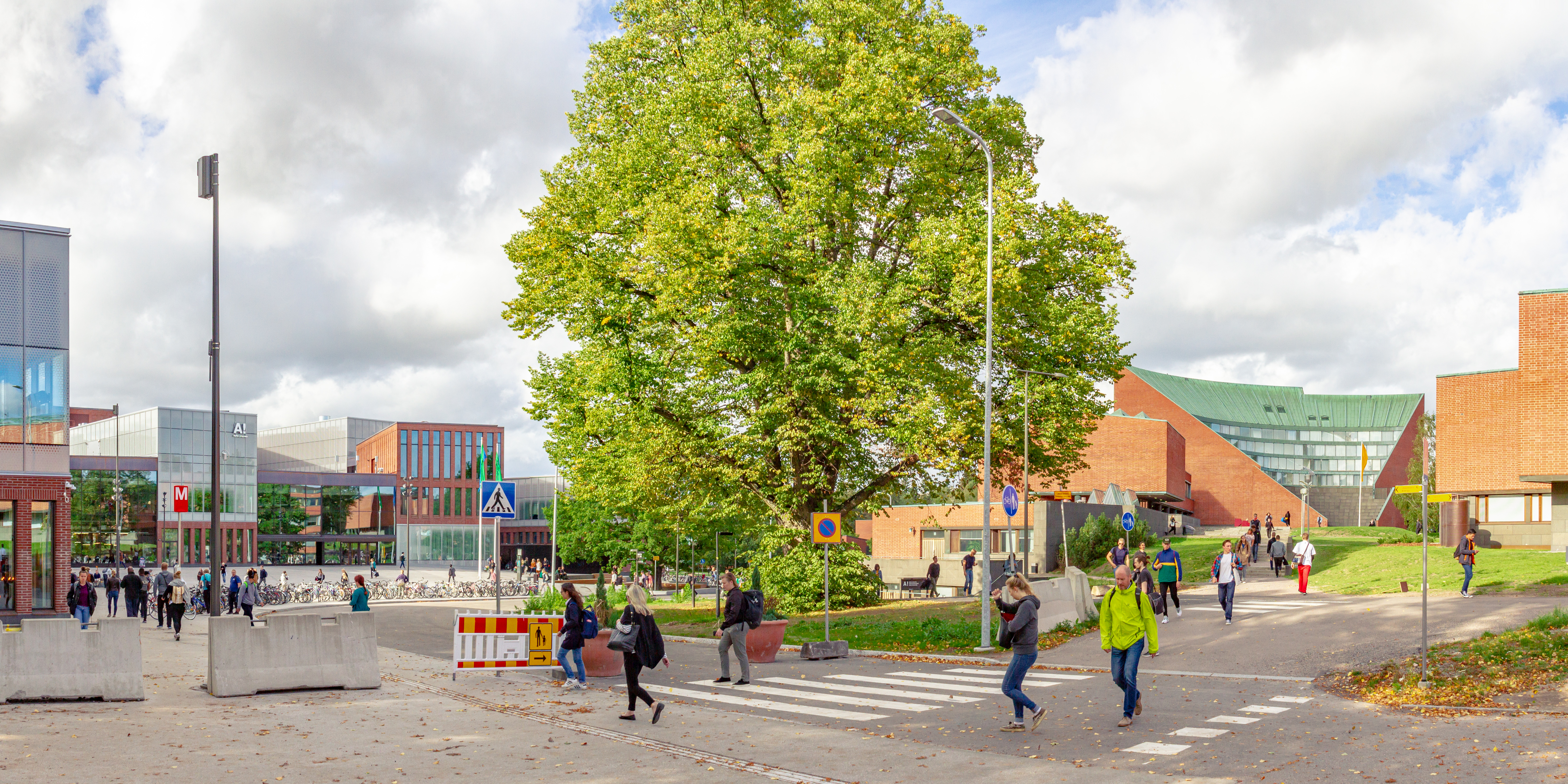
Otaniemi campus after the 2018 reform. On the left is the Väre building containing entrance to the metro station, a mall 'A Bloc', and premises for Aalto ARTS and Aalto BIZ. On the right former is the Undergraduate Centre, the main building of TKK designed by Alvar Aalto.

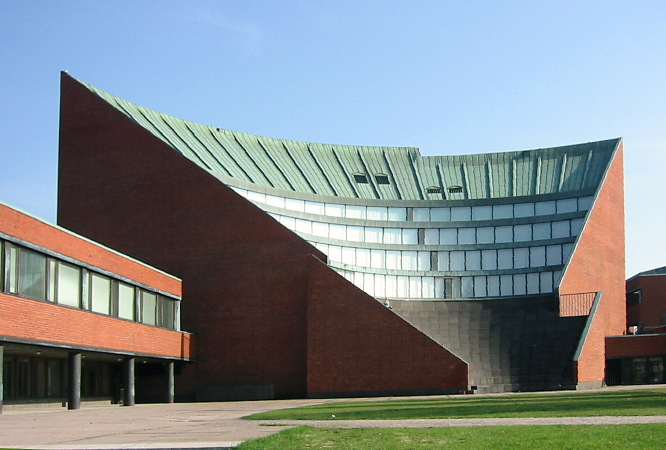
Alvar Aalto's landmark auditorium of the main building of the Otaniemi campus. The amphitheatre-like structure contains the main auditoriums, while its exterior can be used for plays and other activities.

The main university campus is located in Otaniemi, Espoo. The university also has activities in Töölö, Mikkeli and Metsähovi.

=== Otaniemi Campus ===
Since 2019, all of the Aalto University schools have been primarily located in Otaniemi, Espoo, roughly 10 km (6.2 mi) from the center of Helsinki. The original buildings of the campus were designed by Alvar Aalto. Several high-tech companies, the Finnish forest industry's joint experimental laboratory KCL, and business incubators Innopoli and Technopolis are also situated nearby. It is also directly adjacent to Keilaniemi, with the Life Science Center and the headquarters of several notable Finnish companies, such as Kone and Fortum. The Aalto University metro station connects Otaniemi to Helsinki via the Länsimetro line.

The Teekkarikylä Student Village, home to over 2,000 students, makes up the majority of residences in Otaniemi. There are over one hundred student organizations on campus, which provide a range of opportunities to take part in pastimes of various kinds, from sports to music.

=== Other locations ===
Aalto University retains ownership of the former campus of the School of Business, located in Töölö, Helsinki. As of 2019, the building is under renovation and primarily used by Aalto University Executive Education.

The School of Business also maintains a Bachelor's Programme in International Business, which is taught in Mikkeli. The university also owns and operates the Metsähovi Radio Observatory in Kirkkonummi.

== Culture and student life ==
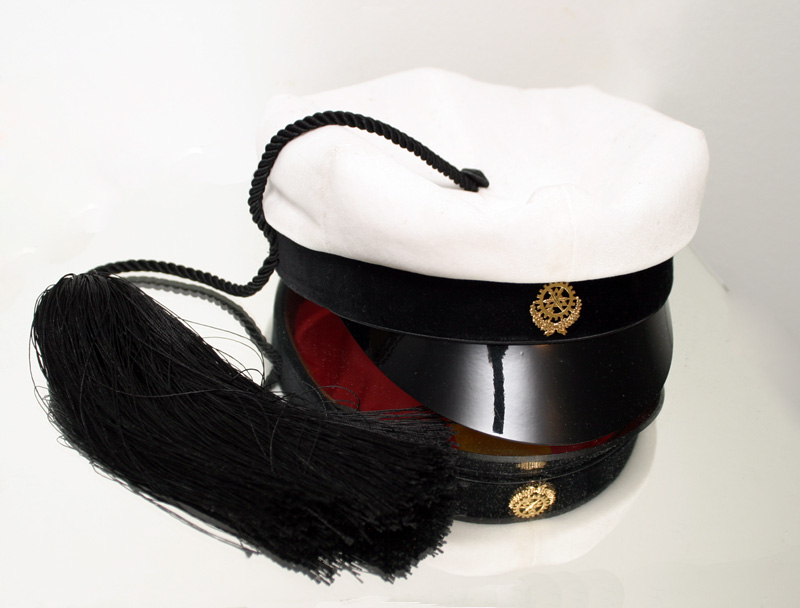
A traditional Finnish technology student's hat with a tuft (teekkarilakki) photographed on top of a mirror.

The Aalto University students are known for active student life.

An integral part of many student traditions play the brightly coloured overalls worn to many events. The colour of the overall signals what the student studies. For instance, students studying automation and robotics wear purple overalls, those studying electrical engineering wear white overalls, and chemical engineering students wear blue overalls. The student community has also organised important charity events. In fact, the name for these events tempaus, has entered common language to describe any carnival-like charity event.

The students of technology (teekkarit) are especially noticeable, as they wear a distinctive hat with a tuft on many occasions (both formal and informal). Technology students are also famous for, and Finland's leading practitioners of, student pranks (jäynä), similar in principle to MIT hacks. Their most widely publicised stunt took place in 1961, when a team of students smuggled a statue of Paavo Nurmi onto the 300-year-old wreck of Regalskeppet Vasa just days before its lifting from the bottom of the sea.

Although student traditions vary in between the different constituent schools common activities started to burgeon early after the foundation of Aalto University. The most noticeable student event of the first year of the university was Aalto on Tracks, where a group of 100 students came together to rent a private train which they traveled 10,000 km (6,200 mi) on from Helsinki to the Shanghai Expo enjoying multidisciplinary talks and workshops on the way. The event was such a success that the follow-up Aalto on waves is planned to arrange a trip by boat to South America. Aalto on Tracks also spurred students of Tongji University to arrange Tongji on Tracks which essentially takes the journey of Aalto on Tracks in the opposite direction.

Aalto Entrepreneurship Society is a multi-disciplinary society uniting students and graduates of all disciplines of the university. It aims to encourage high-tech, high-growth, scalable entrepreneurship by arranging get-togethers to spark ideas and innovations and aid start-up initiatives among the Aalto students.

=== Aalto Festival and MoA ===
Aalto Festival (2015–2019), formerly known as Masters of Aalto (2012–2014), and the Masters of Arts festival, MoA (2002–2011), and Think 2000 was an annual event in May where the newly graduated of the multidisciplinary university met the public.

An extensive exhibition showcased a wide array of works: everything from distinguished theses, individual statements, concepts and products arising from commercial collaboration to works of art. For the graduating students, the exhibition was an opportunity to interact with society, future employers, the media and other influential parties.

Aalto Festival consisted of a varying program with exhibitions, seminars, discussions, films, workshops and guided tours.

=== Student union ===
Aalto University Student Union (Finnish: Aalto-yliopiston ylioppilaskunta, Swedish: Aalto-universitetets studentkår, AYY or AUS in short) is the student union of Aalto University. Every bachelor's and master's degree student enrolled in Aalto University is a member of the Student Union.

The purpose of AYY is to represent the students, look after their interests, and support the community of 15,000 students. AYY provides its members with a variety of services such as healthcare, recreation and housing. The student union is financed by membership fees, investments and profits from student housing.

Aalto University Student Union was formed in the beginning of 2010 through a merger between the respective student unions of the merged universities.

The Aalto University is also one of the two universities in Finland to host one or more nations, a Finnish type of student corporation. Aalto's only nation is Teknologföreningen (TF) and its goal is to unite Swedish-speaking students at university. The nation is housed in its peculiar building called Urdsgjallar. Since 1972, when the corresponding Finnish-speaking nation Tekniikan Ylioppilaat was abolished, there are no nations for the Finnish-speaking students, though the 15 regional nations at the University of Helsinki, both Finnish- and Swedish-speaking, do welcome Aalto students as members.

=== Associations ===
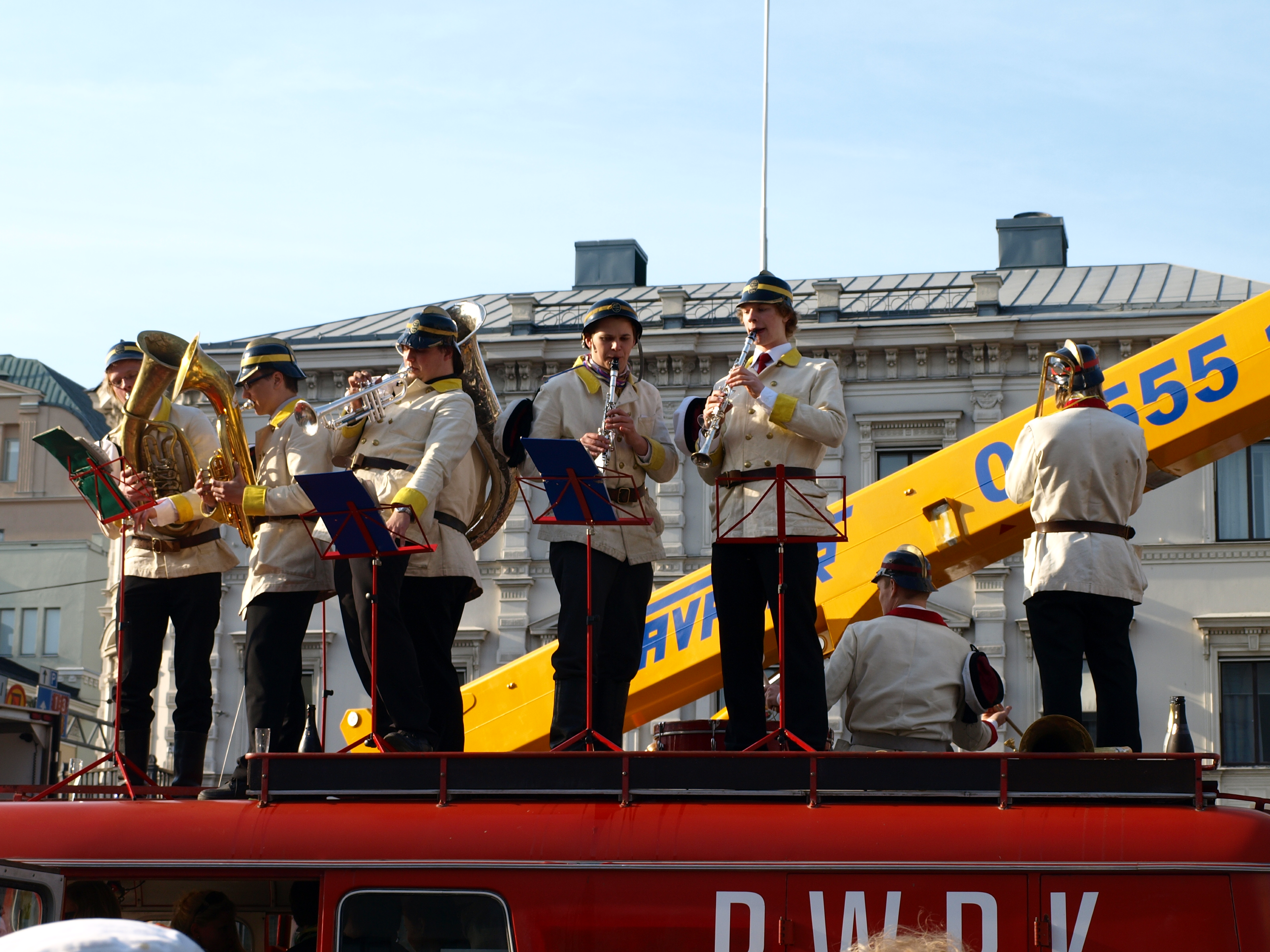
The Retuperä WBK is a student band that parodies a volunteer fire brigade brass band. In this picture Retuperä is performing in central Helsinki on top of their fire truck.

In addition to the student union, Aalto university students have formed numerous associations for studies, cultural activity and sports. There are more than 150 associations maintained by university students.

==== List of student associations ====
This list includes only the associations known to have English Wikipedia articles.

- The Polytech Choir (Finnish: Polyteknikkojen kuoro)
- Polyteknikkojen Ilmailukerho (Flying club)
- Helsinki Academic Male Choir KYL (Finnish: Kauppakorkeakoulun Ylioppilaskunnan Laulajat)
- Otaniemi Underground Broadcasting System
- Aalto University Sports Club
- Aaltoes
- Teknologföreningen
- Kauppakorkeakoulun Ylioppilaskunnan Laulajat

=== Student housing ===
The housing area of Otaniemi campus, known as Teekkarikylä (technology student village), is mostly owned by the student union and partly by HOAS (Helsinki Student Housing Fund). The housing is characterised by the presence of foreign students of many nationalities. As of 2005, the village offers housing for approximately 2,600 students.

Construction of the Otaniemi campus was started in 1950, in order for the first buildings to host the athletes of the 1952 Summer Olympics in Helsinki. Some of the building material originally used for the campus was acquired from the former Soviet Union embassy, which had been destroyed during World War II, as a result of bombings by the Soviet Union itself. The student housing has been used for housing athletes again in e.g. the 2005 World Championships in Athletics, sometimes to the dismay of the students that have to move out during the events. The quality of the Otaniemi student housing holds a high standard in international comparison.

Some student housing is also available in the vicinity of the other campuses.

The Otaniemi campus also contains the former student union building Dipoli, named as the second Poli, the successor of the first student union building in downtown Helsinki. Dipoli was designed by Reima Pietilä and Raili Pietilä and completed in 1966. In 1993, the building was permanently rented to the university to act as a conference and continuing education center and later sold due to high maintenance costs. It is regularly used for conventions, congresses and student parties.

== Notable people and famous alumni ==
All three constituent schools have played an integral part in educating many of the top names in their respective fields in Finland. After the Second World War Finland's economy grew and Finnish companies became players in the international markets requiring highly educated expertise and leadership. Both the schools of technology and economy catered to this need as the premier schools of their fields in the country. During the latter part of the 20th century the schools had to increase their student intake considerably to meet the demands of growing markets.

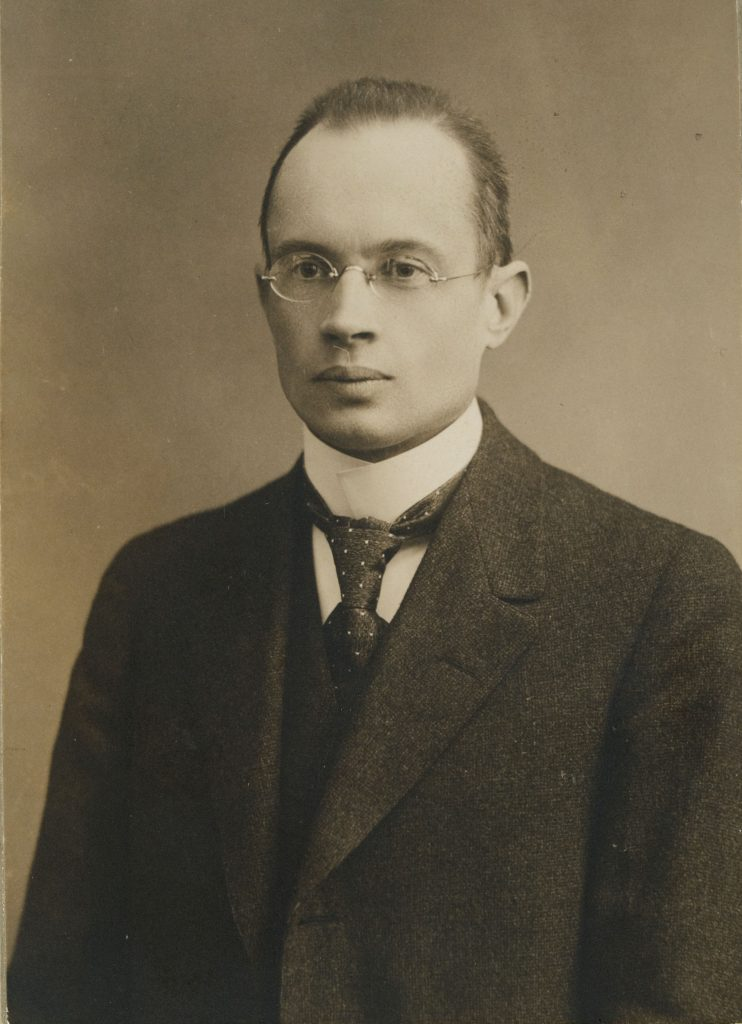
Gunnar Nordström
D.Sc.
Professor
Pioneering physicist

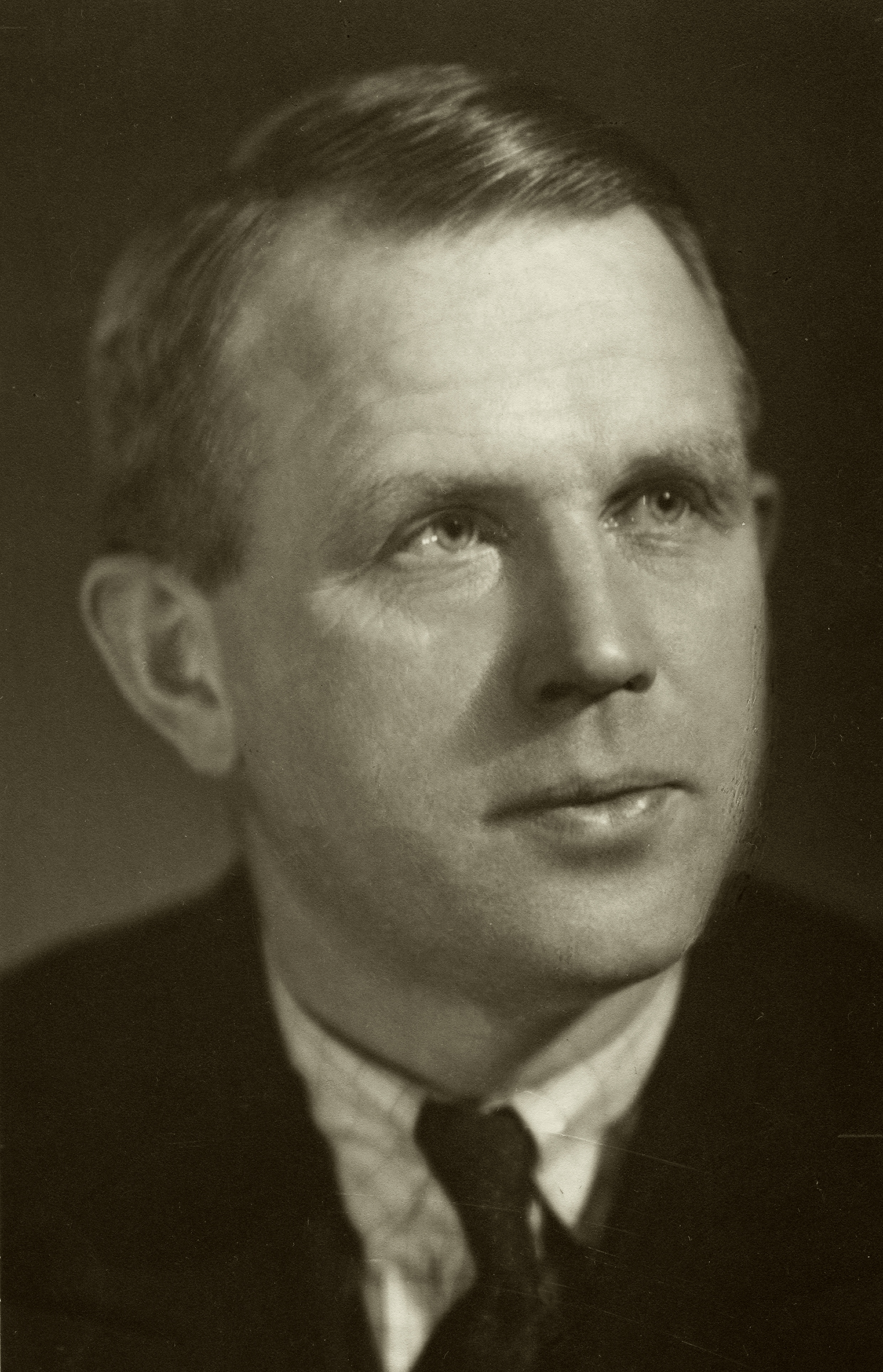
Artturi Ilmari Virtanen
D.Sc.
Professor
Nobel Laureate

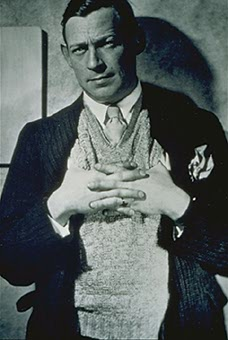
Alvar Aalto
M.Sc. (Arch.)
Architect

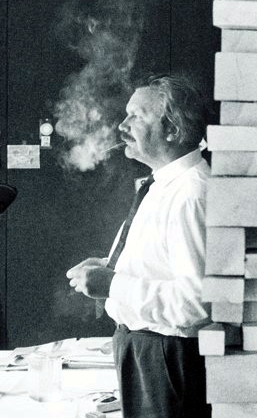
Tapio Wirkkala
Designer

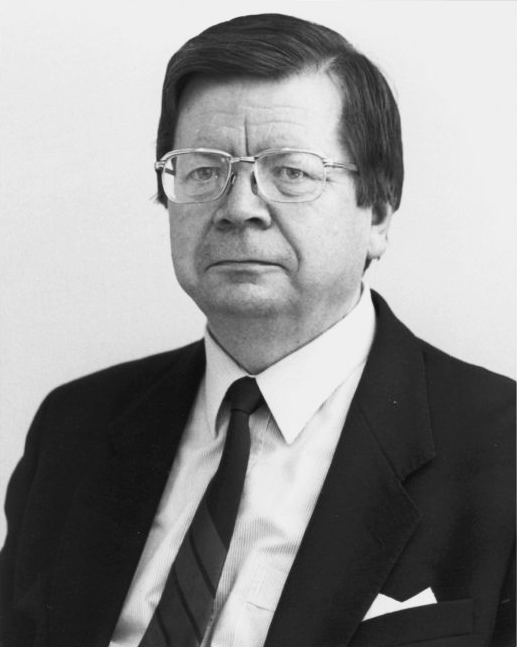
Teuvo Kohonen
D.Eng.
Professor
Neural Networks Researcher

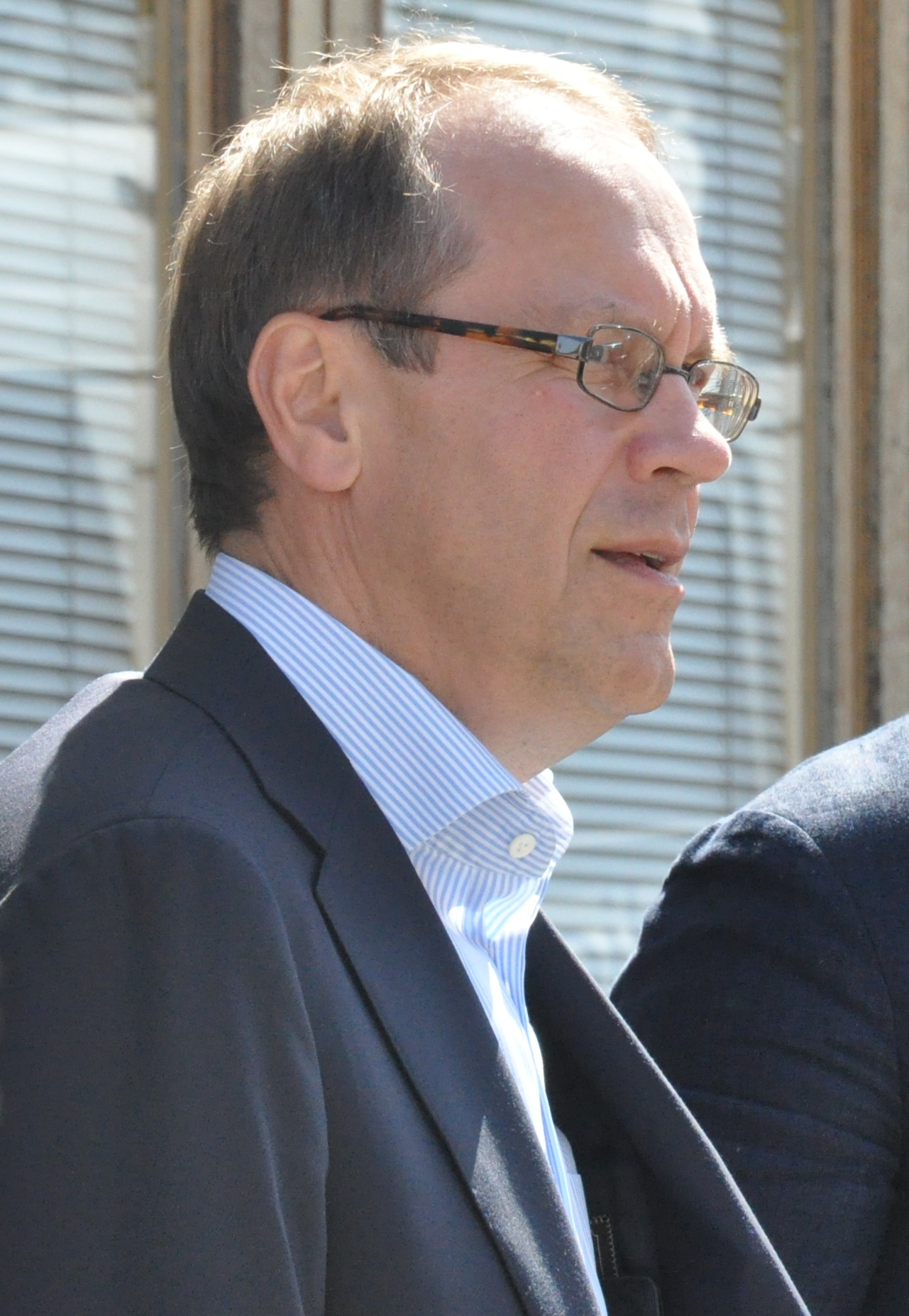
Jorma Ollila
M.Sc. (Tech.), M.Pol.Sc., M.Sc. (Econ.)
CEO of Nokia, Chairman of Royal Dutch Shell

== See also ==
- Aalto University Library
- Institute of technology
- List of universities in Finland
- Software Industry Survey
- Top Industrial Managers for Europe (TIME) network for student mobility
