= Metsähovi Radio Observatory =

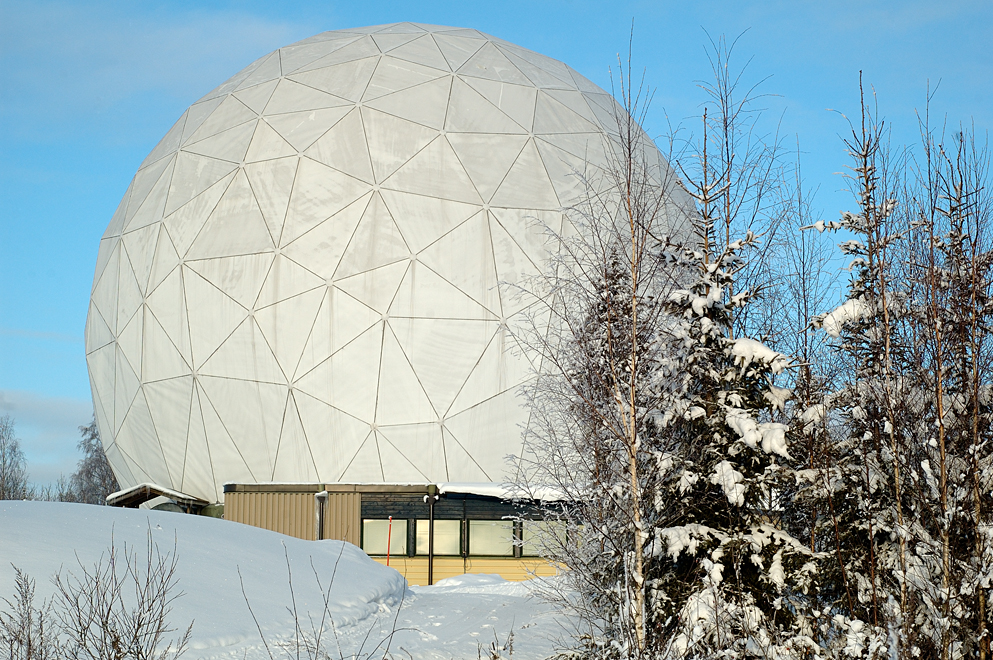
- Alternative names: Metsähovin radiotutkimusasema
- Organization: Aalto University
- Location: Kylmälä, Kirkkonummi, Western Uusimaa, Western Uusimaa
- Coordinates: 60°13′05″N 24°23′38″E
- Established: 1974
- Website: www.aalto.fi/en/metsahovi-radio-observatory
- Telescopes: Metsahovi 14m radio telescope; Metsähovi Compact Array
- Related media on Commons

The Metsähovi Radio Observatory is an astronomical observatory in Finland affiliated with Aalto University. Its main premises are in Metsähovi, Kirkkonummi, 35 kilometers west of the university's Otaniemi campus.

The observatory currently operates a 13.7 metres (45 ft) diameter radio telescope and has an array of four 5.5 metres (18 ft) dishes to serve as a compact interferometer called the 'Metsähovi Compact Array'. In addition, it operates several smaller radio telescopes and instruments. The observatory is staffed by some 20 researchers, engineers, and students from Aalto University and the Finnish Centre for Astronomy with the European Southern Observatory (ESO).

The observatory has been operational since 1974 and active in the fields of:

- fundamental research in radio astronomy
- development of instruments needed in radio astronomy
- development of methods for radio astronomical measurements
- applied scientific computing
- space research
- education

The current research focuses on variable quasars, active galaxies, solar observations, and very long baseline interferometry. Metsähovi is a member of the European VLBI Network.

The observatory observed the near-total Solar eclipse of March 20, 2015 at 11.2 and 37 GHz.

== See also ==
- List of astronomical observatories
- List of radio telescopes
