= Aalto University School of Business =

Business school in Espoo, Finland

- Aalto-yliopiston kauppakorkeakoulu Aalto-universitetets handelshögskola
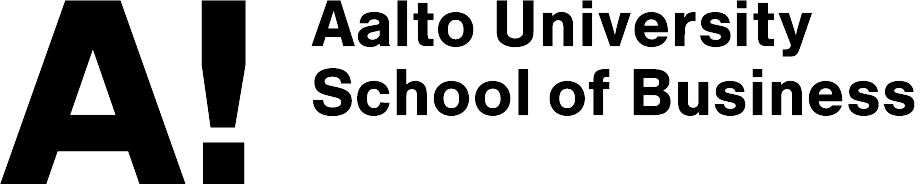
- Other name: Aalto BIZ
- Type: Business school
- Established: 1911
- Parent institution: Aalto University
- Affiliations: AACSB, AMBA, EQUIS, CEMS
- Dean: Timo Korkeamäki
- Academic staff: 73 (2013)
- Administrative staff: Over 465
- Students: 3,789 (2013)
- Other students: International students 14.4%
- Location: Espoo, Mikkeli, Finland; 60°10′19″N 024°55′22″E
- Campus: Urban, Inner City
- Website: aalto.fi/sob

The Aalto University School of Business (Finnish: Aalto-yliopiston kauppakorkeakoulu; Swedish: Aalto-universitets handelshögskola) is the largest business school in Finland. Founded in 1911, it is the second oldest business school in Finland and one of the oldest business schools in the Nordic countries. The school became part of Aalto University on 1 January 2010. It has been previously known as the Helsinki School of Economics, the Helsinki School of Economics and Business Administration, and during 2010–2012 the Aalto University School of Economics.

The Aalto University School of Business is the first business school in the Nordic countries to have received the Triple Crown accreditation (accreditations from the three largest and most influential business school accreditation organizations: AACSB, AMBA, and EQUIS).

In terms of admissions, the school is considered the most difficult business school in Finland. In 2019, the school had the highest number of applicants for any higher education program in Finland. It also had the lowest acceptance rate of any business school in the country.

== History ==
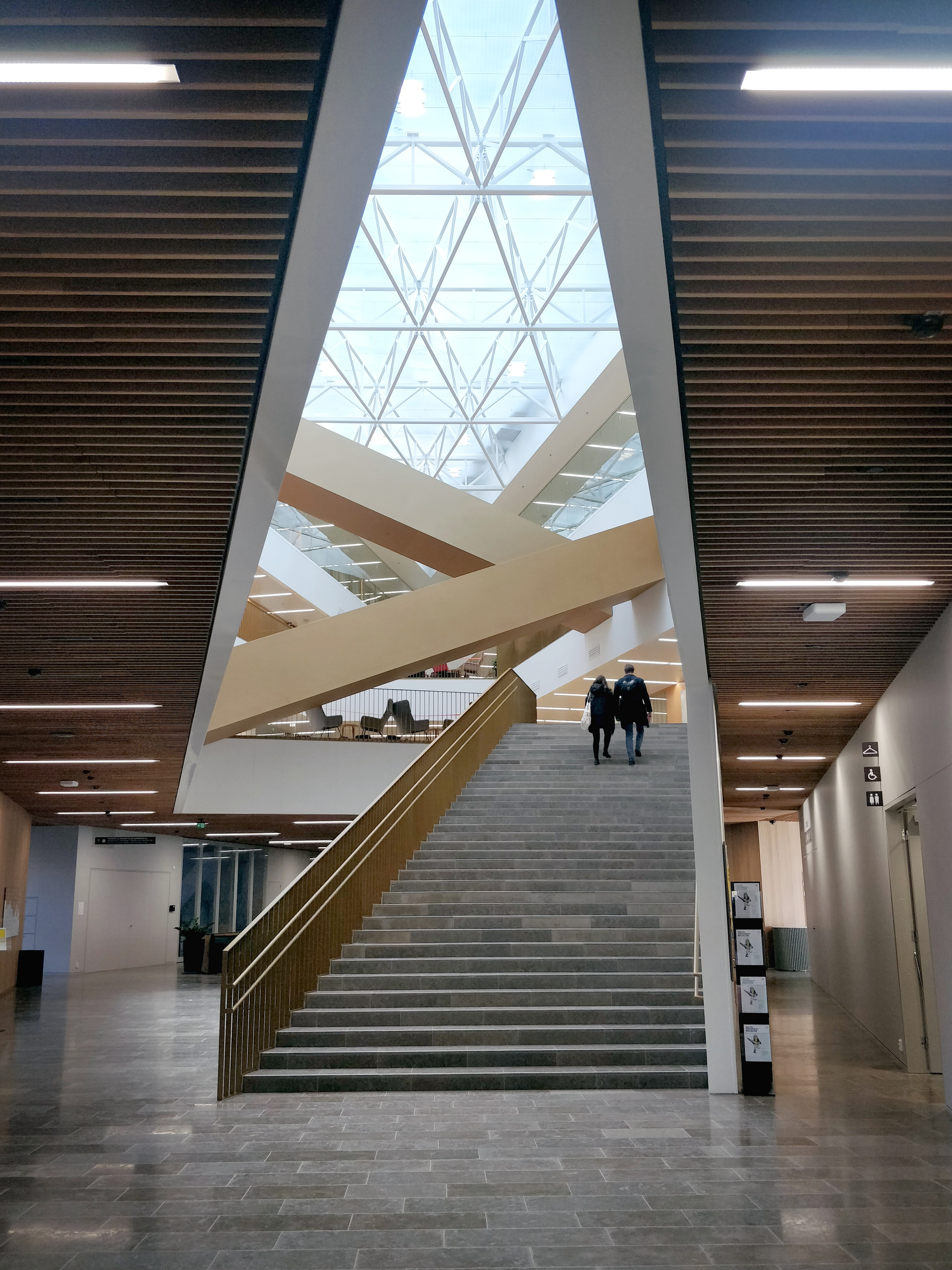
The School of Business relocated to the Otaniemi campus in 2019.

The Aalto University School of Business was established in Helsinki in 1904 by the business community and was given the status of a university in 1911. It operated as a private university until 1974 when the state of Finland was given the financial responsibility of the university. Nevertheless, the school has remained autonomous in its administration and internal affairs. Since its founding, 23,000 students have graduated. In 1950, the School of Business moved from Fabianinkatu to Runeberginkatu in Töölö. The school became a part of Aalto University on 1 January 2010 and fully transitioned to its Otaniemi campus in 2019.

== Rankings and accreditations ==
The Aalto University School of Business has been accredited by all three major international organizations that certify business schools (AACSB, AMBA, EQUIS), a triple-crown accreditation possessed by only 55 other universities in the world. The school is also a member of the CEMS (Global Alliance in Management Education) and PIM (Partnership in International Management).

Since 2005, the Financial Times has ranked the CEMS program among the top masters in management programs in the world. The Aalto University School of Business is an active member of this joint program. The Financial Times ranked the Aalto University School of Business 29th in the European business school rankings in 2013, 78th in Global MBA programs, and 43rd in Master in Management programs.

== Degrees and programmes ==
The school offers university degrees in economics and business administration at the bachelor's, master's, licentiate, and doctoral levels, along with MBA programmes targeted to business professionals hosted through Aalto University Executive Education.

The school has a two-step program structure, accordingly to the Bologna Treaty, with a three-year bachelor's degree followed by a two-year master's degree. New students start by studying towards a BSc degree in economics and business administration and on completion, are eligible to continue to study for the master's degree. A doctoral degree normally takes four additional years.

=== Bachelor's programmes ===
Since 2013, the school offers the following bachelor's programmes (3-year programme, 180 ECTS credits):

- Economics and business administration (in Otaniemi, Espoo, in Finnish and Swedish)
- Economics (in Otaniemi, in English)
- International business (in Mikkeli, in English).

In economics and business administration, students may choose one of the following as their major: Accounting, business law, economics, finance, information service and management, management, marketing

=== Master's programmes ===
The school offers the following master's programmes (2-year programme, 120 ECTS credits):

- Accounting
- Business Analytics
- Creative Sustainability
- Economics
- Finance
- Global Management
- Information and Service Management
- International Design Business Management
- Marketing
- People Management and Organizational Development
- Strategic management in changing world
- Sustainable entrepreneurship
- Yritysjuridiikka (in Finnish)

=== Summer programmes ===
Since 1995, the school has offered a multidisciplinary summer programme called the Information Technology Program (3-month programme, 24 ECTS credits). The school also offers a multidisciplinary Business Master Class summer course (2-week course, 6 ECTS credits).

== MBA programs ==
MBA and executive MBA programs are offered by the Aalto University Executive Education AEE with operations in Helsinki, China, Singapore, South Korea, Taiwan, Sweden and Iran. There is a tuition fee in the MBA program, unlike in the BSc/MSc degree programs. The MBA program is taught through two-week modules by visiting faculty from some of the best business schools in the world, including Emory University, Rutgers Business School – Newark and New Brunswick, University of South Carolina, Georgetown University, University of California, Los Angeles, Concordia University, Queen's University at Kingston, Rotterdam School of Management, Erasmus University, Indiana University, ESADE and INSEAD.

== Admissions ==
Each year, around 400 students are admitted into the bachelor's programmes and around 200 students to the master's programmes. Bachelor's admissions are based mainly on an admissions test (in Finnish) and the nationwide matriculation examination. Non-Finnish speakers and international students have the opportunity to gain admission through the SAT (Scholastic Admissions Test) conducted in English. Applicants with an appropriate bachelor's degree may apply for the master's admission to taking only the degree of Master of Science in economics and business administration.

== Partner universities ==
The Aalto University School of Business has exchange partnerships with over 150 universities on six different continents. Each year, close to 400 students go abroad on their exchange and the school welcomes over 350 incoming exchange students. The school collaborates with the leading business schools in Europe within the CEMS community. Partner schools include Imperial College London in the UK, HEC Montréal in Canada, Karlsruhe Institute of Technology and WHU – Otto Beisheim School of Management in Germany, NCCU College of Commerce in Taiwan, Yonsei University in South Korea, Peking University in China, Sophia University in Japan, Duke University, University of South Carolina in the US and Skema Business School and ESCP Business School in France. In the CEMS network, partner schools include HEC Paris in France, ESADE in Spain, the London School of Economics in the UK and the University of St. Gallen in Switzerland, among others

== CEMS Master's in international management ==
The CEMS includes 30 academic institutions from 5 continents, over 70 corporate partners and 4 social partners from around the globe.

The Aalto University School of Business has been a Finnish member of the CEMS network since 1998. Their CEMS corporate partners are Kone and Nokia.

The School of Business offers a master's programme in global management where students can obtain two qualifications: MSc in Economics and Business administration granted by the Aalto University School of Business and CEMS Master's in International Management granted by CEMS, the Global Alliance in Management Education. Most of the CEMS MIM elements are fully incorporated in the Global Management master's programme (120 ECTS).

CEMS MIM has high recognition in the corporate sector. Consistently ranked among the top in the world by the Financial Times, the CEMS MIM unites multinational companies and international-calibre professors from leading universities and business schools.

== Partnership in international management ==
The School of Business is a member of the PIM Network, which consists of 60 business schools worldwide.

== Gallery ==
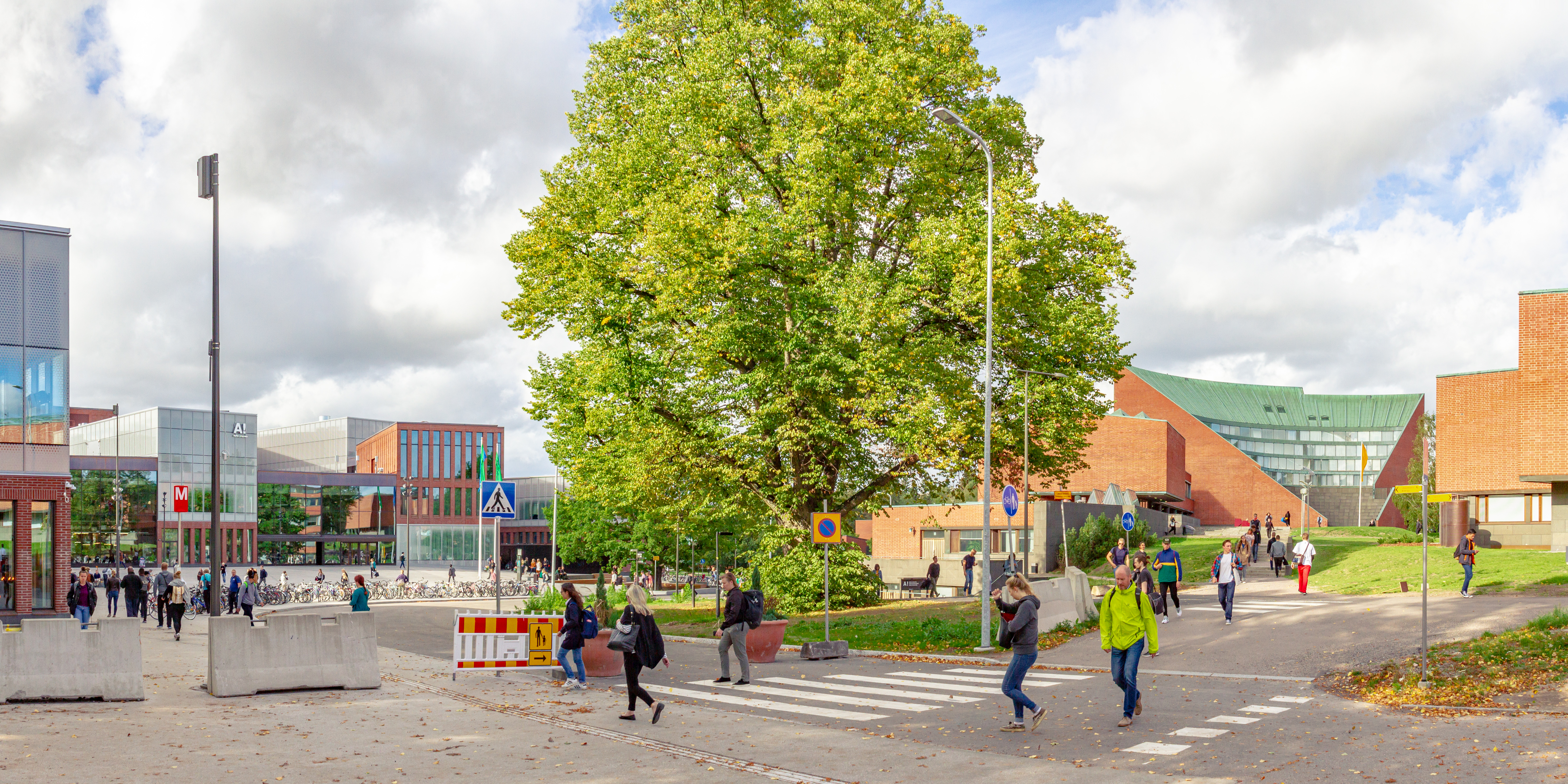
Aalto University's campus.

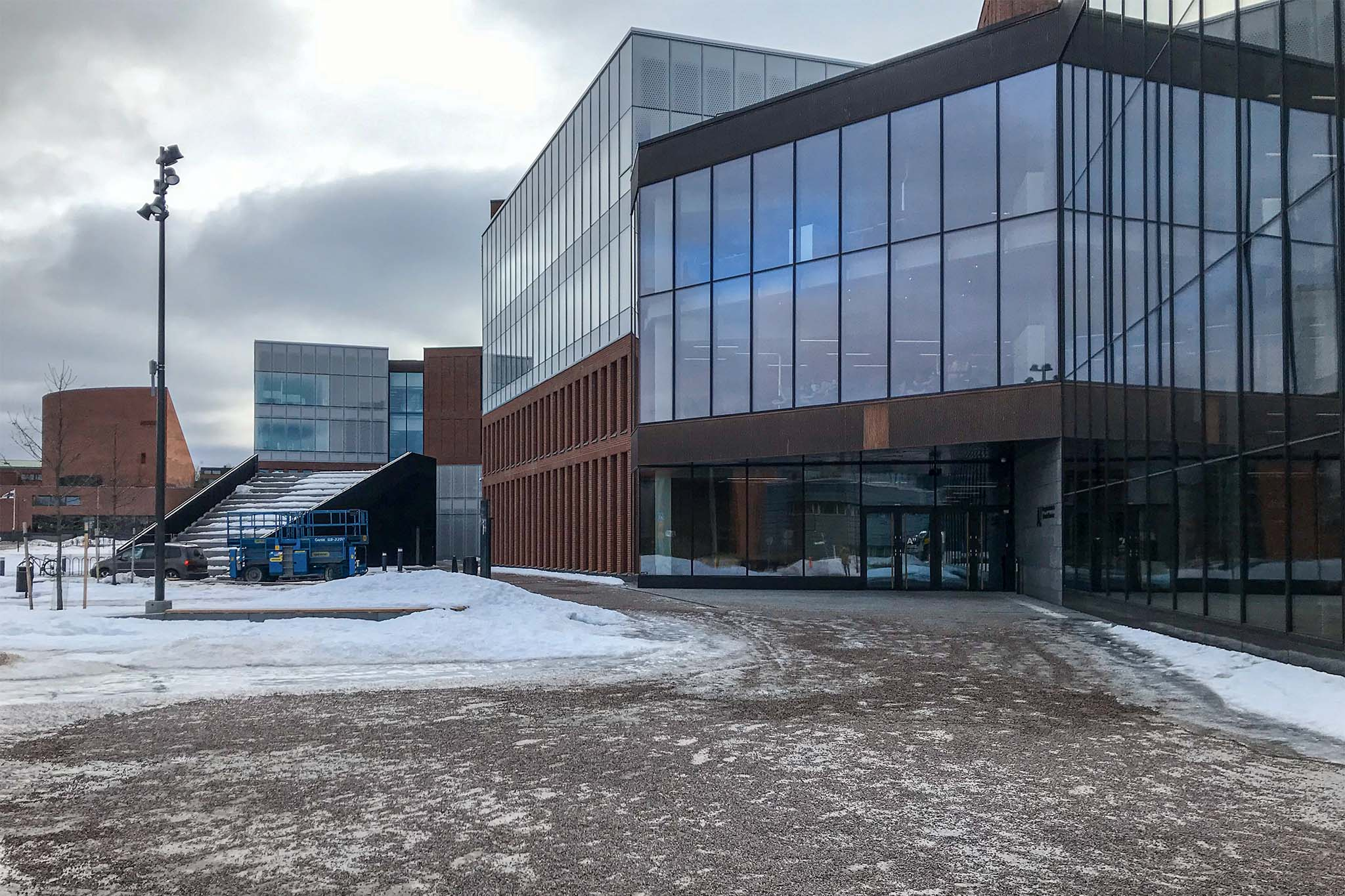
Entrance.

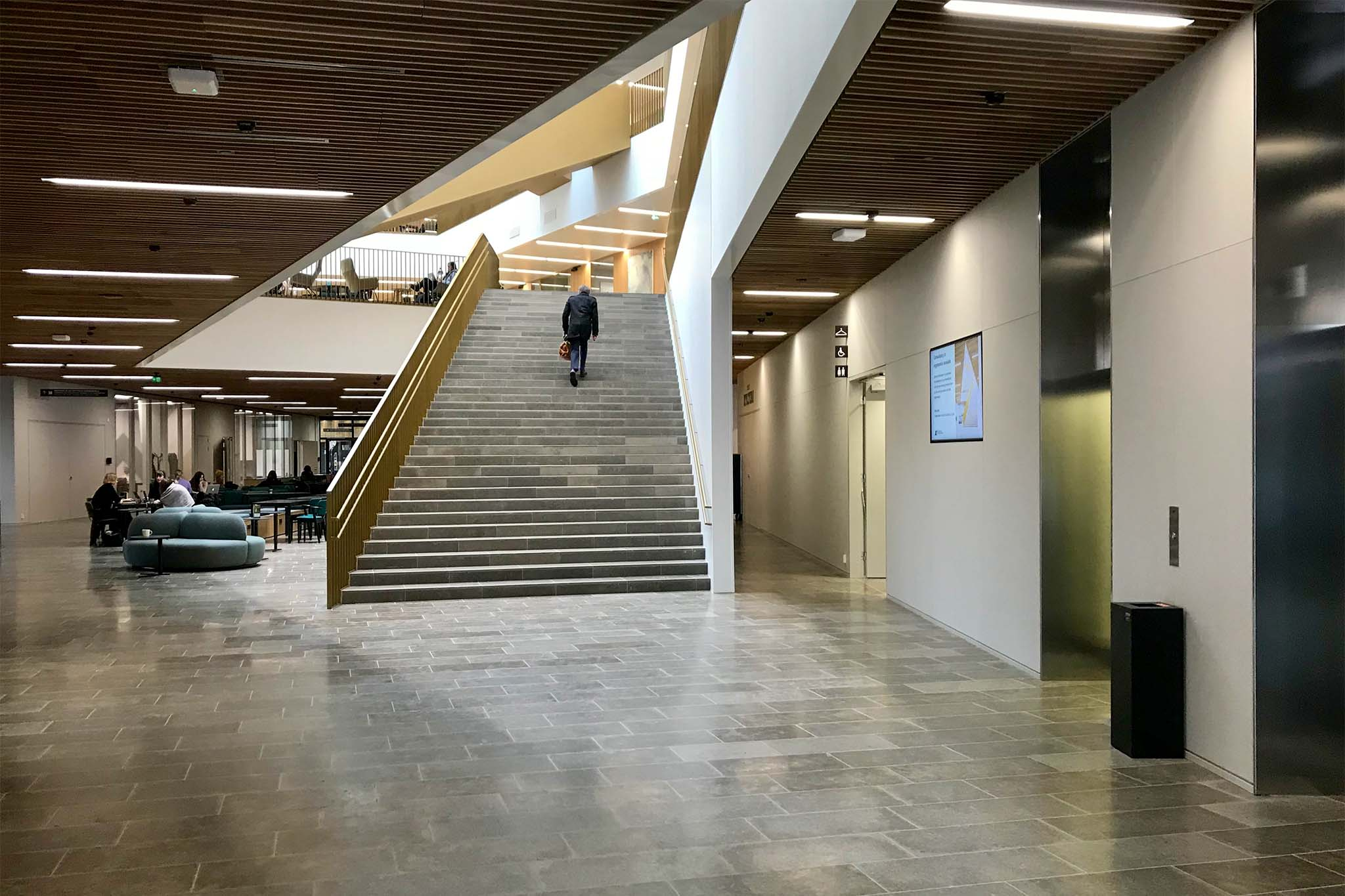
Lobby.

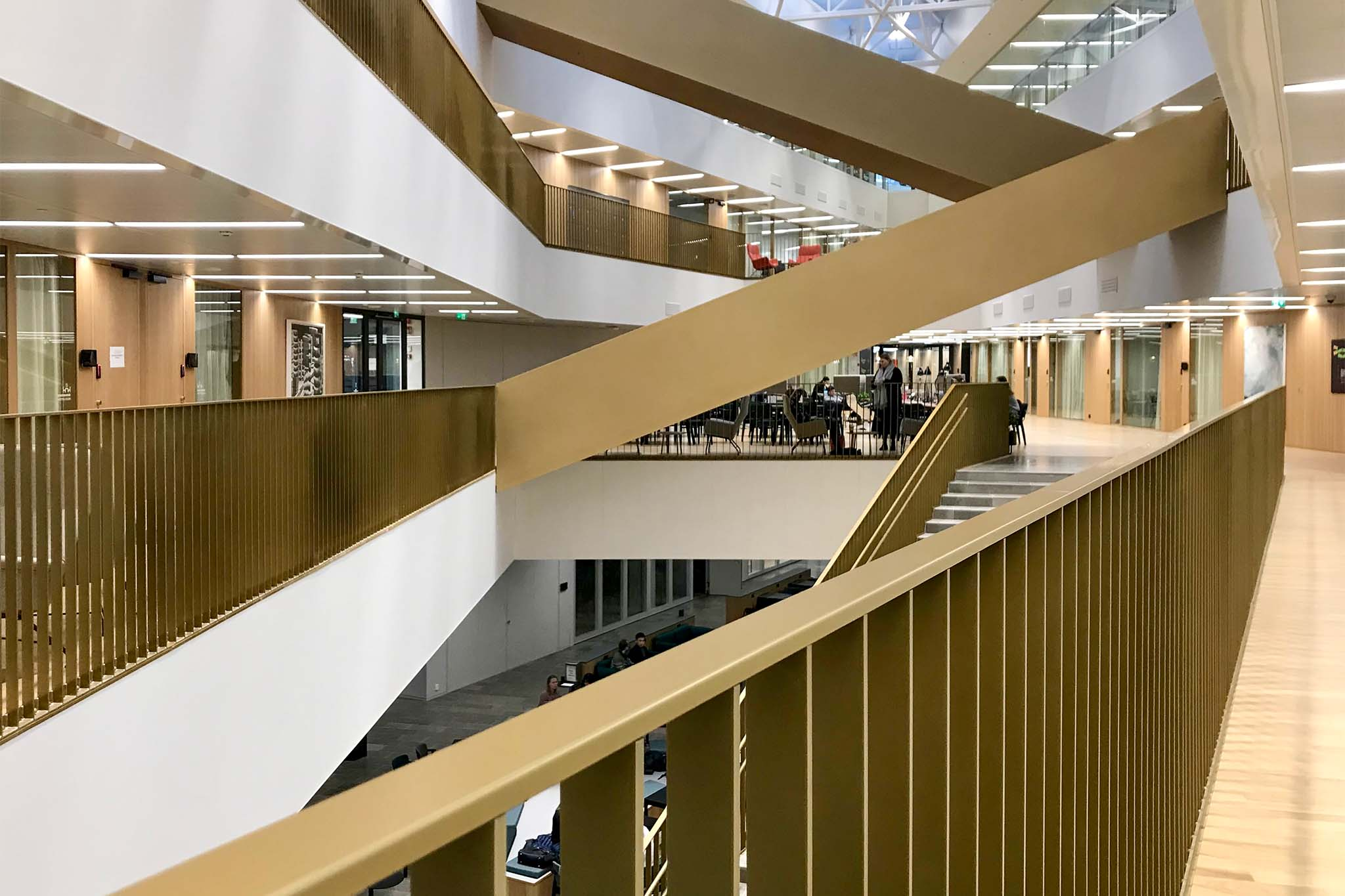
Interior.

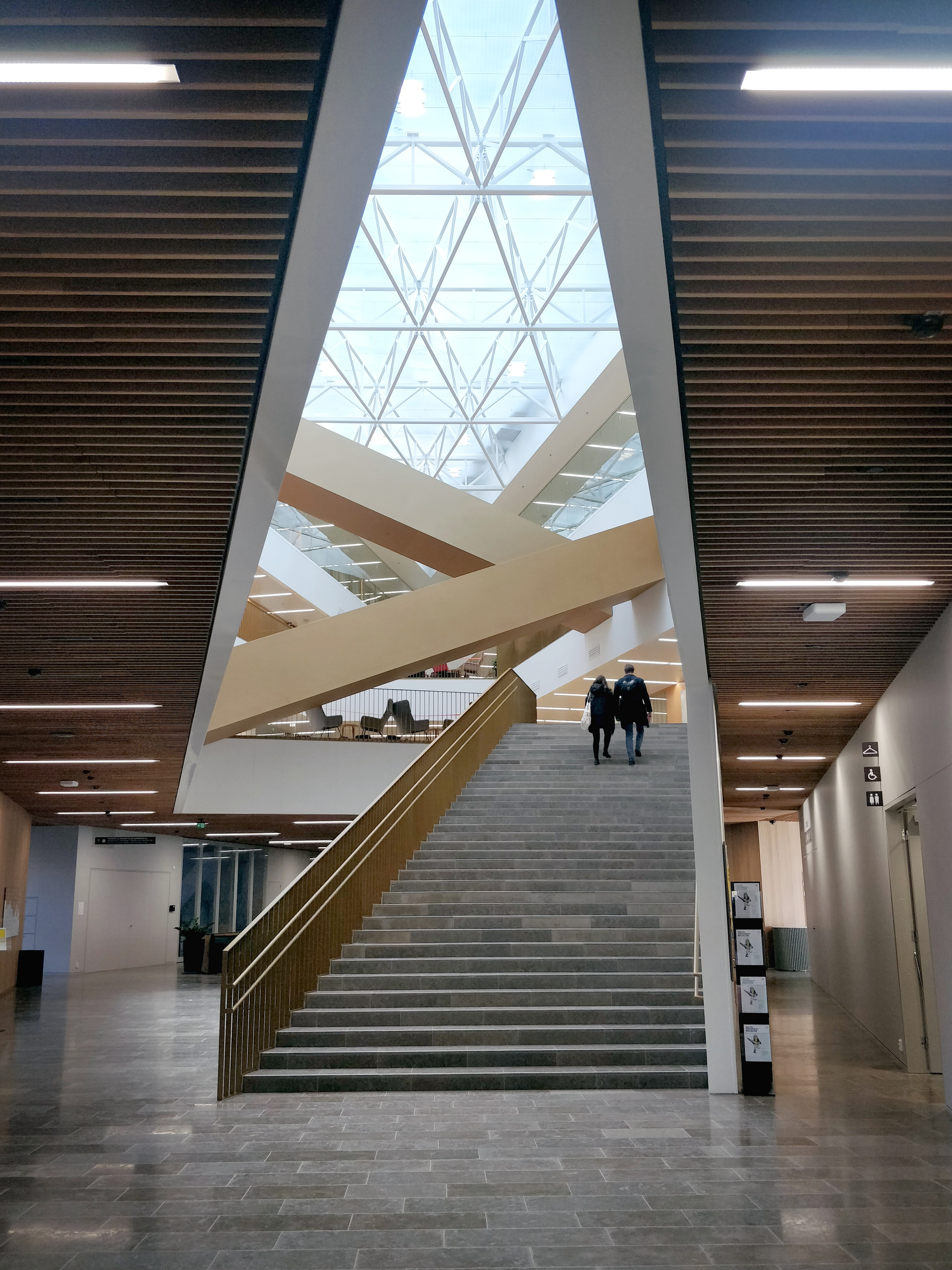
Atrium.
