= The Decline and Fall of Nokia =

2014 book by David J. Cord

- Author: David J. Cord
- Cover artist: Anders Carpelan
- Language: English
- Genre: Company profile
- Publisher: Schildts & Söderströms
- Publication date: April 2014
- Publication place: Finland
- Media type: Print (hardcover)
- Pages: 305
- ISBN: 978-951-52-3320-2

The Decline and Fall of Nokia is a company profile book detailing the collapse of the mobile phone company Nokia. The author is David J. Cord, an American expatriate living in Finland.

== Book for sale summary ==
The book covers the history of the company Nokia from 2006 to 2013, during the upheaval in the mobile device industry caused by newcomers Apple, Google and low-cost competitors. To a lesser extent it also covers Nokia Solutions and Networks, then a joint venture called Nokia Siemens Networks, during the same period.

The book examines Nokia's decline and relaunch the mobile-phone market, culminating in the sale of its handset division to Microsoft. It attributes the fall to entrenched bureaucracy that stalled decision-making, destructive internal competition, and a failure to recognise the importance of lifestyle devices such as the iPhone. Other factors include Nokia's weakness in North America and a failed shift from hardware to services, exemplified by the Ovi initiative. Rather than a lack of ideas, the book argues, poor middle management prevented innovations from reaching the market.

Cord spreads the blame for Nokia's fall onto former CEO Olli-Pekka Kallasvuo, and the company's faulty organisational structure. According to the book, the reason Nokia declined to switch to Android was because Samsung was much stronger and executives were afraid to compete against them in that ecosystem.

The author discusses a theory that skewed decision making during the tenure as CEO of Stephen Elop was due to his conscious desire to do deals specially favorable to his former employer of Microsoft; Cord admits that Elop’s actions appear suspicious, but maintains that they were all logical at the time in the eyes of subordinate Nokia executives who agreed with the decisions

== Development ==
After the completion of the author’s first book in 2012, Mohamed 2.0: Disruption Manifesto, his Finnish publisher asked him to write a book about Nokia. Cord initially declined, because he was working on a novel and thought the time wasn’t right to write about the company. When his novel was completed he began work on The Decline and Fall of Nokia.

== Reception ==
The book generated considerable attention from the press as it claims Sun Microsystems' co-founder Scott McNealy had been offered the job of Nokia CEO in 2010 but declined. The board of directors next looked to promote long-time Nokia executive Anssi Vanjoki, but were stymied by major American investors, including Morgan Stanley, who demanded an outsider be chosen. The board’s third choice, according to the book, was Stephen Elop of Microsoft. Scott McNealy issued a statement, doubting that he was the "dream candidate" to succeed Kallasvuo and that he was never offered the job.

The process of choosing the CEO in 2010 had previously been wrapped in secrecy, so there was much speculation about Cord’s sources of information. One publication wondered if long-time chairman of the board Jorma Ollila had been the leak.
