= Risto Siilasmaa =

Finnish businessperson (born 1966)

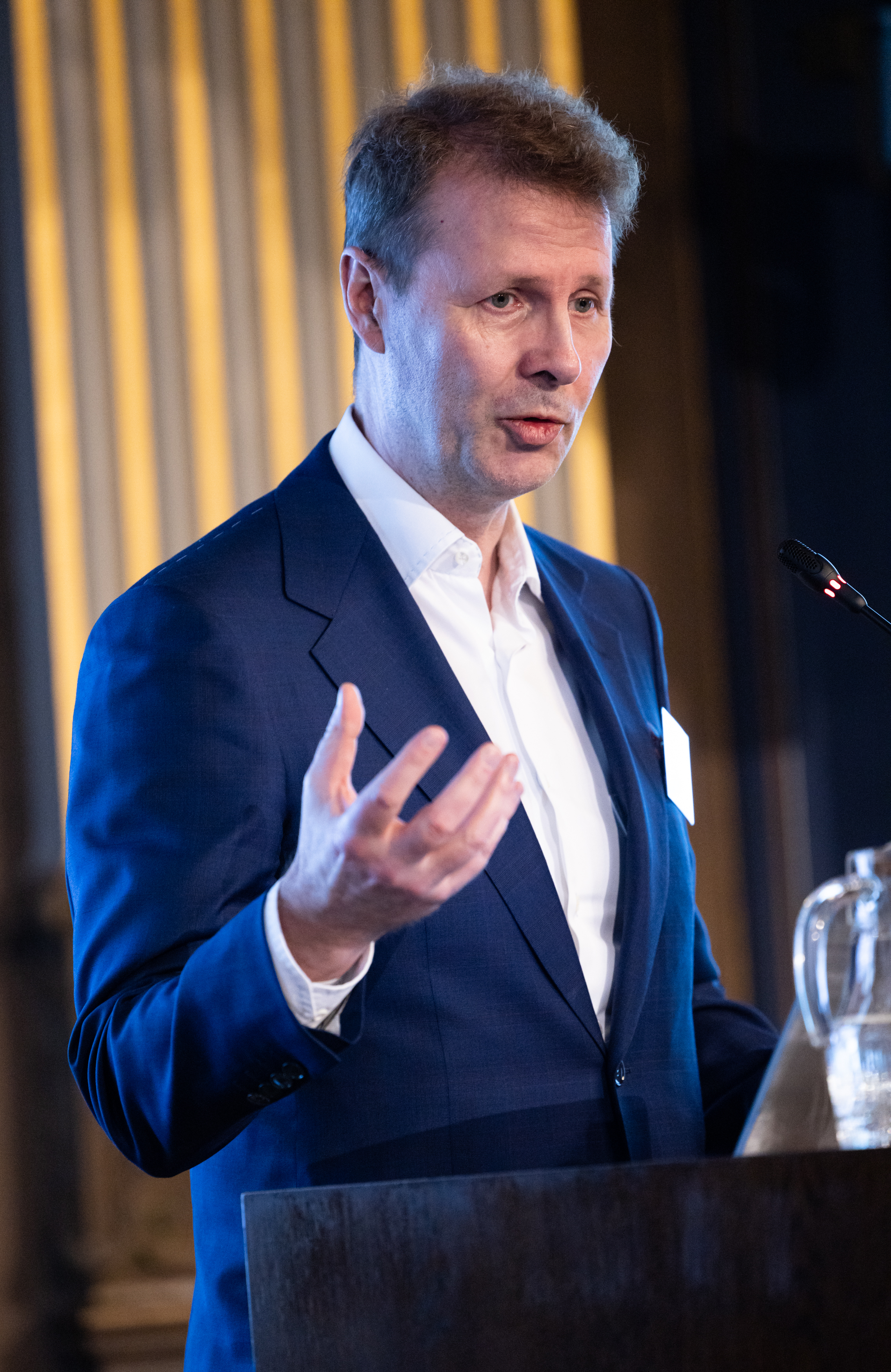
- Siilasmaa in 2023
- Born: Risto Kalevi Siilasmaa; 17 April 1966 (age 60); Helsinki, Finland
- Education: Helsinki University of Technology
- Occupations: Chairman and founder of F-Secure; Chairman of Elisa

Risto Kalevi Siilasmaa (born 17 April 1966) is a Finnish businessperson and the chairman, founder and former CEO of F-Secure Corporation (formerly Data Fellows), an anti-virus and computer security software company based in Helsinki, Finland. He is also the biggest shareholder of F-Secure, owning around 40% of the company. He was chairman of Nokia from 2012 to 2020.

== Education ==
Siilasmaa has a Master of Science degree from Helsinki University of Technology (now named: Aalto University), Department of Industrial Engineering and Management.

== Business ==
Siilasmaa founded F-Secure in 1988. He left his role as CEO of the company on 6 November 2006.

Siilasmaa is also well known as a business angel, investing in several technology startups such as Frosmo, Enevo and Wolt, and serving in their boards of directors. In his investing, he has stated that he is sometimes "motivated by soft values, not maximum returns."

=== Nokia ===
Siilasmaa joined Nokia's board of directors in 2008. After being appointed chairman of Nokia in mid-2012, he acted as interim CEO, after Stephen Elop from 3 September 2013 to 29 April 2014 when Rajeev Suri was appointed the official CEO. Since then, he has led the company in one of the most successful corporate transformations ever. Through three transactions that he negotiated – the purchase of complete ownership of Nokia Siemens Networks, the sale of the handset and phone business to Microsoft, the sale of the HERE business to Audi, BMW and Daimler, and the acquisition of Alcatel-Lucent – Nokia has transformed from a bankruptcy candidate to a successful global technology leader. This is reflected in Nokia's value which has gone up fivefold over roughly two years. Even more revealingly, the enterprise value has grown from a low of only less than 1.5 billion euros soon after Siilasmaa started as chairman to well over 20 billion euros in early 2015. In a September 2018 interview with CNN in Switzerland, he described Nokia as an "experimenter."

The transformation of Nokia has also included Siilasmaa renewing the board and the management, with the vast majority of employees newly joining in the company's new phase. Siilasmaa has often stated that all the atoms in Nokia have been changed but the spirit of the 150-year-old company lives on.

In October 2018, Siilasmaa published a book about Nokia, Transforming Nokia: The Power of Paranoid Optimism to Lead Through Colossal Change. In it, he criticises predecessor chairman Jorma Ollila's leadership style and claimed they fell out.

In December 2019, Siilasmaa announced to step down as chairman of Nokia's board of directors with then vice chair Sari Baldauf to succeed him in 2020.

== Other activities ==
=== Corporate boards ===
- Efecte, Member of the Board of Directors (since 2008)
- Ekahau, Chairman of the Board of Directors (since 2007)
- Elisa, Member of the Board of Directors (2008–2012)
- Nokia, Member of the Board of Directors, since 2012 as Chairman (2008–2020)
- Technology Industries of Finland, Member of the Board of Directors (2016-2018)

=== Non-profit organizations ===
- Confederation of Finnish Industries (EK), Vice Chairman of the Board of Directors (2017-2018)
- European Round Table of Industrialists (ERT), Member
- Helsinki University of Technology, Member of the Advisory Board
- Finnish Innovation Fund (Sitra), Member of the Research Council

== Personal life ==
Siilasmaa lives on the Kuusisaari island of Helsinki.

== Literature ==
Transforming Nokia: Paranoid Optimist, by Catherine Fredman and Risto Siilasmaa, 2018: In Transforming Nokia, Chairman of the Board Risto Siilasmaa offers his firsthand account of the company’s dramatic fall and astonishing turnaround. He reveals the reasons for its collapse and how other leaders can avoid the same fate. He shares the survival strategies and change-management methods he learned by leading people through crisis and steering the company through its wrenching reinvention. And he explains how the power of paranoid optimism and the precepts of what he calls “Entrepreneurial Leadership” enable leaders to build sustainable success.

Business positions
Preceded by Stephen Elop	CEO of Nokia Corporation; 2013–2014	Succeeded by Rajeev Suri
Preceded by Jorma Ollila	Chairman of Nokia; 2012–2020	Succeeded by Sari Baldauf
