= Sari Baldauf =

Finnish business executive (born 1955)

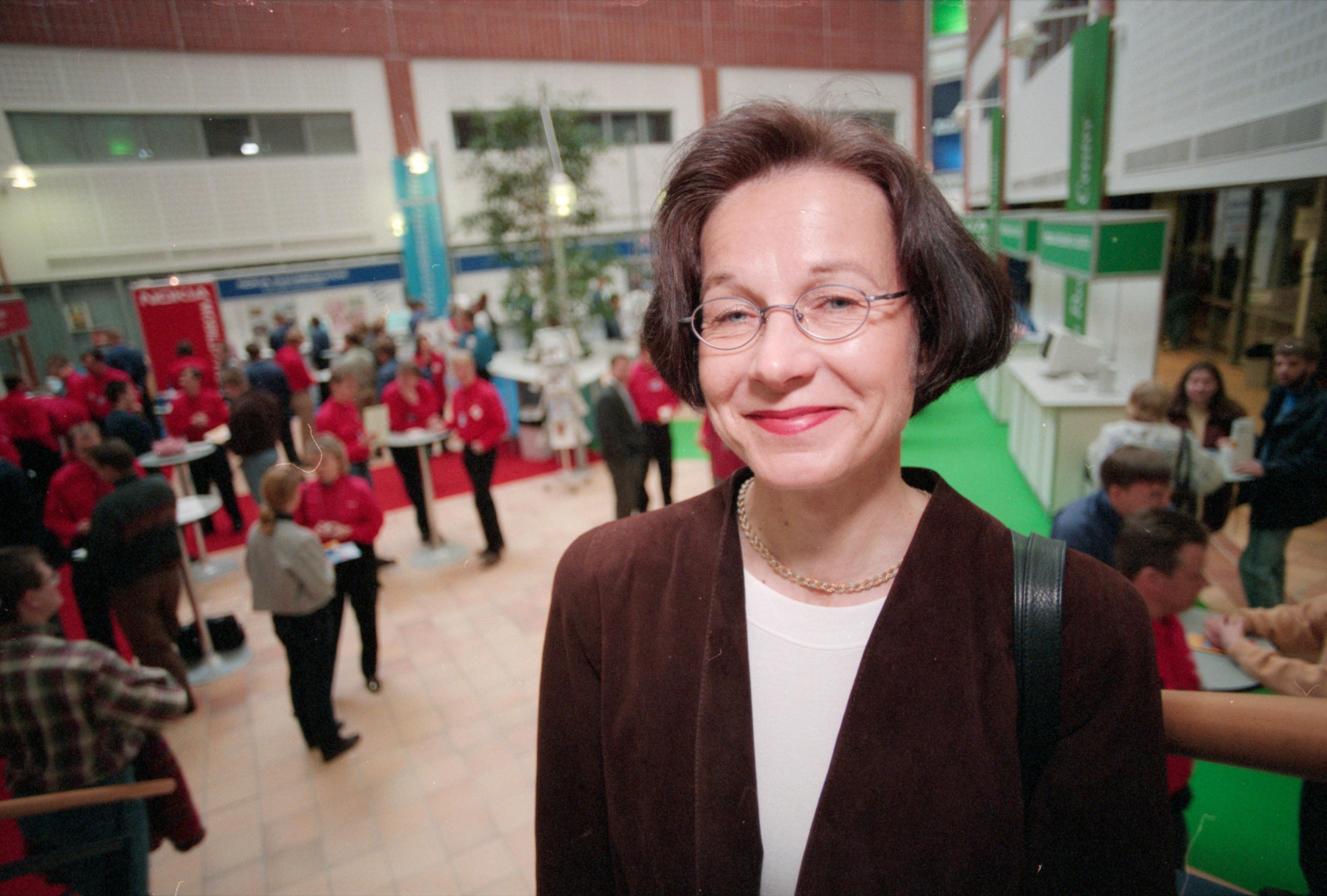
- Baldauf in 1998
- Born: 10 August 1955 (age 71); Kotka, Kymenlaakso, Finland
- Education: Aalto University (MBA)
- Occupation: Businesswoman
- Title: Chairwoman, Nokia

Sari Maritta Baldauf (born 10 August 1955 in Kotka, Finland) is a Finnish businesswoman who is chairwoman of the board of directors of Nokia. She joined the board in 2018 and became vice chair in 2019, before she succeeded Risto Siilasmaa as chairwoman in 2020. In January 2026, it was announced that Baldauf plans to step down as chairwoman at the annual general meeting in April 2026. Until 2005, she was head of Nokia's Networks Business Group.

== Education ==
Baldauf graduated as a Master of Business Administration from the Helsinki School of Economics. She received honorary doctorates in Technology (from the Helsinki University of Technology) and Business Administration (from the Turku School of Economics and Aalto University School of Business) in 1979.

== Business ==
Baldauf joined Nokia in 1983. She was selected into Nokia's Group Executive Board in 1994.

Baldauf was selected as the most influential female executive in the year 1998 by Fortune. In 2002, the Wall Street Journal named her as Europe's most successful female executive.

On 3 December 2004, Baldauf announced that she would resign from Nokia for personal reasons. She is or was a member of a number of executive boards of Finnish and international companies including Fortum, Capman, F-Secure, Hewlett-Packard and Daimler. In 2011, she replaced Matti Lehti as chairman of the board at the electrical utility company in Finland, Fortum, making her the first female chairman of a major Finnish company. She left the Fortum board in 2018. She is also a Member of the Board of Directors of Aalto University Foundation and the think tank Demos Helsinki.

Business positions
Preceded by Risto Siilasmaa	Chairwoman of Nokia Corporation; 2020–present	Incumbent
