= Mohamed 2.0 =

Biography of Mohamed El-Fatatry

Mohamed 2.0: Disruption Manifesto
- Author: David J. Cord
- Cover artist: Anders Carpelan
- Language: English, Swedish and Finnish
- Genre: Biography/Business
- Publisher: Schildts & Söderströms
- Publication date: April 2012
- Publication place: Finland
- Media type: Print (Hardcover)
- Pages: 235 pp
- ISBN: 978-951-52-2898-7

Mohamed 2.0: Disruption Manifesto is the authorized biography of Mohamed El-Fatatry. It documents the rise and fall of his company, the online social network Muxlim. The author is David J. Cord, an American expatriate living in Finland.

== Summary ==
Mohamed 2.0 chronicles the life of Mohamed El-Fatatry, an Egyptian national who grew up in the United Arab Emirates. While young, El-Fatatry became intensely interested in the Internet, and taught college-level courses on web development even before he graduated from high school. After deciding move to Finland to study technology, he created Muxlim there in 2006. It was intended as a social network for Muslims that was to be open and liberal, and to serve as a bridge between religions and cultures. However, both he and the site struggled against some of the more conservative elements of the religious community.

Muxlim became quite popular, particularly with Muslims resident in America and Western Europe, and the site received extensive media coverage. El-Fatatry’s ideas of using the website as a meeting place of different nationalities and religions led him to be invited to speak to both the United Nations and American White House staff. Despite the widespread attention, the company continually struggled with finances. The book describes the attempts by El-Fatatry to simultaneously secure funding, increase sales, and develop the related websites. When the social network did not develop as the company had hoped, it transitioned first into a Muslim-related content aggregator and then into a business consultant. With meager sales and no more incoming venture capital and investment, Muxlim was shut down early in 2012.

The book also details El-Fatatry’s philosophy and his future plans for developing technology-related businesses.

== Development ==
The book was originally intended to be an autobiography, but El-Fatatry recommended the publisher contact Cord. The project then turned into a biography.

== Reception ==
The book generated controversy even before it was released. Esa Mäkinen of Helsingin Sanomat received an advance copy and wrote a critical article about the poor financial performance of Muxlim. Mäkinen detailed the heavy financial losses the company sustained, the public funding it received, and the small size of the online traffic generated by the site. The article also erroneously reported that El-Fatatry contributed €46,000 to Finnish Presidential hopeful Eva Biaudet’s campaign, an accusation that received heavy press coverage in Finland (the article has since been corrected).

In response to some of the business-related criticism, ArcticStartup, the largest website reporting on technology startups in the Nordic region, defended growth entrepreneurship in an editorial and published a rebuttal from El-Fatatry.

Critic Tommi Aitio of the business newspaper Kauppalehti praised Mohamed 2.0, saying it was "quality entertainment, drama that even Hollywood would never have come up with. Muxlim’s story might have been a glorious failure, but David J. Cord’s book is, even in its idealising, simply brilliant".

Janne Wass of Ny Tid was more critical, suggesting it should not be called a "biography" since he learned very little about El-Fatatry from the book, and noted that his portrayal was "slightly sanitised". Wass also complained that El-Fatatry’s views on technology contained nothing new or revolutionary.

== See also ==
- Muxlim
- Islamictorrents
