= Christian Fredrikson =

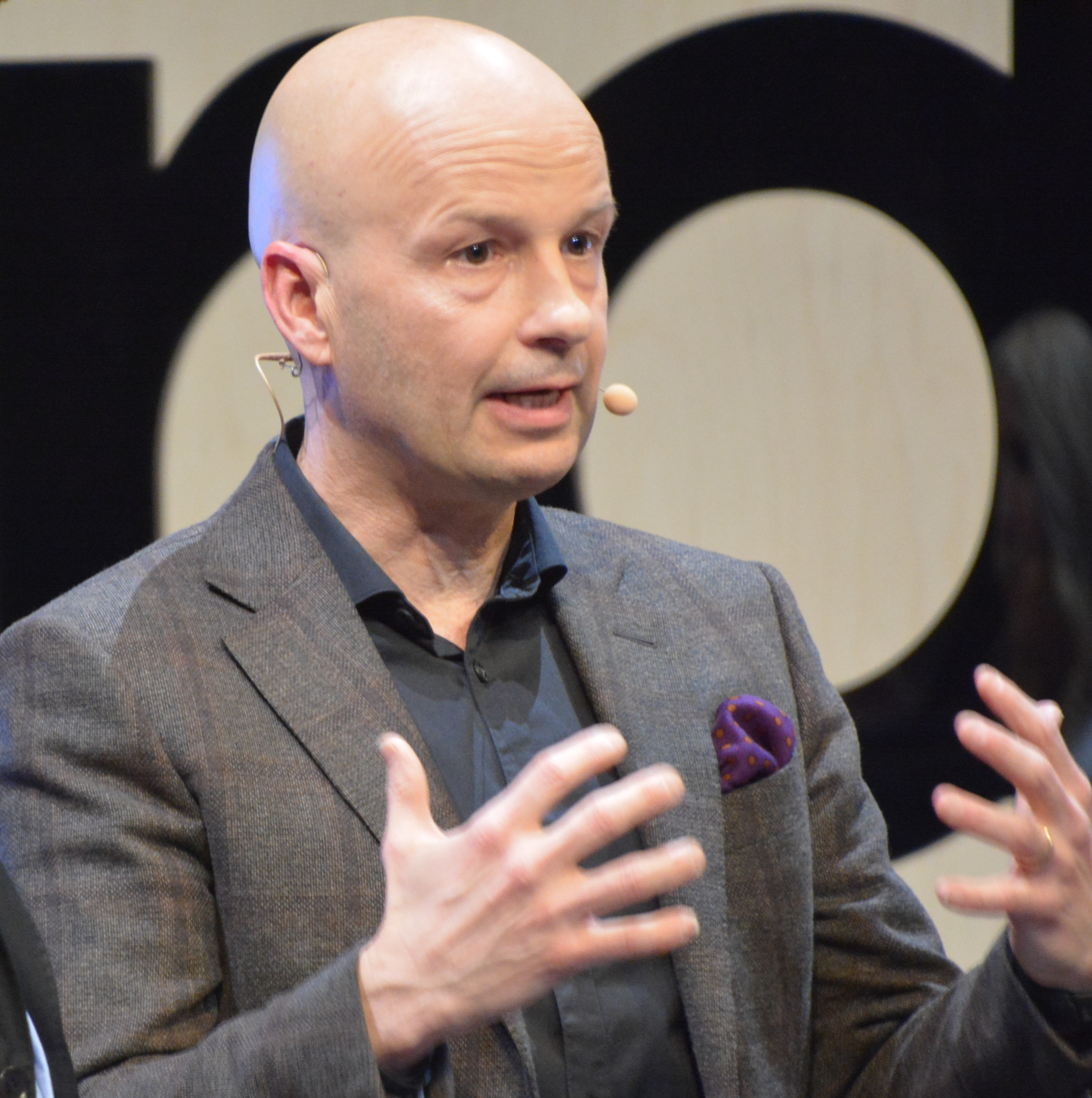
Christian Fredrikson in 2017

Christian Fredrikson (born 1964 in Finland) is the president and CEO at F-Secure Corporation, an anti-virus and computer security and computer software company based in Helsinki, Finland.

Christian Fredrikson started on his position on January 16, 2012. Previously, Fredrikson worked at Nokia Siemens Networks, where he was responsible for global sales of the Network Systems business unit. He has also been Head of the Asia Pacific Region and Head of OBS Business Unit (Operation and Business Software) at Nokia Siemens Networks.

== Education ==
Fredikson holds a master's degree in engineering from Åbo Akademi University in Turku, Finland.
