= Elin Törnudd =

Finnish chief librarian (1924–2008)

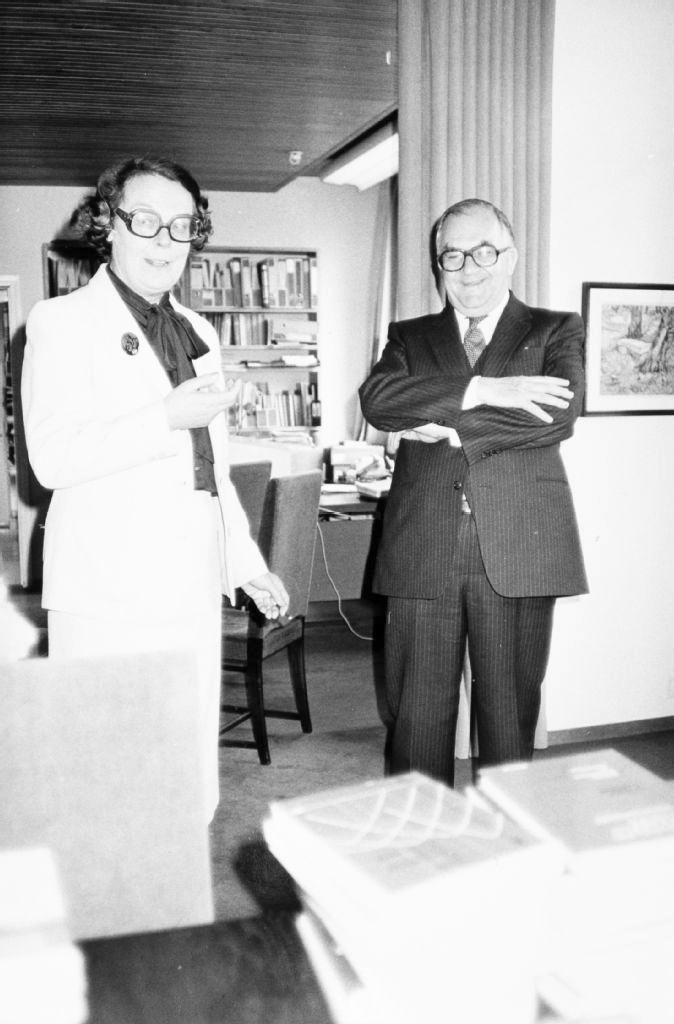
- Born: 22 April 1924; Helsinki
- Died: 18 August 2008 (aged 84); Espoo

Elin Maria Törnudd (22 April 1924 – 18 August 2008) was a Finnish chief librarian and professor.

== Biography ==
Elin Maria Törnudd was born in Helsinki in 1924. She graduated with a degree in chemistry, completing a master in 1950 from Helsinki University of Technology. She went on to complete a masters in library science from the Carnegie Institute of Technology in Pittsburgh in 1953. Törnudd began as an information specialist before becoming the chief librarian in the Helsinki University of Technology Library. She worked there from 1968 to 1991, and in 1982 she received the honorary title of professor.

Törnudd also held a number of positions within organisations: Secretary General of NORDFORSK and Chair or Vice Chair of OECD Scientific and Technical Information Policy Group, and NORDINFO. She also chaired the International Council of the UNESCO General Information Program.

Törnudd was the President of the International Association of Scientific and Technological University Libraries (IATUL) from 1990 to 1992 and remains an honorary member of the Association.
