= Margit Lindqvist =

Finnish architect

- Born: March 28, 1890; Helsinki
- Died: March 2, 1967 (aged 76)
- Occupation: Architect

Margaret "Margit" Lindqvist (March 28, 1890 Helsinki - March 2, 1967) was a Finnish architect and author who wrote in Swedish.

Lindqvist graduated as an architect from the Helsinki University of Technology in 1915 and worked as an architect for 22 years. She was a journalist and tour operator.

== Works ==
- Vi kastar loss. Söderström, Helsingfors 1946
- The tragic fate of Georg Fredrik Tigerstedt. Svenska litteratursällskapet i Finland, Helsingfors 1949
- From Brittany to the Sahara. Söderström, Helsingfors 1954
