= Frosmo =

Frosmo Ltd.
- Type: Private
- Industry: Conversion Rate Optimization, Web Development
- Founded: 2008
- Headquarters: Helsinki, Finland
- Number of locations: 6
- Area served: Worldwide
- Key people: Mikael Gummerus, CEO
- Number of employees: 20 (March, 2016)
- Website: www.frosmo.com

Frosmo is a software and service company founded in 2008. The company holds headquarters in Helsinki, Finland, and it has additional offices also in Poland, United Kingdom, Singapore, Spain and Sweden. The company actively develops and offers a JavaScript-based conversion rate optimization solution, which can "bypass any limitations of current CMS or eCommerce platforms".

== History ==
Having founded a mobile gaming company DoDreams earlier, Mikael Gummerus learned that there's a gap in the gaming market for an intelligent personalization software. In late 2008, Frosmo was launched as a gaming platform which could analyze gamers’ behavior and personalize the service accordingly.

Roughly half a year later, Frosmo secured an angel round from highly distinguished investors and individuals, such as Risto Siilasmaa. The actual size of the investment round wasn't disclosed, but it was speculated to be "relatively large".

Although the gaming platform peaked at 750,000 monthly active users, the company quickly realized that the technology could be just as well implemented outside of that industry. During 2010, Frosmo developed and launched Social Optimizer, their first product aimed for website personalization. It was one of the first of such tools to make use of Facebook's like button plug-in, which was released in April of the same year. The plug-in acts as a gateway for detailed visitor data, as VentureBeat explains:

The analytics are useful because the Facebook Like buttons have access to the information that people put on their Facebook pages. You can thus aggregate the demographics of the people who Like your web site. You can determine their age, their occupations, their job titles, and how often they visit your web site. You can see what they look at and gather statistics on a daily basis that show what kind of audience your web site reaches. In turn, you can take that aggregate data and share it with potential web site advertisers.

While the data collection and analyzing capabilities of the company's software got positive feedback, the UI was deemed to have a poor design. For example, a part of their solution called Social Optimizer, a tool responsible for displaying personalized messages, used pop-ups that were "too ugly to click". In 2014, the company estimated it gained deals worth of 1 million euros from World Travel Market Travel Tech trade show alone.
