= Gustaf Komppa =

Finnish chemist (1867–1949)

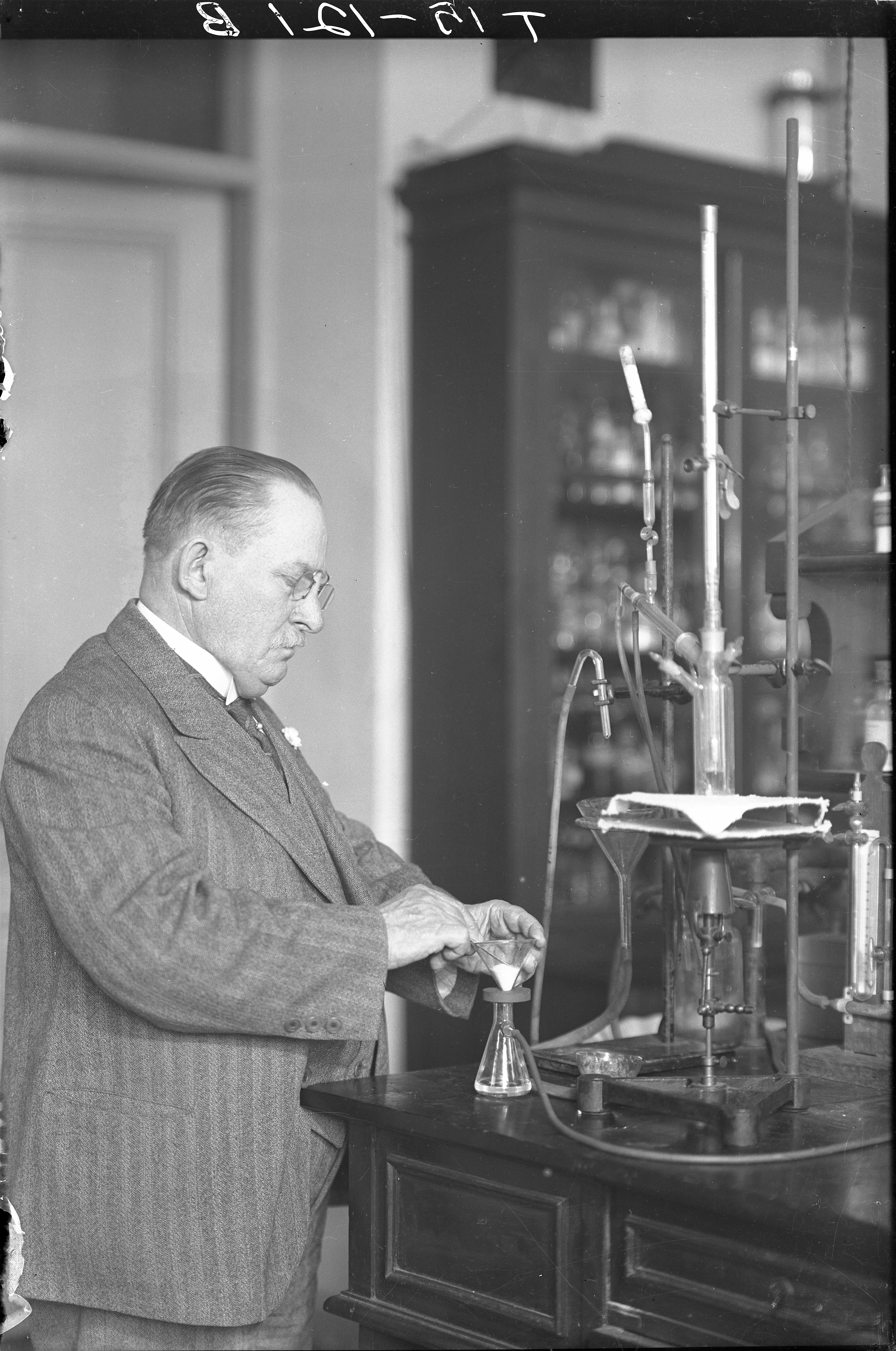
Gustaf Komppa

Gustaf Komppa (28 July 1867 in Viipuri – 20 January 1949 in Helsinki) was a Finnish chemist best known for a world-first in commercializing total synthesis, that of camphor in 1903.

Komppa was born in Viipuri in 1867. While in secondary school in Viborg, Hugo Zilliacus, the teacher of arithmetic and science, cemented Komppa's interest in scientific research. Komppa furnished his own chemistry laboratory in the carriage shed of his parents' house after the instructions in Julius Adolph Stöckhard's book Schule der Chemie. He graduated from the Helsinki University of Technology in 1891 and subsequently worked for a while in Switzerland with Arthur Hantzsch before obtaining his Ph.D. Shortly after returning to Finland he became the professor of chemistry at the Helsinki University of Technology. From 1935 to 1945 he was chancellor of the University of Turku. He was also a board member in several major Finnish corporations and a founding member of Finnish Academy of Science and Letters. Universities of Uppsala, Copenhagen and Heidelberg invited him as an honorary doctor.

Komppa worked extensively with organic synthesis of several compounds, most notably camphor and terpenoids. The camphor synthesis was an important breakthrough, especially because he proceeded to commercialize a semisynthesis from tall oil-derived pinene. He also developed methods for converting peat into fuel. During his career Komppa published more than 200 research papers.
