= Stephen Elop =

Canadian businessman

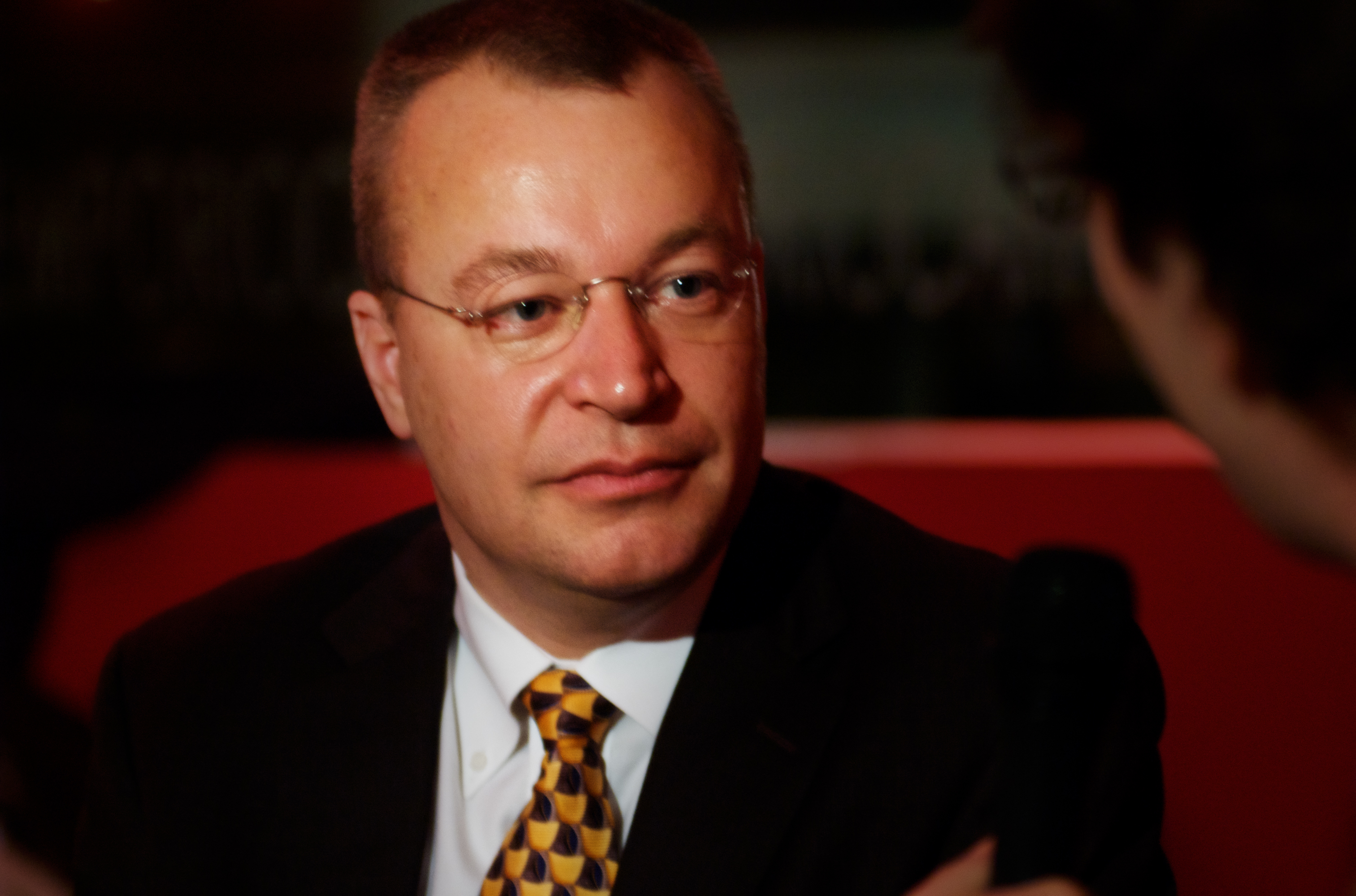
- Elop in 2008
- Born: 31 December 1963 (age 62); Ancaster, Ontario, Canada
- Education: McMaster University
- Spouse: Nancy Elop (m. 1987; div. 2014)
- Children: 5

Stephen Elop (born 31 December 1963) is a Canadian businessman who most recently worked at Australian telecom company Telstra from April 2016. In the past he had worked for Nokia as its first non-Finnish CEO and later as Executive Vice President, Devices & Services, as well as the head of the Microsoft Business Division, as the COO of Juniper Networks, as the president of worldwide field operations at Adobe Systems, in several senior positions in Macromedia and as the CIO at Boston Chicken.

He is best known for his ill-fated tenure as Nokia CEO from 2010 to 2014, which included controversies such as the "burning platform" memo and the company's partnership with Microsoft, resulting in the move to Windows Phone software exclusivity. He was criticised for some of his decisions, which resulted in the company suffering massive losses both financially and in market share. As then head of the Microsoft Devices Group, Elop was in charge of Microsoft's varied product offerings including Lumia phones, Surface Pro 3, and Xbox One. Since January 2016 he has had a role as Distinguished Engineering Executive in Residence within McMaster University's Faculty of Engineering, where he originally studied in the 1980s.

== Early life and education ==
Elop was born in Ancaster, Ontario, Canada, as the second of three children. His mother was a chemist and his father was an engineer at Westinghouse Electric Corporation. Both of them still live in Ancaster. His grandfather was a wireless operator who used morse code from ships in both the First World War and Second World War. Elop was influenced by and learned much about technology from his grandfather.

From 1981, Elop studied computer engineering and management at McMaster University, Hamilton, Ontario. After his first year at the University, Elop wrote the user operating manual, called the Orange Book, for the campus's new computer system, VAX-11/780. During that time he helped lay 22 kilometres of Ethernet cables around campus to build one of the first computer networks in Canada. He graduated second in his class with a bachelor's degree in 1986. In 2007, McMaster's Faculty of Engineering made Elop the second L.W. Shemilt Distinguished Engineering Alumni Award winner and in 2009, he was awarded an Honorary Doctor of Science Degree by McMaster.

== Career ==
After graduating, Elop joined a Toronto-based software development firm called Soma Inc. Soma was later acquired by Lotus Development Corporation of Massachusetts, United States, and Elop moved over, serving as director of consulting. In 1992 he became CIO of Boston Chicken, until the firm filed for Chapter 11 bankruptcy in 1998.

=== Macromedia and Adobe ===
In 1998 he joined Macromedia's Web/IT department and worked at the company for seven years, where he held several senior positions, including as: general manager of the e-business division; executive vice president of worldwide field operations; COO; and finally as CEO from January 2005 for three months before their acquisition by Adobe Systems was announced in April 2005. Due to family reasons, Elop lived at his Canadian home in Limehouse, Ontario, commuting to work in California with Air Canada.

During Elop's tenure, Macromedia continued to deliver widely used software suites like Macromedia Studio 8. Based on the performance of the company during this time, Elop was able to guide the company through a successful acquisition that benefited shareholders. With an exchange of $3.4 billion in stock, the acquisition combined the companies’ document management, web publishing and online video delivery tools. It proved to be a profitable move for Macromedia shareholders. After the announcement of the agreement, Macromedia shares were valued at $41.86, notably above the then current market value of $33.45. It has been claimed Elop pushed Macromedia Flash Player to get into the mobile market and he pushed Macromedia Flash to widely used for streaming media market until Flash was replaced by the HTML5 in 2010s. Also Stephen Elop pushed Macromedia Dreamweaver to a widely used web editor software. At Macromedia, Elop was nicknamed "The General" due to his military-style haircut.

He was then president of worldwide field operations at Adobe, tendering his resignation in June 2006 and leaving on 5 December. Elop was paid a $500,000 salary with $315,000 bonus and $1.88 million severance package during his time at Adobe.

=== Juniper and Microsoft ===
After leaving Adobe, Elop was COO of Juniper Networks for exactly one year from January 2007 – 2008. During his short tenure he drove an internal overhaul and was credited for applying operational efficiency. In late 2007 Elop was approached by Microsoft CEO, Steve Ballmer, with whom he met several times including chairman Bill Gates. Juniper's CEO Scott Kriens intended to name Elop as the new CEO before Elop revealed he was leaving for Microsoft. Elop named this his toughest professional moment in a Bloomberg interview. Juniper's stock price rose 75% throughout 2007.

Elop's spell at Microsoft started on 11 January 2008, as the head of the Business Division, responsible for the Microsoft Office and Microsoft Dynamics line of products, and as a member of the company's senior leadership team. He was effectively leading the largest division of the world's largest software company (as the Business Division was Microsoft's largest source of income). It was during this time that the Business Division successfully released Office 2010, Office 365 and Windows Azure, giving record profits for the Business Division. He became known as an operator and a change agent because of successes at Microsoft. Businessweek credited Elop with pushing Microsoft to develop cloud-based versions of the company's programs, and asserted that this helped Microsoft maintain its dominance, while holding off startups looking to disrupt its traditional business model. Also during his tenure as president, the Business Division formed an alliance with Nokia on 12 August 2009 to bring Microsoft Office Mobile to Symbian OS.

=== CEO of Nokia ===
On 10 September 2010, it was announced that Elop would become Nokia's CEO, replacing the dismissed Olli-Pekka Kallasvuo, and becoming the first non-Finnish director in Nokia's history. Nokia's chairman Jorma Ollila commented: "Stephen has the right industry experience and leadership skills." Some analysts predicted closer Nokia and Microsoft cooperation following Elop's debut. His tenure began on 21 September. His family stayed in Canada. On 11 March 2011 Nokia announced that it had paid Elop a $6 million signing bonus, "compensation for lost income from his prior employer," on top of his $1.4 million annual salary.

At the time of Elop's appointment, Nokia had been struggling in the face of increasing competition. The company's overall mobile phone market share in Q3 2010 was 28.2 percent, its lowest share since 1999, and a decline of 8.5 percent compared to the same quarter in 2009. On his first day as CEO, Nokia also announced yet another delay of the release of its flagship, the Nokia N8.

On his first day of work as CEO, Elop e-mailed every Nokia employee asking what changes they like to see at Nokia and what they do not. Elop was open to the employees and gave them the chance to voice their opinions - unusual for Nokia under his bureaucratic predecessors and chairman. Elop approached employees with his personal stories of "At Microsoft we beat Google [referring to Microsoft Office and Google Apps]. We can beat Apple just as well." During a private presentation to employees in 2011, Elop called for open dialogue within the company's environment.

In 2010 Q4, Elop started the Project Sea Eagle. One task of the Project Sea Eagle was to estimate outsourcing the mobile operating system, including Android and Windows Phone. Later, because of intellectual property and patent conflicts, such as Google Play and Nokia Ovi (especially Google Maps and Nokia Here), Elop refused Google and Android. In the Project Sea Eagle, Elop analyzed that "Just like Hewlett-Packard (formerly Compaq) became the equivalent term of Windows hardware, Nokia became the equivalent term of Symbian, Samsung will become the equivalent term of Android. If Nokia joins Android, its profits will continously shrink, just like Android OEMs other than Samsung". In 2010, Microsoft promised Nokia that if Nokia joins Windows Phone, Microsoft can pay 1 billion dollars Platform Support Payments per year to Nokia in at least 3 years, Nokia is allowed to use Nokia Here in Windows Phone devices, and Nokia can get patent protection from Microsoft.

During Elop's tenure (2010 to 2014), Nokia's stock price dropped 62%, their mobile phone market share was halved, their smartphone market share fell from 33% to 3%, and the company suffered a cumulative €4.9 billion loss.

==== "Burning Platform" memo ====
Sometime in early 2011, Elop issued a company internal memo titled "Burning Platform", which was leaked to the press. The memo likened Nokia's situation in the smartphone market to a person standing on a burning oil platform ("platform" being a reference to the name given to operating systems such as Symbian, Apple iOS and Google Android). It also mentions the introduction to a "new strategy" on 11 February. Elop stresses in the memo how significantly the market has changed:

The battle of devices has now become a war of ecosystems, where ecosystems include not only the hardware and software of the device, but developers, applications, ecommerce, advertising, search, social applications, location-based services, unified communications and many other things. Our competitors aren't taking our market share with devices; they are taking our market share with an entire ecosystem. This means we're going to have to decide how we either build, catalyse or join an ecosystem.

The memo was not intended for the public but was eventually leaked by Engadget on 8 February 2011, becoming widely circulated and receiving a large deal of attention. The "new strategy" bit highly speculated to tech bloggers that Nokia would form an alliance with Microsoft, particularly after Google's Vic Gundotra tweeted "Two turkeys do not make an Eagle" shortly after the leak. It was then reported that Nokia's VP Anssi Vanjoki originally said this quote in 2005 about BenQ's purchase of Siemens's mobile phone business.

The memo was seen by some in the media as a necessary wake-up call for Nokia, and Engadget called it "one of the most exciting" CEO memos they have seen. However Nokia's Board of Directors saw the memo as an act of misjudgment and Chairman Jorma Ollila bitterly criticized it at a board meeting. This leaked memo (along with the new strategy two days later) led to the term "Elop effect" being used by opponents of the strategy. The term was coined by former Nokia executive Tomi Ahonen, who said it "combines the Ratner effect with the Osborne effect", meaning both publicly attacking one's own products and promising a successor to a current product too long before it is available.

In an interview with the Financial Post, Elop described the memo as "a very powerful statement of the reality of the situation without a lot of marketing polish on it."

==== Shift to Windows Phone ====
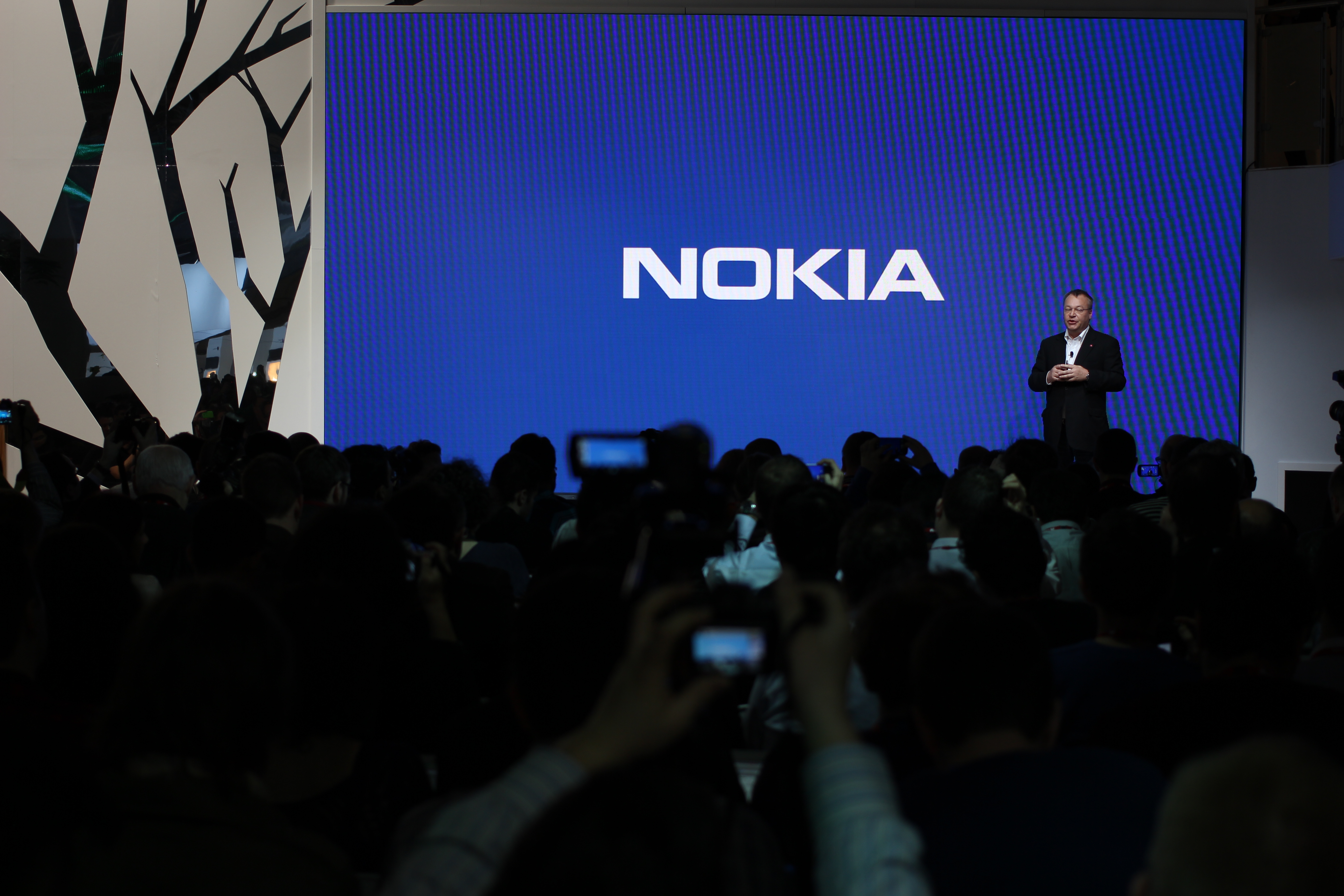
Elop on stage at the 2014 Mobile World Congress

On 11 February 2011 in a press conference in London, Elop officially announced the new strategy for Nokia, which involved a "strategic partnership" with Microsoft and shifting its smartphone strategy to Microsoft's Windows Phone, whilst gradually phasing out their in-house Symbian and MeeGo operating systems (expected it to be finalized by 2016, but actually finished in January 2014, and plans for any MeeGo devices beyond the Nokia N9 were scrapped). Elop also quoted Winston Churchill, "The pessimist sees the difficulty in every opportunity, but an optimist sees the opportunity in every difficulty." The final decision of a partnership with Microsoft was made the night before the conference. Nokia chairman Ollila supported the Microsoft alliance and predicted the business will strongly recover.

Questioned on why he decided to go with Windows Phone rather than choosing Android, Elop said: "The fundamental thing we were looking at was the ability to differentiate. As a member of the Android ecosystem, there were ways that we could see that we could differentiate, but we were worried over time how much differentiation we could continue to maintain or extend." The move was seen as a risky 'all-eggs-in-one-basket' strategy, inspired by his previous success at Macromedia by putting all focus on Flash in the early 2000s.

The first Nokia Windows Phone smartphone shipped in November 2011, the Nokia Lumia 800, was made in the form of a device design identically similar (only an additional camera button was added) to the Nokia N9, the first MeeGo device. The N9 enjoyed positive reviews for attractive hardware and a well-designed software experience—though at launch reviewers noted that a healthy software ecosystem was non-existent and would almost certainly not develop. However Elop stuck with the Microsoft deal, saying that MeeGo development will not continue even with the N9's success, a move that was widely criticised.

From Q3 2010 to Q3 2011, Nokia's smartphone sales had steeply declined by 34 percent, from 27.2 million units to 16.8 million. In the next year-on-year results, and following the release of its first Windows Phones, its smartphone sales had declined by more than half, from 16.8 million to 6.3 million units.

In Q2 2012, Nokia announced the Lumia 900, but in June 2012 Microsoft, without pre-notifying Nokia, announced that the new Windows Phone 8 would not support all Windows Phone 7 devices because of kernel changes.

In an interview held late 2012, Elop stated the reason for switching to Windows instead of Android:

"the single most important word is 'differentiation'. Entering the Android environment late, we knew we would have a hard time differentiating."

When asked if he regretted this choice in 2013, Elop said "What we were worried about a couple of years ago was the very high risk that one hardware manufacturer could come to dominate Android" thanks to vertical integration, and pointing out "Now fast forward to today and examine the Android ecosystem, and there's a lot of good devices from many different companies, but one company [Samsung] has essentially now become the dominant player". Elop noted that Nokia was well behind and would have to play catch up to Samsung, saying "we were respectful of the fact that we were quite late in making that decision. Many others were in that space already". Elop also justified Windows Phone as giving Nokia a chance to market itself as an alternative to Apple and Samsung. In another interview in 2013, Elop implied that Samsung Electronics would have been dominant in the Android space, leaving no space for other OEMs. A journalist from The Guardian agreed, noting HTC's decline in revenue. However, later on Nokia would begin reweighing its options and at Mobile World Congress held in February 2014 Stephen Elop took stage to unveil Nokia's first Android Phone, Nokia X.

Following the launch of the Nokia Lumia 920 flagship and its positive reception and apparent strong sales, Elop said to an Yle newscaster in December 2012: "...if you think about the last year, it's been a very difficult year. We've made many difficult decisions, we've made changes. But what we've also been doing is our very best work in making great products and getting them to consumers. So whether it's the Lumia 920, whether it is your Asha Full Touch products - the people of Nokia are doing their best work, but what's happening now, is that it's not us saying that, it's the people around the world. Our employees are feeling that, [...] so that creates a sense of hope and optimism. Now at the same time, we know we have a lot of hard work still had [...] but there's that sense that the hard work, that that seesaw has really begun to pay off. You feel that in the company." He also thanked the Finnish shareholders for supporting Nokia during its "darkest days."

The company's best-selling model was the Nokia Lumia 520, although as a budget class product it suggested that Nokia continued to struggle in the high-end market, despite positive reception of the award winning Nokia Lumia 1020 cameraphone.

==== Criticism and reputation ====
During his tenure, Elop faced vocal criticism from both industry specialists and employees. In 2011, Elop announced that some 11,000 employees would have to be laid off as part of a plan to "restructure" Nokia's business, and in June 2012 it was announced that further 10,000 layoffs were in order and that several facilities would have to be closed down due to budget cuts. Some critics, especially in Finland, started to speculate that Elop could be a trojan horse, whose mission was to prepare Nokia for a future acquisition by Microsoft. Because of this, Elop was sometimes nicknamed as "Trojan.Win32.Stephen.Elop" or "Spy.Win32.Stephen.Elop". When confronted with the theory by an anonymous attendee of the 2011 Mobile World Congress, Elop denied the speculation stating, "The obvious answer is, no. But however, I am very sensitive to the perception and awkwardness of that situation. We made sure that the entire management team was involved in the process [...] Everyone on the management team believed this was the right decision," referring to Nokia's adoption of Microsoft's Windows Phone operating system. Elop denied the accusations again in an interview in 2014.

In the book The Decline and Fall of Nokia published in 2014, author David J. Cord firmly rejects the idea that Elop was a Trojan Horse. He claims that all of Elop's decisions were logical when they were made, and he also cites the testimony of other Nokia executives who were part of those decision-making processes. Another book published later in 2014 called Operation Elop also refutes the Trojan Horse claims. Its Finnish authors, journalists from Kauppalehti, noted that Elop "made monumental mistakes - but all in good faith."

==== Acquisition by Microsoft ====
In February 2013, Microsoft ex-CEO Steve Ballmer told Risto Siilasmaa and Stephen Elop in Mobile World Congress 2013 that "With selling Windows Phone devices, Microsoft can only get (Windows Phone) software license fees. It absolutely makes nonsense". In March 2013, Ballmer told Risto and Elop that "Microsoft wants to immediately start the negotiations about acquisition of Nokia".

In May 2013, after the two years that he had been granted for the transition to the Windows Phone platform, Elop was pressed by Nokia's shareholders about the lack of results compared to the competitors and the insufficient sales figures to secure the company's survival. During the annual general meeting, several shareholders voiced that they were running out of patience with Elop's efforts in putting Nokia back to the smartphone race. Elop replied that there was no turning back on his decision of adopting Windows Phone, while some analysts criticized Elop for closing doors to alternative strategies and going all-in with Microsoft's operating system. Some analysts speculated that Nokia had already lost the smartphone race to Samsung and Apple, and that if they were to regain their position in the market, it would have to be by means of low-end devices such as the Asha.

In June 2013, it was reported that Microsoft had been to advanced talks for buying Nokia, but the negotiations had faltered over price and worries about Nokia's slumping market position. As of June 2013, Nokia's mobile phone market share had fallen from 23% to 15%, their smartphone market share gone from 32.6% to 3.3%, and their stock value dropped by 85% since Elop's takeover. On 3 September 2013, it was announced that Microsoft had agreed to buy Nokia's mobile phone and devices (Nokia D&S) business for 5.4 billion euros (US$7.2bn; £4.6bn) and that Elop would stand down as Nokia's CEO to become Executive Vice President of the Microsoft Devices Group business unit. On the day's press conference, Elop said Nokia had much to be proud of, saying "We have transitioned through a period of incredible difficulty and we are now delivering the best products we have ever delivered, while simultaneously having changed our culture and the way we work." He also said he felt sadness as it changes what Nokia stands for, but added that Nokia products will become an even stronger competitor together with Microsoft. Elop was said to bring a unique set of skills back to Microsoft, given his varied leadership experience and proven ability to manage products and divisions at the company (i.e. Microsoft Office).

After Elop stepped down as CEO of Nokia, Risto Siilasmaa replaced him as interim CEO before the appointment of Rajeev Suri. Nokia's devices and services business would ultimately become Microsoft Mobile on 25 April 2014.

Despite Nokia's major decline in market share, it continued to be the second largest mobile phone manufacturer overall at the time of the Microsoft sale completion in 2014. This was mostly from sales of its basic feature phones: specifically in the high-profit and competitive smartphone market, Nokia did not make the top eight list of manufacturers.

==== Bonus controversy ====
Controversy arose around Elop receiving a €18.8 million bonus after Nokia sold its mobile phone business to Microsoft and he stepped down as the CEO. The controversy was further fueled after it was revealed that his contract had been revised on the same day as the deal was announced. Moreover, the chairman of Nokia's Board of Directors gave initially incorrect information about the contract to the public, and had to correct his statements later. Shortly before his departure from Nokia, Elop had filed for divorce, which he also cited as a reason to reject a renegotiation of the controversial bonus. He claimed he couldn't afford a reduction of the payoff because his wife would demand half of it. Elop also enjoyed a preferential tax status in Finland, a 35% fixed-rate income tax irrespective of the size of income, while typical tax payers in Finland pay a progressive income tax. Approximately 70% of the bonus costs were absorbed by Microsoft during the acquisition, the majority of which came in the form of accelerated stock awards.

Criticism spread to politics, with Prime Minister of Finland Jyrki Katainen telling Finnish television that the payoff was "quite outrageous", and that it cannot be justified given the country's difficult economic times. Jutta Urpilainen, the minister of finance, wrote on her blog "In addition to the general toxic atmosphere, it [the payoff] may be a threat to social harmony". Some Nokia employees and investors also shared concerns.

==== Falsely reported quote ====
A quote has been attributed to Elop by some online sources claiming that he said, at the end of his speech to the Nokia board following the Microsoft acquisition: "we didn't do anything wrong, but somehow we lost". The claim also mentions that the quote was followed by emotional "tears" from Elop and other Nokia executives who were present. However, Microsoft Azure architect Clemens Vasters published an article on LinkedIn claiming that this is fake and "nonsense", citing the full press conference video that is publicly available on YouTube that does not feature the quote or emotions.

=== Microsoft Devices Group ===
In 2014, Elop returned to Microsoft as executive vice president of the Microsoft Devices Group. From that point, Elop focused on the team's “mandate to help people do more” and their interest in "[putting] the entirety of the Microsoft experience in people's hands." Some major developments from the group included new Nokia, and later Microsoft-branded Lumia smartphones, the launch of new products including Microsoft HoloLens and the Microsoft Band, and the spin out of Nokia MixRadio to Japan's Line Corporation.

On 17 June 2015, Elop was laid off from his position at Microsoft as part of massive job cuts in the Microsoft Devices Group. According to Microsoft CEO Satya Nadella, "Stephen and I have agreed that now is the right time for him to retire from Microsoft. I regret the loss of leadership that this represents, and look forward to seeing where his next destination will be."

=== Telstra ===
On 16 March 2016, Australia's largest telecommunications provider Telstra announced that Elop would be joining the company in a newly created position as Group Executive Technology, Innovation and Strategy.

In his first speech at a Telstra conference in September 2016, Elop cited Nokia as an example of a "great" company that can self-assess and "transform" when necessary, referencing its success as a networks equipment supplier. He said that Telstra was also needing a necessary transformation to become more of a technology company.

Elop was dismissed from Telstra as part of its restructuring on 31 July 2018.

=== APiJET ===
On 17 September 2019, APiJET, a Seattle-based joint venture of Aviation Partners, Inc. and iJet Technologies which makes real-time aircraft data analytics, announced that Elop had been named its CEO.

As of January 2021, Stephen Elop has terminated his assignment as CEO to APiJET, serves on the APiJET board and is senior advisor to APiJET.

=== Nintex ===
As of December 2025, Stephen Elop can be found as the Acting CEO / Chairman of the Board of Nintex. This is after current Nintex CEO Amit Mathradas announced that he’s leaving to take the helm of Five9 beginning on February 2 2026. Mathradas has led Nintex, a Bellevue, Wash.-based workflow automation company, for nearly three years.

== Personal life ==
In an interview, Elop said that he sees his Canadian roots as a "significant source of strength in the world", and he added "I will forever in my life be a Canadian, first and foremost."

In his spare time, Elop is an avid recreational pilot, owning a Cessna CitationJet. Elop is also a fan of the Vancouver Canucks ice hockey team. During his time working for Macromedia and Adobe in the mid-2000s, Elop occupied his weekends with his children.

Elop was married to Nancy from Wyoming, Ontario who he first met when studying at McMaster. They have five children: triplets (two girls and a boy), an adopted Chinese girl, and another boy. In August 2013 he filed for divorce from his wife of 26 years, having been separated since October 2012. Elop listed for sale his US$5 million mansion in Redmond, Washington, U.S., which he purchased in 2008 and lived in with his family. The divorce finalised on 3 July 2014.

Business positions
| Preceded by Olli-Pekka Kallasvuo | CEO of Nokia Corporation; 2010–2013 | Succeeded by Risto Siilasmaa |
