= Jaakko A. Malmivuo =

Finnish engineer, academic, author, and opera singer

- Occupations: Engineer, academic, author and opera singer

Academic background
- Education: MSc., Engineering; Doctor of Technology
- Alma mater: Helsinki University of Technology (now Aalto University)

Jaakko A. Malmivuo is a Finnish engineer, academic, author, and opera singer. He was a professor of Bioelectromagnetism at Tampere University of Technology (TUT) from 1976 to 2010, an adjunct professor in the Faculty of Medicine at the University of Tampere as well as a visiting professor in the Faculty of Electrical Engineering and Computer Science, Electronics, and Medical Signal Processing at Technische Universität Berlin. Moreover, he was a director of the Ragnar Granit Institute at TUT from 1992.

Malmivuo is most known for his work on bioelectromagnetism, primarily focusing on the magnetic field of the heart and brain. Among his authored works are publications in academic journals, including IEEE Transactions on Biomedical Engineering as well as books such as On the Detection of the Magnetic Heart Vector – An Application of the Reciprocity Theorem (doctoral thesis) and the book that he co-authored with Robert Plonsey: Bioelectromagnetism – Principles and Applications of Bioelectric and Biomagnetic Fields.

Malmivuo is an IEEE Life Fellow, a fellow at the International Academy of Medical and Biological Engineering, and a founding fellow at the European Alliance for Medical and Biological Engineering and Science.

He is a founding member of the Finnish Society for Medical Physics and Medical Engineering and the Finnish Brain Research Society. Moreover, he founded the International Society for Bioelectromagnetism and is the founder and editor-in-chief of the first scientific open-access journal on the Internet, the International Journal of Bioelectromagnetism.

== Education ==
Malmivuo completed his MSc in Engineering from Helsinki University of Technology in 1971. In 1973, he obtained a Licentiate of Technology and a Doctor of Technology degree from the same institution in 1976.

== Career ==
Malmivuo's academic career began at Helsinki University of Technology in 1970 as a research assistant and researcher, a position he held until 1972. Subsequently, from 1972 to 1975, he worked as a clinical engineer at Helsinki University Hospital, the First Medical Clinic. From 1974 to 1975, he was an Asla Fulbright Grantee, and from 1975 to 1976 a researcher at Stanford University, California. In 1976, he joined TUT and served as an associate professor of Bioelectromagnetism until 1985. In 1982, he received the Medal of Honor from the university for serving in 1980–1982 as Chairman of the Organizing Committee and Master of Ceremonies in 1982 in the First Solemn Conferment of the Academic Degrees (tohtoripromootio). Concurrently, he served as an acting professor of electronics from 1979 to 1980 and 1984–1985. In 1987, he was promoted to professor of Bioelectromagnetism at TUT, a role he held until his retirement in 2010. Moreover, he also held the position of visiting professor in the Faculty of Electrical Engineering and Computer Science, Electronics, and Medical Signal Processing at Technische Universität Berlin from 2016 until 2020.

From 1978 to 1992, Malmivuo worked as an opera singer (bass) at the Tampere Opera while maintaining academic responsibilities. He served as the president of the Finnish Society for Medical Physics and Medical Engineering from 1987 to 1990 and the President of the International Society for Bioelectromagnetism from 1995 to 1999.

Additionally, he was also the president of the 30th International Congress on Electrocardiology Helsinki in June 2003, which included the Midnight Sun Symposium at Saariselkä, Lapland.

== Research ==
Malmivuo's research is primarily centered on bioelectromagnetism. He has authored and co-authored 700 publications spanning the areas of electrocardiography, electroencephalography, magnetocardiography, and magnetoencephalography, including books, book chapters, and articles in peer-reviewed journals.

=== Patents ===
Malmivuo holds patents on several projects. Along with Sakari Oja and Juha Nousiainen, he developed a device that measures the bioelectric activity of the heart and nervous system by integrating data from both electric and magnetic field measurements generated by their bioelectrical functions. Moreover, he also developed a technique to monitor multiple superconducting quantum interferometers (also known as rf-SQUIDs).

=== Works on bioelectromagnetism ===
In his doctoral thesis titled "On the detection of the magnetic heart vector – An application of the reciprocity theorem", Malmivuo presented research in magnetocardiography, focusing on developing and evaluating lead systems for magnetic heart vector (MHV) detection through complex mathematical models and experimental methods, ultimately providing practical information for clinical applications in diagnosing heart-related conditions. In 1987, he authored the publication "Magnetic Stimulation – Design of a Prototype and Preliminary Clinical Experiments" which highlighted several advantages of magnetic stimulation over electric stimulation. Concentrating on bioelectromagnetism, his 1995 book with Robert Plonsey titled Bioelectromagnetism – Principles and Applications of Bioelectric and Biomagnetic Fields explored the intersection of engineering science and technology with biological cells and tissues that have electrical conductivity and excitability with a focus on theory, practical applications, and the development of new systems. In 2002 it was published on the Internet.

Malmivuo has used the principle of reciprocity to solve problems in bioelectromagnetism. When he started the research for his doctoral thesis at Stanford University in 1976, it was generally believed in two hypotheses that strongly supported the application of biomagnetism. Firstly, based on the Helmholtz theorem: "Since the bioelectric and biomagnetic signals (like ECG and MCG) are independent, one should obtain as much new information from the heart with MCG as has been derived from ECG". However, Malmivuo showed in 1995 that the Helmholtz theorem concerns the distribution of the electric and magnetic measurements' measurement sensitivities (lead fields). The ECG and MCG signals are only partially independent. A more comprehensive set of diagnostic information is obtained from the heart by combining ECG and MCG measurements to electromagnetocardiography, EMCG. Secondly: Since the skull has high electric resistivity, which scatters the measurement sensitivity of the EEG, and since the skull is transparent to magnetic fields, MEG should be able to focus its measurement sensitivity better than EEG. However, Malmivuo calculated the measurement sensitivity distributions of EEG and MEG and concluded that despite the high electric resistivity of the skull, the EEG better focuses its measurement. However, like in MCG, more significant insights into the brain's electric activity are obtained when utilizing both EEG and MEG as EMEG, instead of relying solely on EEG.

Malmivuo found that Magnetic stimulation is much better in brain stimulation since it stimulates the nerves in the scalp much less and makes brain stimulation painless. In his doctoral thesis, Malmivuo developed several lead systems for measuring the MHV. He also described the lead fields, i.e., the measurement sensitivity distributions of these systems. With clinical measurements, Malmivuo et al. demonstrated that all three dipolar ECG and three dipolar MCG leads have approximately similar diagnostic performance.

Malmivuo and his team found that when adding dipolar electric and magnetic leads to the measurement system, the total diagnostic performance increases the less, the more dipolar leads there already are. This behavior is independent of the order in which the electric and magnetic leads are added to the system. The experimental part of these studies was made in Malmivuo's laboratory at TUT, where in 1979, he constructed the first magnetically shielded room in the Nordic countries. The 2x2x2 m3 room is constructed from 45 mm thick aluminum boards and provided with Helmholtz coils, which compensate for the earth's static magnetic field. Its attenuation for 50 Hz magnetic field is 50 dB.

In his early research with William H. Barry and others, he proposed adapting the right-handed coordinate system, commonly used in physical sciences, to clinical electrocardiography and magnetocardiography for a more convenient and mathematically consistent analysis of the electric and magnetic fields produced by the human heart. He also addressed the shortcomings of earlier coordinate systems.

Focusing on the general solution for the application of magnetocardiography, he suggested that vector electro-magnetocardiography (VEMCG), i.e., combining VECG and VMCG leads to VEMCG, offering a diagnostic tool for cardiac conditions, with experimental evidence indicating improved accuracy.

In electric impedance tomography (EIT), Malmivuo and his co-authors demonstrated that the method generally used to construct the impedance tomography image needs to be corrected. Based on the principle of reciprocity.

Concentrating his research efforts on the optimizing of measurement schemes in EIT, he employed computer models to simulate sensitivity distributions for various commonly used measurement methods in EIT, including neighboring, cross, opposite, and adaptive methods. His research findings indicated that the cross and opposite methods provide the highest sensitivities, while the neighboring method is the least sensitive when considering single measurements.

In collaboration with Outi Väisänen, Malmivuo presented a novel multielectrode lead technique for scalp-recorded EEG signals, demonstrating improved signal-to-noise ratio through specific sensitivity distribution for deep brain sources and spatial averaging of noise based on theoretical analysis, simulations, and experimental measurements. Moreover, focusing his research efforts on the diagnosis of cardiac diseases, he provided theoretical and clinical evidence for increasing the number of electric and magnetic leads in medical diagnosis to improve diagnostic performance.

=== Electroencephalography and magnetoencephalography ===
In 1980, Malmivuo conducted a comparative analysis of magnetoencephalography (MEG) and electroencephalography (EEG) regarding their theory and practical applications in detecting bioelectric brain activity, applying reciprocity within the framework of lead field theory to enhance detector design and placement for improved measurement accuracy. His 1987 research with Jouko Puikkonen suggested that multichannel SQUID detectors improve the speed and spatial capabilities of magnetic detection of brain activity (MEG), allowing simultaneous recording from multiple locations and the ability to extract one-dimensional information through channel combinations. Expanding on the historical debate between bioelectric and biomagnetic measurements, his study presented evidence for their interdependence, compared the spatial resolutions of EEG and MEG, and concluded that while they do not offer similar spatial resolutions, recording both methods can provide additional information about brain activity with unique properties for specific applications. However, both MEG and EEG capture brain electric activity in a similar manner when using specific sensor types. Moreover, his joint study with Nevzat G. Gencer and others provided a comprehensive overview encompassing the techniques, obstacles, and unresolved matters pertaining to EEG and MEG source imaging. The paper also underscored the significance of conducting real-time measurements of conductivity on living tissue as a means to enhance both forward and inverse solutions and suggested the importance of meticulously recording details about the measurement setups, particularly concerning moisture and temperature levels. Altogether, he has written and co-written about 700 publications.

== Science parks ==
In the 1970s – 1980s, Malmivuo had several research projects that had industrial potential. He suggested to TUT's rector that a research center in electronics and computer science close to TUT should be established. He repeated the initiative in a seminar on economics at TUT in January 1981. After that, a working group was finally established to build the research center Hermia next to TUT. The first research building was built in 1986. Later, more research buildings were constructed in the area, composing a science park.

In 1989, Malmivuo, with his colleague from the Faculty of Medicine at the University of Tampere, made an initiative to the City of Tampere to build a Biomedical Engineering Research Center near the Tampere University Central Hospital. The building, called Finn-Medi, was completed in 1995. The total number of personnel at Malmivuo's institute was about 40. About half of them moved to the Research Center Finn-Medi. Later, more research buildings were built in the hospital area, composing a science park. There are now seven research buildings.

== Opera singing ==
Malmivuo started his vocal studies and joined the Tampere Opera chorus in 1976; at the same time, he started his professorship at TUT. He studied singing in Finland and Germany. He also participated in the Opera Studio at the Sibelius Academy, Helsinki. He was later invited to sing as a soloist in the Tampere Opera and other operas in Finland. His roles included Il Commendatore (Mozart: Don Giovanni), Angelotti (Puccini: Tosca), Il Frate (Verdi: Don Carlos), Gremin (Tchaikovsky: Eugene Onegin), Bonzo (Puccini: Madama Butterfly), and Sarastro (Mozart: The Magic Flute). In addition to opera roles, he also gave church concerts and sang in several festive occasions in Finland and abroad.

== Ragnar Granit ==
In 1992, Malmivuo began to promote Professor Ragnar Granit as a Finnish Nobel Prize winner. Though he moved to the Carolinian Institute in Stockholm in 1941, he received the Nobel Prize in 1967 in Physiology or Medicine for the work he had done in Finland before moving to Sweden. He could not receive the Prize earlier since he was a member of the Nobel Committee until his retirement.

After Ragnar Granit's death, Malmivuo began to use the name Ragnar Granit Institute for his Institute of Biomedical Engineering. He also established the Ragnar Granit Foundation, the founding members of which were institutions from Finland, Sweden, the UK, and the USA, which were closely connected to Ragnar Granit's life work.

== Awards and honors ==
- 1982 – Medal of Honor, Tampere University of Technology
- 1996 – Finnish Conservative Club of Tampere, "The Ear"
- 2003 – The Plaquette, International Society for Bioelectromagnetism
- 2003 – Fellow, International Academy of Medical and Biological Engineering
- 2008 – Honorary Member, Finnish Society for Medical Physics and Medical Engineering
- 2012 – Founding Fellow, European Alliance for Medical and Biological Engineering & Science
- 2018 – Life Fellow, Institute of Electrical and Electronics Engineers

== Bibliography ==
=== Books ===
- On the detection of the magnetic heart vector – An application of the reciprocity theorem (1976) ISBN 9516660711
- Magnetic stimulation – design of a prototype and preliminary clinical experiments (1987) ISBN 9517211937
- Bioelectromagnetism – Principles and Applications of Bioelectric and Biomagnetic Fields (1995) ISBN 9780195058239

=== Selected articles ===
- Malmivuo, J., Suihko, V., & Eskola, H. (1997). Sensitivity distributions of EEG and MEG measurements. IEEE Transactions on Biomedical Engineering, 44(3), 196–208.
- Puurtinen, M. M., Komulainen, S. M., Kauppinen, P. K., Malmivuo, J. A., & Hyttinen, J. A. (2006, August). Measurement of noise and impedance of dry and wet textile electrodes, and textile electrodes with hydrogel. In 2006 international conference of the IEEE Engineering in Medicine and Biology Society (pp. 6012–6015). IEEE.
- Kauppinen, P., Hyttinen, J., & Malmivuo, J. (2006). Sensitivity distribution visualizations of impedance tomography measurement strategies. International Journal of Bioelectromagnetism, 8(1), 1–9.
- Wendel, K., Väisänen, O., Malmivuo, J., Gencer, N. G., Vanrumste, B., Durka, P., ... & Grave de Peralta Menendez, R. (2009). EEG/MEG source imaging: methods, challenges, and open issues. Computational intelligence and neuroscience, 2009.
- Malmivuo, J. (2012). Comparison of the properties of EEG and MEG in detecting the electric activity of the brain. Brain topography, 25, 1–19.
