= Aalto University School of Chemical Engineering =

- Aalto-yliopiston kemian tekniikan korkeakoulu Aalto-universitetets Högskolan för kemiteknik
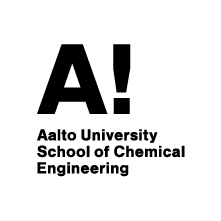
- Established: 1849
- Dean: Kristiina Kruus
- Administrative staff: 454 (2019)
- Students: 1,080 (2019)
- Location: Espoo, Finland
- Campus: Urban, Inner City
- Website: aalto.fi/en/school-of-chemical-engineering

Aalto University School of Chemical Engineering (Finnish: Aalto-yliopiston kemian tekniikan korkeakoulu, Swedish: Aalto-universitetets högskola för kemiteknik) is a part of the Aalto University and one of the four new schools of technology established from the former Aalto University School of Science and Technology on 1 January 2011. The new schools continue to offer education and research that promotes advances in science and technology.

The school teaches and researches sustainable processing and use of natural resources, energy technologies, and new materials, and focuses on the development of environmentally-friendly and energy-efficient processes for the refining of wood, other bio-masses, and inorganic raw materials. Additionally, the School develops new materials and their applications based on these raw materials.

The School of Chemical Engineering combines natural sciences and engineering in a unique way. This allows the results of research to be refined a long way and put into practice as ready products and processes. Each innovation secures both our renewable and non-renewable natural resources for the future.

== Organization and units ==
=== Departments ===
- Department of Bioproducts and Biosystems
- Department of Chemical and Metallurgical Engineering
- Department of Chemistry and Materials Science

=== Other units ===
- Bioeconomy Infrastructure
- RawMatTERS Finland Infrastructure (RAMI)

== Studies ==
The studies and research at the School of Chemical Engineering focus on:

forest industry technology, chemical engineering, industrial biotechnology, materials science and nanotechnology, metal and mineral processing and energy technology. The school offers university degrees in chemical engineering at the bachelor's, master's, licentiate, and doctoral levels.

=== Bachelor's programmes ===
Bachelor's programmes can be studied at the Aalto university School of Chemical Engineering in English and Finnish.

==== Bachelors Programme in Finnish ====
Further information about the Finnish language Bachelor's Programme can be found here https://www.aalto.fi/en/study-options/kemian-tekniikka-tekniikan-kandidaatti-ja-diplomi-insinoori

=== Master’s Programme in Chemical, Biochemical and Materials Engineering ===
The Master’s Programme in Chemical, Biochemical and Materials Engineering has seven majors. When you apply to the Master’s Programme, you apply to one of the majors below:

- Biomass refining
- Biotechnology
- Chemical and Process Engineering
- Chemistry
- Fibre and Polymer Engineering
- Functional Materials
- Sustainable Metals Processing

In all majors in the Master’s Programme in Chemical, Biochemical and Materials Engineering the language of instruction is English. It is also possible to complete some courses in Finnish or Swedish.

You can also accomplish a Master's Degree in a Joint Aalto Master’s Programmes where more than one school is involved or in a Joint international Master's Programme with a European partner university.

=== Aalto Doctoral Programme in Chemical Engineering ===
Further information here: https://www.aalto.fi/en/study-options/aalto-doctoral-programme-in-chemical-engineering
