= Jorma Ollila =

Finnish businessman

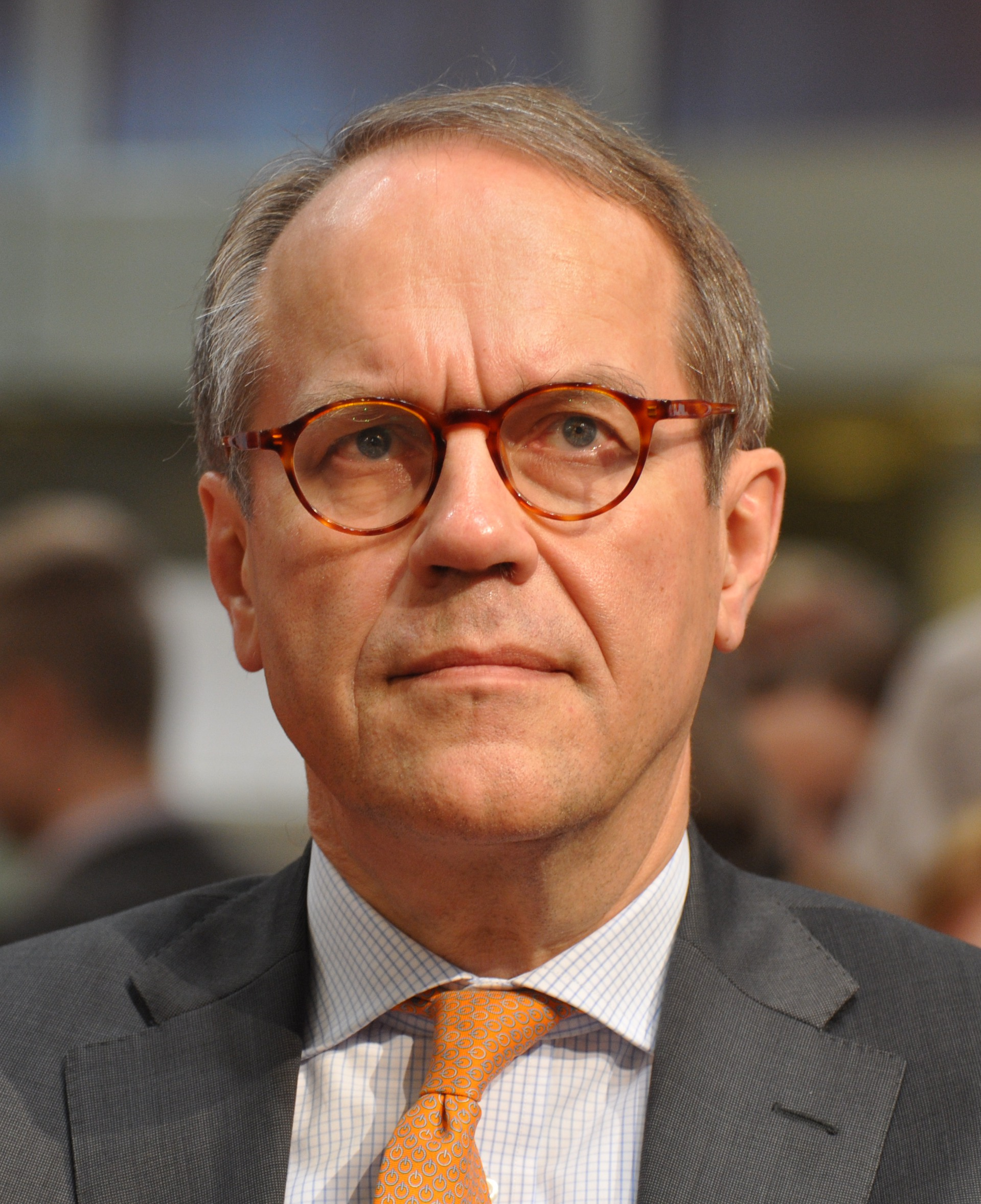
- Ollila in 2013
- Born: Jorma Jaakko Ollila; 15 August 1950 (age 76); Seinäjoki, Finland
- Education: University of Helsinki; London School of Economics; Helsinki University of Technology
- Occupation: Businessman
- Years active: 1973–present
- Title: former chairman of Royal Dutch Shell, former chairman and former CEO of Nokia Corporation
- Term: 2006–2015
- Predecessor: Aad Jacobs
- Successor: Charles O. Holliday (from May 2015)
- Board member of: UPM-Kymmene and Otava Books and Magazines Group Ltd.

Jorma Jaakko Ollila (born 15 August 1950) is a Finnish businessman who was chairman of Royal Dutch Shell from 1 June 2006 to May 2015, and at Nokia Corporation chairman from 1999 to 2012 and CEO from 1992 to 2006. He has been a director of Otava Books and Magazines Group Ltd. since 1996 and UPM-Kymmene since 1997, and an advisory partner at Perella Weinberg Partners, a New York–based boutique investment bank founded by Joseph R. Perella and Peter Weinberg in 2006.

For Nokia, he was credited with turning the company into the then world's largest mobile phone maker.

== Education ==
After elementary school in Kirkon koulu, Kurikka, Finland, Ollila went to high school in Vaasan Lyseon Lukio, Vaasa, with the help of a scholarship at the United World College of the Atlantic, where he earned his 'A' levels.

Thereafter, he obtained a Master of Political Science from University of Helsinki, a Master of Science (Economics) from London School of Economics and a Master of Science (Technology) in Engineering Physics from Helsinki University of Technology.

In 2003, he was elected an honorary fellow of the London School of Economics, and was awarded honorary membership of the Institute of Electrical and Electronics Engineers (IEEE). Ollila has also received honorary doctorates from the University of Helsinki, London School of Economics, Helsinki University of Technology and the University of Vaasa.

Ollila was active in student politics, for example as the chairman of the Finnish association of student unions in 1973 and 1974, and still today participates in Finnish political debate. As a conscript in the Finnish Defence Forces, he received reserve officer training. While attending the Finnish Reserve Officer School he was the chairman of his reserve officer course.

== Career ==
Prior to joining Nokia in 1985, Ollila worked for eight years in corporate banking at Citibank's London and Helsinki offices, and when he joined Nokia his tasks involved international investment deals. A year later, in 1986, Ollila was head of finance during Nokia's renewal under then CEO Kari Kairamo. He was appointed as chief of the mobile phones section in 1990, and CEO two years later in 1992. When Ollila first came to power, the company had suffered from internal disputes and had a financial crisis of a number of years.

As CEO of Nokia he has led the strategy that restructured the former industrial conglomerate into one of the major companies in the mobile phone and telecommunications infrastructure markets.

In 1999, Ollila considered taking part in the Finnish presidential election, following a request from Sauli Niinistö, a member of the National Coalition Party, who was at that time Finnish finance minister and who 12 years later became President of Finland himself. This despite that Ollila belongs to a different party, the Finnish Centre party, which he has been involved with since his activities in student politics at the University of Helsinki.

Ollila was the CEO of Nokia from 1999 to 2006. He was succeeded as CEO by Olli-Pekka Kallasvuo. On 15 September 2010, he announced he intended to step down as Chairman in 2012 and did so on 3 May 2012. He was replaced by Risto Siilasmaa.

Ollila said in a February 2011 interview with Finnish broadcaster Yle that he supported the Nokia-Microsoft partnership initiated by the CEO, Stephen Elop, and predicted the company's fortunes will strongly recover.

In a book published in September 2018 by Nokia chairman Risto Siilasmaa and presented to the Helsingin Sanomat, Ollila's leadership style was strongly criticised and Siilasmaa revealed that the two had fallen out in 2010 (Siilasmaa was a Nokia board member from 2008). Siilasmaa also claims that he believes Ollila played a part in the company's downfall. In response, Ollila claimed that this was exaggerated and not true.

Ollila was chairman of the Research Institute of the Finnish Economy (ETLA), the most reputed economic and social studies think tank in Finland. Between 2005 and 2009, he was chairman of the European Round Table of Industrialists (ERT).

Ollila is the first non-Dutch or non-British person to be the chairman of Shell. He is also the first chairman chosen for this multinational corporation in its new corporate form of Royal Dutch Shell. In October 2014, it was announced that he would be succeeded in May 2015 by the American Charles O. Holliday.

Ollila has been a board member in a number of companies, including Ford Motor Company (2000–2008).

Ollila was the chairman of the Finnish mining and metallurgy company Outokumpu from 2013 until 2018.

=== Others ===
Ollila is a member of the steering committee at the Bilderberg Group. He participated in the 1994 conference and in every Bilderberg conference between 1997 and 2014.

== Energy ==
Shell ended wind power development during the Ollila period. The oil company insists it cannot make the numbers add up to justify offshore windfarms.

== Publications ==
Ollila published his memoirs in Finnish in October 2013. Ollila had recruited four security guards for his book launch event in Helsinki in October 2013. Helsinki police say the protesters or presumed activists were expelled from the book launch. The English translation of his memoirs was published in 2016.

== Bibliography ==
The Decline and Fall of Nokia by David Cord, published in 2014

The Finnish series Mobile 101 combines fiction while tracing the brand's early days in the mobile phone industry. Directed by Maarit Lalli in 2022, and starring Oona Airola, Satu Tuuli Karhu, and Aku Sipola.

== Honours and awards ==
- Honorary Commander of the Civil Division of the Most Excellent Order of the British Empire (CBE) (2008)
- Commander Grand Cross of the Order of the Lion of Finland (2005)
- Beijing Honorary Citizenship (2002), China
- Commander's Cross of the Order of Merit of the Republic of Poland (1999)
- Commander's Cross of the Order of Merit of the Federal Republic of Germany (1997)
- Commander, 1st Class of the Order of the White Rose of Finland (1996)
- Officer's Cross of the Order of Merit of the Republic of Hungary (1996)
- Commander of the Order of Orange-Nassau (1995)
- Order of the White Star Estonia (1995)

== Fines ==
Georg Ehrnrooth and Ollila were fined for Luxembourg investments in 2014. Ollila was fined 3,000 euros by Finnish Financial Supervisory Authority (Fiva) for failing to make a timely disclosure that he owns an investment company called Kestrel SA. The company is based in Luxembourg and was worth 8.2 million euros at the end of 2012. Ollila said that he had mistakenly neglected to disclose of the investment company and had not used the company to hold shares in firms where he has held executive positions.

Business positions
Preceded by Simo Vuorilehto	CEO of Nokia Corporation; 1992–2006	Succeeded by Olli-Pekka Kallasvuo
Preceded by Casimir Ehrnrooth	Chairman of Nokia Corporation; 1999–2012	Succeeded by Risto Siilasmaa
Preceded by Aad Jacobs	Chairman of Royal Dutch Shell; 2006–2015	Succeeded by Charles O. Holliday
