= International Association of Scientific and Technological University Libraries =

Non-governmental forum for libraries

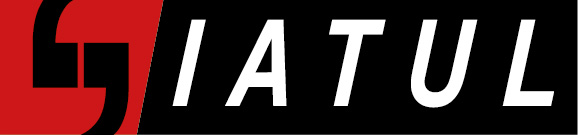
- Logo IATUL
- Abbreviation: IATUL
- Formation: 1955
- Founder: Dr. Hemlin
- Founded at: Düsseldorf, Germany
- Type: Voluntary international non-governmental organisation
- Purpose: Forum for the exchange of ideas relevant to librarianship in technological universities
- Location: Worldwide
- Members: 200

The International Association of Technological University Libraries (IATUL) was founded in Düsseldorf, Germany in May 1955, as an international forum for the exchange of ideas relevant to librarianship in technological universities throughout the world. IATUL is a voluntary international non-governmental organisation of a group of libraries, represented by their library directors or senior managers, who have responsibility for information services and resources management. The expanded name of IATUL was changed to the International Association of Scientific and Technological University Libraries at the 2009 General Assembly to reflect the broader range of institutions which now make up the membership of the association. In 2014, the name was changed to the International Association of University Libraries (IATUL), to include all university libraries.

IATUL is an example of the development of an informal international network between libraries of similar type, with a common level of expertise and offering a similar range of services to their users. Many of the members of IATUL provide services, not only to the teaching and research staff and students of their own university, but also to industrial organizations and national research institutions, in their respective countries.

The main objective of IATUL is to provide a forum where library directors and senior managers can meet to exchange views on matters of current significance and to provide an opportunity for them to develop a collaborative approach to solving problems. IATUL also welcomes organizations who supply services to university libraries into membership, if they wish to be identified with the association’s activities.

IATUL's mission statement is to create a one world library, one that offers a "High quality tertiary education, supported by university-level research that is the key factor in the further development of any part of our knowledge-driven global society".

IATUL also offers numerous services, which include an editing service, international research and study programme, travel grants, and special interest groups.

== History ==
Dr. Hemlin from Chalmers University of Technology, Sweden was the founder of IATUL and also its first President, and in this capacity he did much to develop the Association. In September 1955 IATUL was recognized as a subsection of International Library Association’s division of The International Federation of Library Associations (IFLA).

In the early years many of the members of IATUL came from Europe, where there were a number of well-established institutions for technological education. The eighteenth century had seen the founding of some of the earliest "schools" of this type in France, Germany and Hungary. The first half of the nineteenth century was a period of considerable economic and social growth and development. This period saw the increasing use of steam power for industry, the rapid change from local craft production to factory-based industries, and considerable improvements in communications. These changes led to an increased need for the provision of technical education and training, resulting in the founding of "trades and craft schools" and polytechnic institutions throughout Europe. Similar institutions were founded in the USA. The early members of IATUL came mostly from European universities of technology and from some American institutions. During the last twenty years there has been a steady growth in IATUL members coming from all parts of the world, resulting in a truly international organization.

== Conferences ==
IATUL holds an annual conference, which provides members and other interested professionals with the opportunity to discuss issues facing tertiary education libraries.

The institution also holds workshops, which include an IATUL seminar, director's summit and leadership academy.

== Members ==
IATUL has more than 200 member institutions: http://www.iatul.org/members/

IATUL has a board that consists of a President, Vice President, Secretary, Treasurer and at least four other members. Each position on the board are elected for a term of three years.
