= IslamicTorrents =

- Website type: BitTorrent and P2P search engine
- Owner: Mohamed El-Fatatry
- Creator: Mohamed El-Fatatry
- Registration: Free/Invite
- Launched: 1 August 2005; 21 years ago
- Current status: Offline

IslamicTorrents was a BitTorrent tracker that focused mainly on Islamic and Islam-related materials. Their tracker handled requests and tracks videos, audio files, Islamic lectures, Quran files, Islamic software, books, and particularly documentaries relating to Islam. Previously, the site catered to approximately 40,000 users worldwide and boasted over 900,000 torrents downloaded.

The site was originally started by SysOp m12345 to provide Muslims from various backgrounds and age groups with Islamic content in a free medium. IslamicTorrents was a website under the umbrella of the Digital Halal Islamic portal. The site has been noted to be part of the Digital Halal portal and is known to provide Qur'anic recitations, films of sermons, and documentaries. The site, along with other similar sites, may have led to an increase in the perception of permissiveness and safety of internet use. However, it is also alleged that the site was a target of racism on the internet.

== History ==
- IslamicTorrents originally began as a resource for the Muslim world, including new Muslims.
- As of 1 August 2006, IslamicTorrents entered its second year as a resource for Muslims.
- IslamicTorrents has surpassed all existing Islam-related BitTorrent websites on the internet in terms of size and traffic. IslamicTorrents is ranked in the top 80,000 on the Alexa ranking list of the world's most-frequented internet sites.
- On 26 October 2005, IslamicTorrents.net was given IslamCan.com's highest award. The golden award was granted for excellence as an Islamic website.
- IslamicTorrents.net shut down in January 2012.

== See also ==
- Comparison of BitTorrent sites
