= Enevo =

- Type: Private
- Industry: Waste Management, IoT
- Founded: 2010; 16 years ago
- Headquarters: Boston, MA
- Key people: Fredrik Kekäläinen, CEO & Founder
- Number of employees: 32 (2017)
- Website: www.enevo.com

Enevo is a company that works in data analytics, container asset management, and logistics software for the waste and recycling industry. Enevo was originally founded in Finland in 2010 by Fredrik Kekäläinen and Johan Engström.

== Company history ==
Founded by Fredrik Kekäläinen and Johan Engström in 2010, Enevo was envisioned with the goal of transforming the financial, social and economical impact of waste. Kekäläinen and Engström came up with the concept because they wanted to provide waste data from dumpster sensors to lower the cost of waste disposal.

In April 2013, Enevo raised €2 million (US$2.07 million) in funding from Finnish Industry Investment and Lifeline Ventures. The US subsidiary Enevo, Inc. was opened in July 2013 in Boston, MA. In November 2013, the company signed service contracts with waste management companies in Finland, Norway, and Denmark.

In August 2014, Enevo raised $8 million from Earlybird, Lifeline Ventures, Finnish Industry Investment, Draper Associates and Risto Siilasmaa, among others. The funding would be used to grow and bring the sensor-based waste collection system to new global markets. On 30 June 2015, Enevo secured another $15.8 million in funding from Foxconn, and several other organizations. A year later in August 2016, Enevo received a €15 million loan from the European Investment Bank.

Recycle Track Systems, Inc. announced the takeover of some of Enevo's US waste services accounts in June 2020, as Enevo exited the waste services business and switched focus to continuing the technology and software side of the business. Enevo Oy (the Finland-based parent company and IP holder) filed for voluntary bankruptcy a month later, in what was initially called a group restructuring effort with its creditors. The liquidation of Enevo was completed in May 2021.

Reen AS, a Norway-based spin-off from Europe's second largest telematics company, ABAX Group, acquired part of Enevo's business from the bankruptcy estate. In June 2021, it was announced that while Reen AS would operate from the former Enevo office in Espoo, Finland and the UK branch, the Enevo brand would be retained for its US, Canada and Japan business and continue operating independently as Enevo, Inc. under separate ownership.

In May 2022, Enevo, Inc. acquired the rights to the entire Enevo technology stack along with patents and the Enevo trademark from Reen AS.
