= Helsinki University of Technology =

Former technical university in Finland

Coordinates: 60°11′9″N 024°49′40″E

- Teknillinen korkeakoulu Tekniska högskolan
- Logo of Helsinki University of Technology
- Motto: Labor et scientia (Latin)
- Motto in English: Work and science
- Type: University
- Active: 1849; 177 years ago–2011; 15 years ago
- Location: 1849–1966: Helsinki; 1966–2011: Espoo, Finland
- Campus: Otaniemi
- Website: www.tkk.fi

Helsinki University of Technology (HUT; Finnish: Teknillinen korkeakoulu, TKK; Swedish: Tekniska högskolan) was a technical university in Finland. It was located in Otaniemi, Espoo in the Helsinki metropolitan area, and it was one of the three universities from which the modern day Aalto University was founded. The university was founded in 1849 by Grand Duke of Finland, Emperor Nicholas I and received university status in 1908. It moved from Helsinki to Otaniemi campus area in 1966. The merger of HUT with two other schools created the Aalto University in 2010, and HUT briefly held the name Aalto University School of Science and Technology before being split into four schools in 2011.

Much of the university's Otaniemi campus was designed by Alvar Aalto.

== History ==
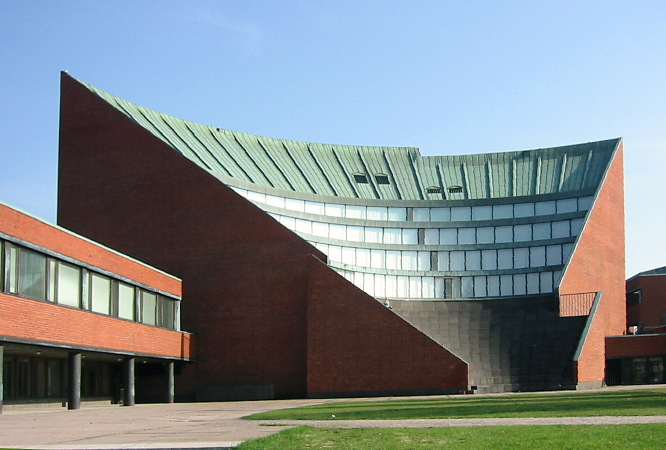
Alvar Aalto's landmark auditorium of the main building. The amphitheatre-like structure contains the main auditoriums, while its exterior can be used for plays and other activities.

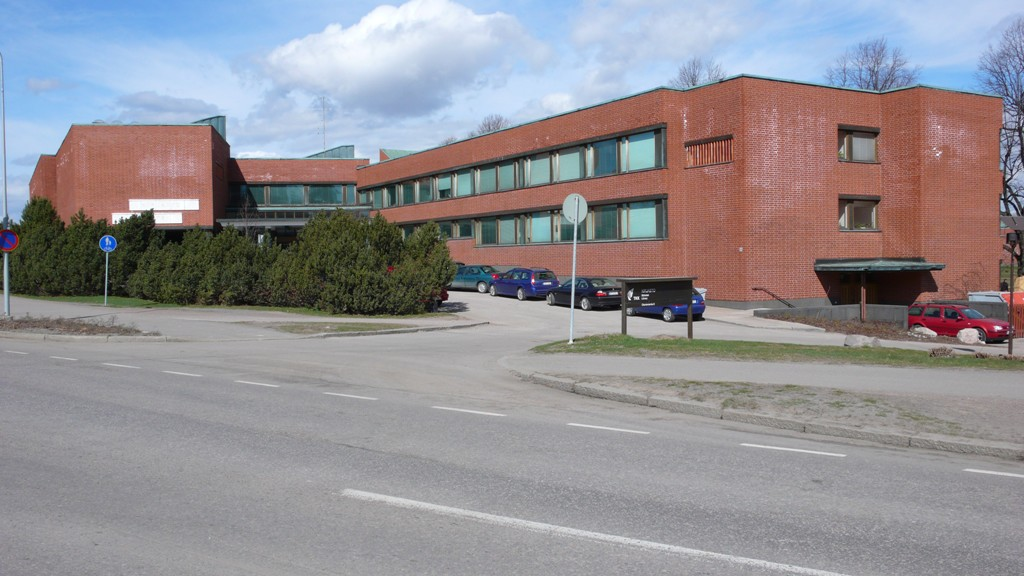
The main library of the university, designed by Alvar Aalto and built in 1970.

In 1849, TKK was established in Helsinki by the decree of the Russian Emperor Nicholas I, Grand Duke of Finland as a "manufacture and handicraft school", with the name Helsingin teknillinen reaalikoulu/Helsingfors tekniska realskola, along with two other similar schools, situated in Vaasa and Turku. The school started its function in the Domus Litonii ("Litonius house") building located at Aleksanterinkatu 50, which had been designed by Gustaf Paulus Leander and completed in 1847, and remains in use and in ownership by the Litonius family to this day.

In 1872, the school's name was changed to Polyteknillinen koulu/Polytekniska skolan ("Polytechnical School") and in 1878, to Polyteknillinen opisto/Polytekniska institutet ("Polytechnical Institute"), while the two other manufacture and handiwork schools were demoted to institutions of lower level. In 1877 the school moved to larger premises to a new building near the Hietalahdentori market square. As the proportion of matriculation diploma holders in the student intake gradually increased, the school gained more social respectability. In 1908, TKK was given university status along with its present name, thus becoming the second university to be founded in Finland. In 1955, building of the new campus area started with the housing village. In 1966, TKK moved from Helsinki to the new campus in Otaniemi, Espoo.

In the past, the university was also known by the abbreviations HUT and TH, from its English- and Swedish-language names, but in 2005 a decision was made officially to use the abbreviation TKK exclusively, for branding reasons.

Logo used in 2010

In 2010, TKK was merged with Helsinki School of Economics and University of Art and Design Helsinki into Aalto University. After brief existence in the new university as own institution, Aalto University School of Science and Technology, it was split into four schools, corresponding to four old faculties, School of Engineering, School of Science, School of Electrical Engineering, and Aalto University School of Chemical Technology. In 2012, the Department of Architecture of the School of Engineering, formerly of Faculty of Engineering and Architecture, was merged with Aalto University School of Art and Design into Aalto University School of Arts, Design and Architecture.

== Research and teaching ==
=== Studies ===
All engineering programmes offered by TKK led to the degree of diplomi-insinööri ("engineer with university diploma"), a five-year master's degree. The only exceptions to this were the architecture programmes that lead to the master's degrees of architecture and landscape architecture. From 2005, according to the Bologna process, all students might also complete an intermediate degree (tekniikan kandidaatti, TkK) before the DI or architect's degree. This degree is considered a bachelor's degree and enables enrollment in foreign universities where a bachelor's degree is required. TKK did not offer programs terminating in a bachelor's degree; a student might only be accepted to study for the Master's level degree. TKK required a bachelor's degree from foreign students studying in English, because only Master's studies were offered completely in English.

Apart from numerous programs in Finnish, various international Masters programs were offered exclusively for studies in English.

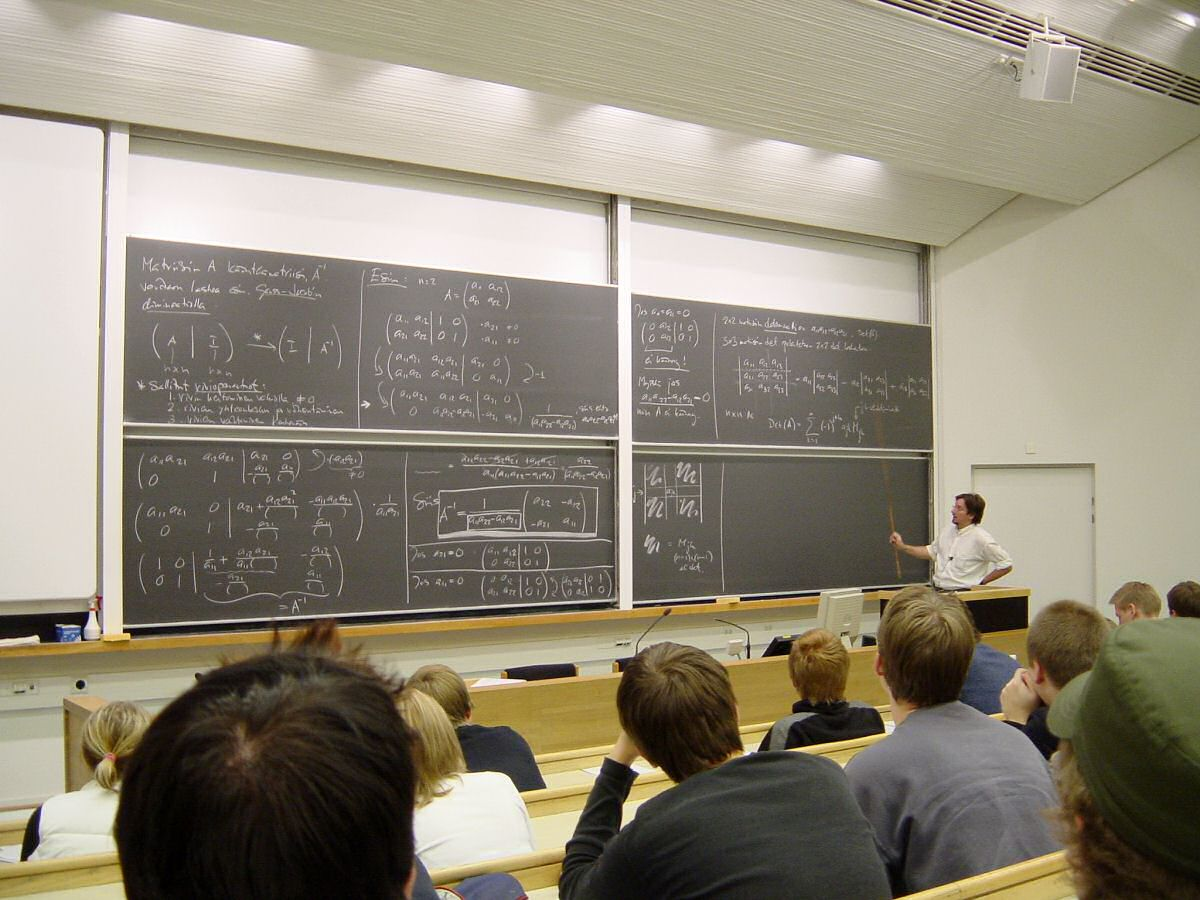
A lecture in mathematics for undergraduates inside the main building.

=== Faculties and research ===
The university was organized in four faculties, each consisting of departments and separate laboratories, and separate units not operating under any faculty.

- Faculty of Chemistry and Materials Sciences, currently Aalto University School of Chemical Technology (Aalto CHEM)
  - Department of Biotechnology and Chemical Technology
  - Department of Chemistry
  - Department of Materials Science and Engineering
  - Department of Forest Products Technology
- Faculty of Electronics, Communications and Automation, currently Aalto University School of Electrical Engineering (Aalto ELEC)
  - Department of Automation and Systems Technology
  - Department of Electronics
  - Department of Micro and Nanosciences
  - Department of Radio Science and Engineering
  - Department of Signal Processing and Acoustics
  - Department of Electrical Engineering
  - Department of Communications and Networking
  - Metsähovi Radio Observatory
- Faculty of Engineering and Architecture, currently split between Aalto University School of Engineering (Aalto ENG) and Aalto University School of Arts, Design and Architecture (Aalto ARTS)
  - Department of Architecture
  - Department of Energy Technology
  - Department of Engineering Design and Production
  - Department of Surveying
  - Department of Structural Engineering and Building Technology
  - Department of Applied Mechanics
  - Department of Civil and Environmental Engineering
  - TKK Lahti Center
  - Centre for Urban and Regional Studies YTK
- Faculty of Information and Natural Sciences, currently Aalto University School of Science (Aalto SCI)
  - Department of Biomedical Engineering and Computational Science
  - Department of Mathematics and Systems Analysis
  - Department of Media Technology
  - Department of Applied Physics
  - Department of Information and Computer Science
  - Department of Computer Science and Engineering
  - Department of Industrial Engineering and Management
  - BIT Research Centre
  - Language Centre
- TKK Main Library
- Lifelong Learning Institute Dipoli
- Low Temperature Laboratory

Additionally, TKK participated in various joint units with other Finnish universities and the VTT Technical Research Centre of Finland:

- Helsinki Institute of Physics (with University of Helsinki)
- Helsinki Institute for Information Technology (with University of Helsinki)
- Micronova Center of Micro and Nanotechnology (with VTT Technical Research Centre of Finland)

TKK participated in 12 Centres of Excellence (huippuyksikkö), selected by the Academy of Finland to represent the top research in the country and receiving separate, fixed-period funding from the Academy.

Researchers at TKK have achieved notability in, among other things, low temperature physics (holding the current world record for the lowest temperature achieved), the development of devices and methods for magnetoencephalography, mobile communications, wood processing, and neural networks, with professor Teuvo Kohonen initiating research in self-organizing maps. Additionally, the first commercialised total synthesis, the synthesis of camphor, was invented by Gustaf Komppa, the first professor of chemistry at TKK and the Nobel laureate (chemistry, 1945) Artturi Virtanen held a professorship in biochemistry at TKK. More recently, the university has notably invested in the research of nanotechnology, operating the largest cleanroom facility in Northern Europe and of the largest microscopy clusters in Europe.

The Nokia Research Center has operated a "lablet" on university premises since 2008, in order to establish joint research programs and daily interaction between Nokia and university researchers, who would share the same facilities.

=== Campus ===
TKK was located in Otaniemi, Espoo. Several high-tech companies, the Finnish forest industry's joint experimental laboratory KCL, and business incubators Innopoli and Technopolis are also situated there. It is also directly adjacent to Keilaniemi, with Life Science Center and the headquarters of several notable Finnish companies, such as Nokia and Fortum. The area is connected by a 15-minute bus ride to the center of Helsinki.

== Culture and student life ==
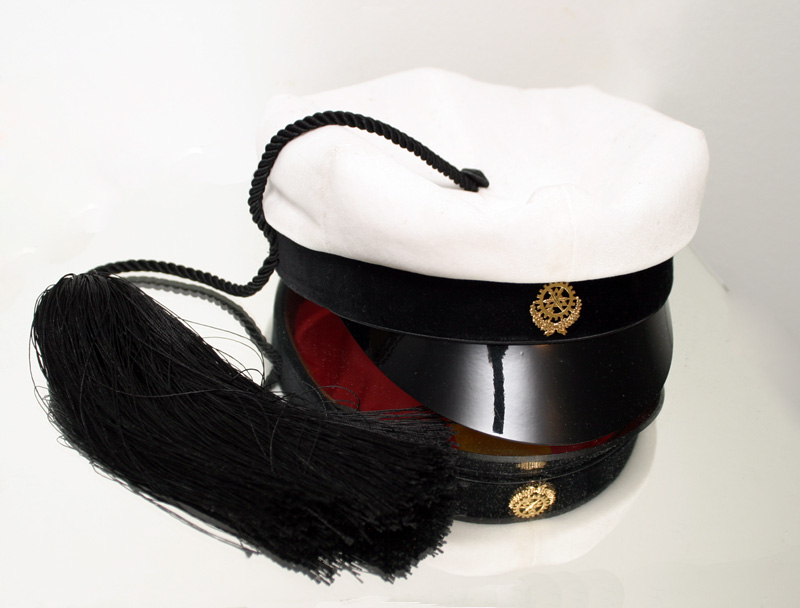
A traditional Finnish technology student's hat (teekkarilakki), the TKK(TF) type, photographed on top of a mirror.

TKK was known for its active student community and technology students (teekkaris) are highly noticeable, as they wear a distinctive hat and often brightly colored overalls to many of their public events. The community has also organised important charity events (tempaus in local language). TKK students are also famous for, and Finland's leading practitioners of, student pranks (jäynä), similar in principle to MIT hacks. Their most widely publicised stunt took place in 1961, when a team of students smuggled a statue of Paavo Nurmi onto the 300-year-old wreck of Regalskeppet Vasa just days before its lifting from the bottom of the sea.

=== Student Union ===
The Student Union of Helsinki University of Technology (TKY, Finnish: Teknillisen korkeakoulun ylioppilaskunta, Swedish: Tekniska högskolans studentkår) was the interest group for the students of the university. In 2006 it had 11,187 members, which included all the students of the university, as is stipulated by Finnish law. It was founded in 1872.

=== Student Nation ===
TKK was also one of the two universities in Finland to host one or more nations, a Finnish type of student corporation. The only nation at TKK was Teknologföreningen (TF) and its goal was to unite Swedish-speaking students at TKK. Teknologföreningen was founded in 1872, prior to the student union. Teknologföreningen also has its own building opposite to Dipoli called Urdsgjallar, completed in 1966. The Finnish-speaking student nation Tekniikan Ylioppilaat was disbanded in 1972 and its functions given to the university student union, since a separate Finnish-speaking nation in a university with an overwhelming Finnish-speaking majority was considered unnecessary. The regional Finnish-speaking nations at the University of Helsinki also accepted TKK students as members.

=== Student housing ===
The housing area of Otaniemi campus, known as Teekkarikylä (technology student village), was owned mostly by the student union and partly by HOAS (Helsinki Student Housing Fund). The housing was characterised by the presence of foreign students of many nationalities. As of 2005, the village offered housing for approximately 2,600 students.

Construction of the Otaniemi campus was started in 1950, in order for the first buildings to host the athletes of the 1952 Summer Olympics in Helsinki. Some of the building material originally used for the campus was acquired from the former Soviet Union embassy, which had been destroyed during World War II, as a result of bombings by Soviet Union itself. Later the student housing has been used for housing athletes again in a number of athletics events, sometimes to the dismay of the students that have to move out during the events. The quality of the Otaniemi student housing holds a high standard in international comparison.

The campus contains the former student union building and convention centre Dipoli, named as the second Poli, the second building of the polytechnic students. The original first building being located formerly in the Helsinki centre. Dipoli was designed by Reima and Raili Pietilä and was completed in 1966. However, in 1993 the building was transformed into a training centre of the university. The ownership of the property was later transferred from the student union to the university itself, due to high maintenance costs. It is regularly used for conventions, congresses and student parties.

=== Associations ===
In addition to the student union TKK students have formed numerous associations for studies, cultural activity and sports. In 2007, there were some 150 associations maintained by university students. In 2006, two-thirds of the student union members were members of "the guilds", which are student associations uniting students inside their department, e.g. the Guild of Electrical Engineers.

==== List of student associations of Helsinki University of Technology ====
Currently this list includes only the associations known to have English Wikipedia articles.

- The Polytech Choir
- Polyteknikkojen Ilmailukerho (Flying club)

== Notable people and alumni ==
- Veikko Aleksanteri Heiskanen (23 July 1895, in Kangaslampi – 23 October 1971, in Helsinki) Finnish geodesist. In 1931–1949, Heiskanen was Professor of Geodesy, Helsinki University of Technology.
- Kai Hietarinta (born 1932) – Finnish businessman and ice hockey executive (M.Sc.)
- Reino Antero Hirvonen (1908–1989) Finnish physical geodesist, also well known for contributions in mathematical and astronomical geodesy.
- Hjalmar Mellin, professor of mathematics, rector (1904–1907)
- Gunnar Nordström, professor of physics
- Gustaf Komppa, professor of chemistry
- Artturi Virtanen, professor of biochemistry, Nobel laureate (Chemistry, 1945)
- Olli Lounasmaa, professor of physics
- Teuvo Kohonen, professor emeritus of computer science, neural networks pioneer
- Kaisa Nyberg, professor of computer science, cryptologist
- Raimo P. Hämäläinen, professor of applied mathematics and operations research
- Esa Saarinen, professor of applied philosophy
- Alvar Aalto (1898–1976), architect (M.Sc. 1921)
- Eliel Saarinen (1873–1950), architect, father of Eero Saarinen
- Jorma Rissanen, information theorist (D.Sc.)
- Risto Siilasmaa, founder and Chairman of F-Secure (M.Sc.)
- Jorma Ollila, Chairman of Royal Dutch Shell and Nokia, Restructurer of Nokia as CEO (M.Sc.)
- Matti Alahuhta, CEO of Kone (D.Sc.)
- Mårten Mickos, former CEO of MySQL (M.Sc.)
- Jyrki Kasvi, MP (D.Sc.)
- Satu Hassi, MEP, former MP and minister (Lic.Sc.)
- Antti Tuuri, writer, (M.Sc)
- Jaakko A. Malmivuo, engineer, (M.Sc)
- Marjo Matikainen-Kallström, MP and olympic gold medalist, (M.Sc)
- Tuomas Sandholm, Professor at Carnegie Mellon University in the Computer Science Department
- Elin Törnudd (1924–2008), Finnish chief librarian and professor
- Pekka Lundmark, CEO of Nokia
- Kaj Himberg (1844–1927), polymath, professor of thermodynamics
