= Muxlim =

Website

Muxlim, Inc.
- Company type: Osakeyhtiö
- Website type: Social network service, marketing gateway service
- Available in: English
- Founded: Helsinki, Finland
- Area served: Worldwide, Muslim world
- Founders: Mohamed El-Fatatry; Pietari Päivänen
- Key people: Mohamed El-Fatatry (CEO); Tariq Khan (President); Stephen Lee (COO); Tuomas Tahvanainen (CFO)
- Employees: 7
- Website: muxlim.com (redirected link), Muxlim Advisory
- Advertising: Banner ads, referral marketing
- Launched: 2006
- Current status: Defunct

Muxlim was primarily known as a social networking website for Muslims that was focused on lifestyle aspects of the community. Founded in 2006 by Mohamed El-Fatatry and Pietari Päivänen of Finland, the company was created as a Muslim lifestyle social media network with primary focus on Muslims in Muslim-minority countries.

When the social network did not develop as planned, the company shifted its focus to provide marketing gateway services to the global Muslim consumer market, utilizing Muxlim.com as a launch pad for marketing messages by global companies.

In February 2010, the company received the Tasavallan Presidentin kansainvälistymispalkinto (in English: The Internationalization Award of the President of Finland).

In February 2012, Muxlim effectively shut down its social network services, as well as its Muxlim advisory services. This came after years of monetary losses. It is reported from the company's most recent financial reports that Muxlim's income was approximately 46,000 Euros while employer costs alone amounted to 300,000 Euros, with a total net loss for the year amounting to 865,000 Euros. In 2009 there was a recorded loss of 700,000 Euros. This came after an influx of investments jump-starting the company, in 2007 receiving US$2 million from Rite Internet Ventures, and was soon looking for more investments

The Muxlim domain, as well as other services provided by the company such as IslamicTorrents.net, redirect to a promotional landing page for the founder's authorised biography. There has yet to be an official announcement regarding the fate of Muxlim.
