= Efecte =

Finnish software company

Efecte Plc
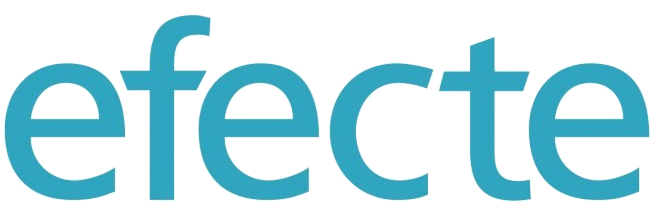
- Native name: Matrix42 Oy
- Industry: Software as a service
- Founded: 1998
- Founders: Jaan Apajalahti; Jussi Sarkkinen; Kristian Jaakkola
- Headquarters: Espoo, Finland
- Area served: Nordics, DACH, Poland, Spain
- Key people: Niilo Fredrikson (CEO)
- Revenue: EUR 21.6 million (2022)
- Number of employees: 110+
- Website: www.efecte.com

Efecte Plc (natively Matrix42 Oy, previously Efecte Oyj) is a Finnish software company founded in 1998. Since 2024, it has been owned by Matrix42.

Efecte develops software for managing IT operations. In the Nordic countries the company is specialized in self-service, service management, and identity management. Nordic customers include SSAB, Roskilde Municipality, Danske Bank, and Stena Sphere. The company says other customers are companies such as Konecranes, Patria, DNA Oy, VR Group, Paulig, and Finnish cities Helsinki, Vantaa, Espoo, and Tampere.

The company employs over 100 people in four countries: Finland, Sweden, Denmark, and Germany. It is headquartered in Espoo, Finland, and its CEO is Niilo Fredrikson.

In the Technology Fast 50 ranking published by Deloitte & Touche, Efecte ranked among the fastest growing Finnish technology companies in 2005, 2006, 2007 and 2008, making the top 10 list in 2005. In 2005, Efecte was also ranked as the 216th fastest growing technology company across EMEA. In 2008, Efecte ranked 9th in Best Workplaces in Finland study conducted by Great Place to Work Institute.

In May 2022, Efecte announced the acquisition of a Polish SaaS company. InteliWise had focused on automating conversations using artificial intelligence. The deal was finalized in July.

In April 2024, Efecte was merged into German ESM company Matrix42 GmbH.
