= Olli-Pekka Kallasvuo =

Finnish businessman

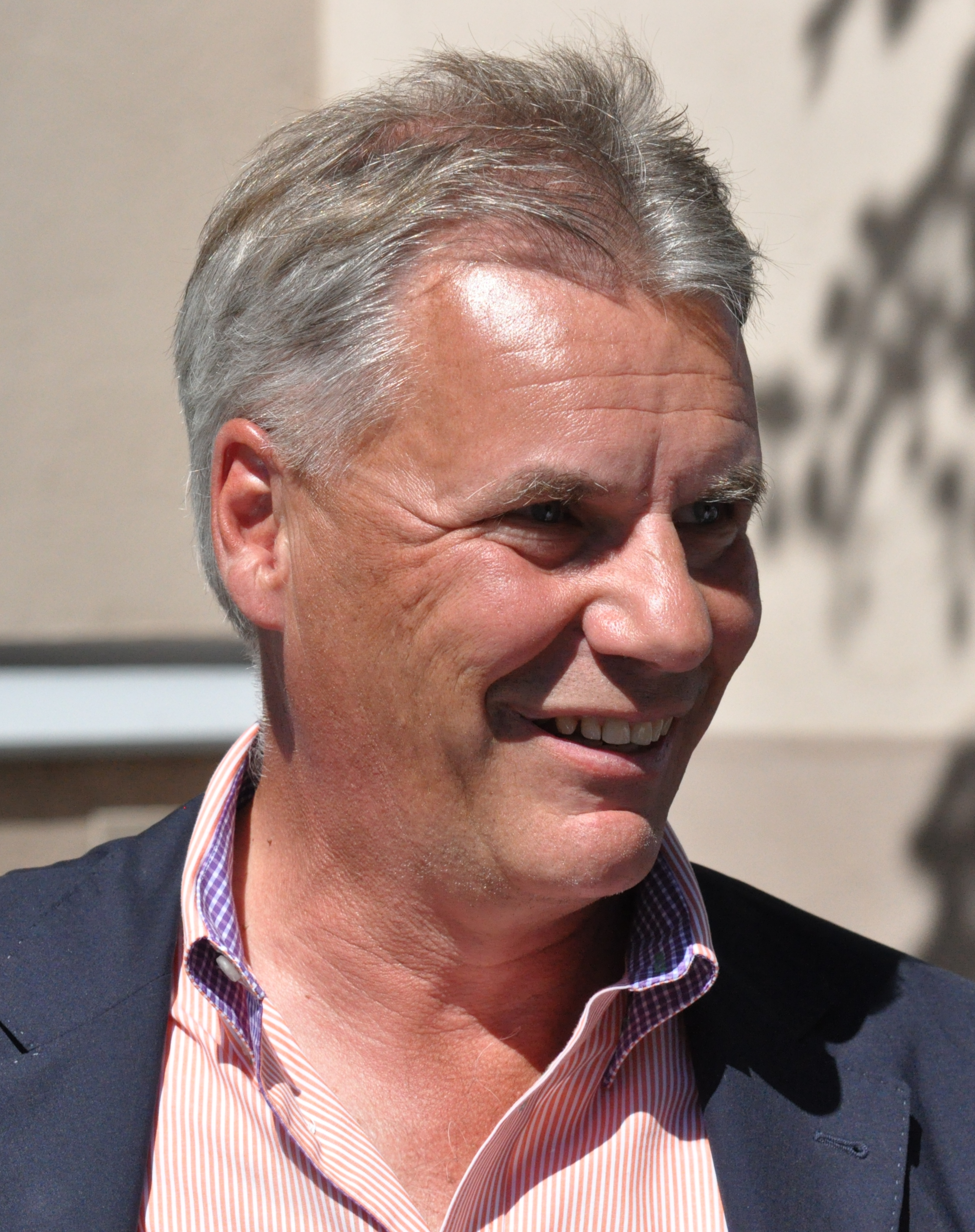
- Born: 13 July 1953 (age 73); Lavia, Finland
- Occupation: Chairman of the board of Cinia Oy

Olli-Pekka Kallasvuo (born 13 July 1953) is a Finnish businessman who is the chairman of Cinia Oy, chaired the committee for World Design Capital Helsinki 2012, and is the former chairman, chief executive officer and president of Nokia, as well as a former board member of Nokia Siemens Networks.

== Career ==
Prior to joining Nokia, Kallasvuo held a variety of positions with the former Union Bank of Finland.

Kallasvuo's involvement with Nokia began in 1980 when he was appointed as corporate counsel. In 1987 he was appointed assistant vice president, Legal Department, and in 1988 he was named assistant vice president, finance. In 1990 he was promoted to senior vice president, finance. From 1990 onward Kallasvuo was a member of the group executive board of Nokia.

In 1992, Kallasvuo was named executive vice president and chief financial officer. In 1997-1998 he was corporate executive vice president, Nokia United States, during which period he held overall responsibility for Nokia's business operations in the US. In early 1999, he returned to the position of chief financial officer, the position he had held prior to moving to the United States. From 2004-2005 Kallasvuo was executive vice president and general manager of Mobile Phones. On 1 October 2005 he was named president and COO. He then replaced Jorma Ollila and was president and chief executive officer of Nokia Corporation from 1 June 2006 until he was fired from his post on 11 September 2010. Chairman Ollila said the "time is right" for a new leader with different skills. His successor was Stephen Elop who began 10 days later. Kallasvuo continued to chair the board for Nokia Siemens Networks.

During Kallasvuo's term as CEO, Nokia's share of the smartphone market fell from 48% in 2006 to 31% by his departure in late 2010 (according to Financial Times figures -). During this period, Nokia's management failed to respond to the rapidly changing environment of the smartphone and wider mobile market, with the lack of platform and UI development contributing to the decline. Under Kallasvuo's management, Nokia acquired Navteq and established Nokia Ovi, but it's still difficult to compete with Apple, Google, Microsoft, Samsung and HTC. The slow pace of development and weak support of the company's own Maemo OS, subsequently known as Meego and featured on the N900 and N9 handsets, left the company with no platform to compete with Apple's iPhone or Google's Android platforms, with key partner Intel abandoning the Meego project in 2011 shortly after Kallasvuo's departure from Nokia. Kallasvuo's successor, Elop, turned to the Windows Phone platform with little commercial success and Nokia fell from the world's largest mobile manufacturer to a minor brand with less than 3% of the smartphone market when its mobile phone division was bought out by Microsoft in mid 2014.

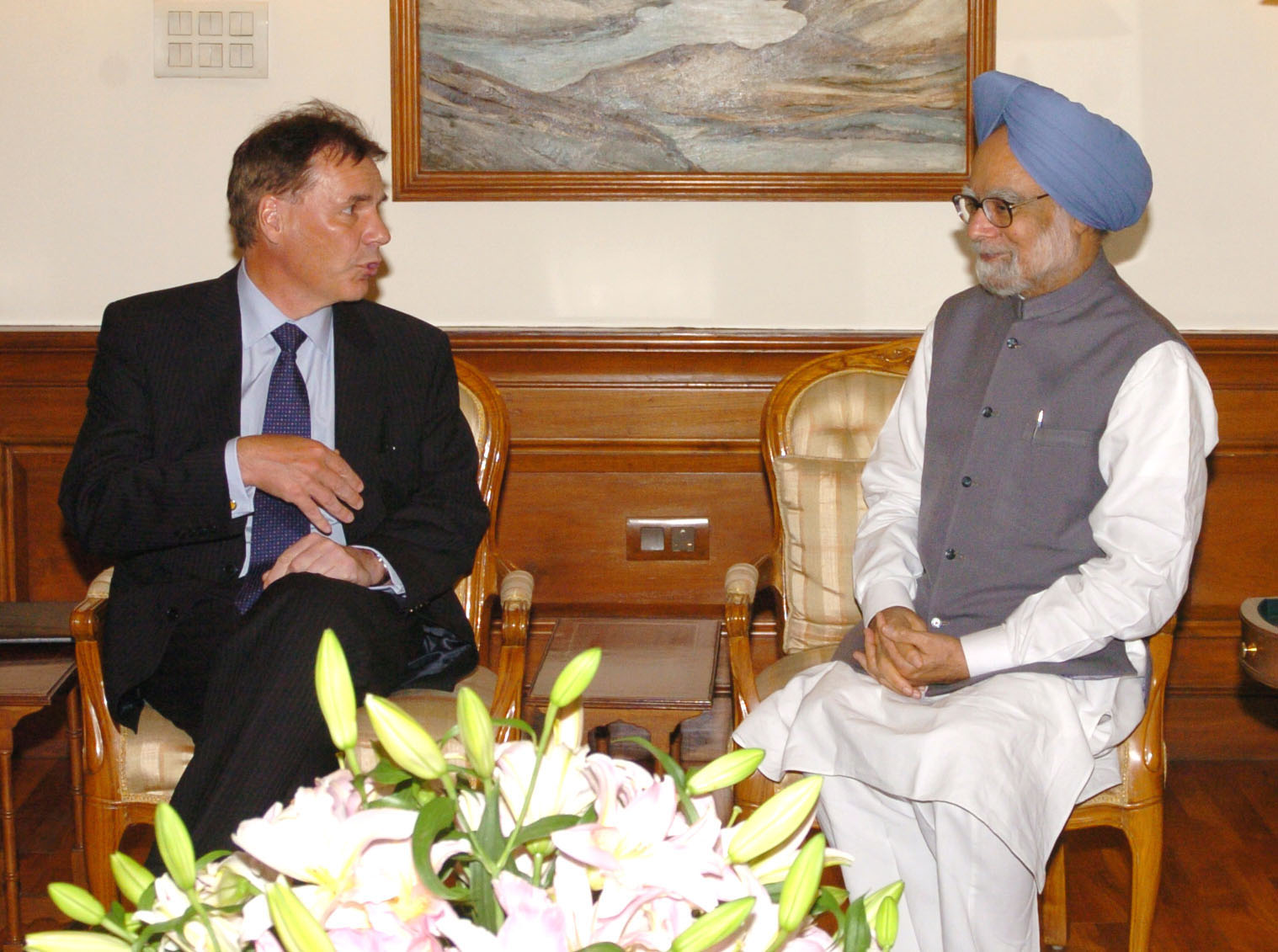
Kallasvuo meeting with Indian Prime Minister Manmohan Singh on 26 June 2008

In addition to his duties for Nokia he was a director of EMC Corporation from August 2004 to 23 January 2009.

On 26 January 2012 the TeliaSonera committee proposed that Olli-Pekka Kallasvuo be elected as a new member of the TeliaSonera's board of directors.

In January 2013, it was announced that Kallasvuo was the new chairman of the board for Zenterio AB, a Swedish TV software company. Zenterio AB declared bankruptcy in July 2019 and in February 2020, Kallasvuo was sued in court for the amount of 44 million Swedish crowns for his actions as chairman of Zenterio.

== Education ==
Kallasvuo holds a master's degree in law (LL.M.) from the University of Helsinki.

== Personal life ==
Kallasvuo was born in Lavia, Finland. He is married to Ursula Ranin, a lawyer formerly working for Nokia. From his previous marriage to Anita Kallasvuo he has two adult children; Jussi and Anu Kallasvuo.

== Sources ==
- KALLASVUO Olli-Pekka International Who's Who. accessed September 4, 2006.

Business positions
Preceded by Jorma Ollila	CEO of Nokia Corporation; 2006–2010	Succeeded by Stephen Elop
