= F-Secure =

Finnish cyber security company

F-Secure Corporation
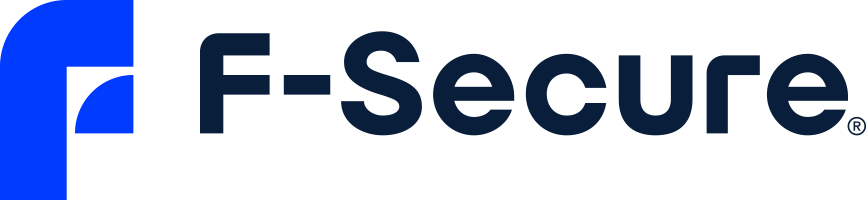
- Type: Public
- Traded as: Nasdaq Helsinki: FSECURE
- Industry: Computer software
- Founded: 16 May 1988 (as Data Fellows); 1999 (as F-Secure)
- Founder: Petri Allas; Risto Siilasmaa
- Headquarters: Helsinki, Finland
- Key people: Pertti Ervi, chair; Timo Laaksonen, CEO; Mikko Hyppönen, Principal Research Advisor
- Products: Cybersecurity software
- Services: Computer security
- Revenue: ▼€145.7 million (2025)
- Operating income: ▼€35.5 million (2025)
- Total assets: ▼€261.1 million (2025)
- Total equity: ▲€24.8 million (2022)
- Number of employees: 549 (2025)
- Website: f-secure.com

F-Secure Corporation is a Finnish global cyber security and privacy company, which has its headquarters in Helsinki, Finland. F-Secure develops and sells antivirus, VPN, password management, and other consumer cyber security products and services for computers, mobile devices, smart TVs and internet of things devices. The company also offers several free-to-use tools on its website.

In 2022, F-Secure announced a demerger of its corporate and consumer businesses: the corporate business branch was renamed to WithSecure.

== History ==
F-Secure was first established under the name Data Fellows by Petri Allas and Risto Siilasmaa on 16 May 1988. Data Fellows trained computer users and built customized databases. Three years later, the company launched its first major software project and developed the first heuristic scanner for antivirus products. F-Secure’s first antivirus product for Windows PCs was launched in 1994. Data Fellows became F-Secure in 1999. F-Secure was the first company that developed an anti-rootkit technology called BlackLight in 2005.

In June 2015, F-Secure expanded into the enterprise market by acquiring nSense, a Danish company that specialized in security consultation and vulnerability assessment. The purchase followed of Inverse Path, a privately owned Italian security consultancy with experience in avionics, automotive, and industrial control sectors.

F-Secure Client Security received the AV-TEST Best Protection award for the fifth time in 2016.

In June 2018, F-Secure acquired security company MWR InfoSecurity for £80 million ($106 million). F-Secure gained the MWR consulting business (now F-Secure Consulting), its threat hunting product Countercept (now F-Secure Managed Detection and Response), and its suite of phishing protection services, phishd.

On 17 February 2022 F-Secure announced a demerger of its corporate and consumer businesses. In conjunction with the demerger, the company was renamed as WithSecure Corporation. The consumer security business was to be transferred into a new independent company and continue using the name F-Secure Corporation. The demerger came into effect 1 July 2022, when F-Secure was listed on Nasdaq Helsinki and the corporate business was completely separated from the company.

== See also ==
- Internet security
