= Rajeev Suri =

Singaporean business executive (born 1967)

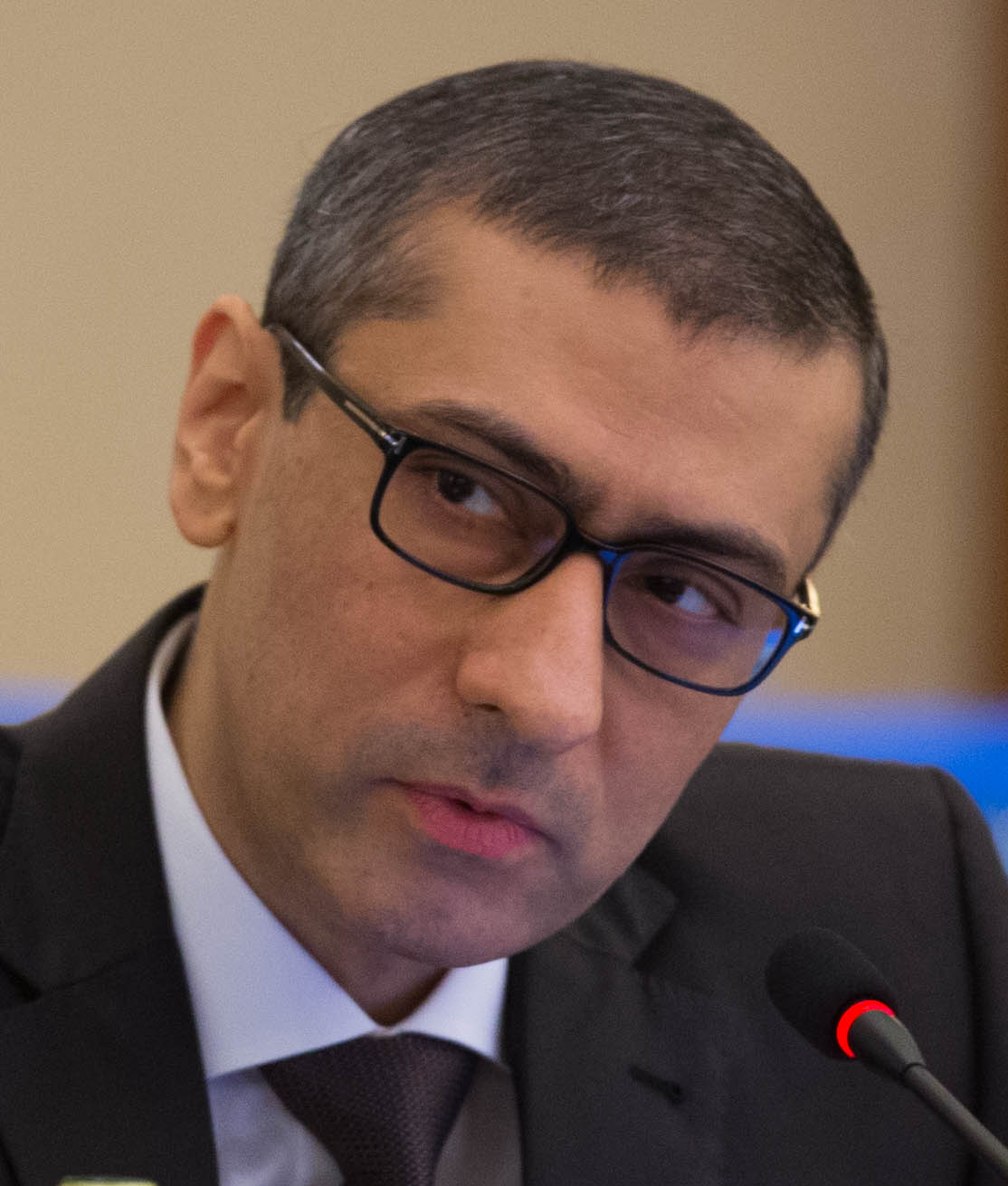
- Suri in 2016
- Born: 10 October 1967 (age 58); New Delhi, India
- Citizenship: Singaporean
- Education: Manipal Institute of Technology (BE)
- Title: Chairman, Digicel Group
- Spouse: Nina Suri (m. 1992)
- Children: 2

Rajeev Suri (born 10 October 1967) is an Indian born Singaporean business executive. He has been the chairman of Digicel Group since November 2023. Prior to this, Suri was the CEO of Inmarsat from February 2021. From April 2014 to July 2020, Suri was the CEO of Nokia. Rajeev currently serves as the Chairman of M-KOPA. Before that, he was CEO of Nokia Solutions and Networks from 2009. Suri held various positions within Nokia since 1995.

== Early life ==
Rajeev Suri was born on 10 October 1967 in New Delhi, India, and was raised in Kuwait and completed his schooling from The Indian Community School Kuwait. He is a Singaporean citizen. Suri has a bachelor of engineering degree in electronics and communications from Manipal Institute of Technology, which was then affiliated to Mangalore University.

== Career ==
Suri joined Nokia in 1995. He followed Simon Beresford-Wylie as the CEO of NSN in October 2009 after Nokia Networks and Siemens Networks was merged.

In April 2014, Suri was appointed as the CEO of Nokia.

In March 2020, it was announced that Suri would step down as CEO of Nokia. He was replaced by Pekka Lundmark in August 2020.

On 24 February 2021, Suri was appointed as the CEO of Inmarsat, replacing Rupert Pearce.

On 29 November 2023, Suri was appointed as the new Chairman of Digicel Group.

On 1 December 2024, Suri was appointed as the new Chairman of M-KOPA.

== Personal life ==
Suri is based in Singapore and London. He is married to Nina Alag Suri, a businesswoman and the founder and CEO of Singaporean startup X0pa.ai. They have two sons.

Business positions
Preceded by Risto Siilasmaa as interim CEO	CEO of Nokia Corporation; 2014–2020	Succeeded by Pekka Lundmark
Preceded by Simon Beresford-Wylie	CEO of Nokia Solutions and Networks; 2009–2020	Succeeded by Pekka Lundmark
