= Pure (company) =

British consumer electronics company

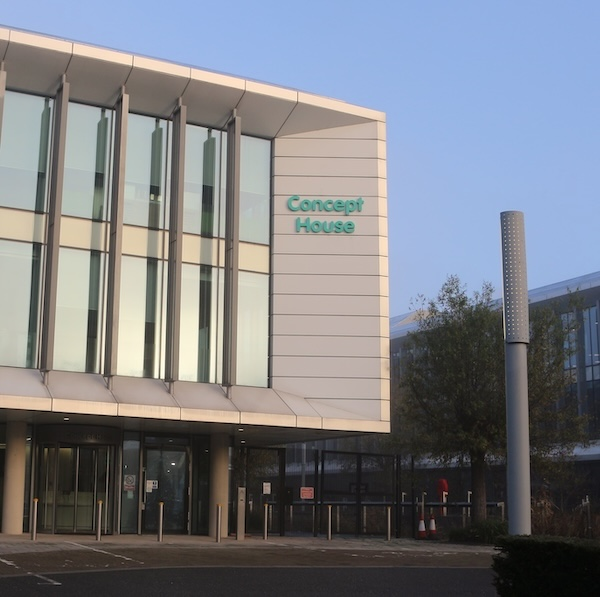
- Office in Kings Langley, UK
- Industry: Consumer electronics
- Predecessor: VideoLogic
- Founded: 2002
- Headquarters: Kings Langley, Hertfordshire, United Kingdom
- Area served: Europe; Australia
- Owner: AVenture AT
- Website: pure-audio.com

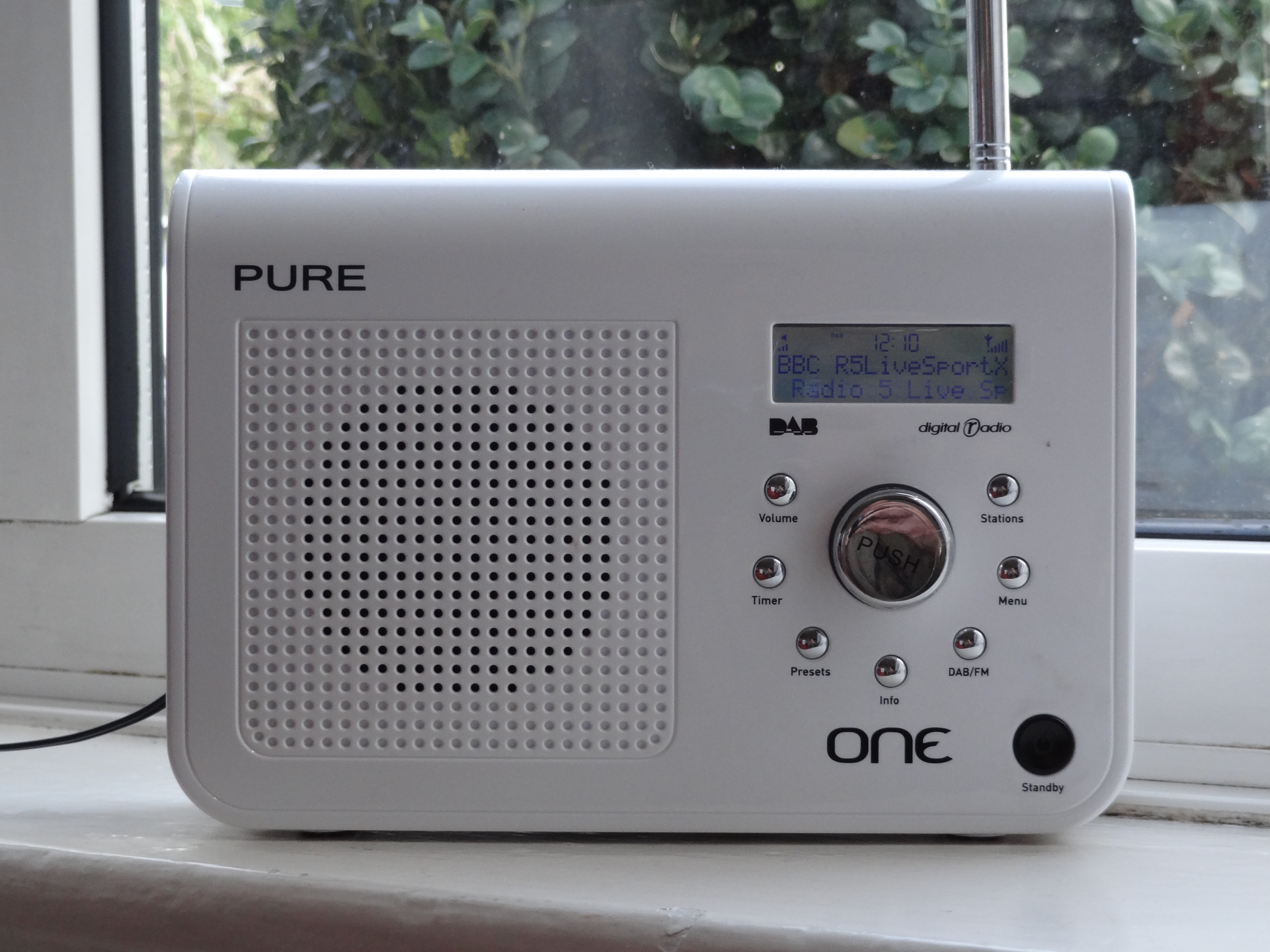
A PURE ONE digital radio receiver

Pure International Ltd., formerly Pure Digital and stylised PURE, is a British consumer electronics company focused on audio, based in Kings Langley. Founded in 2002, they are best known for designing and manufacturing DAB and DAB+ digital radios, having been considered a pioneer of digital radio. In recent years the company has diversified with more broad-based audio products in the radio, Bluetooth and wireless speaker market. Pure also produces audio products under the Braun brand under license.

== Launch and company history ==
The original PURE logo

The Pure brand was launched in October 2001 by VideoLogic Systems, a subsidiary of Imagination Technologies which primarily designed central processing units and graphics processing units. This first product was the Pure DRX-601EX, which was claimed as the "world's first portable digital radio". This receiver had a retro style visually appealing design, although it was priced high at £499. Imagination did not originally set out to sell consumer electronics and the first Pure radio was merely a demonstration platform for its DAB decoding chip. Imagination's then CEO, Hossein Yassaie, was later knighted for his "services to technology and innovation" in 2013.

Following a highly successful market trial between VideoLogic and the Digital Radio Development Bureau, the company worked on building the first mass market sub-£100 DAB receiver. This was released on 31 July 2002, the Pure Evoke-1, a portable kitchen radio with a wooden style medium-density fibreboard case and 60s style speaker grille. Concurrently, VideoLogic renamed itself to Pure Digital. The Evoke-1 sold out within three hours of launch, and during the remainder of the year Pure Digital struggled to meet demands due to high popularity. It helped take off DAB digital radio in the UK.

Second Pure logo used until 2023

Pure celebrated its tenth anniversary in 2012 with a brand revamp. The company had been losing money after 2009. Parent company Imagination Technologies sold Pure in September 2016 to Austrian investment company AVenture AT for a sum of £2.6 million. It also resulted in the renaming of Pure Digital to Pure International.

Pure acquired the license for Braun Audio from Braun, a division of Procter & Gamble. In 2019 Pure launched the Braun Audio range of design speakers, referencing the LE1 speakers designed by u7656ut.

== Products ==
=== Evoke ===
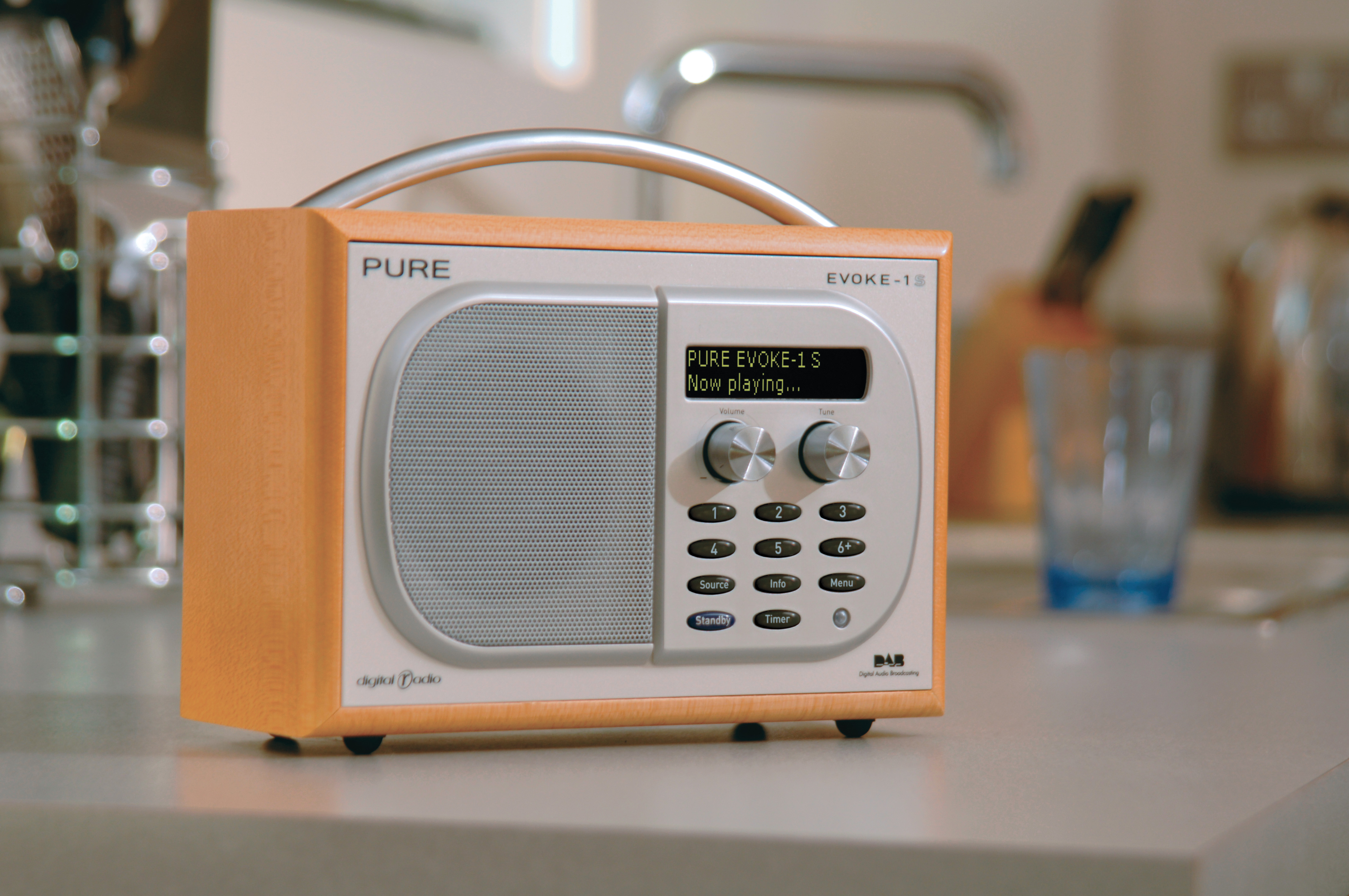
Pure Evoke-1S, an updated version of the original Evoke with its signature wooden style case

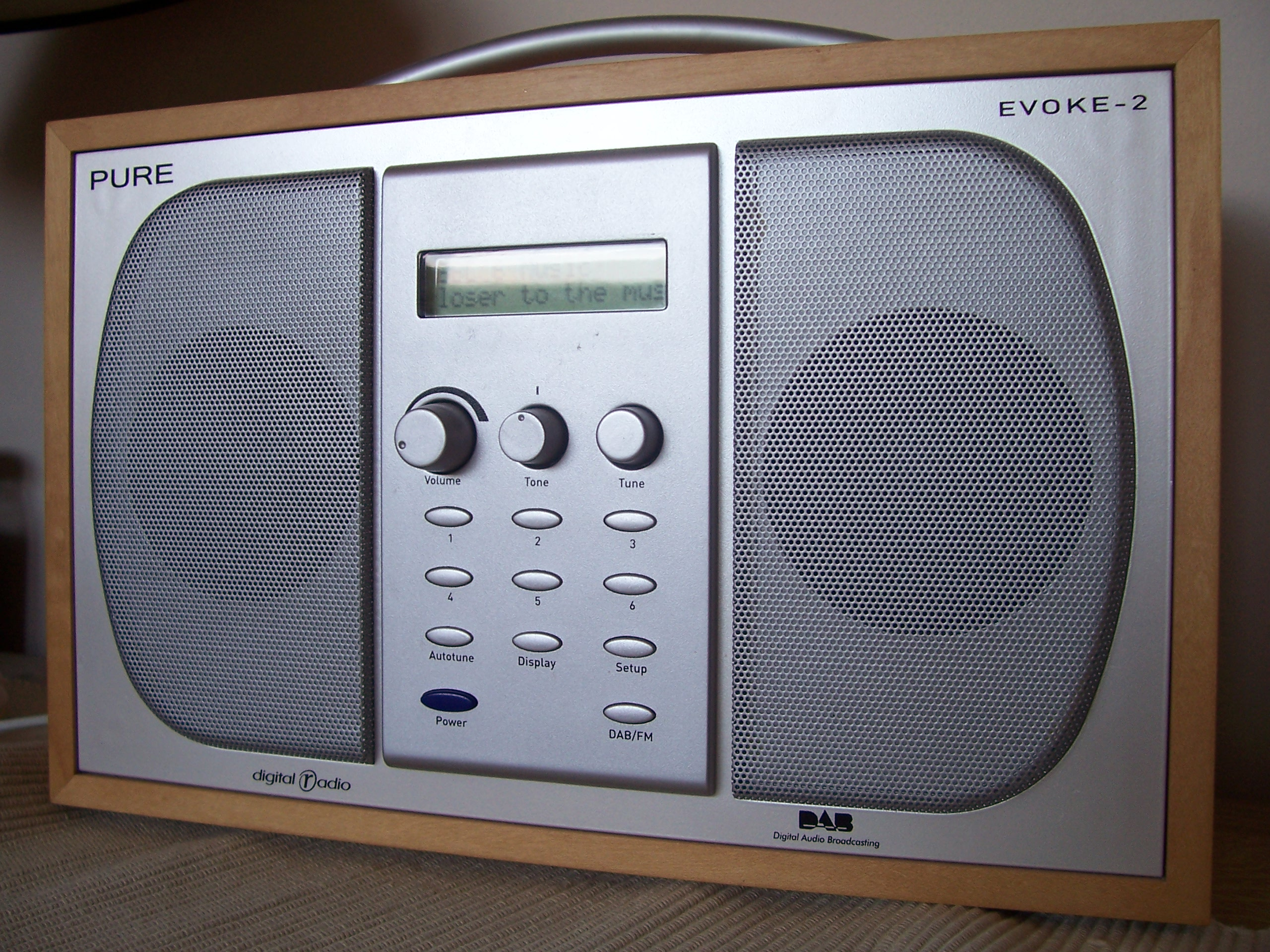
Pure Evoke-2

The original Pure Evoke-1 featured a 3-inch single loudspeaker, a small display and six preset buttons for storing favourite stations. An optional second speaker add-on unit could be added to output stereo. Following its success, in September 2003, Pure released the next generation Evoke-2, which added an extra stereo speaker built-in (therefore increasing the unit size), as well as analogue FM radio capability and the ability to power it through batteries in addition to mains. In 2004, Pure released the Evoke-1XT, an update of the Evoke-1. It has a white-on-blue coloured display now instead of black-on-green, adds a kitchen timer and countdown features, and has a USB port for firmware updates. A special version of the Evoke-1XT called Marshall Edition was announced in November 2006, designed to look like a Marshall amplifier. It has a volume knob that, unusually, goes up to 11 rather than 10. This receiver was made in collaboration between Pure, Marshall and Planet Rock.

In September 2005, Pure announced the Evoke-3, featuring pause and rewind as well as the ability to play digital files from an SD card. The website Trusted Reviews rated it 10 out of 10 in a review. The Pure Evoke-1S, an upgrade of the Evoke-1XT with an improved OLED display, improved sound and more presets, was introduced in July 2007. It is part of Pure's EcoPlus range of green products.

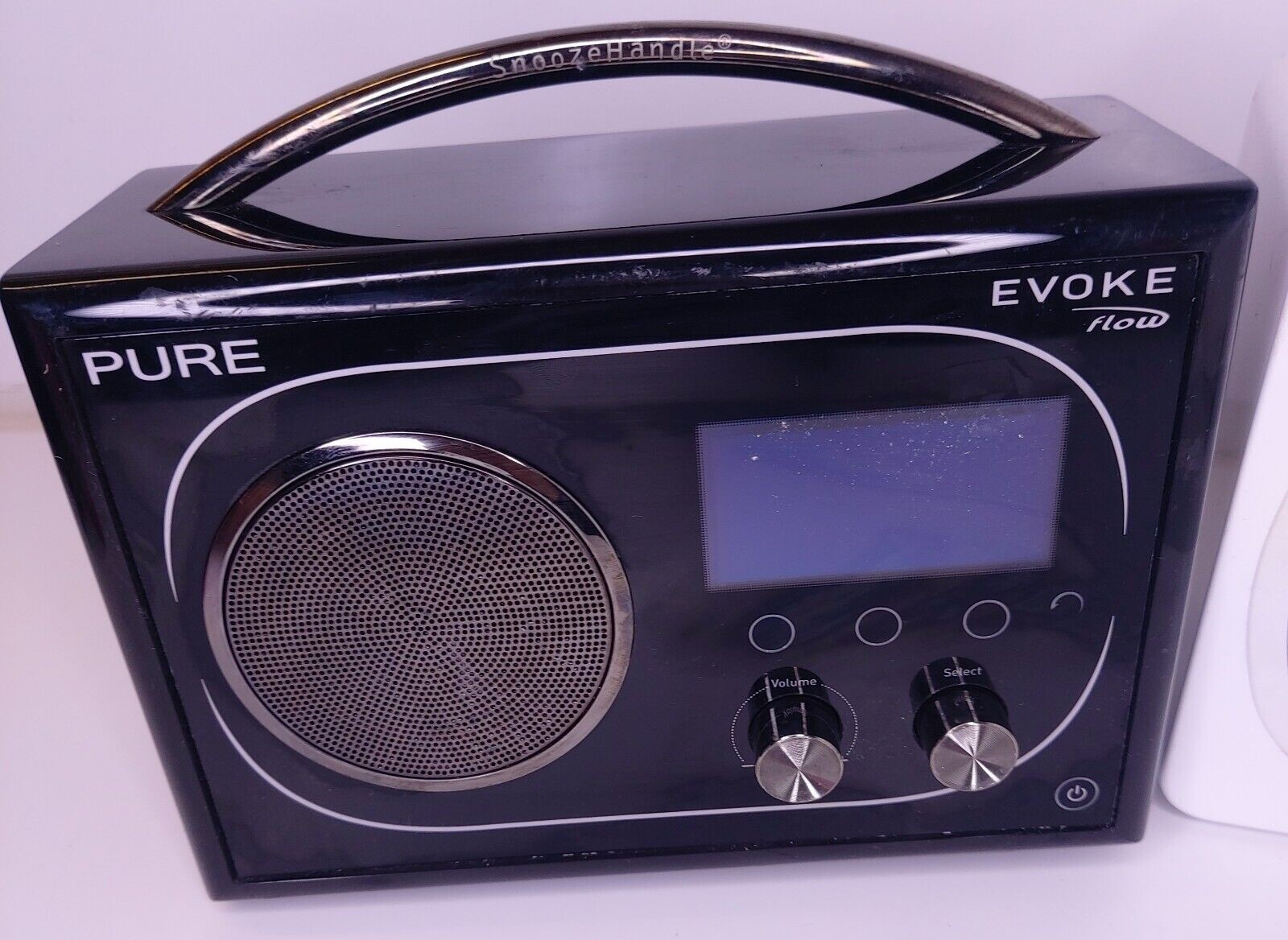
First generation Pure Evoke Flow

The company's first Internet radio, the Pure Evoke Flow, was released in September 2008. It had been in development for two years. They also launched a new flagship radio, Evoke-2S, as well as an updated version of the Evoke-1S called Evoke Mio, coming in six distinct colours and described as "luxurious" by Pure. In October 2010, Pure collaborated with designer Orla Kiely to create a specially printed Evoke Mio using her design.

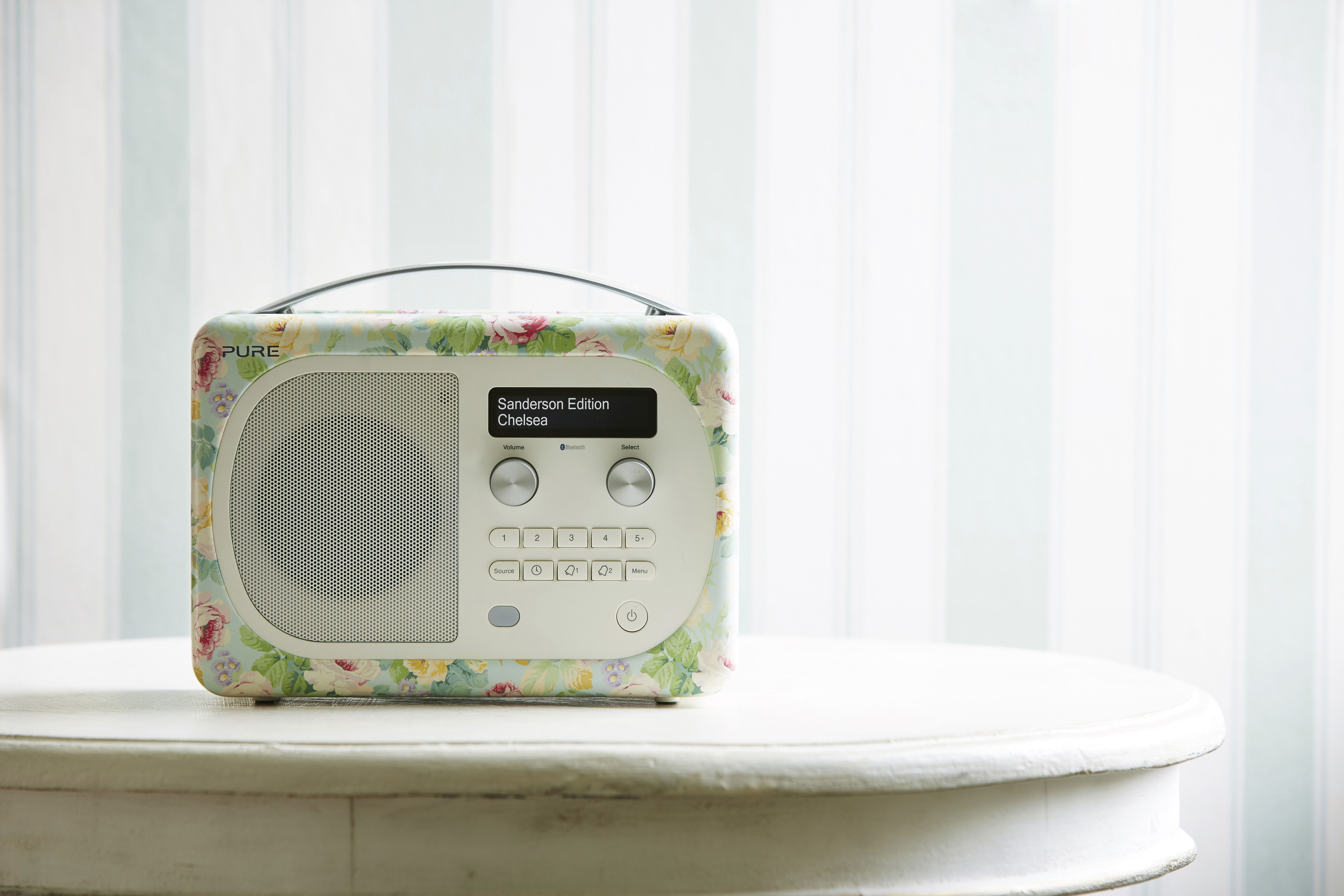
Evoke Mio D4 (Sanderson edition)

Pure commemorated their 10th anniversary landmark with the launch of the Evoke Mio Union Jack Edition. In August 2015, Pure collaborated with wallpaper maker Sanderson to create a number of Evoke Mio radios with floral prints.

In May 2013, Pure announced the high-end Evoke F4 DAB+ and Internet radio. Shortly afterwards they introduced Evoke D2, a compact sized radio. In November 2013, an upgraded version of the D2 was launched that included Bluetooth functionality. At the same time, they also introduced the Evoke D4.

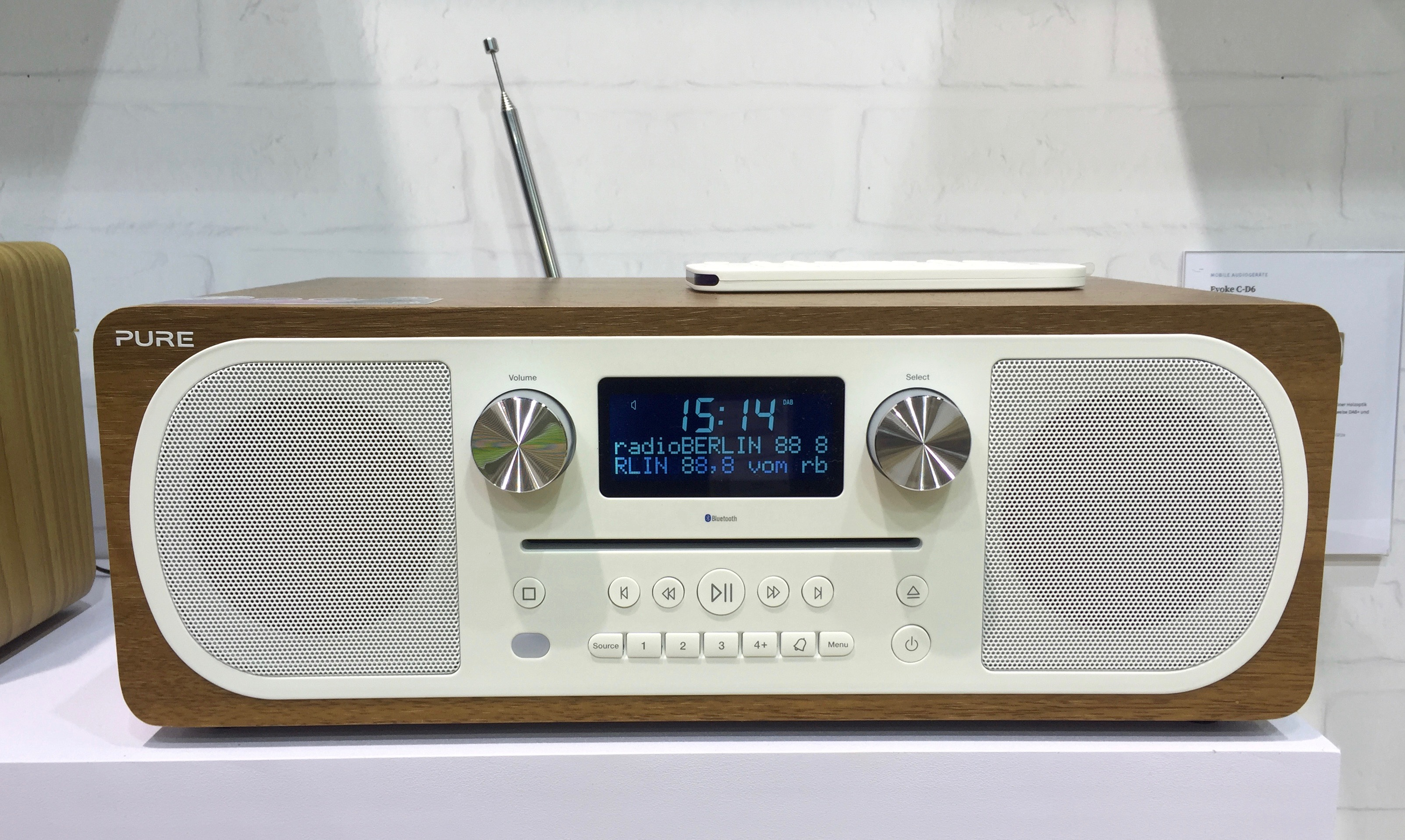
Evoke C-DC6 stereo system

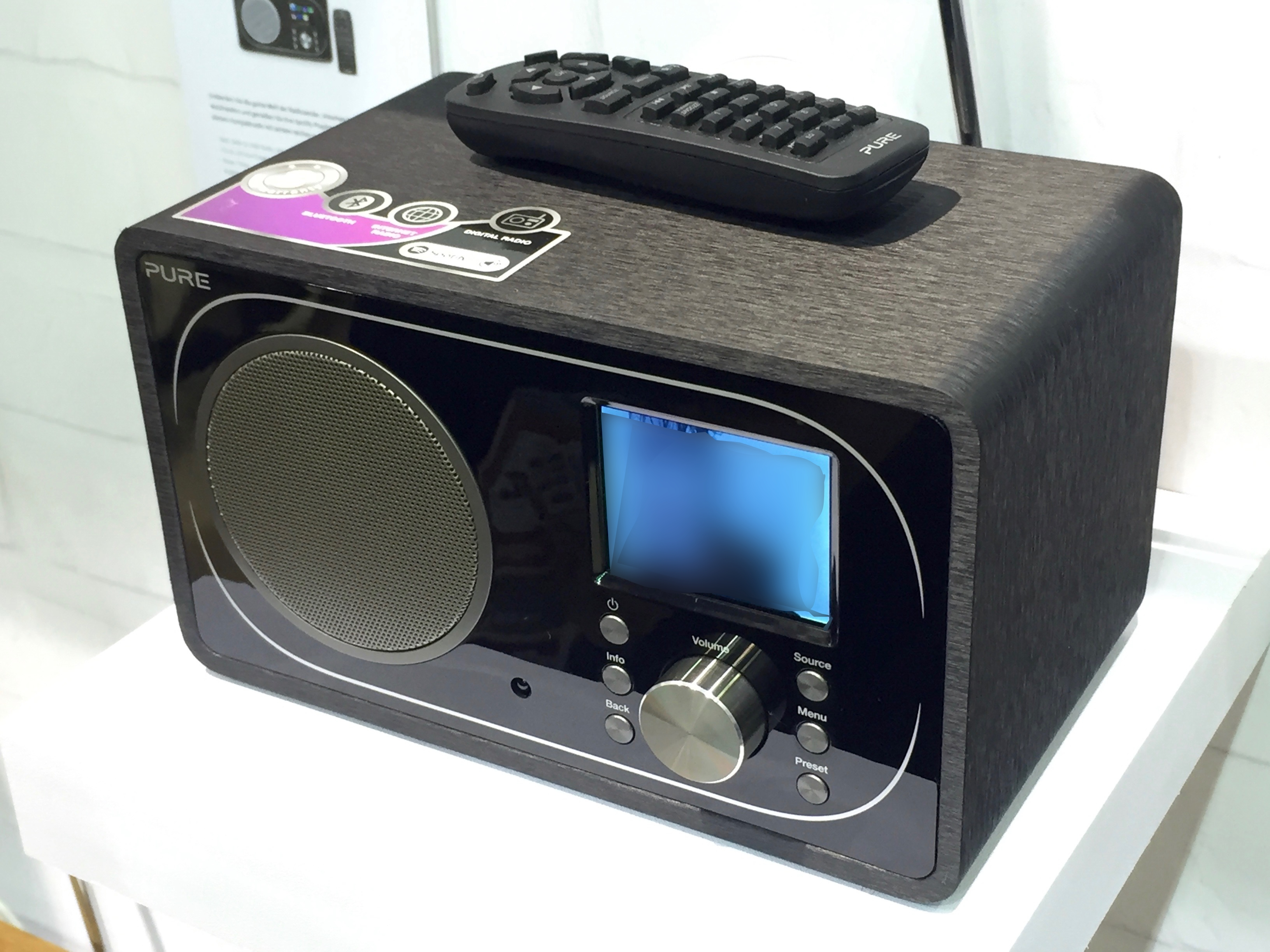
Pure Evoke F3

Pure also launched a subrange called Evoke C which are all-in-one tabletop systems. These consisted of the Evoke C-D4, C-D6 and C-F6 announced in September 2015. The company also released the Evoke F3. The Evoke H subrange of compact radios was released in 2016 consisting of the Evoke H3 and H2.

To commemorate Pure's 20th anniversary, the company launched the Evoke Home, Evoke Play and Evoke Spot in 2022. These three radios were designed in collaboration with London design studio Industrial Facility and each features a flip-up colour display. The Pure Evoke Home is designed to be a tabletop system with large grille. It includes a DAB+ tuner, Internet radio including services like Spotify, AUX input and a CD player. It is also the only of the trio to come with a remote control. The Evoke Play is a similar system that is slightly more compact and lacks a CD player. On the other hand, the Evoke Spot is a compact sized design. A version of the Evoke Play with a wooden front grille was later also released.

=== Elan ===
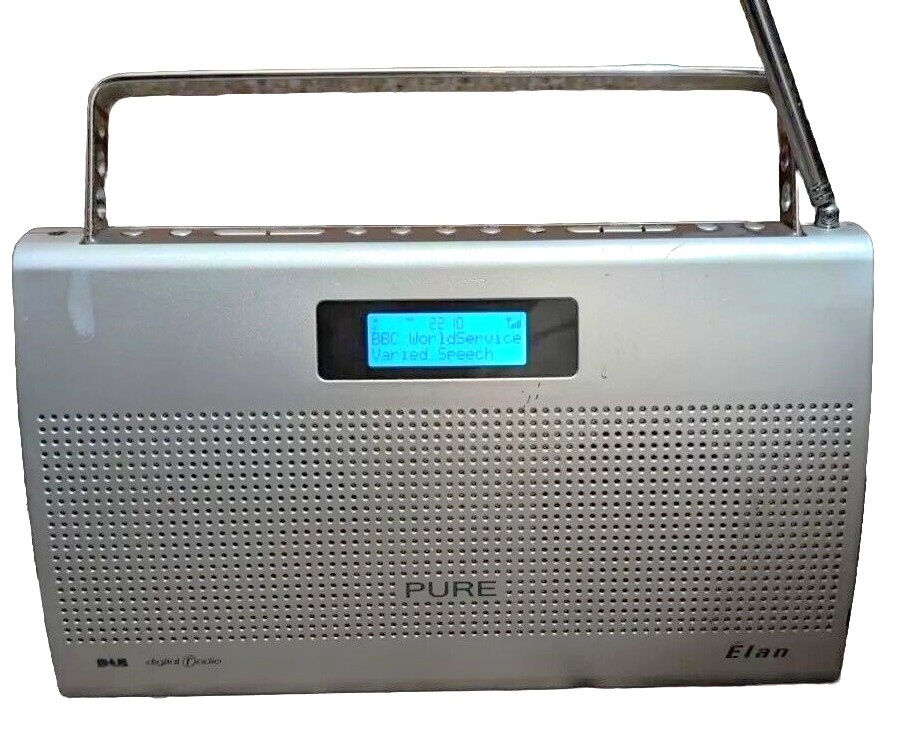
The original Pure Élan

The Élan range was originally created to be a more affordable alternative to the flagship Evoke range. The first Pure Élan DAB radio was launched in 2004. The Élan RV40 was announced in August 2006 and the DX40 in November 2006, the latter of which lacks the ReVu (pause and rewind) feature. The RV40 received three stars out of five by The Times. The Élan II was released in 2009.

In July 2016, the Pure Elan E3 was introduced and became the first sub-£50 DAB+ radio with a colour screen. In 2018, the Elan IR5 and IR3 were launched which are Internet connected, include Spotify Connect, and Bluetooth on the IR5.

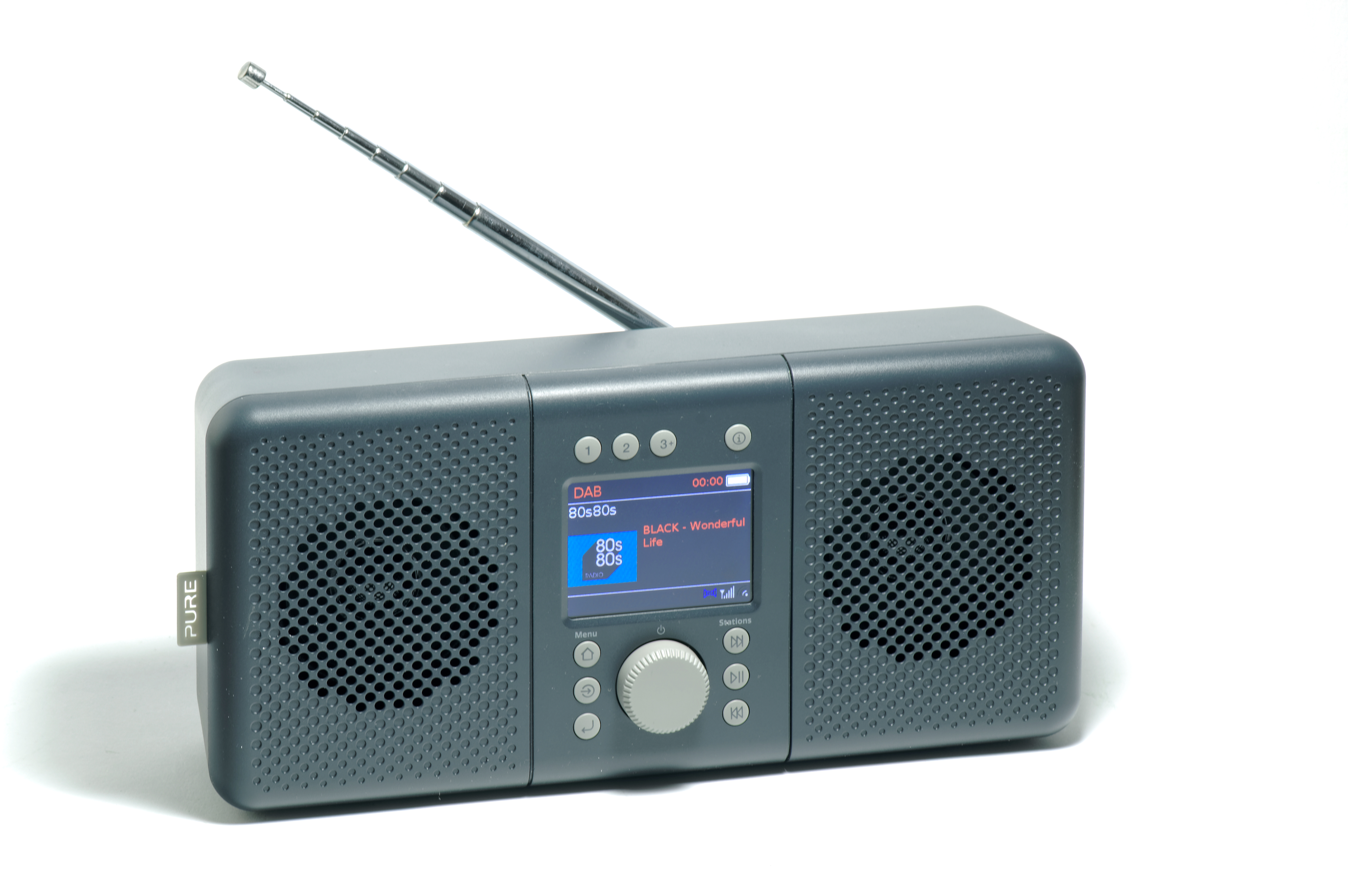
Pure Elan Connect+ DAB and Internet radio

The Pure Elan One was introduced in 2020. It was followed by a second generation model, Elan One2 (stylised Elan ONE²). The Pure Elan DAB+, Elan Connect and Elan Connect+ were launched in October 2020. The latter two include Internet radio functionality.

=== One ===
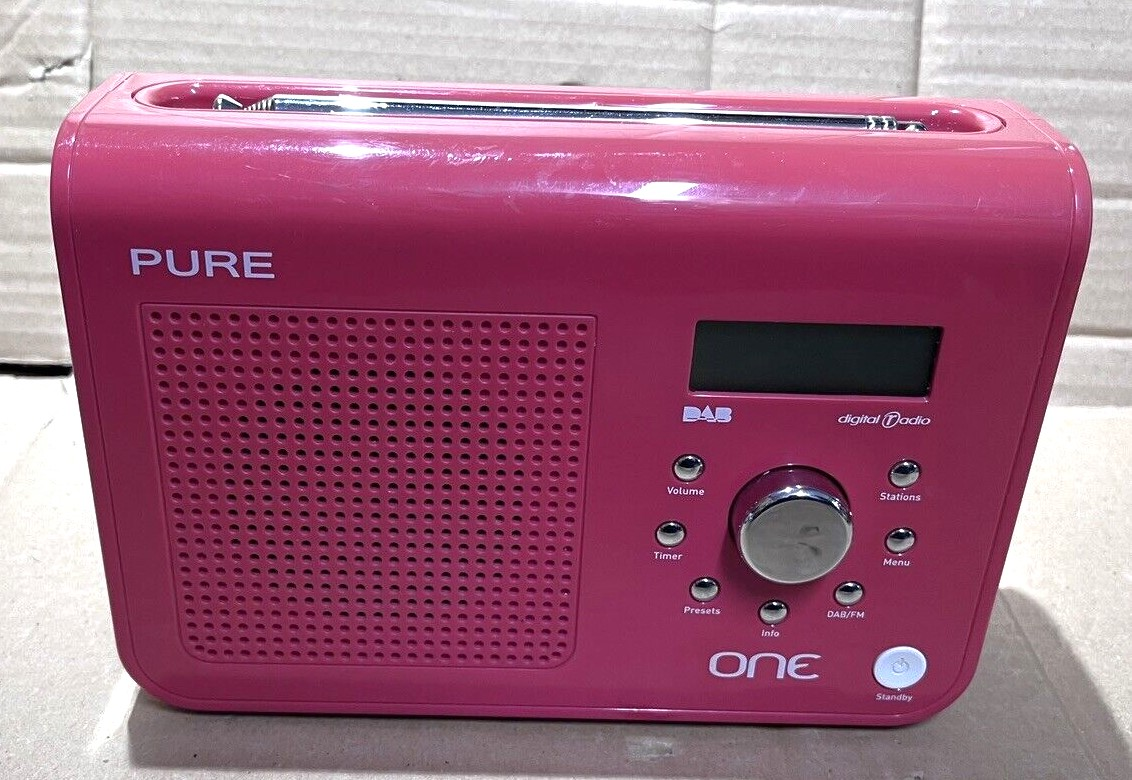
A pink Pure One

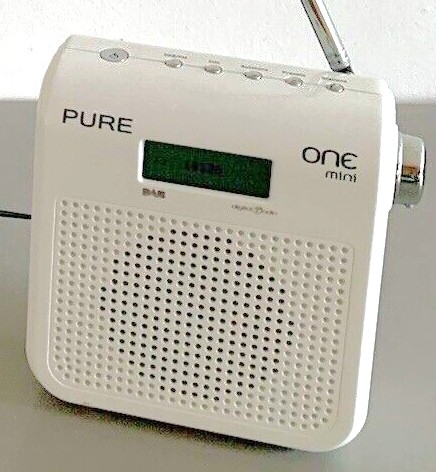
Pure One Mini

The Pure One (stylised PURE ONE) line were marketed as being more compact and affordable compared to the Evoke range. The original Pure One, a DAB and FM radio for sub-£50, was introduced in April 2006. It changed the wooden design from the Evoke into a more mainstream style. The One managed to sell over 250,000 units in under 18 months and had a broader appeal to include women and younger people. It was the best-selling radio in the UK from May 2006 to June 2007, according to research.

An upgraded version, Pure One Classic, was introduced in September 2008 which added pause and rewind capability as well as a DAB+ compatible chip. The Classic Series II was launched in 2011 with minor design changes and replaces ReVu with the Listen Later feature.

The company also released a smaller receiver, Pure One Mini, in June 2008, as well as the slightly larger Pure One Elite with stereo speakers. The "palm-sized" Pure One Mi, retailing for a low price of £35, was introduced in June 2010. In November 2010, the Pure One Flow was launched which adds Internet radio streaming capability on top of existing DAB+/DAB/FM, using Wi-Fi.

=== Bug ===
In 2004, the company introduced the Bug, the first-ever digital radio with EPG, pause, rewind and record. Pure marketed this pause and rewind feature as ReVu, a trademark, and it later appeared on other Pure radios as well. The Bug has a distinctive design, designed by Wayne Hemingway. In July 2006, Pure released the second generation, the Bug Too, in a titanium silver colour.

=== Highway ===
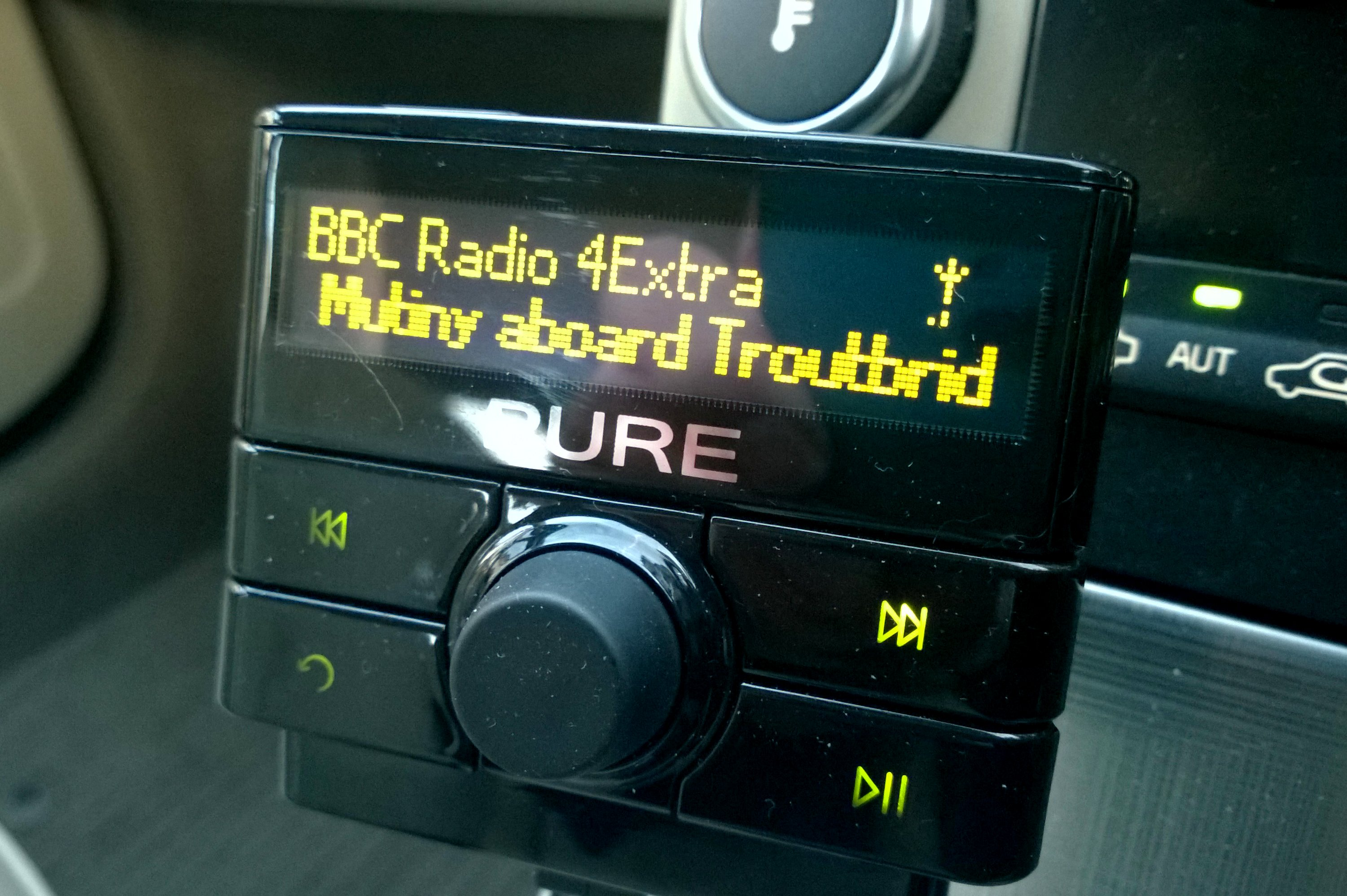
Pure Highway 300Di

In 2007, Pure released the Highway, claimed as the world's first in-car digital radio adapter. It was the second-best selling car audio product in the UK during 2008. In November 2011, the second generation, Pure Highway 300Di, was launched. This one features an external aerial in place of the wire aerial used on the original Highway, and made to be professionally installed.

Along with adapters, Pure also produced fitted car stereos, launching the Highway H260DBi and H240DB in 2013. In 2016, the Highway 600 and 400 adapters were released.

=== Classic ===
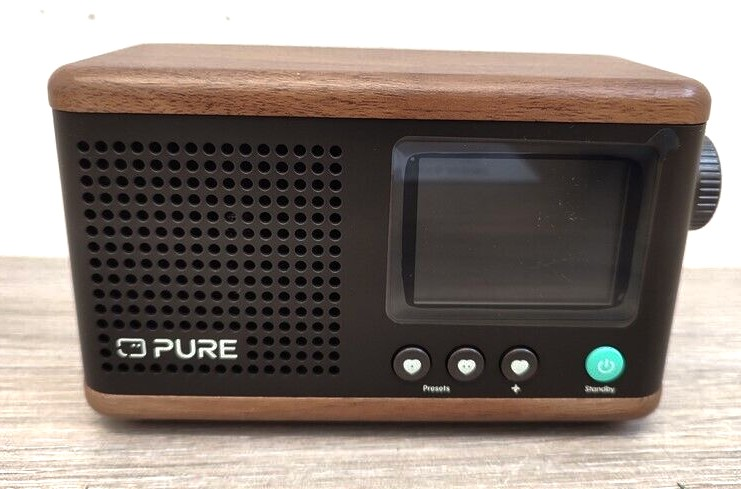
Black coloured Pure Classic Mini DAB+/FM radio and Bluetooth speaker

Pure launched the Classic series of affordable radios in February 2024. The Pure Classic H4 is a kitchen style DAB+ and FM radio as well as Bluetooth similar to the Evoke H4. The Pure Classic C-D6 is a larger system with stereo speakers, and includes a CD player, whereas the Classic Stereo is the high-end micro system model. Later that year the company introduced its fourth member, the portable Pure Classic Mini.

=== Bedside clock radios ===
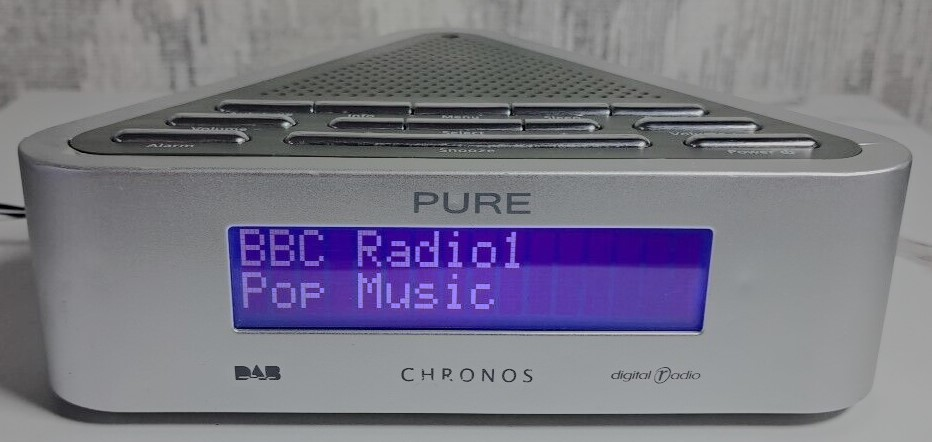
First generation Pure Chronos

In January 2004, Pure launched Tempus-1, similar in design to the Evoke series butmeant to be on the bedside. It is able to snooze from alarms using one touch on the radio's handle. The second generation is Tempus-1XT. In August 2007, the third generation, Tempus-1S, was announced. It added "Natural Sounds" to aid in sleeping, and it is also the first Tempus to be part of the EcoPlus range.

For the Christmas 2005 period, the company launched Pure Chronos, a DAB bedside alarm clock. A larger variant, including with a CD player, was launched in 2006. The Chronos iDock, launched in August 2007, adds iPod docking functionality. Also in late 2007, the Pure Chronos II was launched which adds FM on top of DAB capability and EcoPlus tagged.

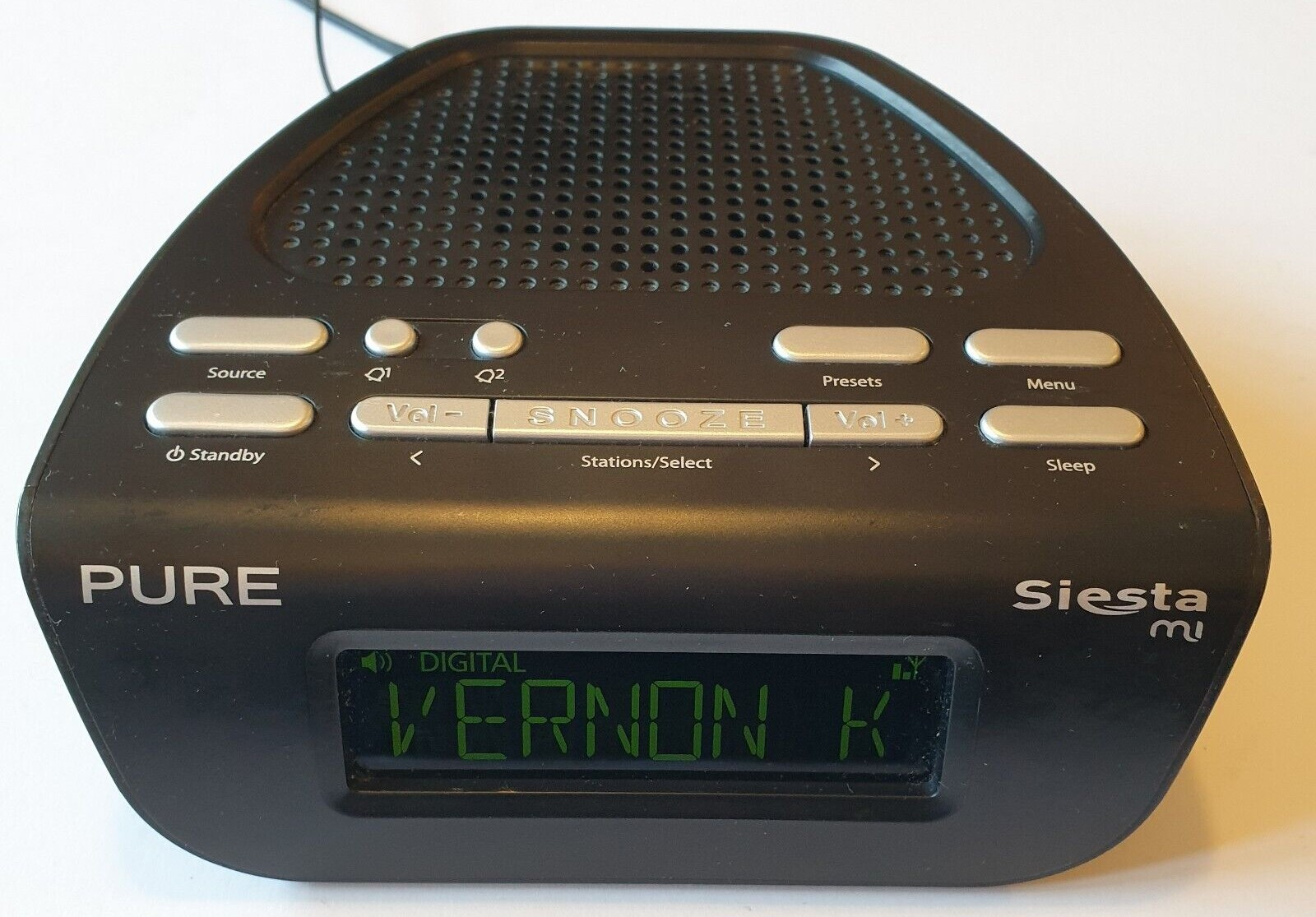
Pure Siesta Mi

The Pure Siesta, a DAB/FM clock radio, was launched in July 2007. It was the first Pure product of their Energy Saving Trust approved radio range named EcoPlus. These products had reduced power consumption, packaging materials from recycled and sustainable sources and components selected to minimise their environmental impact. The Internet-connected Pure Siesta Flow was launched in October 2009. The Pure Siesta Mi was launched in 2010 and this was followed by the Siesta Mi Series II in 2012. In September 2015, it launched the Pure Siesta Rise, followed by the Siesta S6 in 2017.

In 2010, Pure also launched the Twilight, a DAB/FM radio with dawn simulator lighting.

The Pure Moment, introduced in 2024, has DAB+, FM and acts as a Bluetooth speaker. It includes a nightlight and a sunrise alarm clock. The company have specifically marketed it as being "ASMR" and it contains a number of natural sounds.

=== Portable radios ===
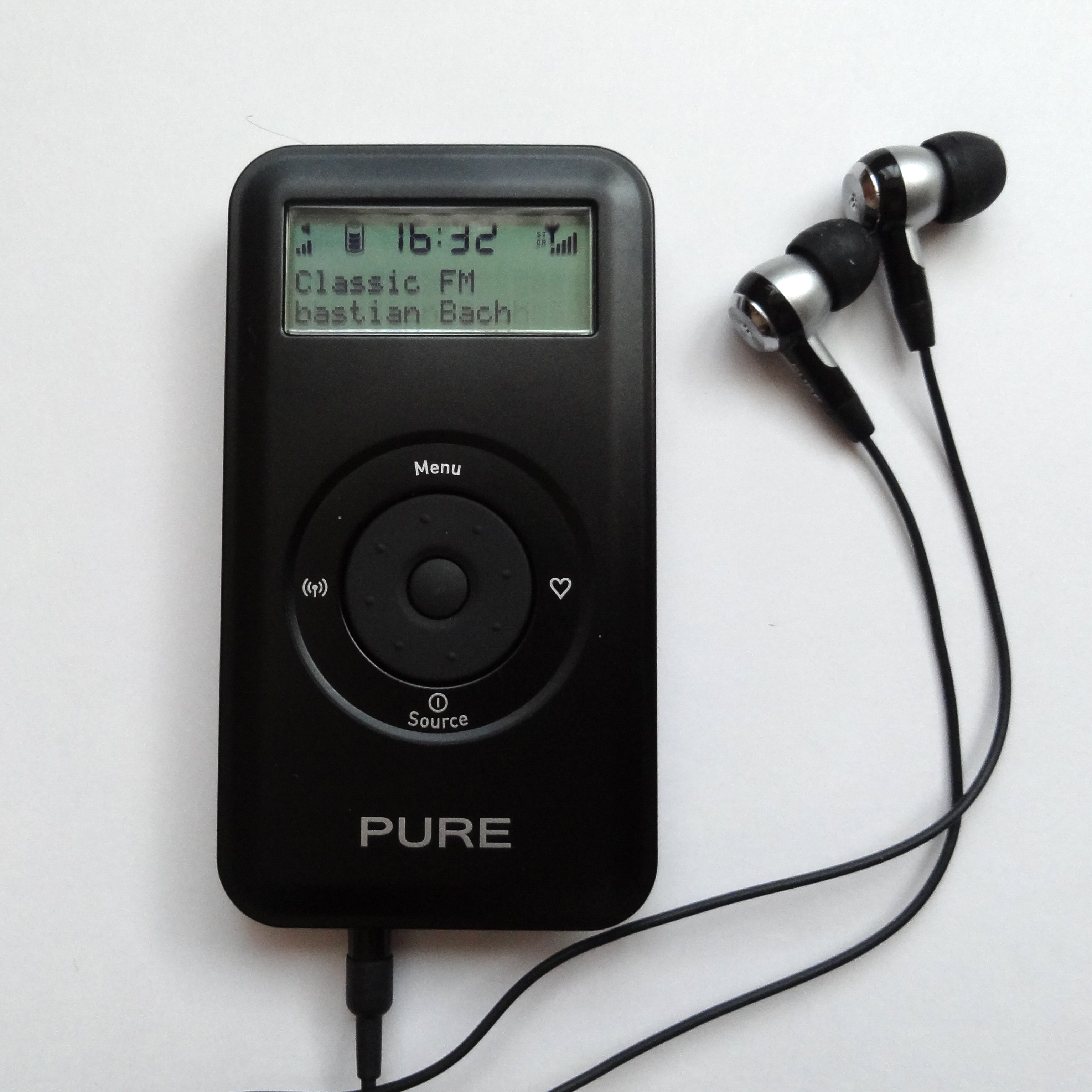
Move 2500 personal digital radio

Pure launched the PocketDAB 1000, which was the world's first pocket digital radio, in May 2003. The second generation, PocketDAB 1500, was introduced in June 2006. It adds FM with RDS, textSCAN, ChargePAK rechargeable battery pack.

In January 2007, the Pure Move was launched which is a palm-sized DAB radio designed for listening on the go. The Move 2500 was launched in August 2011. In 2012, the Pure Move 400D was introduced which is rugged and designed to be a travel companion. In February 2018, the company launched the pocket sized Move T4 radio and the smaller Move R3.

=== Micro systems ===
Pure also launched the Legato, a DAB/FM/CD micro system in 2004. A second generation Legato was launched in 2007. Pure produced numerous other micro systems including "slimline" ones, such as DTM-300 and DMX-50. In December 2008, the company announced the Avanti Flow, a single tabletop music hub featuring DAB and Internet radio, an iPod dock, and a DLNA streamer.

=== Other radio and audio products ===
The Sonus-1XT was launched in 2005 which they claimed was the world's first digital radio for the blind and visually impaired. In September 2005, the company released Pure Oasis, an IP65-certified weatherproof DAB radio. It was followed by the Internet-enabled receiver Pure Oasis Flow, announced in July 2010.

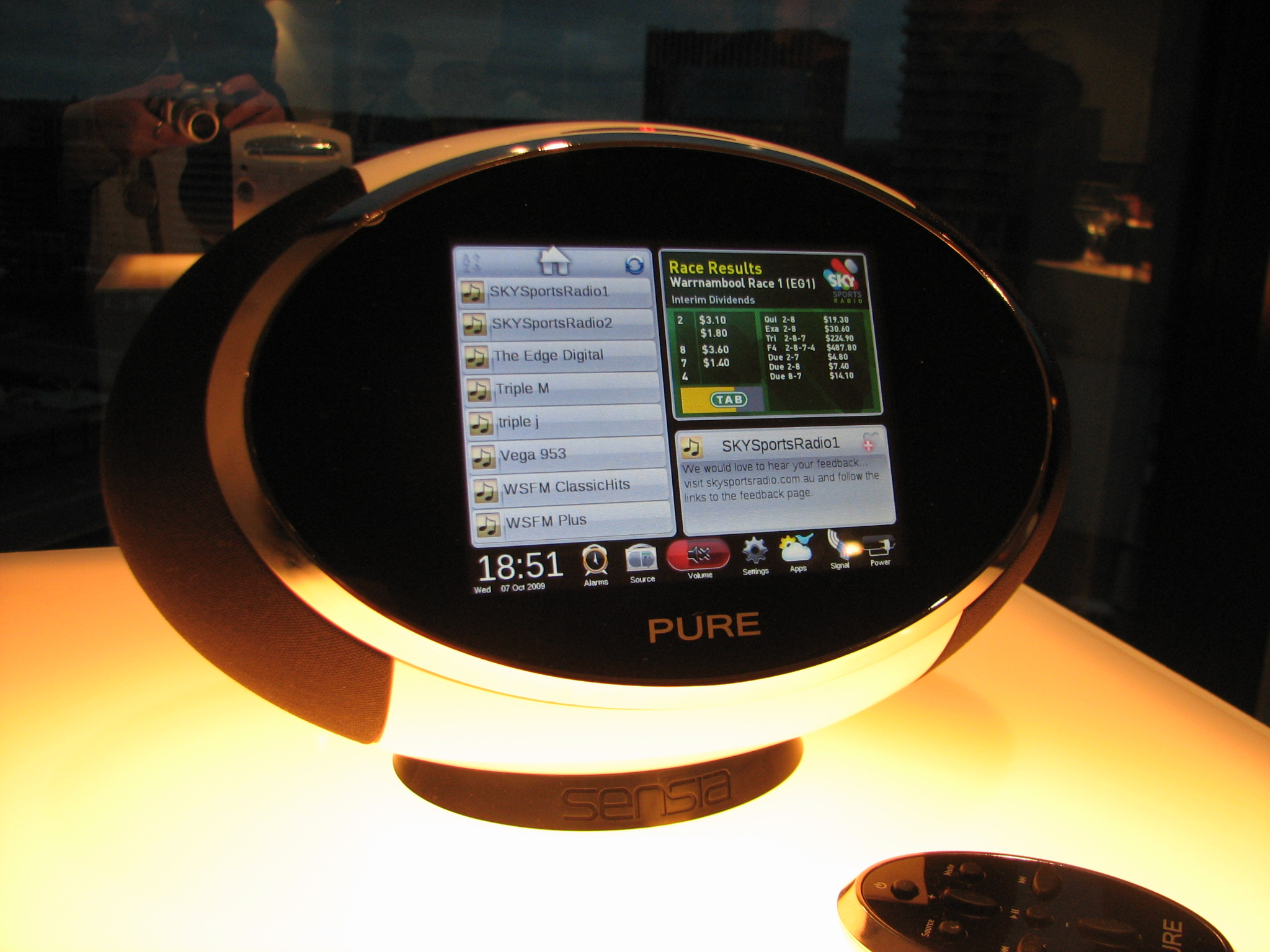
First generation Pure Sensia

The world's first high-resolution touchscreen digital radio, Sensia, was launched by Pure in September 2009. It has a 5.7-inch display, Internet radio, web widgets, and DAB and FM tuners (or HD Radio for the American market model). A second generation model, Sensia 200D, was launched in July 2012. It has updated software and interface, improved sound and new controls.

In 2011, the Pure Contour was released which is a high-end, curved DAB and Internet radio unit along with an iPod dock. In 2012, the Pure Contour 200Di Air was launched, which also features AirPlay, followed by the more budget friendly Contour 100Di that lacks AirPlay. The Contour i1 Air launched in 2013, based on the 100Di design but including AirPlay and also compatible with the Lightning connector.

In 2012 the Pure Jongo range was launched designed for multiroom audio use. The range consists of several different wireless speakers.

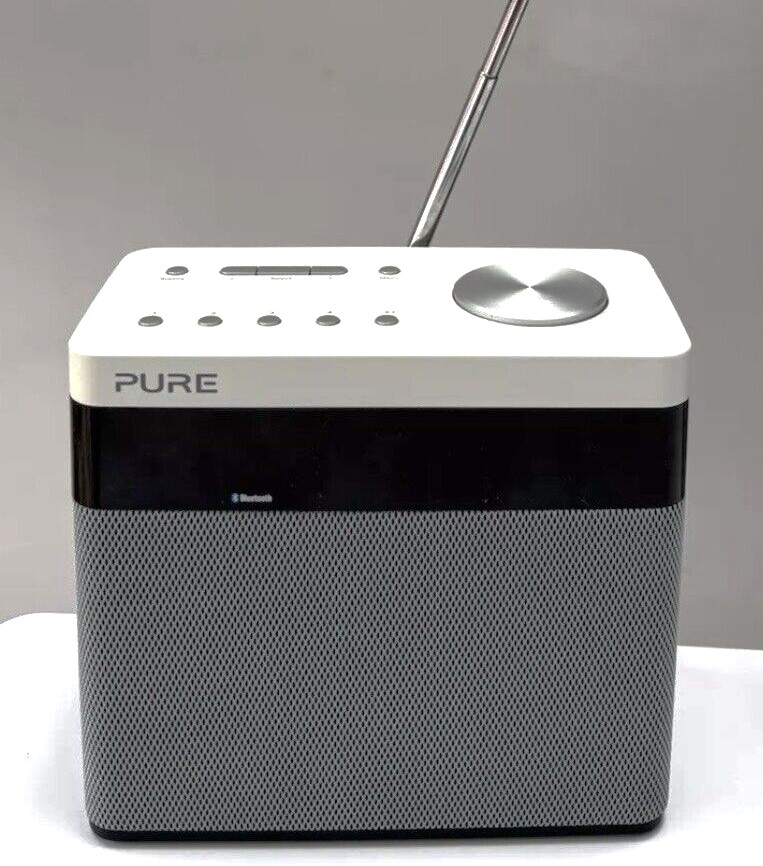
Pure Pop Maxi

In 2014, Pure launched the Pop series. They are made up of the Pop Mini, Pop Midi, and Pop Maxi, the latter of which is the largest in size. The distinguishable feature of this range has been the large power button which doubles as the volume knob and 'pops' up when pressed.

In May 2019, the Pure StreamR was launched with a speaker featuring Bluetooth, DAB+ and Amazon Alexa. It was followed by a smaller waterproof sibling in 2020, the StreamR Splash. Pure DiscovR was also launched as a higher end model.

== DAB+ upgrading ==
Pure has offered the ability of upgrading certain radio receivers with standard DAB to be able to receive DAB+ broadcasts. However not all models are supported due to differing chipsets.

== Music subscription service ==
In 2010, Pure Digital launched a subscription music service in the UK initially called FlowSongs and later branded Pure Music. The cost of subscription was offered for £4.99 monthly. This service closed down in October 2015.

== Sales and share ==
Pure sold its 500,000th radio receiver on 17 March 2005. As of end 2005, Pure Digital held a 30% market share by value in the UK, keeping it firmly the leader in the digital radio market. In December 2006, the company sold its one millionth radio receiver, and reached the two million landmark in July 2008.

Pure shipped in excess of five million digital radios worldwide as of 2015, positioning itself as the best-selling digital radio manufacturer.
