= Pekka Lundmark =

Finnish business executive

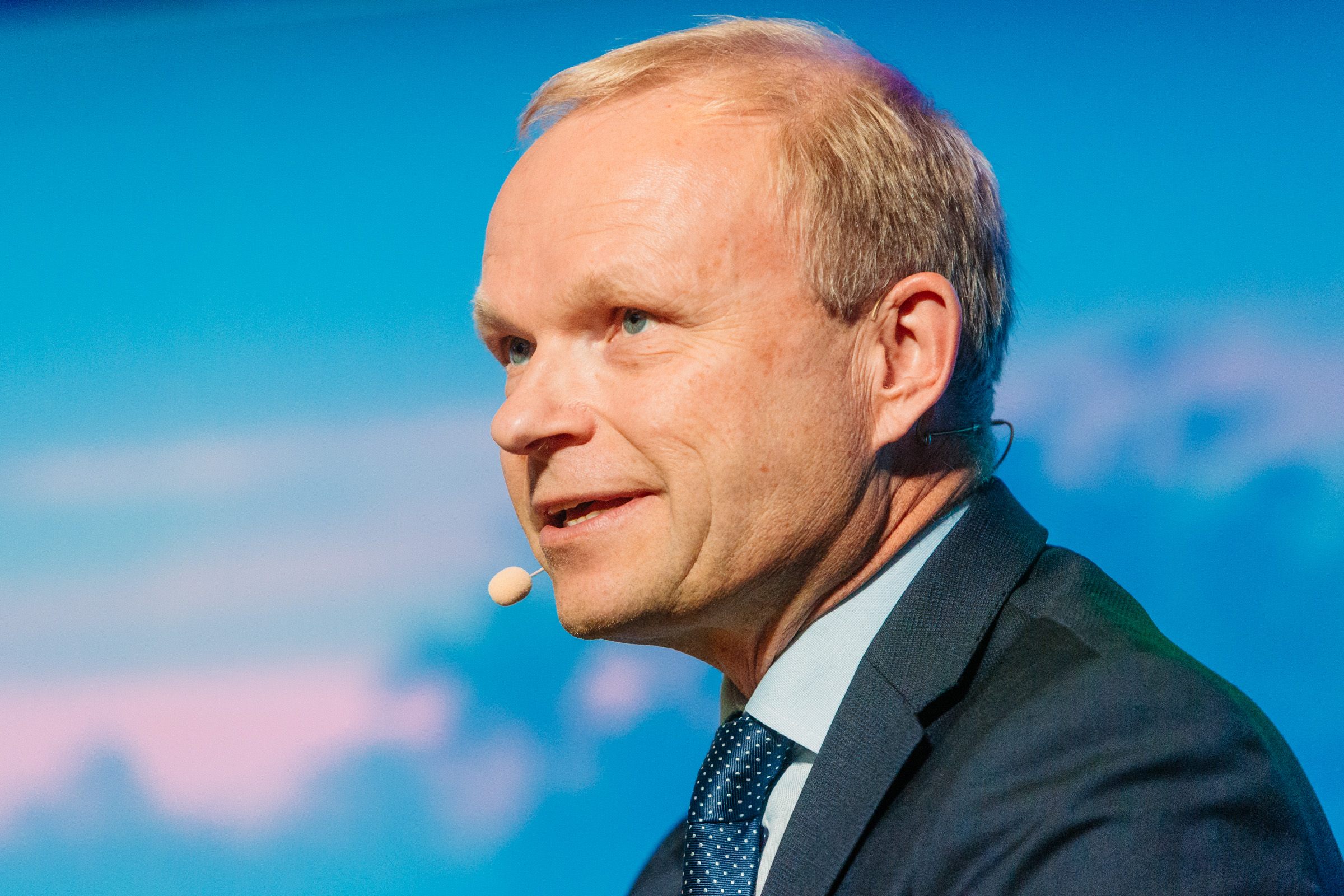
- Lundmark in 2017
- Born: 9 December 1963 (age 61); Espoo, Uusimaa, Finland
- Education: Helsinki University of Technology (MSc)
- Occupation: Business executive
- Employer(s): Nokia (1990–2000, 2020–2025); Fortum (2015–2020); Konecranes (2004–2015); Hackman (2002–2004); Startupfactory (2000–2002)
- Title: former CEO of Nokia Corporation

Pekka Lundmark (born 9 December 1963) is a Finnish business executive, and former president and CEO of Nokia, from 2020 to March 2025. Previously, he was CEO of Fortum, a Finnish state-owned energy company, from 2015 to July 2020.

== Early life and education ==
Lundmark was born on 9 December 1963 in Espoo, Finland. He graduated from the Helsinki University of Technology with a master's degree in applied physics in 1988.

== Career ==
Lundmark began his career with Nokia in 1990, where he held various executive positions. He left Nokia in 2000, and joined Startupfactory Oy as a managing partner from 2000 to 2002, followed by a stint as president and CEO of Hackman, a Finnish cutlery and cookware company, from 2002 to 2004. Lundmark then joined Konecranes, a Finnish company specialising in lifting equipment, as the group executive vice president in 2004, and became the president and CEO of the company in 2005, serving until 2015, when he joined Fortum as the president and CEO.

On 2 March 2020, Nokia’s board of directors announced that Lundmark would be the new president and chief executive officer of Nokia. Lundmark was expected to leave Fortum on 31 August 2020, and join Nokia on 1 September 2020. He succeeded Rajeev Suri, who had served as president and CEO of Nokia since 2014. Suri will remain as an adviser on the board for the first year after stepping down. Nokia praised Lundmark's record at Fortum, saying that he had "consistently delivered robust total shareholder returns, successfully renewed the company's strategy, and positioned it to be a strong player in the transforming global energy sector."

In June, it was announced that Lundmark would join Nokia on 1 August 2020, one month earlier than planned. The announcement came after Fortum said its chief financial officer, Markus Rauramo, would be taking over as Fortum’s CEO from 1 July.

Lundmark has served on the boards of various industry organizations in Finland, including as chairman of the board of Finland’s Technology Industry Association (Finnish: Teknologiateollisuus) in 2011. Most recently, he served as the 2019 and 2020 chairman of the board of the Confederation of Finnish Industries (EK; Finnish: Elinkeinoelämän Keskusliitto; Swedish: Finlands Näringsliv), the largest employers' organization in Finland. During his tenure at EK, he prioritized partnering with the EU to find solutions to curb climate change and increasing the employment rate.

On 10 February 2025, Nokia announced that Lundmark would step down as president and CEO on 31 March and be succeeded by Justin Hotard.

== Other activities ==
- European Round Table of Industrialists (ERT), Member

== Personal life ==
Lundmark is married, and has three children.

Business positions
Preceded by Rajeev Suri	CEO of Nokia Corporation; 2020–2025	Succeeded by Justin Hotard
Preceded by Timo Karttinen as interim CEO	CEO of Fortum; 2015–2020	Succeeded by Markus Rauramo
