= Konecranes =

Finnish crane and lifting equipment manufacturer

Konecranes Oyj
- Type: Julkinen osakeyhtiö
- Traded as: Nasdaq Helsinki: KCR.HE
- ISIN: FI0009005870
- Industry: Engineering and service
- Predecessor: Crane division of Kone
- Founded: April 15, 1994; 32 years ago
- Headquarters: Hyvinkää, Finland
- Key people: Pasi Laine (chairman); Marko Tulokas (president and CEO); Teo Ottola (CFO)
- Products: Heavy and standard lifting cranes and service
- Revenue: ▲€4.2 billion (2024)
- Operating income: ▲€511.4 million (2024)
- Net income: ▲€368.4 million (2024)
- Total assets: ▲€4.788 billion (2024)
- Total equity: ▲€1.858 billion (2024)
- Number of employees: ▲16,842 (2024)
- Divisions: Industrial Equipment; Service; Port Solutions
- Website: www.konecranes.com

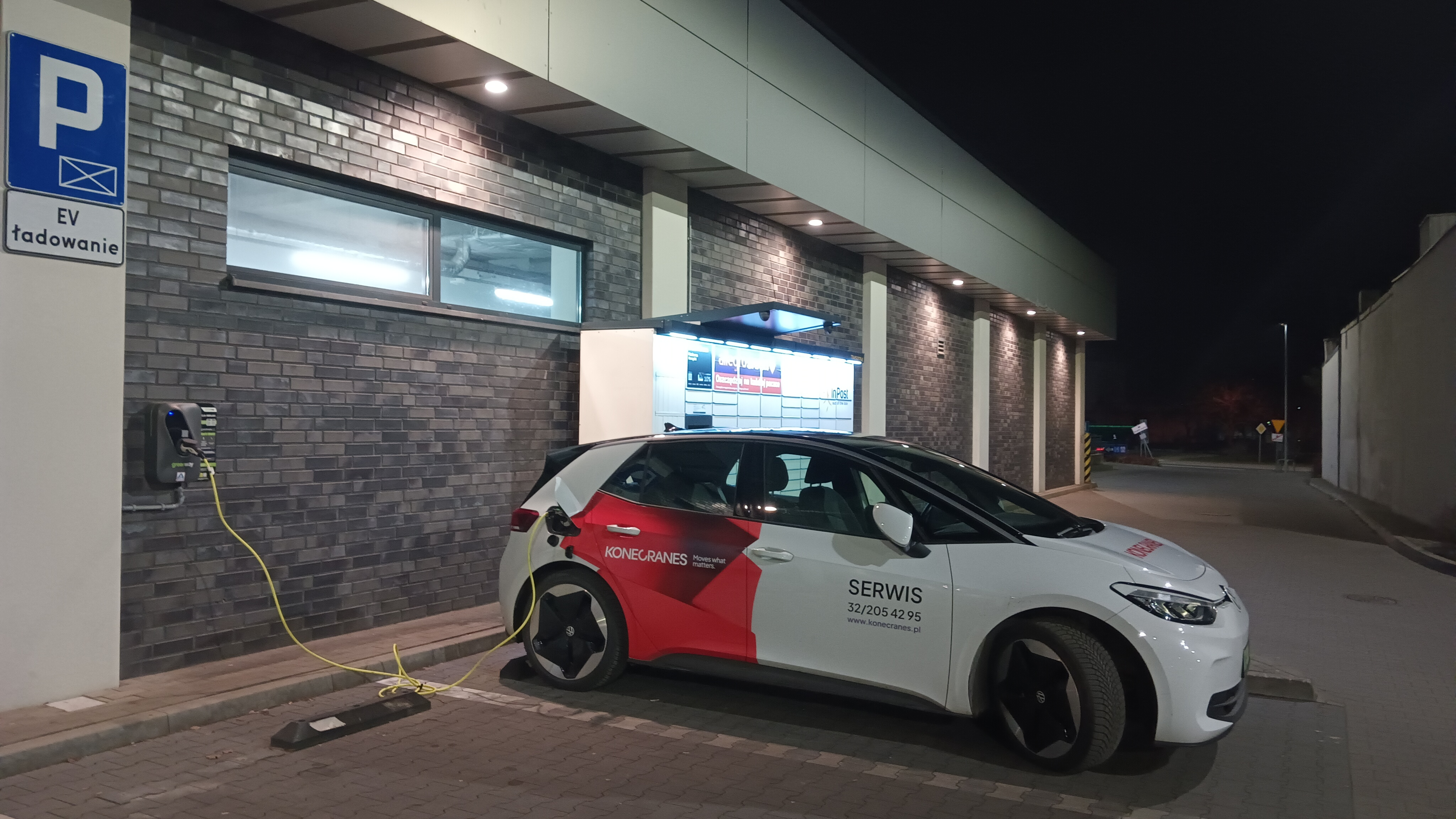
Konecranes salesman's electric car charging, Tomaszów Mazowiecki, Poland

Konecranes Oyj is a Finnish company, headquartered in Hyvinkää, which specializes in the manufacture and service of cranes and lifting equipment as well as the service of machine tools.

Konecranes is one of the largest crane manufacturers in the world and it produces about one in ten of the world's cranes, of which around 80% are for use in factories, the rest at ports. Konecranes operates in over 50 countries and has about 16,800 employees.

== Corporate history ==
=== As part of Kone (1933-1994) ===
Konecranes originated within the Finnish Kone Corporation. Its history traces back to 1933 when Kone embarked on the production of Electric Overhead Traveling Cranes. In 1988 the crane business was combined into the KONE Cranes Division.

KONE Cranes Division remained an integral component of Kone until the year 1994. In February of that year, Kone made a strategic decision to refocus its efforts on the elevator business, leading to the divestiture of the crane division into an independent entity. This newly established company was named KCI Konecranes, with ownership transferred to the equity company Industri Kapital. The first CEO was Dr. Stig Gustavson.

=== KCI Konecranes (1994-2005) ===
During Gustavson's time as CEO of KCI Konecranes, the company saw success with profitable operations and increased order backlog. The company was listed on the Helsinki Stock Exchange in 1996.

The Asian economic crisis in the late 1990s temporarily affected sales, but in the 2000s, KCI Konecranes continued to grow by establishing new factories and making acquisitions to expand into new markets, becoming one of Finland's most international companies.

In 1997, the company acquired German MAN SWF Krantechnik, and operations in China began in 2002 with a factory in Shanghai. The product range expanded in 2004 to include lift trucks and reach stackers with the acquisition of the Swedish SMV Liftrucks. Further acquisitions followed in 2005, including R.STAHL AG's material handling division and MMH Holdings, Inc.

A merger plan between Partek and KCI Konecranes was announced in 2002. However, the merger fell apart on the same day as Kone unexpectedly announced the purchase of the state's 30.2% ownership in Partek, effectively preventing the union. Gustavson acknowledged Partek's move to Kone and revealed the company's withdrawal from the merger plan.

In the summer of 2005 Gustavson retired as CEO but he remained as the chairman of the board. Pekka Lundmark, then the CEO of Hackman, succeeded Gustavson as CEO of KCI Konecranes.

=== Konecranes (2006-2015) ===
In 2006 KCI Konecranes released a new global brand strategy. In it they dropped the KCI from the company name and adopted the slogan "Lifting Businesses". Konecranes continued its focus on diversification, expanding its product portfolio to include a broader range of lifting equipment, material handling, and industrial services. This strategy allowed the company to tap into new markets and industries beyond its traditional stronghold in port and container handling equipment. By 2008, the acquisition of key competitors and strategic partnerships enabled the company to establish a more robust presence in North America, Asia, and other emerging markets. This period saw Konecranes setting up new manufacturing facilities and service centers across various continents.

In the early 2010s, Konecranes invested heavily in research and development to introduce technologies such as automation, remote monitoring, and predictive maintenance, into its product offerings. In 2015 Pekka Lundmark announced his resignation as the CEO. He was succeeded by Panu Routila who came from Ahlström Capital.

=== Konecranes and Terex (2015-2020) ===
In the summer of 2015 Konecranes announced a merger plan with the US based Terex Corporation. The new Konecranes Terex plc would have been based in Finland and would have been the industry leader. The merger was estimated to be completed by the end of the first half of 2016. In May 2016 the merger was called off due to an competing offer to Terex by the China based Zoomlion. Instead of the merger Terex agreed to sell the Material Handling and Port Solutions division to Konecranes for 1.3 billion euros. In August of the same year the European Commission approved the sale but with the condition that Konecranes would have to divest their STAHL Cranesystems business. In December Konecranes announced that it had sold Stahl to US based Columbus McKinnon.

In January 2017 the acquisition of the Terex MHPS -division was completed. Also the MHPS got back its old name as the division was renamed to as Demag Cranes & Components.

In February 2020 Rob Smith was named as the new CEO. He joined Konecranes from AGCO.

=== Konecranes and Cargotec (2020-2022) ===
In October 2020 Konecranes announced a plan to merge with another Finnish company called Cargotec (also a former division of Kone). In August 2021 Rob Smith announce that he would leave Konecranes by the end of the year. Until the merger was completed, the interim CEO of Konecranes was the CFO, Mr. Teo Ottola. It was also announced that the CEO of Cargotec, Mika Vehviläinen, would be the CEO of the new company. Also in August 2021 the Chinese State Administration for Market Regulation approved the merger. In February 2022, the European Commission approved the merger. In 29 March 2022 the UK Competitions and Markets authority announced that they were blocking the merger. On the same day Konecranes and Cargotec announced that the merger had been cancelled.

=== Konecranes (2022- ) ===
In October 2022, Anders Svensson was appointed as the new CEO of Konecranes. He joined Konecranes from Sandvik. In April 2024, it was announced that Konecranes had acquired the German crane and service supplier, Kocks Kranbau for an undisclosed amount. In December 2024, Konecranes acquired the Dutch Peinemann Port Services BV and Peinemann Container Handling BV, based in Rotterdam.

On May 15, 2025, Marko Tulokas, then leading Konecranes' Industrial Equipment business area, was named as the new CEO of Konecranes. The company had announced in January 2025 that then-CEO Anders Svensson would leave the company. Svensson started as CEO at Sweden's Hexagon AB on July 21, 2025.

== Business operations ==
Konecranes operates in three business areas.

=== Industrial Equipment ===
The Industrial Equipment business area specializes in the design, production, and distribution of industrial cranes and material handling equipment. This includes overhead cranes, workstation lifting systems, hoists, and customized load handling attachments. It serves diverse sectors such as manufacturing, automotive, steel, and paper.

=== Service ===
The Service business area delivers maintenance, refurbishment, and repair services.

=== Port Services ===
The Port Services business area is dedicated to catering to the demands of port and terminal operations worldwide. Using advanced container handling technologies, this segment delivers container cranes, straddle carriers, and other specialized equipment for cargo movement and storage in ports.

== Subsidiaries ==
Some of the fully owned subsidiaries by Konecranes:

- Demag Cranes & Components
- Donati Sollevamenti
- Eurofactory
- MHE-Demag
- Morris Material Handling
- Port Equipment Southern Africa
- R&M Materials Handling
- Saudi Cranes & Steel Works Factory
- SWF Krantechnik
- Verlinde

== Shareholders ==
The top 10 major shareholders as of 30 June 2025:

1. Solidium Oy
2. Oras Invest Ltd.
3. Varma Mutual Pension Insurance Company
4. Ilmarinen Mutual Pension Insurance Company
5. Stig Gustavson and family
6. Elo Mutual Pension Insurance Company
7. The State Pension Fund
8. Nordea Funds
9. Samfundet folkhälsan i Svenska Finland rf
10. OP Investment Funds
