= Justin Hotard =

US business executive

- Education: University of Illinois Urbana-Champaign (BS); Massachusetts Institute of Technology (MBA)
- Occupation: Business executive
- Title: President and CEO, Nokia

Justin Hotard (born 1974) is an American business executive. He has been the president and CEO of Nokia since April 2025, replacing Pekka Lundmark.

Hotard earned a bachelor's degree in electrical engineering from the University of Illinois Urbana-Champaign and an MBA from the MIT Sloan School of Management.

Before joining Nokia, he led Intel's Data Center and AI Group from 2024 to 2025. He previously held leadership roles at Hewlett Packard Enterprise, NCR Corporation and Symbol Technologies, and began his career as a systems engineer at Motorola.

Hotard is a member of The Business Council.

Business positions
Preceded by Pekka Lundmark	CEO of Nokia; 2025–present	Succeeded by Incumbent
