= Hossein Yassaie =

Iranian-British businessman

Sir Hossein Yassaie FREng
- Born: M. Hossein Yassaie
- Education: University of Birmingham (BSc, PhD)
- Known for: CEO Imagination Technologies Pure Radio Graphics/Video technology enabling smart phones Digital TV, Digital Radio
- Awards: Knight Bachelor (2013); FREng (2016) FIET (2016) NED Award 2022
- Scientific career
- Workplaces: Imagination Technologies; STMicroelectronics; Inmos
- Thesis: Application of charge-coupled devices to within-pulse sector scanning sonars (1983)

Sir Hossein Yassaie is a British entrepreneur and investor in technology sector. Interests have included digital TV, smart phones, and countering the threat of internet mis/dis-information.

Previously Yassaie was the chief executive officer of Imagination Technologies where he worked from 1992 to 2016. Prior to Imagination he worked at Inmos and at STMicroelectronics. Yassaie chairs the not-for-profit industry and community association TechWorks. In addition to the technology companies, Yassaie has a fine-dining experiential restaurant group in his portfolio operating under Crockers Restaurants.

== Education and early life ==
Yassaie came to Britain in 1976 from Iran and became a United Kingdom national in 1984. He studied Electronics and Communications at the University of Birmingham gaining a first class honours Bachelor of Science degree in 1979. He stayed at Birmingham to complete a Doctor of Philosophy degree in signal processing on the application of Charge-coupled devices (CCDs) to Sonar.

== Career ==
Following his PhD, Hossein was a postdoctoral research fellow at the University of Birmingham for several years.

Yassaie spent eight years working at STMicroelectronics and Inmos. During this time he was involved in the development and marketing of microprocessors, signal and video processors including the first digital TV chip. A semiconductor business unit at STMicroelectronics resulted. He joined Imagination Technologies in 1992, becoming its CEO in June 1998, and created the brand Pure. Yassaie resigned his position as CEO of Imagination Technologies on 8 February 2016.

His interests include user interfaces, computing architectures, health and education systems, and countering the threat of internet mis/dis- information.

== Awards and honours ==
Yassaie received a knighthood in the 2013 New Year Honours in recognition of his services to technology and innovation. He was awarded the honorary degree of DUniv by the University of Birmingham in 2013. In September 2016 he was elected a Fellow of the Institution of Engineering and Technology, FIET, and of the Royal Academy of Engineering, FREng. In March 2022 he received the Sunday Time's NED of the Year Award for Private & Private Equity Category NED Award 2022
