= Simon Beresford-Wylie =

CEO of Nokia Siemens Networks (b. 1958)

- Born: 18 May 1958 (age 68); United Kingdom
- Education: Australian National University; Stanford University/National University of Singapore
- Title: CEO, Imagination Technologies
- Spouse: Margaret
- Children: 2

Simon Beresford-Wylie (born 18 May 1958) is the CEO of Imagination Technologies, a UK based supplier of semiconductor intellectual property. Beresford-Wylie was the CEO of Arqiva. He was the former president and CEO of Nokia Siemens Networks and a member of the group executive board of Nokia Corporation.

Beresford-Wylie is a dual UK-Australian citizen. He is married to Margaret and has two children, Edward and Guy.

== Career ==
Since 1989, Beresford-Wylie held various management positions within Australia's Telstra Corporation's Corporate and Government Business Unit.

In 1995, he became the chief executive officer of Modi Telstra (a joint venture between Telstra Corporation and ModiCorp of India).

Beresford-Wylie joined Nokia in 1998. He became head of Nokia's infrastructure business group in February 2005.

On 22 June 2015, Beresford-Wylie became the CEO of Arqiva.

== Education ==
Simon holds a bachelor's degree in history and geography from the Australian National University. He is a graduate of the Executive Development Program of Stanford University/National University of Singapore.
