= M-Kopa =

Private company in the UK

M-KOPA
- Type: Private company
- Industry: Fintech
- Founded: 2011
- Founders: Nick Hughes, Chad Larson, Jesse Moore
- Headquarters: London, United Kingdom
- Areas served: Kenya, Uganda, Nigeria, Ghana, South Africa
- Products: Smartphones & financial services
- Website: Official website

M-Kopa (M for mobile, kopa is Swahili for borrow, stylized as M-KOPA) is a UK-headquartered emerging market fintech platform that provides affordable smartphones and digital financial services. M-Kopa was launched commercially in 2012 and is headquartered in London. The company is currently operating in Kenya, Nigeria, Ghana, Uganda and South Africa.

M-KOPA uses a financing model based on daily repayments, providing affordable smartphones integrated with financial services that fit with the cash flow of underserved individuals who earn their income on a daily basis.

== History ==
In 2010, Moore and Hughes, with banker Chad Larson, founded the start-up in Nairobi that became M-Kopa the following year. Hughes previously set up and ran M-Pesa at Vodafone, a mobile phone-based money transfer, financing and microfinancing service, where Moore also worked whilst completing his MBA. Larson and Moore were fellow MBA students at Oxford University.

In 2011, M-Kopa raised money with incubation by Signal Point Partners. Backing investors have included Richard Branson, Generation Investment Management, Blue Haven Initiative and LGT Venture Philanthropy, an investment vehicle of the Princely Family of Liechtenstein. M-Kopa was launched commercially in late 2012.

By 2015, it said it had powered 150,000 households in Kenya, Uganda, and Tanzania, with around 10,000 mobile payments made by users on its cloud platform, M-Kopanet, made on a daily basis. It had over $40 million of revenue by 2015. In 2015, M-Kopa estimated that 80 percent of its customers lived on less than $2 a day.

In February 2015, M-Kopa announced a plan to blacklist defaulters on its loans with credit bureaus.

It had connected over 300,000 homes in East Africa to Solar power, as of early January 2016 In 2016, M-Kopa sold 30,000 solar TVs in Kenya, looking to add internet access. By December 2016, the company had sold around 400,000 systems in Kenya, Tanzania, and Uganda since its launch in 2011, under CEO Jesse Moore. As of 2016, there were plans to begin manufacturing all the products in Kenya.

By January 2018, the company had wired at least 500,000 homes, and sold about 90,000 solar rechargeable televisions. In 2018, it was reported that M-Kopa would acquire an additional 500,000 photovoltaic solar panels, under chairman Mugo Kibati, in an agreement with Solinc East Africa. In February 2018, M-Kopa received $10 million in funding from FinDev Canada in a new funding round led by CDC, and including existing shareholders LGT Venture Philanthropy and Generation Investment Management.

In July 2021, M-Kopa announced its expansion to Nigeria. In 2024, the company had extended over $1.5 billion in credit to more than 5 million customers and stated that it employs over 3,000 staff members and 30,000 sales agents across its African markets.

== Business model and products ==
M-KOPA utilises payments data and proprietary AI-driven analytics to create a credit record for each customer to form long-term financial relationships that include digital loans, affordable digital subscriptions and insurance. Customers pay a deposit of KSh. 3,500/= (approx US$35), and then pay 50/= (approx US$0.50) a day for a period of one year, to own the smartphone device. Daily payments are made through M-Pesa, a mobile phone based money system, at about 45 cents a day. This way, in addition to getting their device, customers also slowly off-set the cost of the device.

The company also provides an upgrade products and services that include; smartphones and digital financial services. The company also has a dedicated and ring-fenced R&D unit, M-Kopa Labs, which deploys research grants to test new technology and extensions to the M-Kopa platform

M-Kopa is supported by a number of partners. Mobile network operators—like Safaricom—are partnering with M-Kopa to support mobile money and value-added services. Manufacturers and brands are partnering to provide a platform for market entry, finance and last mile access. Payments companies like Mastercard and challenger banks see the disruptive power of the platform on traditional clicks and mortar banking.

== Awards ==
M-Kopa won the Bloomberg New Energy Finance Award 2014, as well as two awards from the Financial Times, for Technology in Sustainable Finance and Excellence in Sustainable Finance, both in 2013. In 2015, M-Kopa was recognized by Fortune magazine as one of the "Top 50 Companies Changing the World", and won the Zayed Future Energy Award 2015, In February 2016, it was recognised as the Best Mobile Innovation for Emerging Markets at the Global Mobile Awards. M-Kopa was named on MIT Technology Review's 2017 list of "50 Smartest Companies" in June 2017. In March 2016, it emerged boldest at the Financial Times Arcelor Mittal – Boldness in Business Awards in the developing markets category. Fast Company listed M-Kopa in the 2018 edition of the "World's Most Innovative Companies", number four out of 10 in Africa. The company was also named among the global Cleantech 100 companies in 2019.

M-Kopa was listed in the Financial Times' "Africa's Fastest Growing Companies" rankings three years in a row in 2022, 2023, and 2024. The company was also included in TIME' "100 Most Influential Companies" list in 2023 and 2024.
