= Imagination Technologies =

British semiconductor and software design company

Imagination Technologies Group Limited

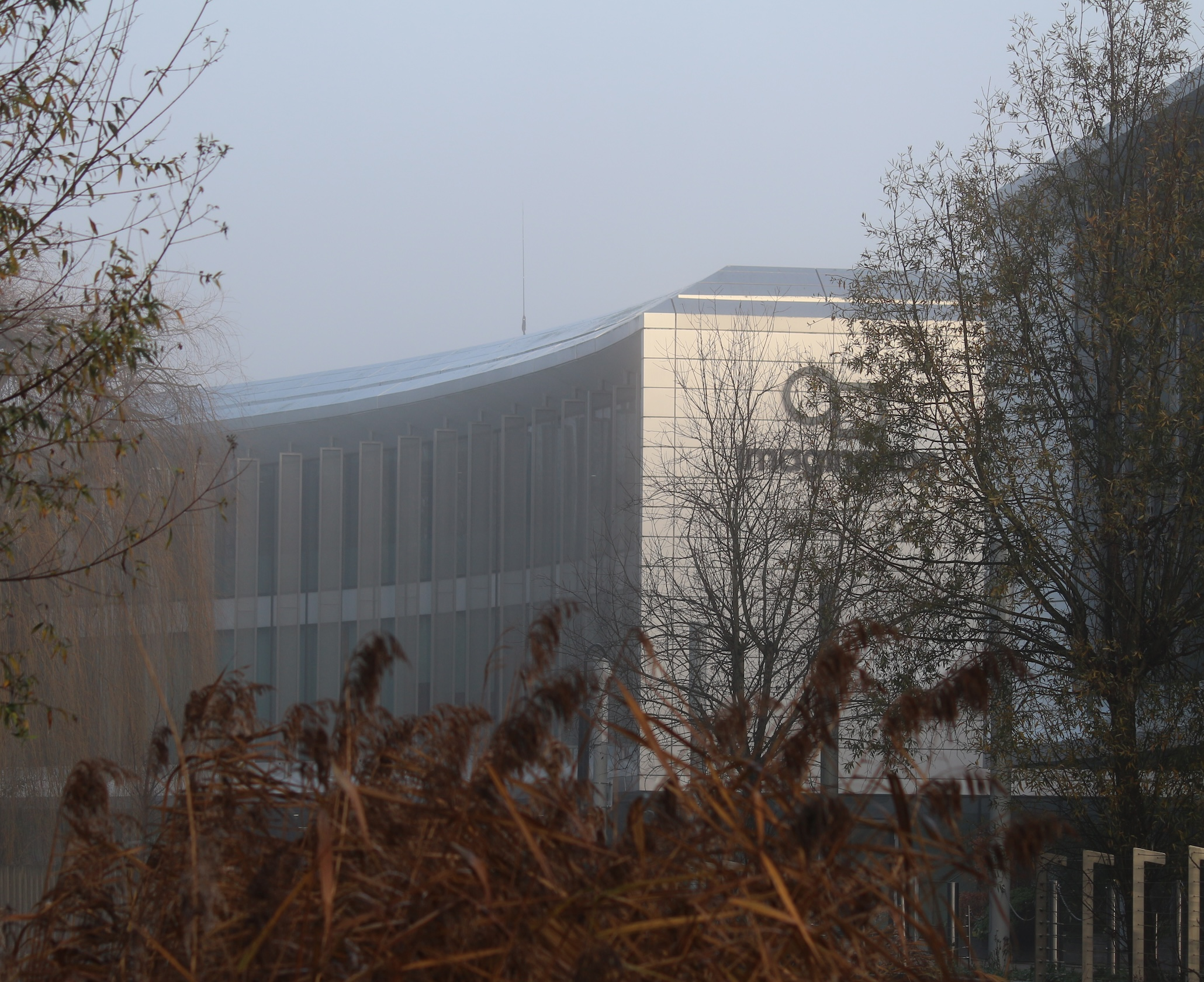
- Office in Kings Langley, UK
- Type: Private
- Industry: Technology
- Founded: 1985; 41 years ago
- Founder: Tony Maclaren
- Headquarters: Kings Langley, England, UK
- Area served: Worldwide
- Key people: Didier Lamouche (CEO)
- Products: Graphics processing unit (GPU) designs
- Revenue: £120.0 million (2016)
- Operating income: £(61.5) million (2016)
- Net income: £(80.6) million (2016)
- Owner: Canyon Bridge Capital Partners
- Number of employees: c. 500 (2020)
- Divisions: PowerVR
- Website: www.imaginationtech.com

Imagination Technologies Group Limited is a British semiconductor and software design company owned by Canyon Bridge Capital Partners, a private equity fund based in Beijing that is ultimately owned by the Chinese government. With its global headquarters in Kings Langley, England, its primary business is in the design of PowerVR graphics processors (GPUs) for AI processing. The company was listed on the London Stock Exchange until it was acquired by Canyon Bridge in November 2017.

== History ==
The company was founded in 1985 by Tony Maclaren, and subsequently led by him as group chief executive, as VideoLogic and originally focused on graphics, sound acceleration, home audio systems, video-capture and video-conferencing systems, making interactive video products for personal computers. It was first listed on the London Stock Exchange in July 1994. The following year it entered into a licensing agreement over its PowerVR technology with NEC (now Renesas) who took a 2.29% stake in the company for £1.6 million and acquired the rights to manufacture and sell the chip. On 2 December 1997, NEC subscribed 2.3 million (1.5%) new shares at a price of 56.5p, taking its total stake to 3.5%. In 1999, the company refocused on intellectual property licensing generally and changed its name to Imagination Technologies.

Hossein Yassaie, who joined the company in 1992, became the company's chief executive officer (CEO) in 1998. On 29 December 2012, Yassaie was awarded a knighthood in the 2013 New Year Honours. The award was given in recognition of his services to technology and innovation.

Since the 1990s, VideoLogic has provided chips for digital television set-top boxes.

On 23 March 2000, Imagination Technologies acquired Ensigma, a private company specialising in digital signal processing, for a maximum consideration of £5 million. On 26 September 2001, Imagination Technologies acquired Cross Products Limited, a company designing and producing development tools for META DSP IP cores and Renesas's SuperH architecture processors under CodeScape brand, for £4.2 million.

In October 2006, Intel Corporation acquired a 2.9% stake in Imagination Technologies for £5.28 million. On 24 November 2008, Imagination Technologies announced a license agreement it signed with a new partner, then undisclosed, for a high-performance version of its PowerVR SGX graphics processor chip: this was later revealed to be Apple. In December 2008, Apple purchased a 3.6% stake in the company for £3.2 million.

In June 2009, it was announced that Intel's stake had increased to 14% after it had acquired 25 million shares. One week later, Intel acquired another 5 million shares from the Saad Group (based in Saudi Arabia), and its shareholding rose to 16.02%. Days later, Apple announced it had subscribed for 2.2m new shares at 142.75p each and made market purchases of another 11.52 million shares, raising its stake to 9.5%; Saad Group, who had held 44.6 million shares i.e. 20.3% of the company as at 30 June 2008, was thought to be the vendor of these shares, and had been reportedly forced to divest after its bank froze its accounts.

On 17 November 2010, Imagination Technologies announced its intention to acquire HelloSoft, one of the world's leading providers of Video and Voice over Internet Protocol and wireless LAN technologies, for a maximum consideration of $47 million. On 14 December 2010, Imagination Technologies acquired Caustic Graphics, developer of hardware/software real-time ray-tracing graphics technology which was founded by a group of former Apple engineers, for $27 million. On 14 December 2011, Imagination Technologies announced that it had signed a licensing agreement with Qualcomm. The company signed an agreement for the display IP from its PowerVR portfolio.

On 3 January 2012, Imagination Technologies announced that it will invest totalling £5 million, in Toumaz Microsystems, a wireless intercom spinout of Toumaz Ltd., and will own 25% of the business. In June 2012, Imagination Technologies acquired Nethra Imaging, a semiconductor and systems company focused on delivering video and imaging solutions. As of November 2012, over 1 billion SOC units had shipped containing cores developed by Imagination Technologies. On 17 December 2012, Imagination Technologies beat Ceva Inc in the race to buy processor technology firm MIPS Technologies with a knockout offer of $100 million.

On 8 February 2016, Imagination Technologies announced that Sir Hossein Yassaie had stepped down from the company after 18 years as CEO. Imagination Technologies had seen over 40 per cent of its market value lost in the past few months, and over 85 per cent since it peaked in 2012, due to its dependence on Apple which had seen slowing iPhone sales. Andrew Heath, a member of Imagination's board of directors and former director of Rolls-Royce, was appointed as interim chief executive before taking the role on a permanent basis on 26 May 2016. Additionally, Imagination announced a restructuring program to cut costs by £15m in the next financial year, and announced its intention to sell its Pure digital radio division.

In March 2016, Apple considered buying Imagination Technologies but never made a formal offer. From 2015 to 2017, despite retaining the licensing agreement, Apple engineered a "brain drain" of Imagination Technologies's personnel, including engineers and executives. Apple also established a new office for chip development in St Albans, close to Imagination Technologies' headquarters.

On 3 April 2017, Imagination Technologies' stock prices fell by 70% after it reported that Apple planned to stop using its intellectual property within its system-on-chips within the next two years. Apple accounted at the time for more than half of the company's revenue. The following month, Imagination Technologies announced that it would enter into a dispute resolution process seeking that Apple license its intellectual property, arguing that Apple "has not presented any evidence to substantiate its assertion that it will no longer require Imagination’s technology, without violating Imagination’s patents, intellectual property, and confidential information". The company also announced that it would sell its MIPS and Ensigma businesses. Imagination Technologies sold MIPS processor rights to Tallwood MIPS Inc in 2017. MIPS Technologies was acquired by Wave Computing in 2018, where "MIPS operates as an IP licensing business unit".

On 15 May 2017, Sondrel announced it had signed an agreement to acquire the IMG Works division.

On 22 June 2017, Imagination Technologies' board of directors announced it was putting the entire company up for sale and, on 25 September 2017, it announced that the company was being acquired by Canyon Bridge, a private equity fund ultimately owned by the Chinese government. In November 2017 the sale to Canyon Bridge was approved in a transaction which valued the business at £550 million (£1.82 per share). Since the sale to Canyon Bridge, there have been security concerns over possible technology transfers to Chinese state-owned enterprises, leading to key executives of Imagination being summoned to appear before the Foreign Affairs Select Committee of the British parliament.

Once the sale was complete CEO Andrew Heath and CFO Guy Millward both departed. The CEO position was taken over by Leo Li; Li was replaced in turn by Ron Black in December 2018.

On 2 January 2020, Imagination Technologies announced a new multi-year license agreement with Apple including access to a wider range of Imagination's IP in exchange for license fees. This deal replaced the prior deal signed on 6 February 2014.

On 5 October 2020, Imagination Technologies announced Simon Beresford-Wylie as its new chief executive officer.

On 30 November 2020, Imagination Technologies announced the sale of its Ensigma Wi-Fi development operations and Wi-Fi IP tech assets to Nordic Semiconductor.

On 8 January 2021, Imagination announced revenues of $125 million for 2020, an increase of 44% on 2019.

On 11 January 2023, Glassdoor listed Imagination as the 16th best place to work in the UK.

In June 2025, it was announced that Didier Lamouche had been appointed as Imagination’s interim CEO.

== Products ==
Imagination Technologies' main focus is the development of GPU architectures. The architectures are then used by other firms for graphical processors such as the Fantasy series from Innosilicon, and FuXi series from Xiang Dixian. The 2023 released IMG DXD GPU IP also support various graphic APIs like DirectX 11 and Vulkan 1.3 as well as Ray Tracing and is aimed at cloud gaming services. The 2019 released A-Series is meant to address a wider range of uses, like in AIoT devices or servers due to being scalable from 1 PPC (pixel-per-clock) to 2 TFLOPS. Their IPs are also used in cars, and were used in the iPhone from 2007 to 2017.

== Whistleblower controversy ==
In 2020, Ron Black, the CEO of Imagination Technologies, was dismissed after raising concerns about a Chinese state-owned investor's attempt to appoint four directors to the board. Black warned that this could lead to the company falling under Chinese government control, raising national security risks and fears of potential misuse of its technology. The UK government intervened to block the appointments. In 2024, an employment tribunal ruled Black’s dismissal was unfair, recognizing his protected disclosures. Legal proceedings for damages are ongoing.

== See also ==
- ARM Holdings
- Tensilica
- ARC International
- Prpl Foundation
