= Hackman (company) =

Finnish company and brand

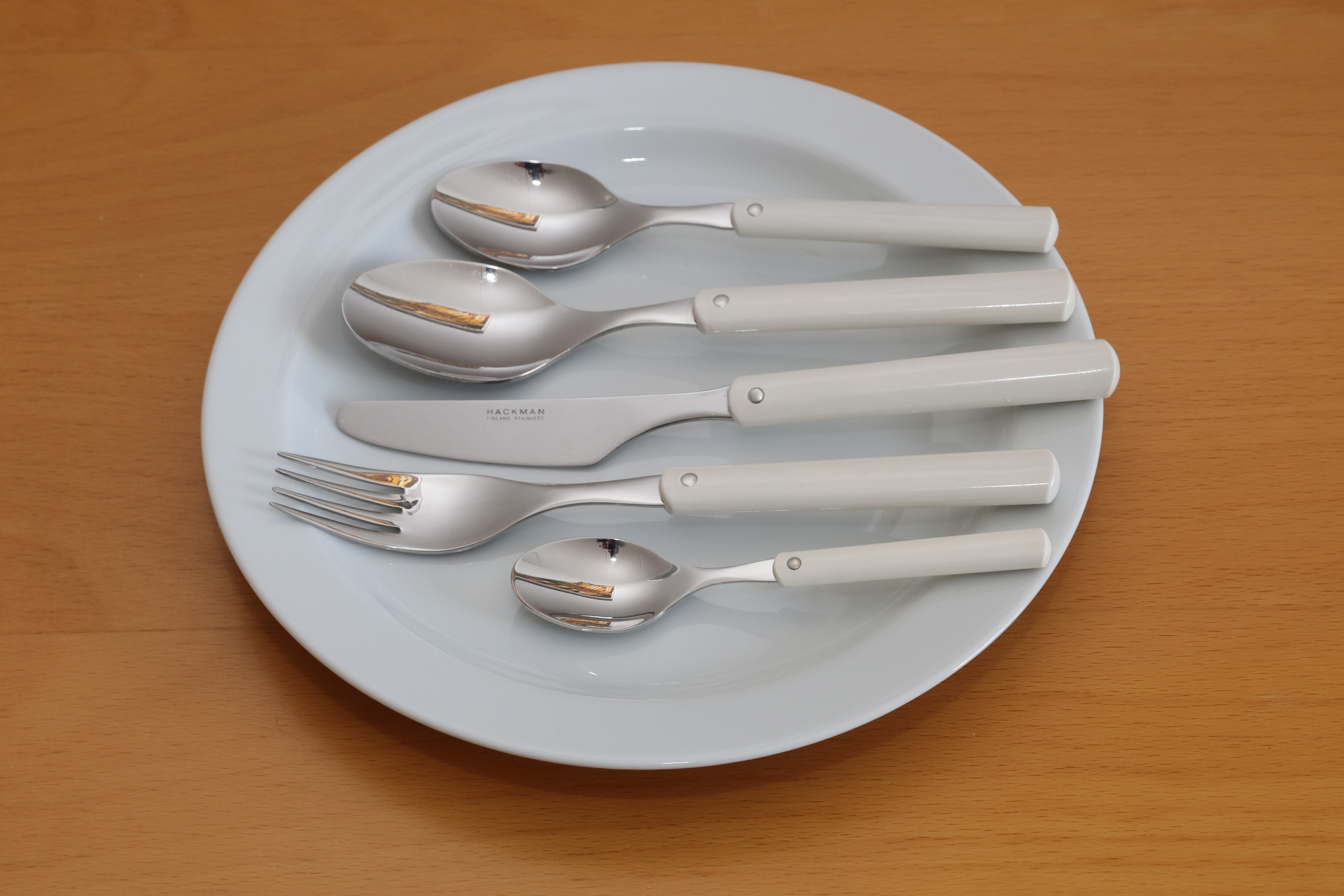
Hackman cutlery

Hackman Oyj was a cutlery and cookware company founded in Finland in 1790. The Hackman brand is now owned by Iittala Group, which was acquired by Fiskars Corporation in 2007.

In a 2008 survey which included both Finnish and international brands, it was the fifth most respected brand among Finnish consumers.

The Hackman butterfly knife (Finnish: Linkkupuukko, "latch-knife") was a type of butterfly knife produced by Hackman. The knife was marketed by Hackman as a retkiveitsi ("camping knife") and later as Eräpuukko ("wilderness puukko"). The knives were also sold in the United States, and some researchers state they were issued by the U.S. Central Intelligence Agency during the Vietnam War.

== History ==
Hackman was founded in 1790 by Johan Friedrich Hackman, a merchant from Bremen, Germany, who established a trading house in Vyborg in what was then part of Russia. Initially engaged in trade, particularly timber, salt, herring, and other commodities, Hackman quickly grew to become one of the foremost merchant enterprises in Eastern Finland, expanding its operations into sawmilling and shipping to support its timber exports.

In the latter half of the 19th century, Hackman diversified beyond timber and shipping, investing in sugar refining, soap and candle manufacturing, and acquiring industrial sites that enabled further expansion. In 1876, the company started cutlery and fine metalwork manufacturing at Nurmi, near Vyborg. In 1891, Hackman established a factory at Sorsakoski in Leppävirta, which became central to the firm's metalworking and cutlery production. When the Sorsakoski sawmill burned down in 1897, Hackman shifted its focus to metalwork, and by 1902, the company started manufacturing single-piece forged cutlery.

In the latter half of the 20th century, Hackman increasingly focused on its design-led consumer goods divisions, acquiring major Nordic brands in ceramics, porcelain, and glass. Key acquisitions included Arabia in 1990, Rörstrand-Gustavsberg, and Iittala-Nuutajärvi, which were consolidated under Hackman Tabletop and then further merged to form Hackman Designor in 1994. The company divested its sawmill operations in the early 1990s to concentrate on housewares, flatware, and professional kitchen equipment.

At the start of the 21st century, Hackman restructured into two main divisions: Designor, focusing on Scandinavian-designed home products, and Metos, which produced professional kitchen systems. In 2004, Hackman was acquired by the Italian Ali Group, after which its consumer brands, including Hackman, Arabia, and Iittala, were integrated into the Iittala Group. Subsequently, in 2007, Iittala Group (and thus Hackman and its related brands) was acquired by Fiskars Corporation.
