= Slush (event) =

Startup and investor event in Helsinki, Finland

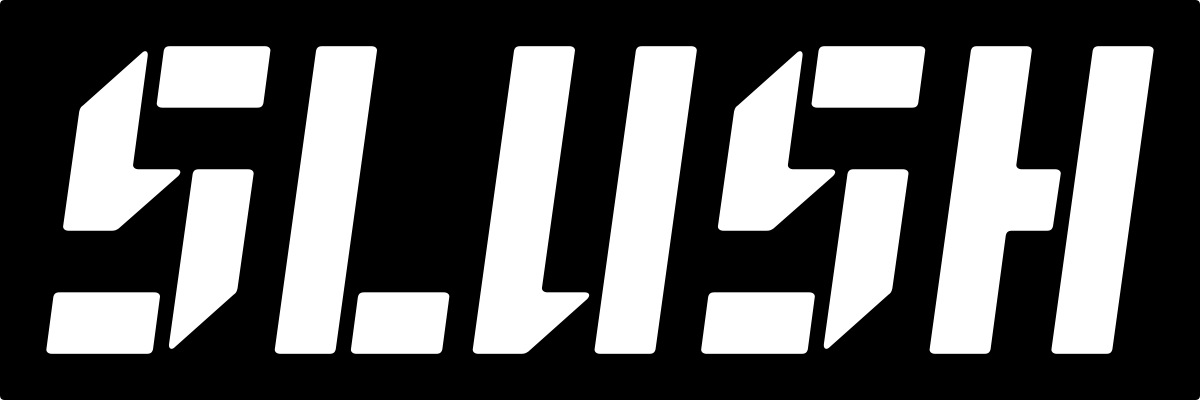
- Status: Active
- Genre: Technology, startups
- Venue: Messukeskus Helsinki, Expo and Convention Centre
- Location: Helsinki
- Country: Finland
- Inaugurated: 2008
- Attendance: 13,000 (2025)
- Website: www.slush.org

Slush is a startup and tech event, held by Slush Oy company, annually in Helsinki, Finland. Slush facilitates meetings between the founders of startups and investors such as venture capitalists, accomplished with events such as matchmaking and pitching competitions. Slush aims to build a worldwide startup community. In 2021, Slush brought together 8,800 attendees from around the world to participate together in this global networking festival.

Since 2015, Slush also run events throughout the world. These include previous events such as Slush Tokyo, Slush Shanghai and Slush Small Talks events. Since 2021, Slush'D has served as the primary avenue for international offshoots of the main Helsinki event.

Slush has created various products and resources available year-round to support and inform founders and investors. Among these products are Soaked by Slush, a startup media platform established in 2019, and Node by Slush, a startup and investor community established a year later.

Slush Oy made a turnover of 11.2 million euros in 2024, with its profit being 1.1 million euros.

== History ==
Slush was founded in 2008 by Helene Auramo, Ville Vesterinen, Kai Lemmetty, Peter Vesterbacka and Timo Airisto. The event has grown from a small event with a few hundred visitors to an internationally known event attracting more than 10,000 visitors from around the world.

=== At Kaapelitehdas, 2009-2015 ===
Slush was held for the first time in 2008 at Kulttuuritehdas Korjaamo. In 2009, the event moved to Kaapelitehdas. For the first three years, the event was aimed at local entrepreneurs and investors. Between 2008 and 2010, the number of participants increased from 250 to 500. The winners of the Slush pitching competitions in those years were Illtags, Sibesonke and Dealmachine. The 2011 event had 1,500 participants, 150 growth companies and 15 private equity and venture capital firms. The pitching competition was won by Ovelin (now Yousician), a developer of music-related technologies.

In 2011, Miki Kuusi became the CEO, and together with Atte Hujanen and Jenni Kääriäinen organized the event at Kaapelitehdas, with 1,500 attendees. The event was staffed mainly by student volunteers from Aaltoes (Aalto Entrepreneurship Society) of Aalto University.

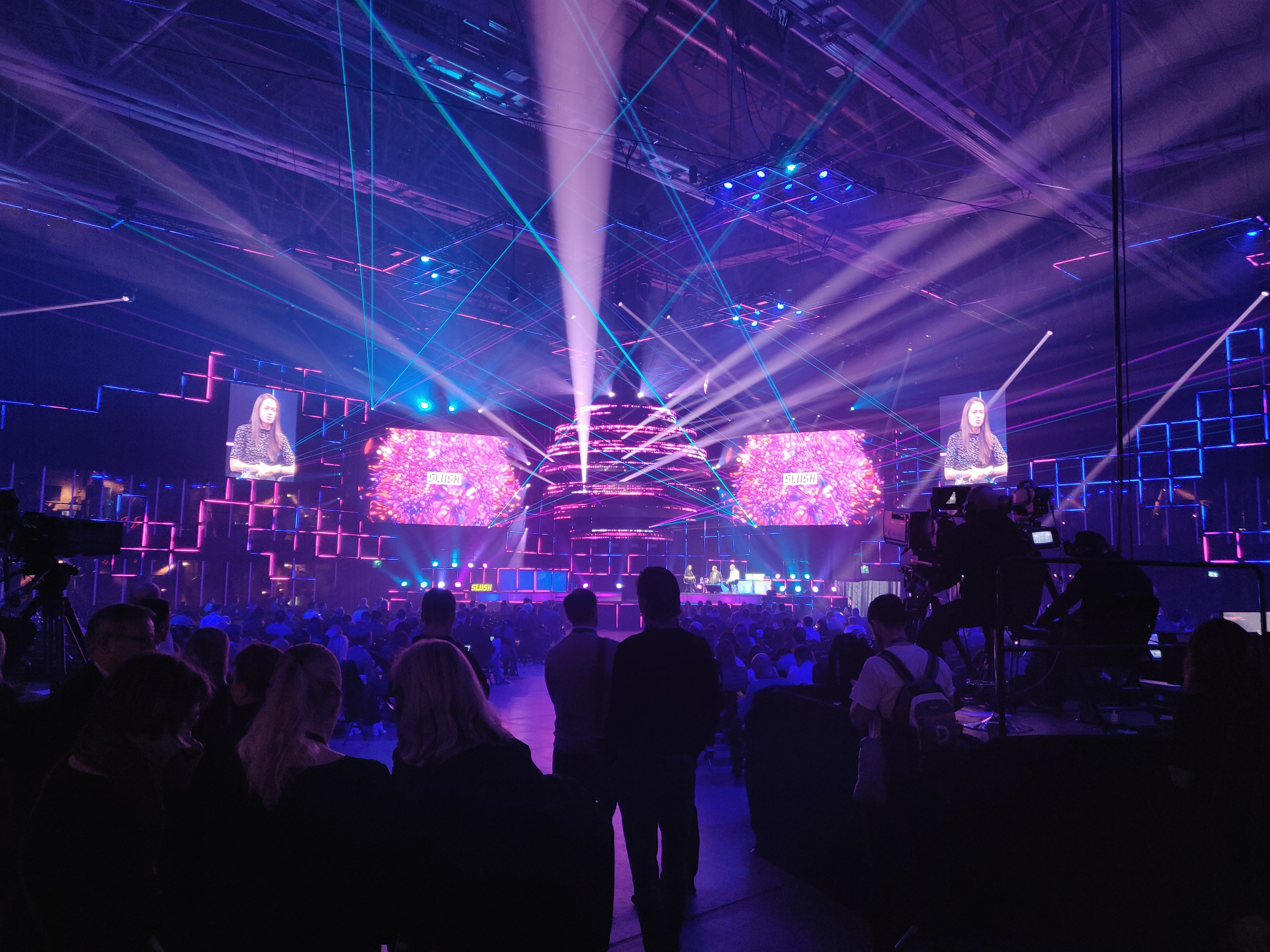
Slush 2019

In 2012, 3,500 people, 560 growth companies and 41 private equity firms participated in Slush. FishBrain, the social media aimed at fishermen, won the pitching competition of the year.

In 2013, Slush gathered a total of 7,000 people, 1,200 growth companies and 120 private equity companies at Kaapelitehdas. The event received a great deal of international attention and was listed in The New York Times and The Wall Street Journal, among others. Speakers at the event included Toomas Hendrik Ilves (former president of Estonia), John Riccitiello (CEO of Electronic Arts), and Niklas Zennström (Founder of Skype).

The 2013 pitching competition was won by Weekdone, which is developing a job tracking tool for teams.

=== At Messukeskus, 2014 - present ===
In 2014, 14,000 people from 79 countries visited Slush. The event was attended by about 1,400 growth companies, 750 investors, 700 suppliers and 140 private equity firms. Speakers at the event included Martin Lorentzon (founder of Spotify), Wang Yang (Deputy Prime Minister of China), Leland Melvin (astronaut at NASA), and Esa-Pekka Salonen (conductor and composer). Nokia unveiled its first Android tablet, the Nokia N1.

The event in 2014 was the largest technical production in Finnish history, surpassing the Eurovision Song Contest held in Finland in 2007. The 2014 pitching competition was won by Enbrite.ly, which develops internet traffic management services.

Slush 2015 was held from 11 to 12. November. Slush Hacks was held for the first time with the participation of Ultrahack, Junction, Industryhack and the AEC (Architecture, Engineering, Construction) Hackathon. The winners of each challenge were able to pitch their ideas on the Slush stage and the best idea / team won €20,000.

Slush received the President of the Republic's Internationalization Award in November 2015.

In 2016, Slush was held from November 30 to December 1. At the Helsinki Fair Center. A new sister event was Slush Music, which was expected to bring 1,500 technology and music professionals to the Cable Factory for one day. Slush, in cooperation with Finnair, organized a direct scheduled flight from San Francisco to Helsinki. The nickname "Nerd bird" is also used for scheduled flights. The event also featured "The badass banner," which went viral. The banner said, "Nobody in their right mind would go to Helsinki in November, except you, you badass. Welcome"

The 2017 event was held on November 30 and December 1. The main trends were analytics and artificial intelligence. The 2018 Slush was attended by 20,000 visitors. The content of the event sought to highlight the actors and background influencers of technology companies, which are not usually presented in public. Experienced entrepreneurs as well as executives such as Werner Vogels (Amazon's CTO), spoke at the event.

In 2019, Slush grew to 25,000 participants and Slush also organized major side events on product management and game development, among other things. The event featured 200 speakers, including investor Michael Moritz and Stripe founder John Collison.

== Event summary by year ==
Edition	Year	Dates	Theme(s)	Notable speakers	Attendance
1st	2008	Nov 24	N/A	Risto Siilasmaa, Ilkka Paananen, Michael "Monty" Widenius	250
2nd	2009	Nov 23–24	N/A	Anssi Vanjoki, Jani Penttinen, Andreas Weigend, Risto Siilasmaa, Jussi Pajunen	600
3rd	2010	Oct 21-22	The premier entrepreneurship event in Northern Europe	Mårten Mickos, Burton Lee, Ilkka Paananen, Taneli Tikka, Peter Vesterbacka, Jan-Erik Nyrövaara	400
4th	2011	March 1	N/A	Sonali De Rycker, Mikko Hyppönen, Timo Vuorensola	1,500
5th	2012	Nov 21–22	N/A	Marko Ahtisaari, Serguei Beloussov, John Lindfors, Aydin Senkut	3,500
6th	2013	Nov 13–14	N/A	Taizo Son, Jian Wang, Niklas Zennström, Taavet Hinrikus	7,000
7th	2014	Nov 18–19	N/A	Wang Yang, Martin Lorentzon, Esa-Pekka Salonen, Leland Melvin	14,200
8th	2015	Nov 11–12	Digital healthcare & life sciences Innovation in developing countries Entertainment & media	Caterina Fake, Martti Ahtisaari, Niklas Zennström, Ilkka Paananen	N/A
9th	2016	Nov 30 – Dec 1	The Mind of an Entrepreneur	Chris Sacca, Steve Jurvetson, Joel Spolsky, Sebastian Siemiatkowski, Danae Ringelmann (co-founder of Indiegogo)	17,500
10th	2017	Nov 30 – Dec 1	A Call for Solvers: how entrepreneurship can solve the biggest problems of the world	Al Gore, Martin Lau, Daniel Ek	20,000
11th	2018	Dec 4–5	Arrival	Werner Vogels, Justin Rosenstein, Julia Hartz	20,000
12th	2019	Nov 21–22	Futurism Re-Imagined	Michael Moritz, John Collison	25,000
13th	2020	N/A	Cancelled due to the COVID-19 pandemic	N/A	N/A
14th	2021	Dec 1–2	Entrepreneurial Renaissance	Tony Xu, Renate Nyborg (CEO of Tinder), Tony Fadell, Luciana Lixandru	8,800
15th	2022	Nov 17–18	Break of Dawn	Sanna Marin, Max Levchin, Ev Williams, Andrey Khusid	12,000
16th	2023	Nov 30 – Dec 1	Building to last	Tony Xu, Pieter Van Der Does, Severin Hacker, Claire Hughes Johnson	13,000
17th	2024	Nov 20–21	Metamorphosis	Thomas Wolf (Co-founder of Hugging Face), Milda Mitkute, Dylan Field, Qasar Younis	13,000
18th	2025	Nov 19–20	Ground State	Anton Osika, Robert Gentz, Luciana Lixandru, Max Junestrand	13,000
19th	2026	Nov 18–19	Bet on Europe	Reid Hoffman, Elina Berglund, Alexander Stubb, Jessica Livingston	12,000

== See also ==
- Assembly (demoparty)
- OMR Festival
