= Polymail =

- Release: July 20, 2016; 10 years ago
- Platform: macOS, iOS, Windows, web browsers
- Website: polymail.io

Polymail is an email application for macOS, iOS, Windows, and web browsers known for its clean interface and additional features atop the Gmail platform. It publicly released in July 2016.

== Features ==
Polymail adds several new features atop those associated with standard email. Its email tracking shows which recipients have received and opened the email. Users can also set reminders for when to follow up on an email and schedule when they want their emails to send, if not immediately. The app also holds emails briefly so that users can "undo send". Polymail will also show profiles for the user's recipients and senders by associating those email addresses with those used in other social network services.

== Development ==
The apps for macOS and iOS platforms released to the public on July 20, 2016.

== Reception ==
Matthew Hussey of The Next Web wrote in December 2015 that Polymail was the first email app he genuinely loved, and praised its improvements upon Gmail's interface.
