= PrintFriendly =

Browser extension and website

- Original author(s): Taylor Norrish
- Initial release: 2009
- Stable release: 3.9.12 / 15 April 25
- Available in: 53 languages
- Type: Browser extension Website
- Website: www.printfriendly.com

PrintFriendly, also known as PrintFriendly & PDF, is a free browser extension and website that creates printable versions of webpages. It was created by Taylor Norrish and is available on Google Chrome, Firefox, Safari, and Microsoft Edge.

== Functionality ==
PrintFriendly takes webpages and generates printable versions of them by isolating text content and inline images while formatting them to fit the size of standard printer paper. Users can also configure the printable versions to not have certain elements at all by clicking them, as well as modify size, margins, color, and layout of existing elements. In addition to printing, PrintFriendly outputs can be downloaded as PDF files or other file formats, as well as sent through email.

PrintFriendly can be installed as a browser extension, after which users can press its icon to start converting webpages to printable versions. Additionally, it has a website where webpage URLs can be inputted to generate and customize printable versions; the website works for both computers and smartphones and provides various other file conversion tools.

== History ==
PrintFriendly was created by Taylor Norrish in 2009. By 2012, it had over 21,000 downloads on Google Chrome alone. As of January 2025, the Google Chrome extension reported 1,000,000 users.

Since its release, PrintFriendly has been spotlighted and recommended by websites like Mashable, Lifehacker, Fast Company, BuzzFeed, and Mental Floss. Entrepreneur and The Next Web have specifically recommended it for users who maintain blogs and/or email lists. PC World called it a "must-have addition to Chrome."
