= SportSetter =

Finnish fitness app company

- Type: Private
- Industry: Fitness
- Founded: December 2012
- Founders: Niko Karstikko
- Headquarters: London, England

SportSetter is a Finnish startup focused on a mobile-first fitness discovery and booking service. The company was founded by Niko Karstikko and Trevor Ferguson in Helsinki, Finland in 2012. Users are presented with a curated list of things to do, including last-minute classes and courses, which can be booked direct on the app or via the website.

== History ==
SportSetter was founded in Helsinki, Finland, in 2012 by Niko Karstikko and Trevor Ferguson. The company launched with a subscription model, offering users a number of passes for various fitness activities for a monthly fee. In April 2013, the company announced it had raised €400,000 in angel funding to expand its team and partnerships. By this time, it had already established an office in New York City. The company received a further €200,000 in funding in April 2014.

In 2015, the company changed its business model, moving from a monthly subscription service to a model that connected users with free trials for fitness classes. After a trial, users could purchase future passes and subscriptions through the app. In September 2015, SportSetter announced a $1 million seed round led by Reaktor Fund, with the stated purpose of funding an expansion into the UK market and developing an Android version of its app.

SportSetter launched in London in May 2016. In the autumn of 2016, the company was acquired by The Orange Company, the Finnish parent group of the corporate benefits provider Smartum. Following the acquisition, SportSetter was rebranded as Polku.

The UK entity, SPORTSETTER LTD, was officially dissolved in May 2017. The Finnish company, SportSetter Oy, ceased operations after its last reported fiscal year ending in December 2017, in which it had a turnover of €183,000 and a loss of €806,000.

== Mechanics ==
Users of SportSetter can login each day and are given a selection of fitness locations, classes, pop-up bootcamps and other activities. Users can then trial activities for free before making a payment. Once a user has found an activity, they can make a purchase through the app or on the website, with users also given the opportunity to share their purchase via social media.

Activities are selected by hand and the company is working on advanced personalisation algorithms. Things like Facebook likes and the users location, browsing behaviour, tag selection and the browsing behaviour of their friends affect which activities can be highlighted.

During a TechCrunch interview, it was stated that SportSetter would expand to London in 2016 and launched with over 120 locations across the city.

Initially, SportSetter was only available on Apple's iOS, but was later available on SportSetter.com.
