= Top Chef Suomi =

Finnish cooking television series

- Starring: Pipsa Hurmerinta; Pia Kämppi; Hans Välimäki
- Country of origin: Finland
- No. of episodes: 10

Production
- Executive producer: TBA
- Running time: 45 min (excluding commercials)

Original release
- Network: Sub
- Release: January 26, 2011 – present

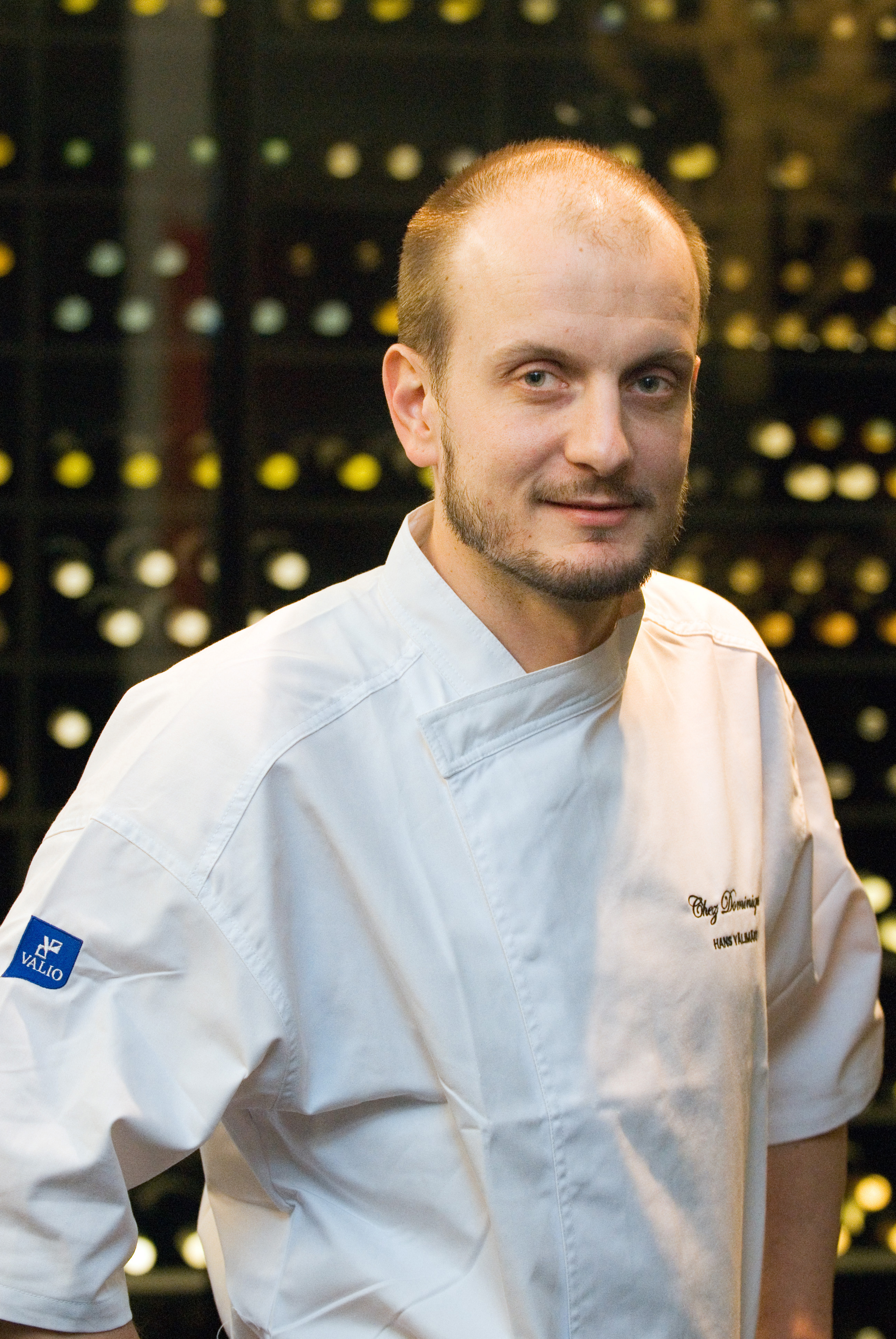
Hans Välimäki was the head judge of Top Chef Suomi.

Top Chef Suomi is a Finnish cooking reality show on Sub based on the American television series Top Chef. Auditions for the series were held in autumn 2010 and 12 contestants were chosen. The programme is hosted by model and restaurant chef Pipsa Hurmerinta The head judge for the competition is Finland's most renowned chef Hans Välimäki. The other judge is business group manager of Royal Ravintolat Pia Kämppi. Top Chef season 5 runner up Stefan Richter has made an appearance as a special guest judge for the first four episodes. The show is produced by Solar Television Oy. The show is renewed for a second season, which is expected to premiere in either fall 2011 or in spring 2012.

The winner of Top Chef Suomi Akseli Herlevi received a culinary travel grant to top restaurants worldwide worth €10,000, a contract for a cookbook with the publishing company Tammi, a Samsung flatscreen TV and home entertainment system worth €8,000.

== Contestants ==
12 chefs competed in the first season. Names, ages, and hometowns below are from the Sub website. In elimination order, the contestants were:

- Mic Vettenranta 33 — Resides in: Helsinki
- Bianca McKell 32 — Resides in: Helsinki
- Jussi Raunio 22 — Resides in: Espoo
- Ulla Liukkonen 54 — Resides in: Lappeenranta
- Jani Pajala 34 — Resides in: Helsinki
- Arto Lappalainen 23 — Resides in: Tampere
- Markus Kauppinen 28 — Resides in: Helsinki
- Maija Silvennoinen 49 — Resides in: Kangasala
- Annina Roiha 22 — Resides in: Simpele/Helsinki
- Mika Jokela 40 — Resides in: Turenki
- Samu Koskinen 39 — Resides in: Helsinki
- Akseli Herlevi 24 — Resides in: Hyvinkää

== Contestant progress ==
Episode	1	2	3 ^{1}	4	5	6	7 ^{2}	8	9	10
Quickfire; Winner	Arto	Akseli	Maija	Samu	Mika	Markus; Mika; Samu	NONE	Annina	Mika	NONE
Akseli	IN	IN	IN (+)	WIN	HIGH	HIGH	LOW	WIN	HIGH	WINNER
Samu	HIGH	WIN	IN (-)	IN	HIGH	WIN	LOW	IN	WIN	RUNNER UP
Mika	IN	HIGH	IN (-)	LOW	IN	IN	WIN ^{3}	LOW	OUT	
Annina	WIN	IN	IN (+)	IN	LOW	LOW	WIN ^{3}	HIGH	OUT	
Maija	HIGH	LOW	IN (-)	LOW	IN	HIGH	WIN ^{3}	OUT		
Markus	IN	LOW	WIN	IN	WIN	LOW	OUT			
Arto	IN	IN	IN (-)	HIGH	LOW	OUT				
Jani	LOW	HIGH	IN (+)	HIGH	OUT					
Ulla	IN	IN	IN (+)	OUT						
Jussi	LOW	IN	OUT							
Bianca	IN	OUT								
Mic	OUT									

(WINNER) The chef won the season and was crowned Top Chef.
(RUNNER-UP) The chef was a runner-up for the season.
(WIN) The chef won that episode's Elimination Challenge.
(HIGH) The chef was selected as one of the top entries in the Elimination Challenge, but did not win.
(LOW) The chef was selected as one of the bottom entries in the Elimination Challenge, but was not eliminated.
(OUT) The chef lost that week's Elimination Challenge and was out of the competition.
(IN) The chef neither won nor lost that week's Elimination Challenge. They also were not up to be eliminated.
IN (+) The chef won a pair or team challenge but was not chosen as one of the judges' favorites.
IN (-) The chef lost a pair or team challenge but was not selected as one of the judges' least favorites.

^Note 1: Each entire team was called in for judging, thus there were no top or bottom individual team members.
^Note 2: There was no Quickfire Challenge in this episode.
^Note 3: Team Ravintola M.M.M. won the challenge, thus there was no one individual winner.

== Episodes ==
Each episode includes two challenges. The Tulikoe or Quickfire Challenge is a short, simple challenge with a varying reward each week; in the initial episodes of the season, it usually guarantees the winner immunity from being sent home that week. The Pudotushaaste or Elimination Challenge is a more complex challenge that determines who goes home. One or more guest judges join the show each week to evaluate both the Quickfire and Elimination challenges. Each week's elimination is announced in a segment called "Judges' Table."

=== Episode 1: Who's Who? (Kuka on kuka?) ===
- Quickfire Challenge: The contestants are asked to make an amuse bouche using only the food items and utensils at the buffet table for their welcome party
  - Top: Arto, Samu, Maija
  - Bottom: Aninna, Mic, Ulla
    - WINNER: Arto (Hot smoked salmon, Parma Ham and Fish Roe on toasted rye bread)
- Elimination Challenge: The contestants were asked in advance to say what their favourite ingredient to work with is and they must now show why.
  - At Judges' Table, Annina, Samu and Maija were selected as the judges' favorites
  - At Judges' Table, Mic, Jussi and Jani were selected as the judges' least favorites
    - WINNER: Annina (Pan Roasted Pike-Perch, Lentils, Jerusalem Artichoke Purée with a Beurre Blanc)
    - ELIMINATED: Mic (Duck Breast Two Ways, Traditional and in a Pyttipannu)
- Guest Judges: Stefan Richter
- First aired 26 January 2011

=== Episode 2: Storm in the Aquarium (Myrsky akvaariossa) ===
- Quickfire Challenge: Each chef receives a whole pike and must fillet it and prepare a dish in 45min.
  - Top: Akseli, Mika, Jussi
  - Bottom: Bianca, Samu, Maija
    - WINNER: Akseli (Butter Poached Pike, Potato Purée with Fish Roe Smetana)
- Elimination Challenge: In the Top Chef kitchen, the chefs must prepare a seafood dish in 1 hour.
  - At Judges' Table, Samu, Jani, Mika were selected as the judges' favorites
  - At Judges' Table, Maija, Bianca, Markus were selected as the judges' least favorites
    - WINNER: Samu (Soy Glazed Norway Lobster, Sea Urchin Roe with a Sake Sauce)
    - ELIMINATED: Bianca (Roasted Red Pepper and King Crab Risotto with Shrimp Ceviche Crostini)
- Guest Judges: Stefan Richter
- First aired 2 February 2011

=== Episode 3: Making Headlines (Etusivu uusiksi) ===
- Quickfire Challenge: The chefs are given 45 minutes to prepare a dessert using chocolate as the main ingredient.
  - Top: Akseli, Samu, Maija
  - Bottom: Annina, Markus, Jani
    - WINNER: Maija (Chocolate Marquise and Pistachio Creme)
- Elimination Challenge: The chefs in a team challenge must prepare a buffet table for a Sub press conference with 200 guests taking ecology and ethics into account. Each team receives €900 and 2 hours prep time. As quickfire winner, Maija gets to choose her team members.
  - Blue Team
    - Maija: Baltic Herring Poached in Allspice Flavoured Broth; Vispipuuro with a Vanilla Sauce and Oatmeal Cookie
    - Jussi: Honey and Rosemary Glazed Root Vegetables with Horseradish Crème
    - Mika: Mushroom Mousse on Crispbread
    - Samu: Jellied Whitefish Tartare
    - Arto: Rillette of Pork Neck with Red Onion Jam
  - Red Team:
    - Annina: Pea Soup Shot; Cold Smoked Reindeer Tartare
    - Akseli: Cold Smoked Salmon Mousse, on Caramalised Rustic Bread and "Granny's Cucumber"; Blueberry Pie
    - Markus: Perch Croquette, Fennel Salad with Herb Mayonnaise
    - Jani: Filet of Beef, Mushroom Salad and Smoked Celery Purée
    - Ulla: Potato Bread "Lepuska" filled with Spinach
- At Judges' Table, the Red Team was selected as the judges' favorite team
- At Judges' Table, the Blue Team was selected as the judges' least favorite team
    - WINNER: Markus
    - ELIMINATED: Jussi
- Guest Judges: Stefan Richter
- First aired 9 February 2011

=== Episode 4: Shake, Cattle and Roll (Rockia ja rotukarjaa) ===
- Quickfire Challenge: Each chef must prepare a fast food dish in 45min.
  - Top: Mika, Akseli, Samu
  - Bottom: Ulla, Arto, Annina
    - WINNER: Samu (Bunless Duck Liver Burger with Truffle Cole Slaw)
- Elimination Challenge: The chefs must prepare a dish from Finnish domestic livestock. As Quickfire winner, Samu chooses lamb neck. The rest of the chefs draw knives to assign meats.
  - Annina: Rack of Pork
  - Maija: Beef Flank
  - Jani: Pork Flank
  - Ulla: Sirloin of Beef
  - Akseli: Rack of Lamb
  - Markus: Lamb Shank
  - Arto: Pork Shank
  - Mika: Lamb Shoulder
- At Judges' Table, Jani, Akseli, Arto were selected as the judges' favorites
- At Judges' Table, Ulla, Maija, Mika were selected as the judges' least favorites
  - WINNER: Akseli (Rack of Lamb with Paprika Bulgur, Garlic Purée and Coffee Sauce)
  - ELIMINATED: Ulla (Roasted Sirloin, Mushroom and Potato Croquette with Red Wine Sauce)
- Guest Judges: Maija Vilkkumaa, Mikko Koskonen, Stefan Richter
- Original Airdate: 16 February 2011

=== Episode 5: Hungry Athletes (Nälkäiset urheilijat) ===
- Quickfire Challenge: The chefs must pair a dish with a beer appropriate for a gastropub in 45 minutes, The chefs draw knives to decide which beer goes to whom:
  - Akseli: Krušovické černé
  - Annina: Newcastle Brown Ale
  - Markus: Murphy's Strout
  - Maija: Gourmet Vaalea
  - Jani: Gourmet Tumma
  - Mika: Sol
  - Arto: Affligem
  - Samu: Eidelweiss
    - Top: Mika, Jani, Maija
    - Bottom: Akseli, Markus, Samu
  - WINNER: Mika (Garlic Soup, Shrimp Ceviche and "Chili Tacos")
- Elimination Challenge: Prepare lunch for the hockey team Jokerit at Hartwall Arena before a match. The meal must be rich in carbohydrates and protein, low in fat and not heavily spiced.
- At Judges' Table, Samu, Akseli, Markus were selected as the judges' favorites
- At Judges' Table, Arto, Annina, Jani were selected as the judges' least favorites
  - WINNER: Markus (Sesame Roasted Sea Trout, Herb Yogurt Raita and Humus)
  - ELIMINATED: Jani (Fresh Pasta Tomato Lasagne)
- Elimination Challenge Prize: The top three get a private viewing of the match in the skybox.
- Guest Judges: Eeva-Liisa "Eve" Vaittinen, Marko Kauppinen
- Original Airdate: 23 February 2011

=== Episode 6: Classic Drama (Klassista draamaa) ===
- Quickfire Challenge: The chefs draw knives and are split into teams for a "broken telephone" challenge. Arto draws a blank knife which entitles him to be a judge. Each team member only gets 10 minutes of cooking time. The challenge starts with one chef starting a dish and after 10 minutes a whistle is blown and the next chef must continue cooking the dish. The chefs that is waiting to cook is blindfolded. The teams and in the order in which the chefs cook are:
  - Blue Team
    - Markus
    - Samu
    - Mika
  - Red Team
    - Maija
    - Annina
    - Akseli
  - WINNING TEAM: Blue Team (Beef Hereford and Warm Salad)
- Elimination Challenge: The chefs draw knives for a classic dish to present to food writer Juha Virkki, restaurant critic and author Tuomas Vimma and Anna magazine editor-in-chief Hanna Jensen. The chefs must recreate the classic while preserving its food culture history. The chefs are given 2 hours cooking time to complete the challenge.
  - Akseli: Sole Meuniére
  - Annina: Bouillabaisse
  - Arto: Lobster Thermidor
  - Maija: Beef Wellington
  - Markus: Liver A L’Anglaise
  - Mika: Pike-Perch Walewska
  - Samu: Tournedos Rossini
- At Judges' Table, Maija, Samu and Akseli were selected as the judges' favorites
- At Judges' Table, Arto, Annina and Markus were selected as the judges' least favorites
  - WINNER: Samu
  - ELIMINATED: Arto
- Guest Judges: Juha Virkki
- Original Airdate: 2 March 2011

=== Episode 7: Restaurant Wars (Ravintolasota) ===
- Quickfire Challenge: None
- Elimination Challenge: For Restaurant Wars, the chefs draw knives and Maija and Samu get to be team leaders and select their team members. Each team gets €2,000 to shop at K-citymarket.
  - Lemström: (Samu, Akseli, Markus)
    - First Course: Smoked and Braised Salmon or Roasted Beetroot, Poached Egg and Heidi Cheese
    - Second Course: Elk Topside, Beef Shoulder and Bean Ragout or Vaasa Wild Whitefish, Miso Vegetables in Ginger Butter Sauce
    - Third Course: Chocolate Ganache, Lemongrass and Salted Peanut Ice Cream or Lime Posset
  - Ravintola M.M.M.: (Maija, Mika, Annina)
    - Amuse Bouche: Freshwater Whitefish Roe, Smetana and Potato Crêpe
    - First Course: Poached Pike-Perch, Pea Purée and Malt Bread
    - Second Course: Reindeer Fillet, Brown Mushroom Sauce, Potato Fondant, Parsnip Purée and Roasted Root Vegetables
    - Third Course: Cloudberry Parfait, Sabayon Sauce and Blueberry Sorbet
- At Judges' Table, Team Ravintola M.M.M. was selected as the judges' favorites
- At Judges' Table, Team Lemström was selected as the judges' least favourites
  - WINNER: Team Ravintola M.M.M.
  - ELIMINATED: Markus
- Guest Judges: Olli Vuori
- Original Airdate: 9 March 2011

=== Episode 8: Champagne and Small Surprises (Sampanjaa ja pikku yllätyksiä) ===
- Quickfire Challenge: The chefs are given 20 minutes to create a cocktail.
  - WINNER: Annina ("Blueberry Dream": Vanila Blueberry Cocktail with Champagne Foam)
- Elimination Challenge: The chefs must prepare two savoury dishes and one sweet dish for a fashion show cocktail party for about 50 guests. The dishes must also match Lanson Champagne Brut Black Label.
- At Judges' Table, Annina and Akseli were selected as the judges' favorites
- At Judges' Table, Mika and Maija were selected as the judges' least favorites
  - WINNER: Akseli (Hereford Carpaccio; Salmon Sashimi; Strawberry Mascarpone Macaroon)
  - ELIMINATED: Maija (Salmon in Filo; Marinated Ox Tartare; Sesame "Lehikäinen")
- Guest Judges: Niko Autti, Essi Avellan
- Original Airdate: 16 March 2011

=== Episode 9: The Steel Hardens in the Fire (Tulessa teräskin karaistuu) ===
- Quickfire Challenge: The chefs go to Porvoo to Kannonnokka and must prepare lunch for the hunters in 1 1/2 hours. The chef draw knives to see which game meat goes to whom:
  - Annina: Duck
  - Mika: Willow Grouse
  - Samu: Pheasant
  - Akseli: Grey Partridge
    - WINNER: Mika (Roasted Willow Grouse Breast and Jerusalem Artichoke Ragout)
- Elimination Challenge: Back in the Top Chef Kitchen, The chefs must prepare a meal in two hours from the hunters' catch. Mika, as Elimination Challenge winner, gets to choose first. The others choose in the order from best to worst in the Elimination Challenge.
  - Mika: Elk Fillet
  - Samu: Wild Boar Fillet
  - Akseli: Wild Boar Kassler
  - Annina: Elk Topside
    - At Judges' Table, Akseli and Samu were selected as the judges' favorites
    - At Judges' Table, Annina and Mika were selected as the judges' least favorites
  - WINNER: Samu (Wild Boar Fillet, Pea Purée in Cherry Plum Sauce)
  - ELIMINATED: Annina (Elk Topside, Puikula Potato Purée, Shallots and Star Anise Jus) and Mika (Elk Fillet, Apple and Wine Sauce, Potato and Celery Dauphines, Garlic Rosemary Purée)
- Guest Judge: Pekka Terävä
- Original Airdate: 23 March 2011

=== Episode 10: Finale (Suomen Top Chef -finaali) ===
- Final Challenge: The finalists must prepare a three course meal for six. Akseli is assisted by former competitor Jussi and Samu is assisted by former competitor Markus. After serving the third course, the finalists are given an extra 15 minutes to prepare a petifour. The final menus for each chef are:

Akseli:
- 1st Course: Seared Scallops with Fennel Risotto and Fennel Sauce
- 2nd Course: Lamb Two Ways, Lentil Ragout, Dark Garlic Sauce and Potato Gnocche
- 3rd Course: Apple Lehikäinen and Oven Baked Apple Ice Cream
- Petifour: Tramisu
Samu:
- 1st Course: Juniper Berry Roasted Arctic Char, Smoked Beetroot Purée and Fish Roe
- 2nd Course: Reindeer Fillet, Buckwheat and Root Vegetable Ragout, Cep Brick and Dark Fig Sauce
- 3rd Course: Caramalised Peanut Cake, Poppy Seen Ice Cream, Mangos and Raspberries
- Petifour: Dark Chocolate Covered White Chocolate and Almond Crocant and Mango

- TOP CHEF: Akseli
- RUNNER-UP: Samu

- Original Airdate: 30 March 2011
