= Social collaboration =

Social collaboration refers to processes that help multiple people or groups interact and share information to achieve common goals. Such processes find their 'natural' environment on the Internet, where collaboration and social dissemination of information are made easier by current innovations and the proliferation of the web.

Sharing concepts on a digital collaboration environment often facilitates a "brainstorming" process, where new ideas may emerge due to the varied contributions of individuals. These individuals may hail from different walks of life, different cultures and different age groups, their diverse thought processes help in adding new dimensions to ideas, dimensions that previously may have been missed. A crucial concept behind social collaboration is that 'ideas are everywhere.' Individuals are able to share their ideas in an unrestricted environment as anyone can get involved and the discussion is not limited to only those who have domain knowledge.

Social collaboration is also known as enterprise social networking, and the products to support it are often branded enterprise social networks (ESNs).

It is important that we understand the rhythm of social collaboration. There needs to be a balance, with ease to move from focused solitary work to brainstorming for problem solving in group work. This critical balance can be achieved by creating structures or a work environment where it is not too rigid to prevent brainstorming in group work nor too loose to result in total chaos. Social collaboration should happen at the edge of chaos.

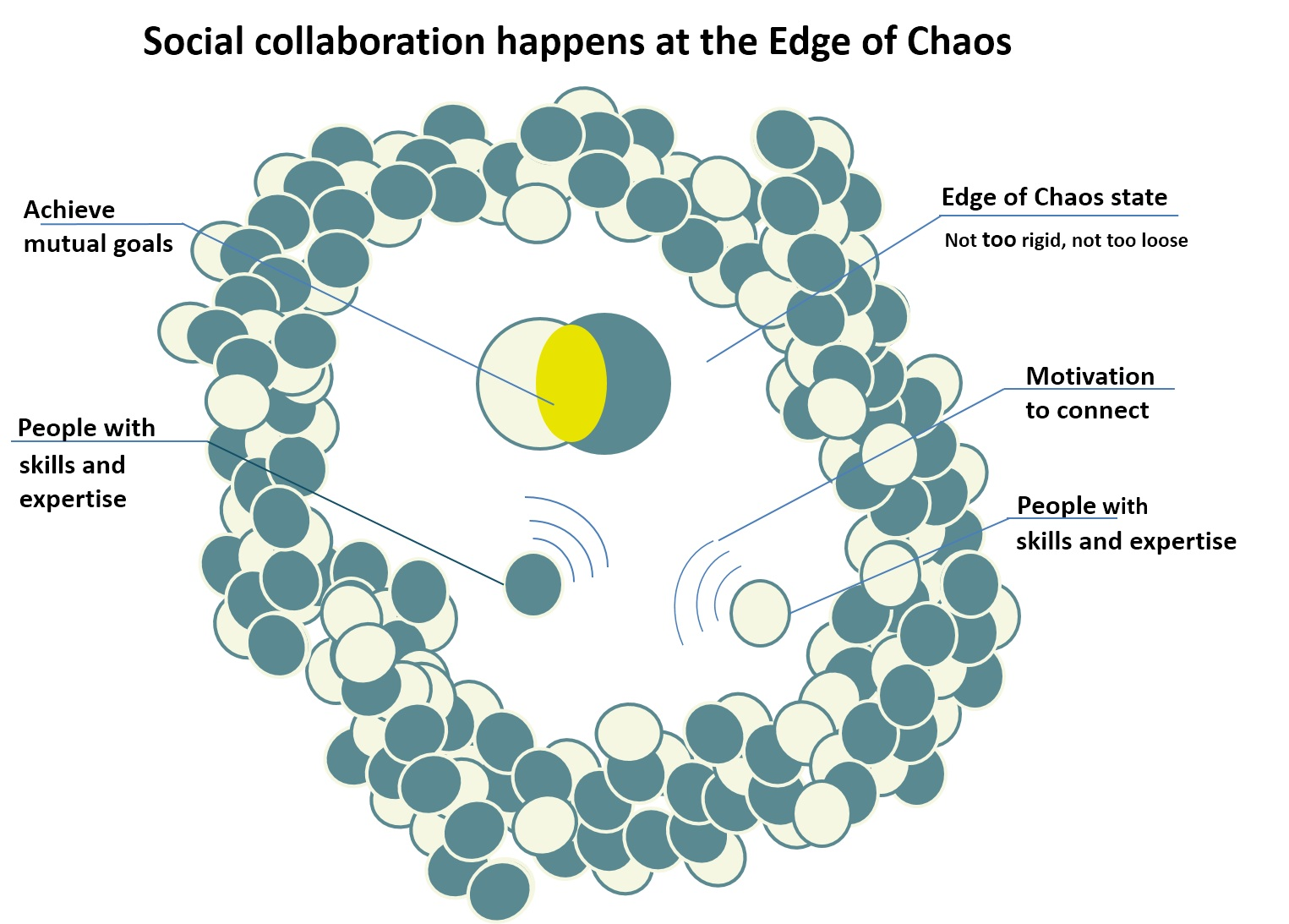
Social collaboration - as many collective creative processes - happens at the edge of chaos. The existing structure and environment should not be too rigid to prevent people from collaborating nor too loose to create chaos. It is essential to strike the right balance.

Work practices should support social collaboration. The most effective environment is one that supports opportunistic planning. Opportunistic planning provides a general plan but then gives enough room for flexibility to change activities and tasks until the last moment. This way, people are able to cope up with unforeseen developments and not throwing away everything with one grand plan.

== Comparison to social networking ==
Social collaboration is related to social networking, with the distinction that while social networking is individual-centric, social collaboration is entirely group-centric. Generally speaking, social networking means socializing for personal, professional or entertainment purposes, for example, LinkedIn and Facebook. Social collaboration, on the other hand, means working socially to achieve a common goal, for example, GitHub and Quora. Social networking services generally focus on individuals sharing messages in a more-or-less undirected way and receiving messages from many sources into a single personalized activity feed. Social collaboration services, on the other hand, focus on the identification of groups and collaboration spaces in which messages are explicitly directed at the group and the group activity feed is seen the same way by everyone.

Social collaboration may refer to time-bound collaborations with an explicit goal to be completed or perpetual collaborations in which the goal is knowledge sharing (e.g. community of practice, online community).

== Comparison to crowdsourcing ==
Social collaboration is similar to crowdsourcing as it involves individuals working together towards a common goal. Crowdsourcing is a method for harnessing specific information from a large, diverse group of people. Unlike social collaboration, which involves much communication and cooperation among a large group of people, crowdsourcing is more like individuals working towards the common goal relatively independently. Therefore, the process of working involves less communication.

Andrea Grover, curator of a crowdsourcing art show, explained that collaboration among individuals is an appealing experience, because participation is "a low investment, with the possibility of a high return."

Advantages of crowdsourcing
Many contributors
Independent tasks
Easy aggregation of the efforts
Diversity of opinions or talents
Avoids problems with interacting crowds

Similarities
Common goal
Reputation boost
Diverse opinions and expertise
Large workers base

Differences
Crowdsourcing	Social collaboration
Information-centric	Production-centric
Narrow focus	Broad focus
Under control	Equal partnership
Community assisted	Inter-group

== Social collaboration software ==
Notable social collaboration software includes Glip messaging, Google Apps, Knowledge Plaza Electronic Document System and Social Intranet, Microsoft Lync social collaboration tool for businesses, Slack, Weekdone for managers, and Wrike.

== Future ==
Social collaboration is going to be used as a tool in companies to enhance productivity. Social workers could be able to use social collaboration tools to manage personal tasks, professional projects and social networks with other colleagues within the same organization.

Social collaboration will serve as a platform to get people involved and connected. This kind of platform provides a spiritual training practice for social workers.

Social collaboration software could help enhance the communication between customers and employees and build trust in the organization.

When we need real-time chat, it would be excellent to include every participant in a shared and archived forum which keeps a record of important information and logs. So collaborators need not worry about losing important records while working towards the common goal.

The interactive communication and synchronous environment promote understanding among colleagues. Collaboration helps in building strong relationships between workers, which in turn leads to faster problem solving. The close connection between workers and customers creates a scalable organization which naturally increases the trust and faith that customers have in the company. Therefore, the interactive customer relationship levels up customer satisfaction in ways that traditional collaboration methods cannot.

Apart from its effect on the way work will be conducted in the future, social collaboration will also affect society. In the coming years social collaboration will be the driving force in societal change as more and more people work together to get their vision across to governments and governing agencies. An example of this is Change.org, an online petition tool where users can help bring their government's attention to pressing social issues that need to be addressed.

== See also ==
- Collaborative software – Type of application software
- Community of Practice
- Crowdsourcing – Sourcing services or funds from a group
- CrowdFlower – American software company
- Crowdfunding – Collection of finance from backers to fund an initiative
- Collaborative filtering – Algorithm used by recommender systems
- Collaborative tagging – Classification based on users' tags
- Collective intelligence – Group intelligence that emerges from collective efforts
- Enterprise 2.0 – Websites that use technology beyond the static pages of the early Internet
- Knowledge Management – Processing of knowledge to accomplish organizational goals
- Online Community – Social network of individuals who interact through specific social media
- Online participation – Extent to which the web encourages the people to share in organizational decision-making
- Social Network – Social structure made up of a set of social actors
- Social networking service – Online platform that facilitates the building of relations
- Social tagging – Classification based on users' tags
- Web 2.0 – Websites that use technology beyond the static pages of the early Internet
