= Use AI =

Artificial intelligence workspace

Use AI is an artificial intelligence workspace that lets users access to several third-party large language models through a single subscription, and in 2026 the company began describing it as a workspace that also combines files, projects and team collaboration. In October 2026, The Next Web reported that Use.ai had reached one million monthly active users less than a year after launch.

Its surveys on everyday uses of artificial intelligence drew press coverage during 2026, including a survey of 9,684 working adults on AI and perceived competence reported by Euronews and a survey on men's comfort discussing personal feelings with AI tools reported by the New York Post. A separate survey covered by WWD (magazine) found that 41% of respondents who regularly used AI when shopping said a conversation with an AI assistant had changed their mind about a planned purchase.

In October, TechRadar reported on a Use.AI survey of 8,316 adults who used AI at work. Of those respondents, 34% said they had passed along AI-assisted work without checking it, and 58% said their workplace had no rules for reviewing such work.
