= Chez Dominique =

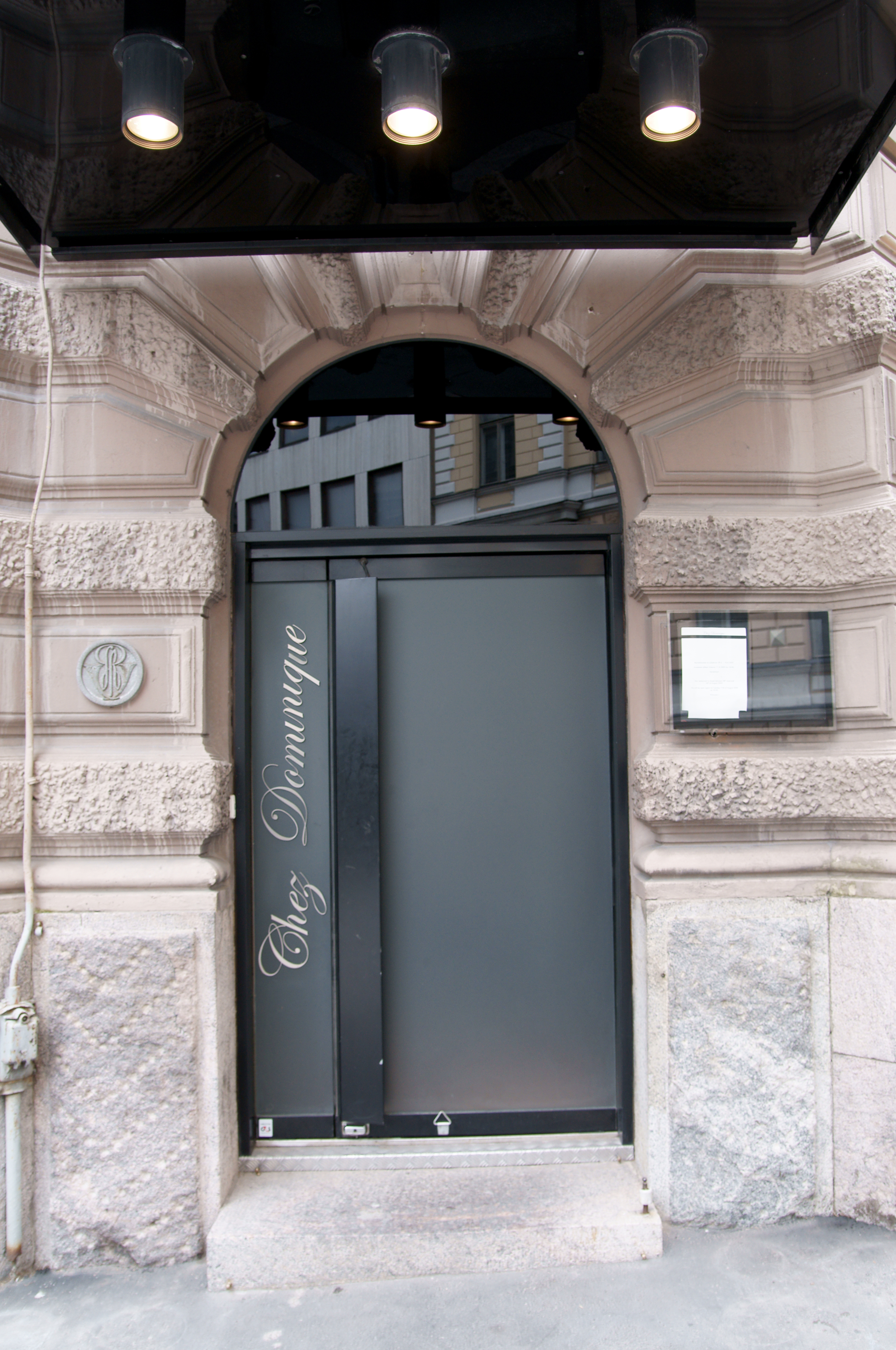
- Interactive map of Chez Dominique

Restaurant information
- Established: 1998; 28 years ago
- Closed: October 5, 2013; 12 years ago
- Owner: Hans Välimäki
- Head chef: Hans Välimäki
- Rating: Michelin Guide
- Location: Rikhardinkatu 4, Helsinki, Finland
- Coordinates: 60°09′57″N 024°56′46″E
- Website: formerly www.chezdominique.fi

Chez Dominique was a restaurant in Helsinki, Finland. The chef and owner was Hans Välimäki. The restaurant was located at Rikhardinkatu 4, and seated 50 people. The restaurant closed in October 2013.

== Cuisine ==
Chez Dominique balanced between classical cuisine and experimental cuisine. The food had French and Finnish influences. The most popular items on the menu were four, six and nine course surprise menus. A nine course surprise menu with wines was approximately 300 euros. The restaurant also served lunch during the day.

== Awards and recognitions ==
The restaurant was voted 21st best in the world in Restaurant (magazine) Top 50 2009. In 2007 Välimäki said of the restaurant's status as one of the world's best restaurants, "I think this achievement proves that food is becoming more and more part of culture, and Finland does not make an exception in this development".

The restaurant was awarded one Michelin star in 2001. Since 2003 it has retained two Michelin stars.

Chez Dominique was selected as the best restaurant in Finland from 2004 to 2006.

== See also ==
- List of French restaurants
