= Hans Välimäki =

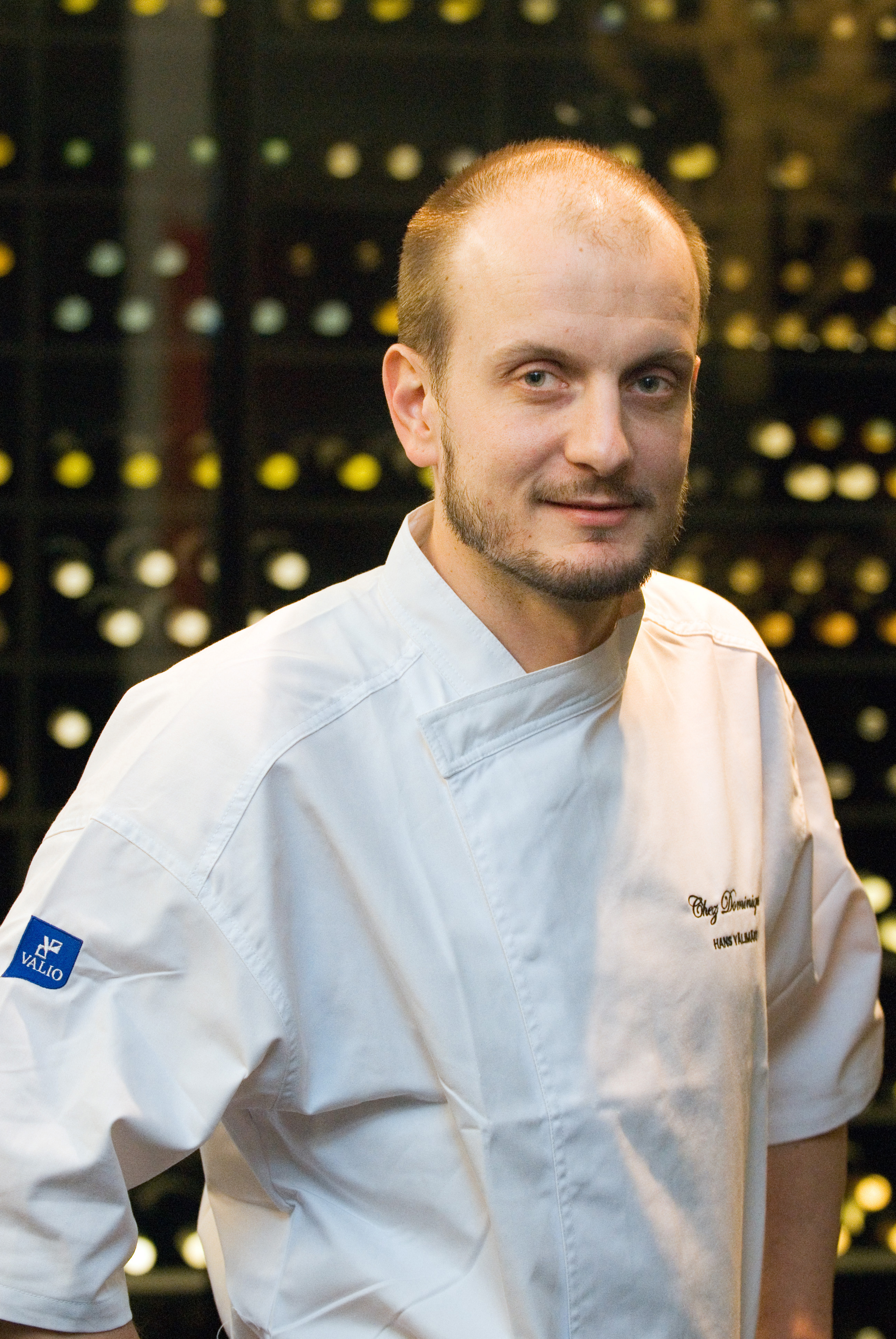
Hans Välimäki.

Hans Välimäki (born 23 April 1970) is a Finnish chef, and since 1998, was the owner of the now closed restaurant Chez Dominique. Välimäki was the chief judge of the Sub culinary show Top Chef Suomi and hosts the Finnish version of Ramsay's Kitchen Nightmares, Kuppilat kuntoon, Hans Välimäki!.

Välimäki is married and has four children.

== Bibliography ==
- Kahden tähden keittokirja, Kaisaniemen Dynamo, 2003
- Koti keittiössä, Otava, 2004 – vuoden 2004 suomalainen keittokirja. (food: Hans Välimäki, pictures: Sami Repo, text: Mikko Takala) reprint 2007
- Chez Dominique, Otava, 2004 (food: Hans Välimäki, pictures: Sami Repo, text: Mikko Takala)
- Grillistä, Otava, 2005 (food: Hans Välimäki; pictures: Sami Repo; text: Mikko Takala.)
- P.S.: parasta sokerista, Otava, 2007 (desserts and pastries: Hans Välimäki, Vesa Parviainen, pictures: Sami Repo, text: Mikko Takala, Anu Hopia.)
- Välimäki, Otava, 2008 (food: Hans Välimäki, pictures: Sami Repo, text: Mikko Takala.
- Lusikka soppaan!, Otava, 2009 (food: Hans Välimäki, pictures: Sami Repo, text: Mikko Takala).
- Mummola, Otava, 2009 (food: Hans Välimäki; pictures: Sami Repo; text: Mikko Takala.)
- Ruokaa Ranskasta Hansin tapaan, WSOY, 2010 (food: Hans Välimäki; pictures: Sami Repo; text: Kenneth Nars.))

== Awards ==
- First Michelin star 2001, second star 2003
- Helsinki Medal
- Restaurateur of The Year 2003, International Food & Beverage Forum
