= Tuomas Vimma =

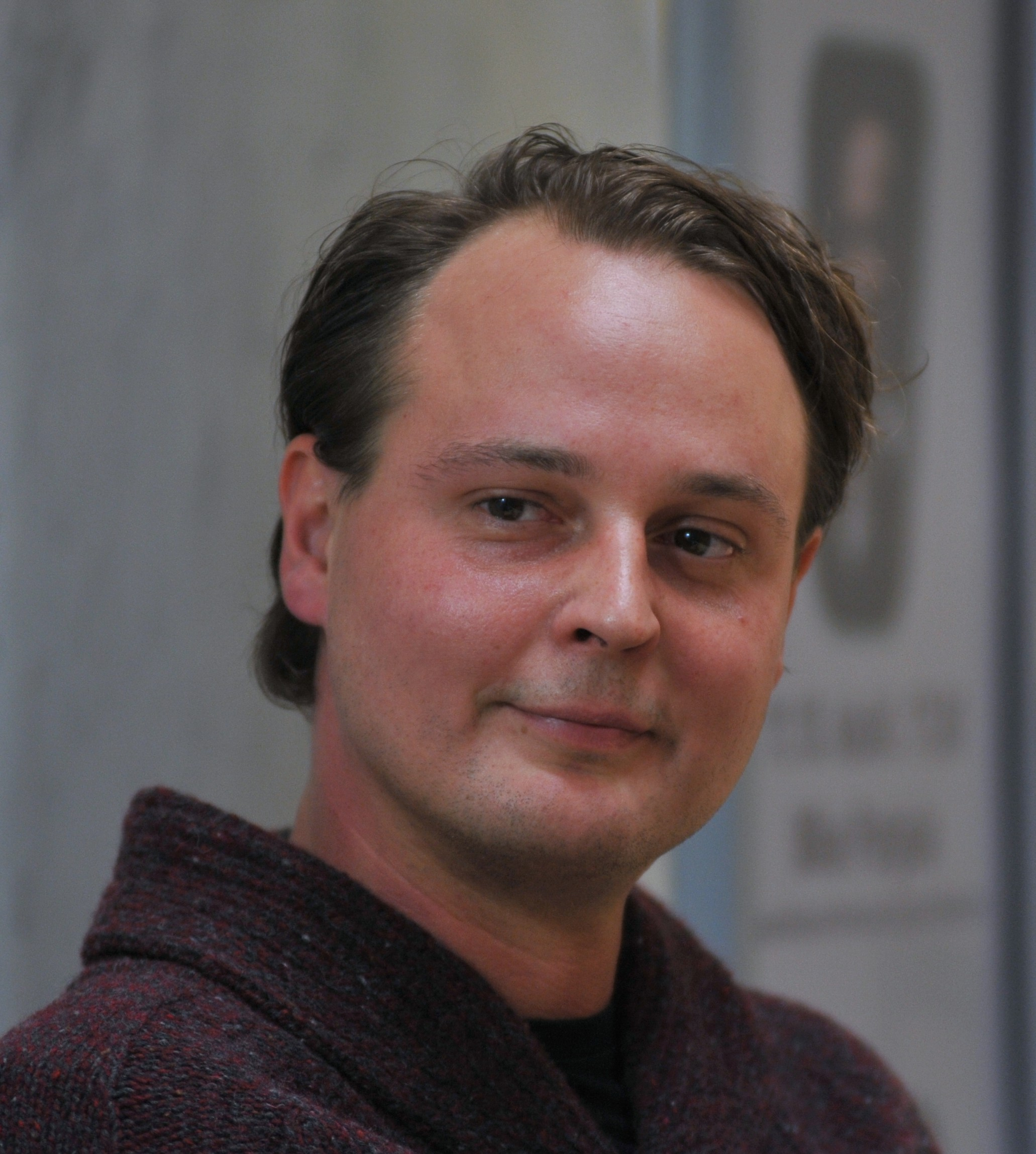
Vimma in Helsinki in 2011.

Kusti Miettinen (born 20 April 1979, Branau am Inn, Austria) better known by his pen name Tuomas Vimma, is a Finnish author, screenwriter, columnist, cook and culinary instructor.

Initially Vimma achieved success as a novelist in the mid-2000s in Finland, with the release of his debut novel Helsinki 12 (2004). The novel described the flashy and high stakes life of a yuppie AD in the late 1990s during the IT boom in Finland, with events taking place in the trendy district of Punavuori. Finnish daily Helsingin Sanomat listed it as the 92nd greatest novel published in Finland since the 2000s.

Since then, Vimma has gone on to write 7 more novels, two nonfiction works, worked as a columnist at City magazine and as a screenwriter for Exit, a Finnish adaptation of a Norwegian series of the same name. Additionally, Vimma works as a cook and culinary teacher.

== Early life and background ==
Vimma was born on the 20th of April 1979 in Branau am Inn, Austria. His father, Hannu I. Miettinen (1945–2014) was a renowned Finnish particle physicist and academic. Vimma also has a brother, who works as an entrepreneur.

After graduating from school, Vimma started work in various advertising firms and agencies in Helsinki. He worked for roughly four years as an AD at various firms before quitting and focusing on writing. Additionally, he studied at the open university of the University of Helsinki.

== Career ==
Vimma's debut novel Helsinki 12 was published in 2004. It was an immediate hit, selling over 15,000 copies and was nominated by Finnish daily Helsingin Sanomat for their debut novel prize. Reviews compared the language, style and prose to the likes of Bret Easton Ellis' work, American Psycho. The novel sparked controversial debate about the advertising industry in Finland. However Vimma defended his writings and admitting that it has a lot of irony and humor. Helsinki 12 has since been regarded as a cornerstone work in postmodern Finnish literature, and was selected by a panel of critics from Helsingin Sanomat as the 92nd greatest novel in Finland since the 2000s.

Following the success of Helsinki 12, Vimma's next two books Toinen (2005) and Gourmet (2008) mostly focused on gastronomy and cooking. After further success, Vimma pivoted to writing novels about the construction industry in Finland and exploitation in the industry.

In 2016 Vimma and his wife Jenni Tuominen published a book on how to run a pop-up restaurant. Vimma's wife is Finland's first Cordon Bleu In 2018, Vimma published a work detailing the history of the Finnish startup industry.

In 2022, he worked as a screenwriter for the Finnish adaptation of Norwegian TV series Exit. He utilized ideas and experiences from his recent book and interviews on the Finnish startup scene.

Today, Vimma works as a cook and culinary teacher together with his wife Jenni Tuominen.

== Personal life ==
Vimma is married to Le Cordon Bleu trained pastry and cuisine chef Jenni Tuominen. Previously Tuominen was the chef de cuisine of the Finnish EU-representation in Brussels. Together they have lived in Paris, Brussels and Helsinki. They have a rescue dog, Natasha.

== Selected works and projects ==
=== Novels ===
- Helsinki 12 (Otava, 2004)
- Toinen (Otava, 2005)
- Gourmet (Gummerus, 2008)
- Raksa (Gummerus, 2011)
- Ruutukymppi (Gummerus, 2013)
- Firman mies (Gummerus, 2014)
- Vasen ranta (Gummerus, 2017)
- Koodinimi Taïga (Gummerus, 2020)

=== Nonfiction ===
- Pop up: Kanslerin keittokirja (Together with his wife Jenni Tuominen) (Kosmos, 2016)
- Enkeleitä ja yksisarvisia: Startup-Suomen historia (Otava, 2018)

=== TV ===
- Screenwriter, Exit (2022) (C-more & MTV Finland)
