= Iobox =

Finnish mobile and web portal operator

Iobox Oy
- The original iobox-logo "we bring the Internet to your mobile"
- Company type: Privately held company
- Website type: web portal
- Founded: January 1999
- Headquarters: London, United Kingdom
- No. of locations: Several, including Helsinki, London, Munich, Stockholm, Oulu
- Area served: Europe
- Founders: Jari Ovaskainen, Henry Nilert
- Industry: Mobile telecommunications
- Products: iobox.* portal, Wapagotchi, "m-Mails"
- Employees: 200+, at peak
- Parent: Telefónica, Terra Networks
- Website: www.iobox.fi

IObox Oy was a Finnish mobile and web portal operator. Formed in 1999, the dot-com company ended up as part of Telefónica Mobile.

At a sale price of $250m (€230m) in 2000, IObox represented the largest venture capital exit in Finland until the sale of MySQL AB in 2008 for $1bn (€670m).

== Growth ==
IObox was founded in January 1999 by Jari Ovaskainen (formerly of Andersen Consulting) and Henry Nilert (formerly of Credit Suisse First Boston). Ovaskainen sold his car and used other assets including his life-savings to raise $120,000. A round of funding in the first month brought in €3.1m and the opening of a Helsinki office in Finland followed.

In November 2000, the office in London, England opened. Second round financing in December 2001 brought another €13m. In January 2000, after offices in Munich and Stockholm had opened, London become the main company headquarters. IObox acquired Futuron Wireless Solutions and with an Oulu office opening in March 2000 had brought the staff count to 70 persons.

At the point of sale in July 2000, the company had grown to 100 employees. This expanded further to beyond 200 employees by near the end of the same year.

== Products ==
IObox operated mobile and web portals, having as many as three million users. In addition the company operated branded portal sites for customers such as the Swedish communications company Telia, using software written in Java EE.

In February 2000 IObox announced Wapagotchi, a digital pet similar to the briefly popular Tamagotchi style toys. The user ("owner") would control their pet using WAP pages. If the virtual pet was neglected, or hadn't been cared for enough, the owner would receive SMS notifications, for example, stating that the pet was "hungry".

For a time from July 2000, IObox offered UK consumers a SMS-to-email gateway costing 6p per email( termed "m-Mail"), despite other companies already having offered such as service for free.

In February 2001, an announcement was made along with provider BEA Systems that their "global wireless portal" had scaled to 3.5 million users and up to 4,000 simultaneous connections. Only a third of the registered users had visited more than once, often only signing up for free credits.

== Ownership ==
The company was originally backed by several venture capitalists, including CapMan Plc (listed on the Helsinki Stock Exchange). CapMan and others disposed all 100% of IOBox to the Spanish organisation Terra Mobile in July 2000 (just 19 months after founding) for €230m cash. Terra Mobile was itself a joint operation of Telefónica and Terra Networks.

Upon the dissolution of IObox Oy prior to December 2002, Telefónica were forced to write-down the "goodwill" associated with the purchase to the tune of €154m

== New Iobox (2008) ==
In early 2007, Finnish company Lapitor Oy acquired a large number of the old iobox.* domain names. The new company announced its intention to try to "carry on from the point where Spaniards left Iobox in 2002". Lapitor stated that it hoped to publish the new Iobox portal venture across twelve European countries.

=== Trademark ===
In January 2008, Lapitor managed to acquire the European-wide trademark for "iobox", saying that they paid nothing for the trademarks. Telefónica had gained the original trademark as part of the €230m buy-out in 2002. As Telefónica has not defended the original, Lapitor has started a process to attempt to cancel Telefónica's trademark.

== Recent developments ==
In the fall of 2011, Suomen Kierrätyskone Oy acquired the Iobox trademark (EU-wide trademark number 005806609) and a large number of associated domain names. A mail service that accepts mail addressed to those domains was brought up in the beginning of February 2012. During the month, it has received approximately 200,000 attempts each day to send email to old iobox addresses. In the end of the year the figure has climbed, with the highest per-day figures seen being close to 4 million. Current owner of the brand is not publicly known.
