= Aaltoes =

Entrepreneurship society in Finland

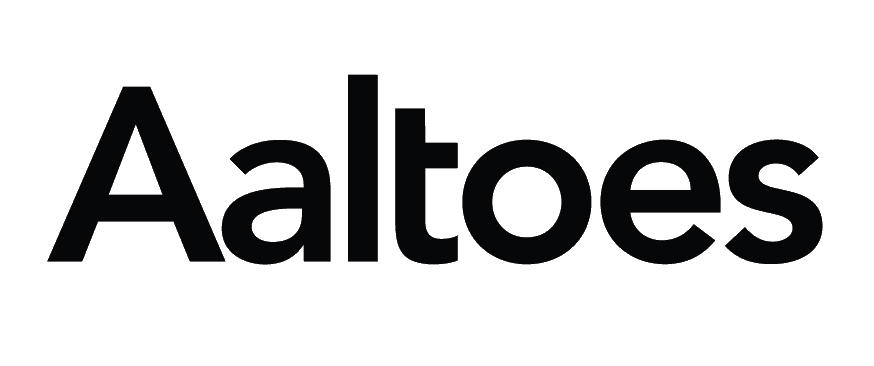
- Formation: 2009
- Type: Non-profit organization run by students
- Official language: English (as per internal communication)
- Website: https://aaltoes.com, https://startupsauna.com, https://slush.org
- Remarks: Aaltoes is the largest community for university entrepreneurship in Europe.

Aaltoes, also known as Aalto Entrepreneurship Society, is a non-profit organization run by students, based in Helsinki, Finland. Founded in 2009, Aaltoes has helped the rapid emergence of a startup culture in Finland in 2008–2011.

Aaltoes's purpose is to inspire international, high-growth entrepreneurship in Finland and especially in Aalto University.

== History ==
Aaltoes was founded in spring 2009 by a group of students from Helsinki University of Technology, Helsinki School of Economics and University of Art and Design Helsinki, who saw that the entrepreneurial climate in Finnish universities did not support students or researchers who wanted to start companies and aim for international markets and high growth.

Prior to the founding of Aaltoes, it was decided that in 2010 Helsinki University of Technology, Helsinki School of Economics and University of Art and Design Helsinki would be merged into a single university, known as Aalto University. The underlying reason behind the merger was similar to that of the founding of Aaltoes. The former University of Technology was split into four schools in 2011 under the authority of Aalto University.

At first, Aaltoes started bringing forth entrepreneurial role models to inspire and encourage students to become entrepreneurs, soon expanding to organizing pitching evenings, hackathons, workshops and other events, where students and researchers could experiment, look for co-founders and learn skills.

In late 2009, as Aalto University was starting to gain its form, Aaltoes made a pitch for a space for young entrepreneurs to work on their companies, ultimately gaining premises and a budget from the university for a 1,500 square metre industry hall on the university's campus in Otaniemi, Espoo. The co-working space would later become known as Aalto Venture Garage.

In 2010, Aaltoes formulated some of its activities into two seed accelerator programs for very early-stage startups, later known as Startup Sauna and Summer of Startups.

Aaltoes was one of the main reasons for Aalto University to become the first official European partner of Stanford University's Technology Ventures Program (STVP) in 2011. In co-operation with Aalto University, Aaltoes tightened the relationship with Stanford University by bringing several high profile people to Finland (for example Steve Blank) and also taking a group of Aalto's faculty members to visit Stanford.

== Emergence in Finnish media ==
Aaltoes became known to the wider audience in Finland through the organizing of Suomi Hyvinvoinnin Jälkeen, which brought together Finnish industrial leaders such as Jorma Ollila, Björn Wahlroos and Risto Siilasmaa to discuss the future prospects of the Finnish economy and the importance of growth in entrepreneurship, bringing together a live audience of over 1,700 people.

The event itself gained wide national recognition, as Nokia's issues in the mobile industry had stirred a lot of discussion on these topics. After the event, Aaltoes was widely featured in the Finnish media, for instance Helsingin Sanomat and Image magazine both wrote lengthy feature stories of the society.

== Aaltoes today ==
Today, Aaltoes maintains a 1,500 square meter co-working space on Aalto University's campus in Otaniemi, called the Startup Sauna and is organizing over 100 events with nearly 10,000 participants (hackathons, pitching, networking, talks, panels and other events related to entrepreneurship) per year. The biggest to name are TeamUp, Summer of Startups, FallUp, Junction, and Slush, one of the world’s largest tech conferences. Aaltoes also gave start to such projects as Startup Life, a year-round, non-profit internship program for the talented people in Finland and Sweden, and Startup Sauna. As of 2018, TeamUp and Summer of Startups have been merged to become Kiuas Accelerator, a combination of a startup accelerator and incubator program.

The organization is funded by the university, public organizations, non-profits, government, and corporations, and operates an annual budget between 500,000 and 800,000 euros.

== See also ==
- Finnish startup scene
- Aalto University
- Slush
- Junction
