= Sonali De Rycker =

Venture capitalist from India

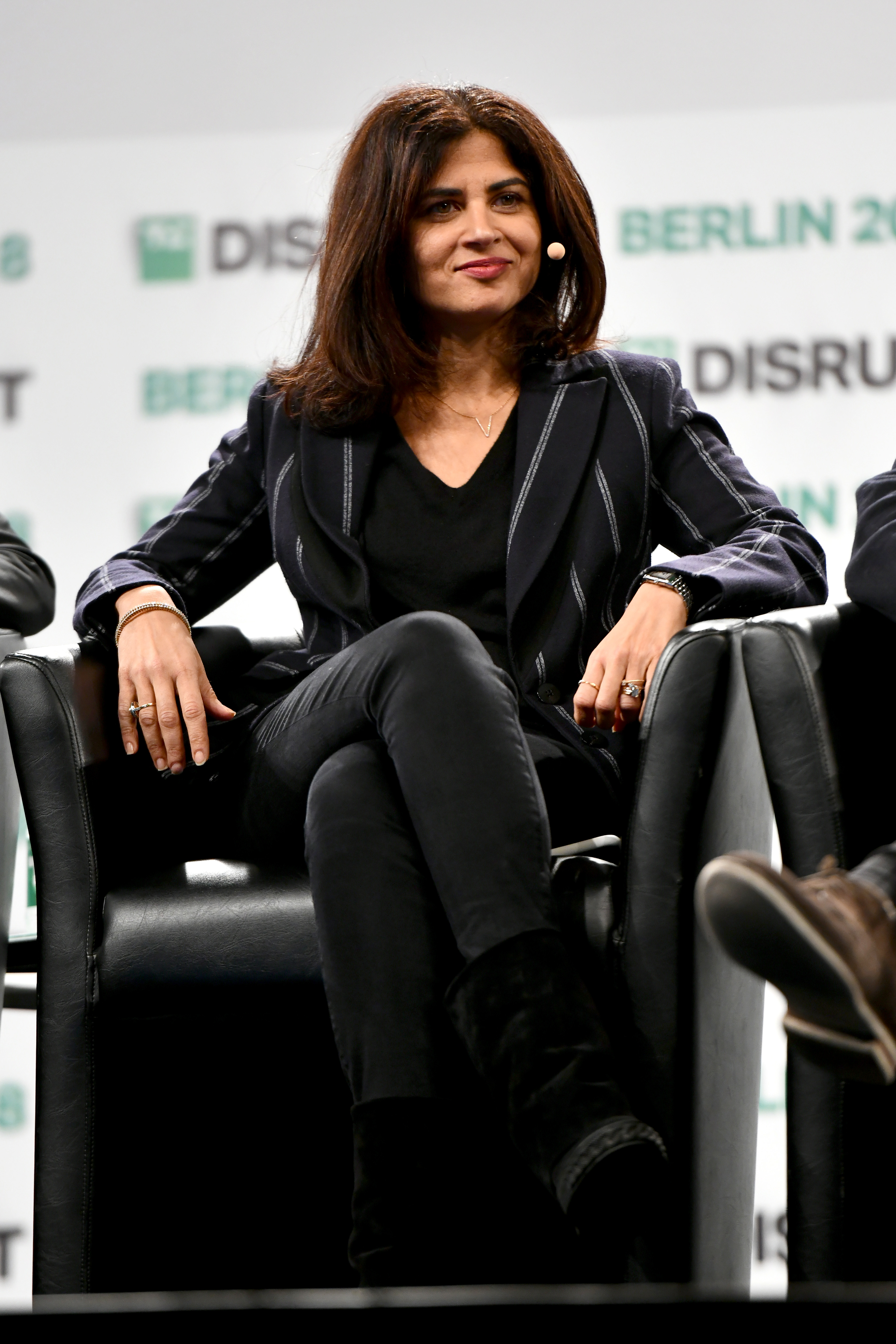
- Sonali De Rycker in 2018
- Born: Mumbai, India
- Education: Bryn Mawr College (Economics), Harvard Business School
- Occupation: Venture Capitalist
- Employer: Accel
- Awards: Forbes Midas List Europe (#2 in 2019)

Sonali De Rycker is a venture capitalist from Mumbai, India.

She studied economics at Bryn Mawr College, graduating in 1995, followed by Harvard Business School. De Rycker started her career at Goldman Sachs and has been a general partner with the venture capital firm Accel in Europe since 2008. She is associated with Accel's investments in Spotify, payday lender Wonga, and Monzo. She was positioned at number 2 in the Forbes Midas List Europe in 2019 and is considered one of the most important women in British technology.
