= Weekdone =

Company based in Estonia

- Type: Privately held company
- Founded: 1 January 2013
- Headquarters: Tartu, Estonia
- Website: Weekdone.com

Weekdone is an internal communication service for teams founded in 2012 that is based in Tartu, Estonia. It enables the OKR goal-setting and progress, plans, problems weekly reporting methodologies.

== History ==
In November 2013 Weekdone won the pitching contest of Slush Helsinki, the largest tech and startup conference in Northern Europe.

The company has raised an investment round of $200,000 (€148,000). The funding was led by Jérémie Berrebi and Xavier Niel's KIMA Ventures, and also included investments by the existing founders, Skype/Kazaa founding engineer and chief architect Ahti Heinla, Rubylight venture fund, and Taavi Lepmets, a former backer of Odnoklassniki, Russia’s largest social network.
