= Finnish startup scene =

Part of Finland's corporate ecosystem

The startup scene in Finland has given birth to companies such as Angry Birds, Supercell, Wolt, and many others.

Entrepreneurship itself in Finland is quite an old phenomenon. However, as everywhere else, the first startups appeared in the early 1990s and some faced demise with the end of dot-com bubble in early 2000.

== The early days ==
Prior to 1995, one of the key influences was the Finnish demo scene which gathered together people interested in burgeoning technology. Many companies such as Hybrid Graphics and Riot-E as well as others have their roots in the demo scene.

== The dot-com bubble ==
The dot-com bubble in the USA lasted between 1995 and 2000. The bubble has had a major impact on the Finnish start-up ecosystem. One of the most well-known dot-com companies, together with Riot-E, was Iobox. IObox Oy was a Finnish mobile and web portal operator. Formed in 1999, the dot-com company became part of Telefónica Mobile. At a sale price of $250m (€230m) in 2000, IObox was the largest venture capital exit in Finland. It was not surpassed until the sale of MySQL AB in 2008 for $1bn (€670m).

MySQL was another start-up that was built in the middle of the dot-com bubble. The company was founded in 1995 and the first version of MySQL was released in 1996.

== Life after dot-com ==
The period starting in 2003 and ending, roughly, around 2006 was a post-dot-com recovery time for the Finnish start-up ecosystem. One of the key players in the ecosystem at the time was Sulake, which was founded in 2001, but had its most important actions take place after registering as Sulake Corporation in 2003.

Aula movement was one of the key events in 2006 gathering people from different backgrounds to talk about social software. This software community was the beginning of companies like Jaiku (later acquired by Google) and Dopplr (later acquired by Nokia).

== After 2007 ==
This period is characterized by the rise of a grassroots student movement initiated by Aaltoes, the emergence of a new wave of start-up entrepreneurs as well as creation of ArcticStartup, a local media 100% dedicated to covering the start-up scene in the Nordic and Baltic region.

Aaltoes, or Aalto Entrepreneurship Society, was founded in 2009 by a disciplinary group of students from the three founding schools of Aalto University. Currently, Aaltoes remains student-run and a non-profit, while maintaining the largest startup community in Finland.

As in Silicon Valley most startups in Finland are IT related. Recently, however, companies developing physical end-products has risen. Notable examples include Jalo Helsinki and Uploud Audio. Former producing fire alarms while the latter producing loudspeakers.

In 2009 Finland was second largest investor in early stage startups in Europe measured in venture capital as a percentage of GDP.

Finnish member of Parliament Lasse Männistö has established a startup group inside the Finnish parliament.

In 2019, Finland accounted for 10 percent of global startup exits, according to TNW. In terms of local connectivity, the 2018 Global Startup Ecosystem report ranks Helsinki's ecosystem as the best in the world.

In 2020, Finnish startups raised a record-high of €951 in growth funding, the largest investor group being venture capital investors, who invested €495 million into Finnish startup during the year.

== Notable companies ==
- Hybrid Graphics (1994)
- Iobox (1999)
- Riot-E (2000)
- Rovio Entertainment (2003)
- Jaiku (2006)
- Supercell (2010)
- Jolla (2011)
- Wolt (2014)
