= TNW (website) =

Technology and business website and conference

- TNW (The Next Web) logo
- Website type: Technology news
- Available in: English
- Headquarters: Amsterdam, Netherlands
- Owner: Tekpon
- Website: thenextweb.com
- Commercial: Yes
- Launched: 10 June 2008; 18 years ago
- Current status: Active

TNW (The Next Web) is a website and annual series of conferences focused on new technology and start-up companies in Europe. As of 2026 TNW is owned by the Romanian SaaS company Tekpon. The Next Web company was established in 2006 by co-founders Boris Veldhuijzen van Zanten and Patrick de Laive in Amsterdam, Netherlands, and a technology news website of the same name was started in 2009. For some years, the site was a recognised tech news sitie, and TNW's reporting was sourced by Wired, Mashable, and the Huffington Post, among others.

On 5 March 2019, the Financial Times purchased a majority stake in TNW. In 2025, TNW announced it would shut down its events and media operations, holding its last conference in June, while its coworking business continues to operate. In December 2025, Tekpon bought the company, saying they would maintain the website and continue events.

According to de Laive, it took one year for thenextweb.com to reach 100,000 monthly visitors, and at June 2016 it was getting 8 million to 10 million monthly visitors.

== Conferences ==
TNW Conference
- Status: Active
- Genre: Technology and Business
- Location: Amsterdam
- Country: Netherlands
- Inaugurated: 2006
- Founders: Boris Veldhuijzen van Zanten, Patrick de Laive
- Attendance: 17,500 (2019)
- Website: thenextweb.com/conference

Speakers at TNW Conferences have included Gary Vaynerchuk, Prince Constantijn of the Netherlands, and Robert Cailliau.

In 2017, The Next Web's Amsterdam conference came under fire for making misleading statements, and having a lack of transparency about paying presenters for speaking appearances, and for having a gender gap in the number of its male and female presenters, and a gender pay gap in their compensation.

In 2020 the event was fully online and for their 2021 event they held a hybrid and smaller event because of COVID-19 restrictions in the Netherlands.

== See also ==
- Consumer Electronics Show
- Web Summit
- Slush (event)
